= Wood-Pawcatuck Watershed Protection Act =

- Long title: To amend the Wild and Scenic Rivers Act to designate a segment of the Beaver, Chipuxet, Queen, Wood, and Pawcatuck Rivers in the States of Connecticut and Rhode Island for study for potential addition to the National Wild and Scenic Rivers System, and for other purposes.
- Announced in: the 113th United States Congress
- Sponsored by: Rep. James R. Langevin (D, RI-2)
- Number of co-sponsors: 2

Codification
- Acts affected: Wild and Scenic Rivers Act
- U.S.C. sections affected: 16 U.S.C. § 1276(a), 16 U.S.C. § 1276(b),
- Agencies affected: United States Congress, United States Department of the Interior,

[H.R. 723 Legislative history]
- Introduced in the House as H.R. 723 by Rep. James Langevin (D-RI) on February 14, 2013; Committee consideration by United States House Committee on Natural Resources, United States House Natural Resources Subcommittee on Public Lands and Environmental Regulation; Passed the House on June 11, 2013 (voice vote)

The Wood-Pawcatuck Watershed Protection Act (H.R. 723) is a bill that was introduced into the United States House of Representatives during the 113th United States Congress. H.R. 723 would require the National Park Service (NPS) to study segments of the Beaver, Chipuxet, Queen, Wood, and Pawcatuck Rivers in Rhode Island and Connecticut for potential additions to the National Wild and Scenic Rivers System. If these rivers are added to the National Wild and Scenic Rivers System, they might receive special protections and even federal funding.

The bill was introduced by Rep. James Langevin (D-RI) on February 14, 2013. When speaking in favor of the bill on the House floor, Rep. Langevin said that the rivers under consideration "outstanding recreational, natural, and historical qualities that make them worthy of designation of Wild and Scenic Rivers."

This is not the first time that this act has been proposed. Rep. James Langevin also introduced a similar bill (H.R. 3388) in the 112th United States Congress. The Wood-Pawcatuck Watershed Association, a non-profit advocacy group, worked with several other groups, including The Nature Conservancy, Save the Bay, the Rhode Island Department of Environmental Management, and the Connecticut Department of Energy and Environmental Protection, in order to promote this bill in each Congress it has been introduced.

== Provisions/Elements of the bill ==
This summary is based largely on the summaries provided by the Congressional Research Service and Congressional Budget Office, both public domain sources.

H.R. 723 would require the National Park Service (NPS) to study segments of the Beaver, Chipuxet, Queen, Wood, and Pawcatuck Rivers in Rhode Island and Connecticut for potential additions to the National Wild and Scenic Rivers System. Based on information provided by the NPS, the Congressional Budget Office has estimated that implementing the legislation would cost about $400,000 over the next three years, assuming the availability of appropriated funds.

The Wood-Pawcatuck Watershed Protection Act would amend the Wild and Scenic Rivers Act to designate for study for potential addition to the national wild and scenic rivers system specified segments of the Beaver, Chipuxet, Queen, Wood, and Pawcatuck Rivers in Rhode Island and Connecticut. If passed, the Act would require the study to: (1) include the effect of designation on existing commercial and recreational activities, energy production and transmission infrastructure, and the authority of state and local governments to manage such activities; and (2) identify authorities allowing the influence of local land use decisions or restrictions on non-federal land, condemnation authorities, and all private property located in the study area.

== Procedural history ==
=== House ===
The Wood-Pawcatuck Watershed Protection Act H.R. 723 was introduced into the House by Rep. James Langevin (D-RI) on February 14, 2013. It was referred to the United States House Committee on Natural Resources and the United States House Natural Resources Subcommittee on Public Lands and Environmental Regulation. On June 11, 2013, the Wood-Pawcatuck Watershed Protection Act passed the House by voice vote. The bill received little or no debate, and was not considered particularly controversial.

=== Senate ===
The Wood-Pawcatuck Watershed Protection Act was received in the United States Senate on June 12, 2013.

== See also ==
- List of bills in the 113th United States Congress
- National Wild and Scenic Rivers System
- Beaver River (Rhode Island)
- Chipuxet River
- Pawcatuck River
- Queen River (Rhode Island)
- Wood River (Pawcatuck River)
