= Charles, Providence, Rhode Island =

Neighborhood in northern Providence, Rhode Island

Coordinates: 41.88°N 71.41°W

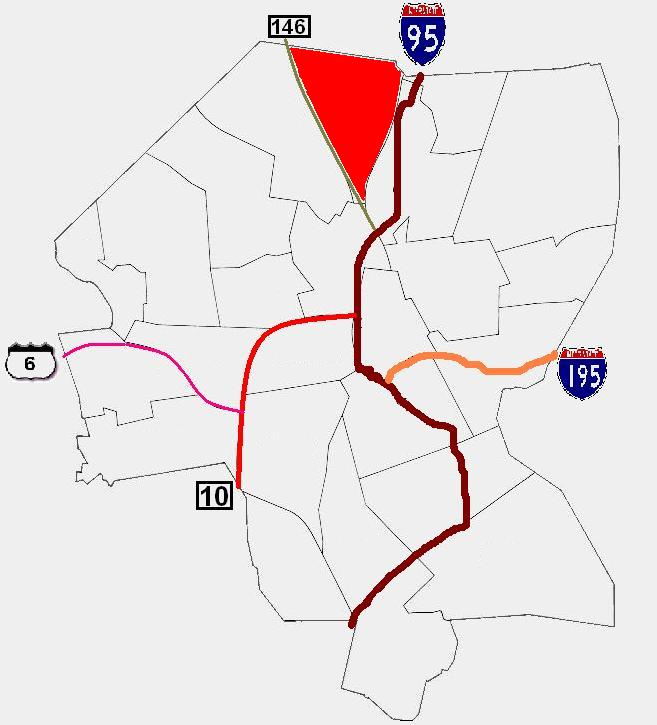
Providence neighborhoods with Charles in red

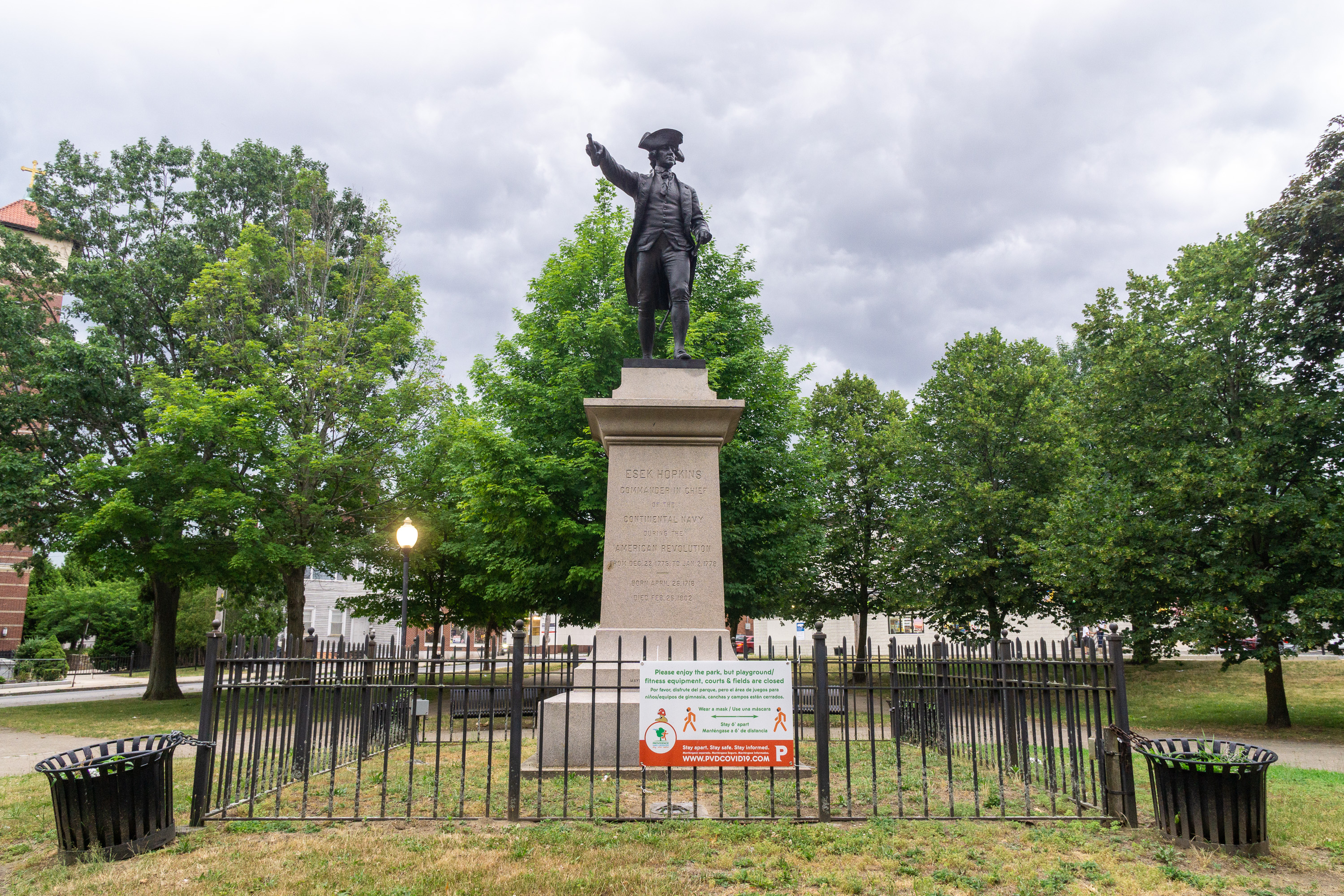
Hopkins Square, at the intersection of Charles Street and Branch Avenue

Charles is a neighborhood in northern Providence, Rhode Island. Along with Wanskuck, it comprises what is sometimes referred to as the North End. To the west Charles is partitioned from Wanskuck by Route 146, while the Chad Brown public housing complex separates Charles from Smith Hill to the south, and the West River and Interstate 95 bounds the area to the east. The city limits abutting the city of North Providence bound Charles to the north.

== History ==
Until Wanskuck Road (now Branch Avenue) was completed in 1706, Charles's lack of connections to the more developed part of Providence kept the area sparsely populated. In 1765, the isolated North End (of which Charles is a part) was annexed to the neighboring town of North Providence. By the 19th century, the improvement in infrastructure and proximity to the West River caused corporations such as the Silver Spring Bleaching and Dyeing Company to move to the area. With the new industry came an influx of immigrants and an increase in demand for housing stock. By the end of the century the neighborhood was filled with one and two family homes of Irish, English, German, Scottish, and Italian immigrant families, with the largest presence found of the latter. This rapid growth and development were among the factors that lead North Providence to return the North End to Providence in 1874.

The neighborhood's connection to the rest of Providence improved further with streetcar service in 1895. By the 1930s, Charles was densely settled by the working and middle class.

In the latter half of the 20th century, much industry declined and withdrew from the region, though the effects have been somewhat mitigated by Providence's attempts to market part of the area as an industrial park.

== Demographics ==
For census purposes, the Census Bureau classifies Charles as part of the Census Tract Area 29. This neighborhood had 7,420 inhabitants based on data from the 2020 United States Census.

The racial makeup of the neighborhood was 31.8% (2,361) White (Non-Hispanic), 8.6% (635) Black (Non-Hispanic), 8.3% (617) Asian, 10.2% (821) from some other race or from two or more races. Hispanic or Latino of any race were 40.2% (2,986) of the population. 23.4% are foreign born, with most foreign born residents originating from Africa (43%) and Latin America (37%).

The median age in this area is 35.9 years old. Family Households made up 77% of the population, and the average household (family and non-family) had 2.7 persons living there. 36% of the population was married. 43% of households (family and non-family) owned their houses, and 57% rented their houses. The average house was worth $293,700, which is slightly lower than the average in Providence.

== Government ==
All of Charles is in Ward 4, which is represented in the Providence City Council by Nicholas J. Narducci, Jr, a Democrat.

== Parks ==
The Charles neighborhood includes four green spaces:

- Ascham Field - a 1.72-acre (7,000 m^{2}) athletic filed.
- Hopkins Square - a 1-acre (4,000 m^{2}) plaza at the corner of Branch Avenue and Charles Street. The square includes a statue of Esek Hopkins.
- Prete-Metcalf Field - an 11.36-acre (46,000 m^{2}) area of athletic fields and walking trails
- St Ann's Plaza - a small plaza at the corner of Branch Avenue and Hawkins Street.

There is also a preserve, the Canada Pond Management area, in the northwest corner of Charles. The preserve extends into North Providence, Rhode Island.
