= Pine River (Rhode Island) =

River in Rhode Island, United States

- Location within Rhode Island

Physical characteristics
- Source
  - coordinates: 41.6144444°N 71.4375°W
- Mouth
  - coordinates: 41.6092679°N 71.4439459°W

The Pine River is a river in the U.S. state of Rhode Island. It flows approximately 8 km (5 mi). There are no dams along the river's length.

== Course ==
The river rises in the swamps near the U.S. Naval Reservation in North Kingstown, near Devil's Foot Road. The river continues due east to its confluence with Narragansett Bay at Quonset Point. The last mile of the river is almost entirely buried under the Naval Reservation at Quonset Point. During this last mile, the river provides water to Davol Pond.

== Crossings ==
Below is a list of all crossings over the Pine River. The list starts at the headwaters and goes downstream.

- North Kingstown
  - Navy Drive
  - Devil's Foot Road (RI 403)
  - Namcook Road
  - Post Road (U.S. 1)
  - Newcomb Road (from here the river goes into a tunnel underneath the Naval Reservation at Quonset Point)

== Tributaries ==
The Pine River has no named tributaries, though there are many unnamed streams that also feed it.

== See also ==
- List of rivers in Rhode Island
- Narragansett Bay
