= Maiford River =

River in Rhode Island, United States

Coordinates: 41.4912°N 71.2591°W

The Maiford River is a river in the U.S. state of Rhode Island. It flows approximately 1 km (0.6 mi). There are no dams along the river's length.

== Course ==
The river rises from an unnamed pond north of Gardiner Pond in Middletown. From there, it flows due south along Hanging Rock Road to the Maidford River.

== Crossings ==
Hanging Rock Road is the only crossing over the Maiford River due to its short length.

== Tributaries ==
The Maiford River has no named or unnamed streams that feed it.

== See also ==
- List of rivers in Rhode Island
