= Annaquatucket River =

River in Rhode Island, United States

Coordinates: 41.573971°N 71.499117°W

The Annaquatucket River is a river in the U.S. state of Rhode Island. It flows approximately 7 km (5 mi) and drains a watershed of 18.9 km^{2} (7.3 sq. mi). There are two dams along the river's length.

== Course ==
The Annaquatucket rises on the north side of Pork Hill in North Kingstown, near Hatchery Road. The river flows north to Rhode Island State Route 4, then turns south and flows into Belleville Pond. South of the pond, the river continues in a southeasterly direction to its mouth at Narragansett Bay.

== Crossings ==
Below is a list of all crossings over the Annaquatucket River. The list starts at the headwaters and goes downstream.

- North Kingstown
  - Rhode Island State Route 4
  - Lafayette Road
  - U.S. Route 1
  - Featherbed Lane
  - Rhode Island State Route 1A

== See also ==
- List of rivers in Rhode Island
