= Queen River =

Queen River or Queen of the River or River Queen or variant, may refer to:

== Queen River ==
- Queen River, Tasmania; a tributary of the King River in Australia
- Queen River (Rhode Island); a river in the United States of America
- Quinn River (Nevada, USA); a river formerly known as "Queen River"

== River Queen ==
- Paddle steamer nickname
- River Queen (steamboat); a U.S. steamboat
- River Queen (2005 film) a New Zealand war film
- Riverqueen; a French thoroughbred racehorse
