= Ashaway River =

River in Rhode Island and Connecticut, United States

Coordinates: 41.430338°N 71.788592°W

National Wild and Scenic River
- Designated: March 12, 2019

The Ashaway River is a river in the U.S. states of Rhode Island and Connecticut. It flows approximately 4 km (2 mi). There are three dams along the river's length.

== Course ==
The river is formed in Hopkinton by the confluence of Parmenter Brook and the Green Fall River, about 500 feet north of Interstate 95, and just a few feet east of the Connecticut state line. From there, it flows south-southwest, briefly entering North Stonington, Connecticut for about 500 feet, before turning southeast and crossing back into Rhode Island and continuing through Hopkinton to its mouth at the Pawcatuck River.

== Crossings ==
Below is a list of all crossings over the Ashaway River. The list starts at the headwaters and goes downstream.

- Hopkinton
  - Interstate 95
  - Wellstown Road
  - High Street (RI 216)
  - Laurel Street

== Tributaries ==
The Ashaway River has no named tributaries, though it has many unnamed streams that feed it.

== See also ==
- List of rivers in Rhode Island
