= Chepachet River =

River in Rhode Island, United States

Coordinates: 41.924911°N 71.656373°W

The Chepachet River is a river in the U.S. state of Rhode Island. It flows 5.2 miles (8.4 km). There are eight dams along the river's length.

== Course ==
The river rises from Cherry Valley Pond in Glocester. From there it flows to Keech Pond and Smith & Sayles Reservoir, then north to Burrillville where it converges with the Clear River to form the Branch River.

== Crossings ==
Below is a list of all crossings over the Chepachet River. The list starts at the headwaters and goes downstream.

- Glocester
  - Chopmist Hill Road (RI 102)
  - Lake View Drive
  - Chestnut Hill Road
  - Putnam Pike (RI 102/U.S. 44)
- Burrillville
  - Gazza Road
  - Mapleville Main Street

== Tributaries ==
In addition to many unnamed tributaries, the following brooks also feed the Chepachet:

- Peckham Brook
- Saunders Brook
- Stingo Brook
- Sucker Brook

== See also ==
- List of rivers of Rhode Island
