= Green Fall River =

River in Connecticut and Rhode Island, United States

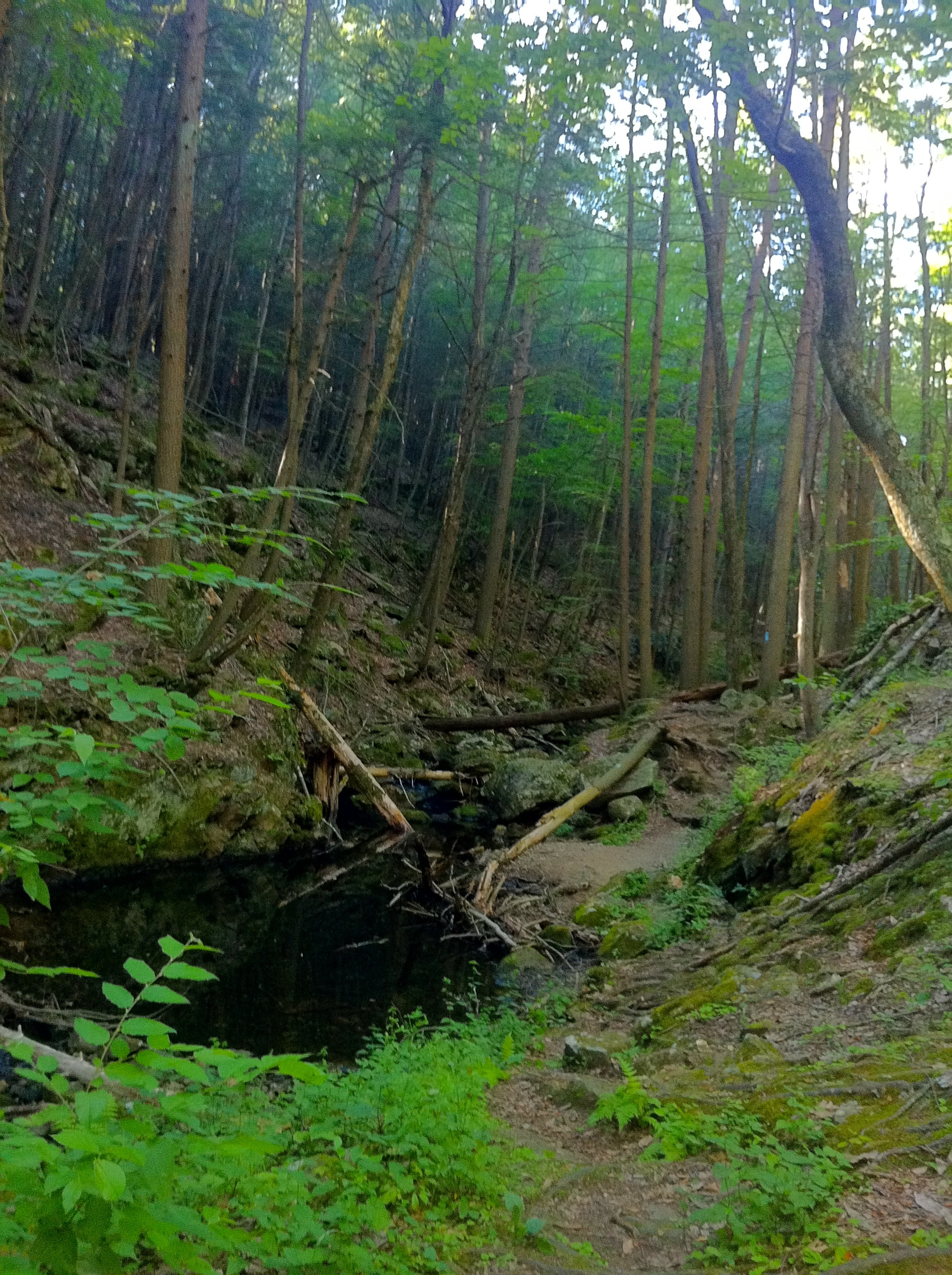
- Green Fall River ravine south of Green Fall Pond dam

National Wild and Scenic River
- Designated: March 12, 2019

The Green Fall River is a river in the U.S. states of Connecticut and Rhode Island. It flows approximately 13 km (8 mi).

== Course ==
The river rises from a swamp south of Rockville Road (Route 138) in Voluntown. The river then flows due south to Green Fall Pond (41.531°N 71.809°W), then continues south through North Stonington and into Hopkinton, Rhode Island where the river converges with Parmenter Brook to form the Ashaway River.

== Crossings ==
Below is a list of all crossings over the Green Fall River. The list starts at the headwaters and goes downstream.

- Voluntown
  - Sand Hill Road/Green Fall Road just south of the Green Falls Pond Dam near the Rhode Island border.
- North Stonington
  - Putker Road
  - Clarks Falls Road (Route 216) (Twice)

== Tributaries ==
In addition to many unnamed tributaries, the following brooks also feed the Green Fall:

- Peg Mill Brook
- Palmer Pond Brook
- Glade Brook

== See also ==
- List of rivers in Connecticut
- List of rivers in Rhode Island
