= List of rivers of Rhode Island =

This is a list of rivers in the U.S. state of Rhode Island. Rivers in bold are considered major rivers either geographically or historically.

Most waterways in Rhode Island drain into the Blackstone River, the Pawtuxet River, or the Pawcatuck River. Rhode Island has more than 1,300 miles of river.

== By stream network ==
All rivers eventually empty into the Atlantic Ocean. Rivers are listed in order from west to east along the coastline, with tributary rivers listed from downstream to upstream along main stem rivers.

=== West of Narragansett Bay ===
- Thames River (Connecticut)
  - Quinebaug River (Connecticut)
    - **Five Mile River**
      - Leeson Brook
    - **Moosup River**
      - Quaduck Brook
- **Pawcatuck River**
  - Ashaway River
    - Green Fall River
  - **Wood River**
    - Flat River
  - Beaver River
  - Usquepaug River
    - Queen River
  - **Chipuxet River**

=== Narragansett Bay ===
- Saugatucket River
- Pettaquamscutt River
  - Mattatuxet River
- Annaquatucket River
- Pine River
- **Potowomut River**
  - Hunt River
- Maskerchugg River
- **Providence River**
  - **Pawtuxet River**
    - Pocasset River
    - **North Branch Pawtuxet River**
      - Moswansicut River
      - Ponaganset River
    - **South Branch Pawtuxet River**
      - Mishnock River
      - Big River
        - Carr River
        - Congdon River
        - Nooseneck River
      - Flat River
  - **Woonasquatucket River**
    - Stillwater River
  - **Moshassuck River**
    - West River
  - **Seekonk River**
    - **Ten Mile River**
      - Sevenmile River
      - Wilde River
    - **Blackstone River**
      - Abbott Run
        - Millers River
      - Peters River
      - Mill River
      - Branch River
        - Chepachet River
        - Clear River
          - Nipmuc River
            - Chockalog River
          - Pascoag River
- **Warren River**
  - **Barrington River**
    - Runnins River
  - Palmer River

=== East of Narragansett Bay ===
- Kickemuit River
- **Sakonnet River**
  - Maidford River
    - Maiford River
  - Quaket River
    - Sin and Flesh Brook

== Alphabetically ==
- Abbott Run
- Annaquatucket River
- Ashaway River
- **Barrington River**
- Beaver River
- Big River
- **Blackstone River**
- Branch River
- Carr River
- Chepachet River
- **Chipuxet River**
- Chockalog River
- Clear River
- Congdon River
- Flat River (Kent County, Rhode Island)
- Flat River (Washington County, Rhode Island)
- Green Fall River
- Hunt River
- Kickemuit River
- Maidford River
- Maiford River
- Maskerchugg River
- Mattatuxet River
- Mill River
- Millers River
- Mishnock River
- **Moosup River**
- **Moshassuck River**
- Moswansicut River
- Nipmuc River
- Nooseneck River
- **North Branch Pawtuxet River**
- Palmer River
- Pascoag River
- **Pawcatuck River**
- **Pawtuxet River**
- Peters River
- Pettaquamscutt River
- Pine River
- Pocasset River
- Ponaganset River
- **Potowomut River**
- **Providence River**
- Quaket River
- Queen's River
- Runnins River
- **Sakonnet River**
- Saugatucket River
- **Seekonk River**
- Sevenmile River
- **South Branch Pawtuxet River**
- Stillwater River
- **Ten Mile River**
- Usquepaug River
- **Warren River**
- West River
- Wilde River
- **Wood River**
- **Woonasquatucket River**

== See also ==
- List of rivers in the United States
