= Big River (Rhode Island) =

River in Rhode Island, United States

Coordinates: 41.637270°N 71.615925°W

The Big River is a river in the U.S. state of Rhode Island. It flows 6.8 miles (10.9 km). There are no dams along the river's length.

== Course ==
The river is formed in West Greenwich by the confluence of the Congdon and Nooseneck rivers. From there, it flows due north through West Greenwich and Coventry to its confluence with the Flat River, in the area now flooded by the Flat River Reservoir, to form the South Branch Pawtuxet River.

== Crossings ==
Below is a list of all crossings over the Big River. The list starts at the headwaters and goes downstream.

- West Greenwich
  - Nooseneck Hill Road (RI 3)
  - Interstate 95
- Coventry
  - Harkney Hill Road (RI 118)
  - Hill Farm Road

== Tributaries ==
The Carr River is the Big River's only named tributary, though it has many unnamed streams that also feed it.

== See also ==
- List of rivers in Rhode Island
