= Warren River =

River in Rhode Island, United States

Coordinates: 41.7043°N 71.2968°W

The Warren River, historically called the Sowams River, is a tidal extension of the Palmer River in the U.S. state of Rhode Island. It flows approximately 6.5 km (4 mi). There are no dams along the river's length.

== Course ==
The river begins where the Palmer River widens just over the border from Swansea. From there it flows due south between the towns of Barrington and Warren to its confluence with the Narragansett Bay.

== Tributaries ==
Barrington River

== See also ==
- List of rivers in Rhode Island
- Barrington River
- Palmer River
- Providence River
- Narragansett Bay

== Sources ==
- Baker, Virginia (1904). Massasoit's Town, Sowams in Pokanoket: Its History, Legends, and Traditions. Warren, RI.
- Maps from the United States Geological Survey
