= Potowomut River =

River in Rhode Island, United States

Coordinates: 41.6550°N 71.4087°W

The Potowomut River (pot-uh-WAHM-ut) is a tidal extension of the Hunt River in the U.S. state of Rhode Island. It runs approximately 2.5 miles (4.0 km).

== Course ==
The river begins in name just south of Old Forge Road in Warwick where the river becomes the southern boundary of Potowomut Neck, an exclave of Warwick. It flows roughly northeast between Warwick and North Kingstown until its mouth at Narragansett Bay.

== Crossings ==
Old Forge Road in Warwick is the only crossing over the Potowomut River.

== Tributaries ==
The Potowomut River has no named or unnamed tributaries.

== See also ==
- List of rivers in Rhode Island
- Hunt River
- Narragansett Bay
