= Branch River (Rhode Island) =

River in Rhode Island, United States

Coordinates: 41.965722°N 71.634884°W

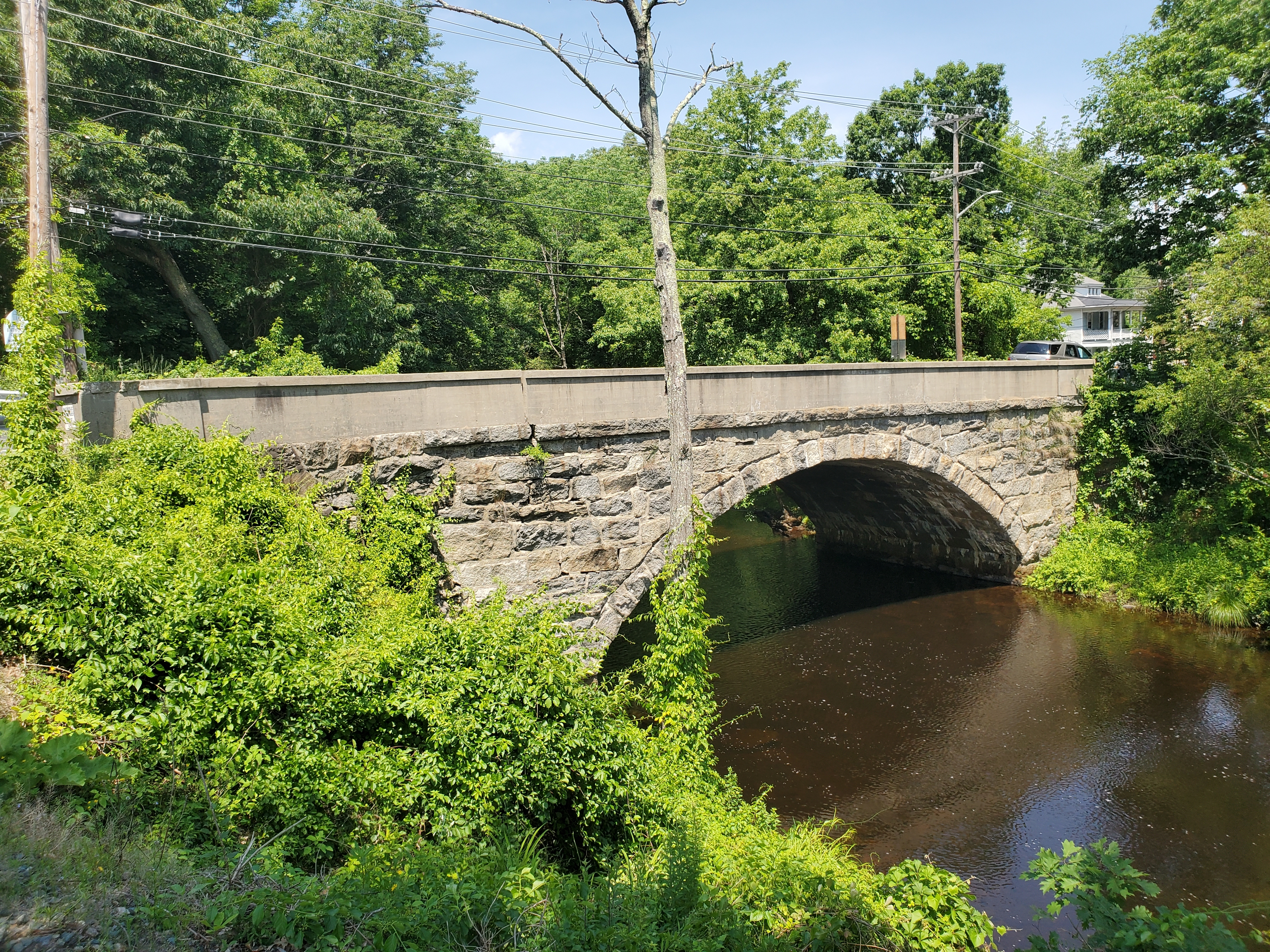
Stone arch bridge that carries Route 7 over the river in Nasonville

The Branch River is a river in the U.S. state of Rhode Island. It flows for approximately 16 km (10 mi). There are six dams along the river's length, including those forming the Slatersville Reservoir. The river provided energy for many of the region's textile mills in the nineteenth century.

== Course ==
The river is formed in Burrillville by the confluence of the Clear and Chepachet rivers. From there, it flows north to North Smithfield, past Slatersville and Forestdale to the Blackstone River.

== Crossings ==
Below is a list of all crossings over the Branch River. The list starts at the headwaters and goes downstream.

- Burrillville
  - Victory Highway
  - Broncos Highway (RI 102) (Twice)
  - Douglas Pike (RI 7)
- North Smithfield
  - Main Street
  - Railroad Street
  - Rhode Island State Route 146
  - Great Road (RI 146A)

== Tributaries ==
Trout and Dawley Brooks are the Branch River's only named tributaries, though it has many unnamed streams that also feed it.

== See also ==
- List of rivers in Rhode Island
