= Kickemuit River =

River in Massachusetts and Rhode Island, US

Kickemuit River Kickamuit River
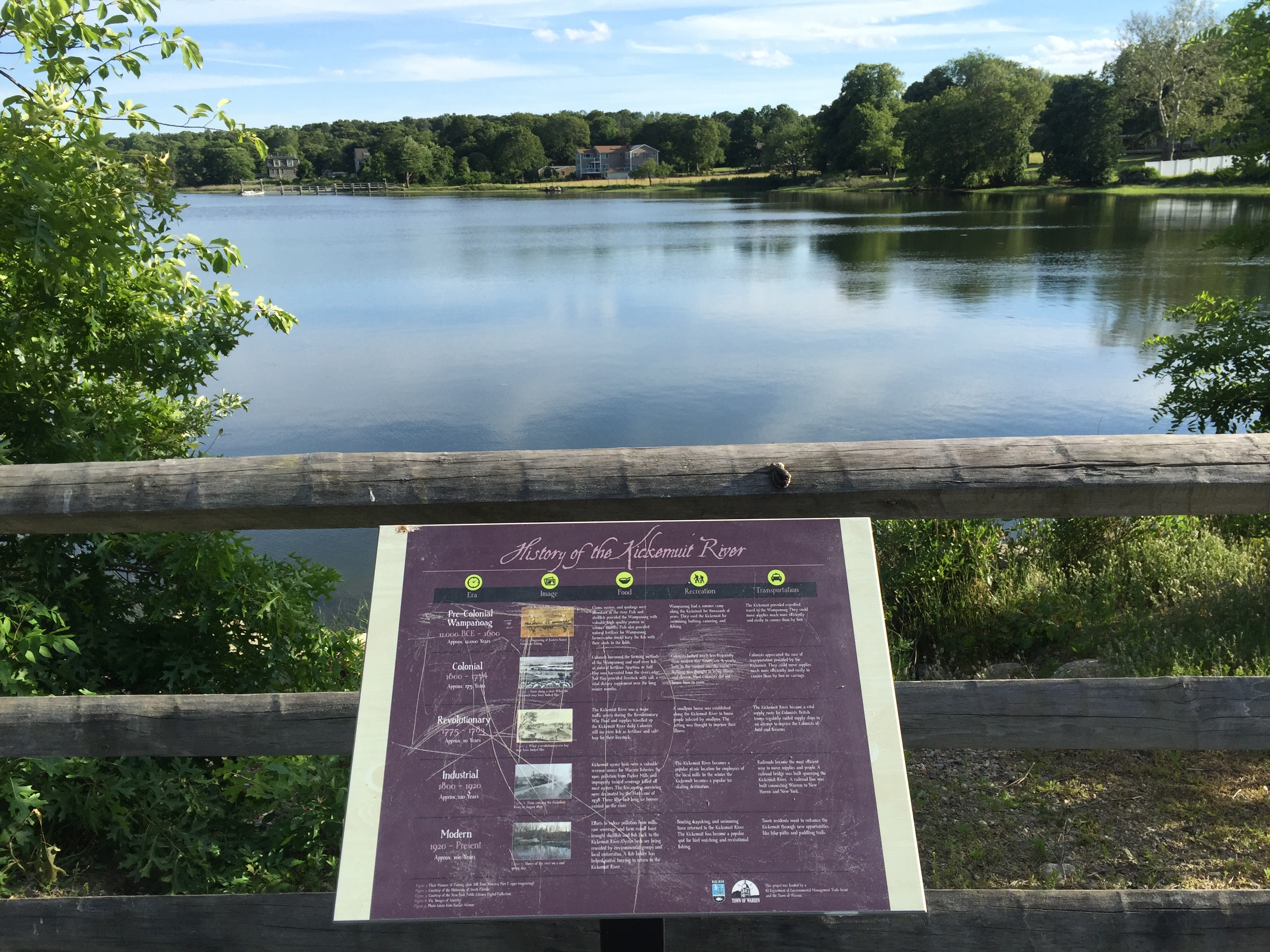
- An informational display telling the history of the Kickemuit River.
- Etymology: Wampanoag
- Nickname: Kickie

Location
- Country: United States
- Cities: Warren, Rhode Island; Rehoboth, Massachusetts
- Towns: Bristol, Rhode Island

Physical characteristics
- Mouth
  - location: Bristol Narrows
  - coordinates: 41°41'53.3682"°N, 71°14'39.1698"°W
- Length: 7.9 miles (12.7 km)
- Basin size: 2,300 acres (930 ha)
- Width
  - maximum: 0.6 miles (0.97 km)
- Depth
  - maximum: 16 feet (4.9 m)
- Discharge
  - location: Mt. Hope Bay

Basin features
- Bridges: Kickemuit Bridge

The Kickemuit River (sometimes written Kickamuit; kick-eh-MEW-it) is a river in the states of Massachusetts and Rhode Island flowing approximately 7.9 miles (12.7 km).

== History ==
The name Kickemuit is a Wampanoag Native American word thought to mean "at the large spring." It has other spellings, an example of which (Kickamuit) is in the map provided below; a third is Kicumuet, as used by the British Army on the map by artilleryman cartographer Lt Edward Fage, Royal Artillery, for the Revolutionary War.

=== Pre-colonial era — the primordial river ===
Being worked on

The Wampanoag Confederation's tradition is that they have occupied the southern New England coasts for 10,000 years. The Pokanoket nation, a member tribe of the Wampanoag Confederation, spent its early ages near the Kickemuit River in the same-named settlement of Pokanoket, in the vicinity of Montaup, current day Mt. Hope, RI. Seals, eels, turtles, and shellfish contributed significant protein to the diets of the Pokanoket people. Various fish species caught using weirs, lines, and nets, supplemented the tribe's daily fare. These fish, suitable as fertilizer, enriched croplands cultivated primarily by Pokanoket women; women who would undertake the demanding task of lobster hunting as well.

Naturalist William Wood noted that "they must dive sometimes over head and eares for a Lobster, which often shakes them by their hands with a churlish nippe, and bids them adiew." During the annual spring fish migrations, Pokanoket communities gathered at established locations such as Nemasket to harvest the fish runs. In harsh New England weather, when Narragansett Bay froze and the Kickemuit was covered with snow, tribal hunters pursued upland animals. With the arrival of spring and the melting of snow, fields were replenished for the cultivation of corn, beans, and squash. Additionally, reeds and cattails were harvested from swamps and marshes and woven into durable, weather-resistant coverings for their wetuash dwellings.

Chase Cove, on the eastern bank of the River's exit at Bristol Narrows and part of the Touisset Marsh Wildlife Refuge, was the summer camp of the Massasoit Ousamequin.

=== Seventeenth century — rise and fall of the Pokanoket ===
The Pokanoket people began trading with the Plymouth Colony when a post was established on the western bank of the Kickemuit in 1632. In 1653, while the colonists bought land along the Kickemuit from the Pokanoket, the relationship between the Pokanoket tribe and the English settlers became unsettled. Massasoit passed leadership of the Pokanoket tribe to his eldest son Wamsutta. Upon Wamsutta's death, Massasoit’s second son Metacom inherited the role of sachem of the Pokanoket in 1662. He became anti-colonial and "opposed the imposition of the ever-expanding English colonies, the spread of illnesses brought by settlers, constant threats, legal disputes and the exploitation of natural resources." Yet Metacom took the name Philip because of the friendly relations between his father and the colony.

In 1675, a war now known as "King Philip's War" began on the banks of the Kickemuit River. It was an armed conflict between Philip's Wampanoag and their allies against the English with their own native allies the that lasted until 1678. This war diminished in southern New England with the fatal shooting of Philip near the western banks of the Kickemuit on August 12, 1676, not far from where it started. King Philip's War lasted until the signing of the Treaty of Casco on April 12, 1678.

The war was the greatest calamity in seventeenth-century New England and is considered by many to be the deadliest war in Colonial American history. In the space of little more than a year, twelve of the region's towns were destroyed and many more were damaged, the economies of the Plymouth and Rhode Island Colonies were ruined and their population was decimated, losing one-tenth of all men available for military service. Hundreds of Wampanoags and their allies were publicly executed or enslaved, and the Wampanoags were left effectively landless. At the same time, more than half of New England's towns were involved in the conflict. The Colony of Rhode Island was devastated by the war, with its principal city of Providence destroyed. It would not be until 1700 that English colonists would again occupy their pre-war borders.

King Philip's War was the last-ditch effort by Native tribes to expel the colonists from New England. Instead, it turned out to be the beginning of the development of an independent American identity. The New England colonists faced their enemies without support from any European government or military, and this began to give them a group identity separate and distinct from England. With the ending of King Philip’s War in 1677 for Rhode Island, nearby colonials once again returned to the river. Colonial governance outlawed use of the word Pokanoket; adolescent tribal boys were executed if they spoke the tribe's name. The remaining Pokanoket people "were forced off their lands — sold into slavery, deported to the West Indies, or scattered among other tribes."

Rhode Island’s Route 136, running parallel to the river, is Bristol, Rhode Island's Metacom Avenue.

=== Eighteenth century — a river in revolution ===
The river was a major traffic artery during the American Revolutionary War, and supplies traveled upriver daily. The row galley Washington was tasked to protect the river at its entry point, the Bristol Narrows. In 1777, an explosion on the galley killed eight crew members. Their bodies were buried on the western bank of the river near the selfsame narrows.

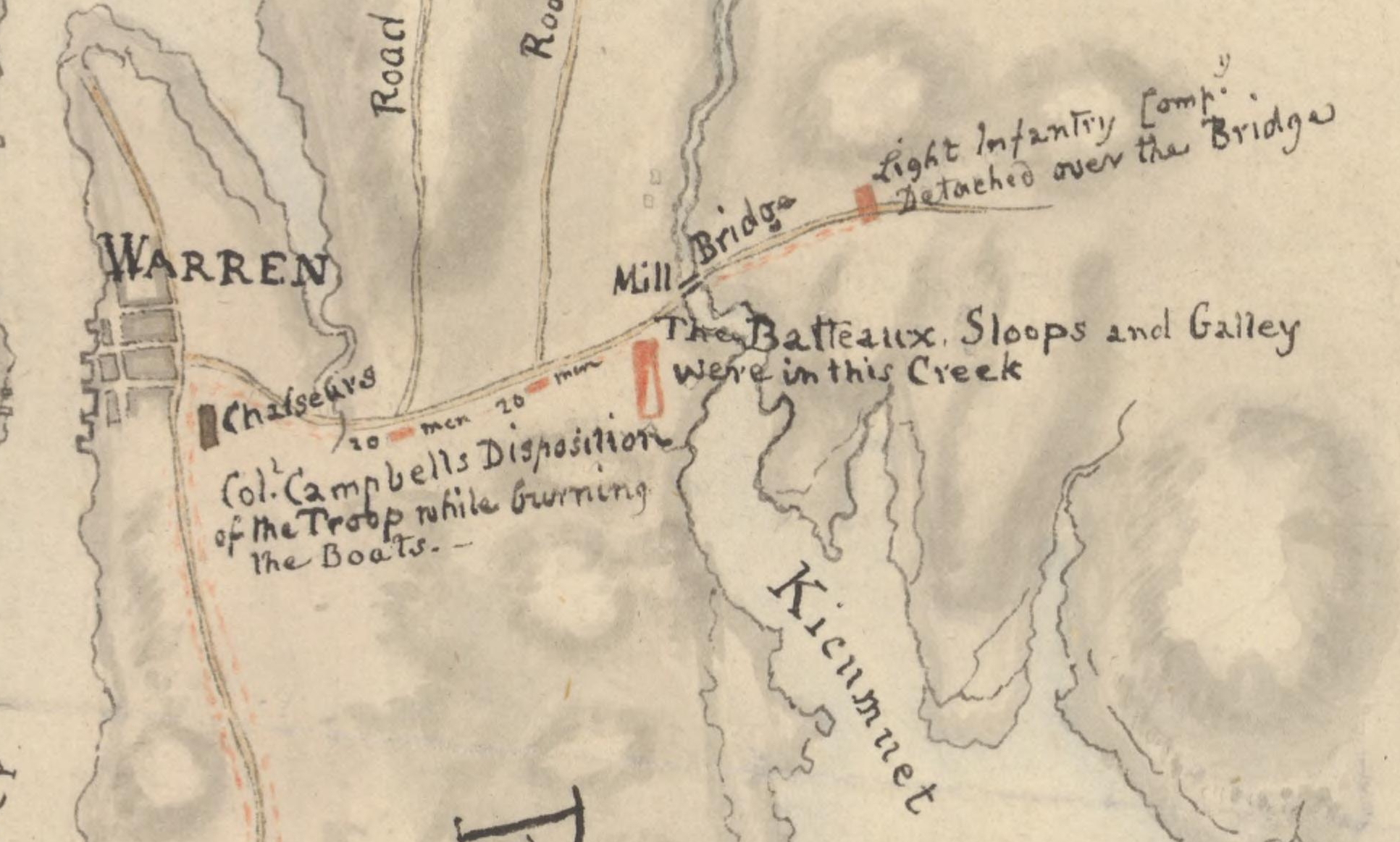
Details of the 25 May 1778 British amphibious operation to Warren, RI and the Kicumuit [sic] River are shown on the map with symbols of military units, figures of naval vessels, and notations.

Bristol Neck was the name given to the peninsula holding the town of Bristol. It is bounded to the east by the Kickemuit and Mount Hope Bay and to the west by Bristol Bay. On May 25, 1778 the British Army, occupying Newport and Aquidneck Island since December 1776, raided Bristol Neck. Among many other chores, the raid assaulted the river from the Mill (now Kickemuit) Bridge that linked Bristol Neck to eastern mills and factories. The British found approximately 100 forty-men flatboats but no guards. They burned all these boats, plus "a Rhode Island state row-galley mounting twelve cannon; two sloops; a store house; equipment used for repairing the boats; a corn mill; seven houses; and the Kickemuit Bridge." The British returned to Newport later that day.

=== Nineteenth century — rise of the Kickemuit oyster ===
On March 6, 1639, the eligible voting citizens of the Colony of Rhode Island and Providence Plantations affirmed that "all the sea banks [are] free for fishing." This initiated a centuries-long economic struggle over the value of an oyster. Oyster shells (calcium carbonate) are a source for the production of masonry lime where limestone mining is infeasible. Oyster detritus byproducts were very much needed to grow a new colony.

Absent anything else, King Charles II’s Royal Charter of 1663 provided state governance until 1843. Unfortunately, not without controversy.

Our Express Will and Pleasure is and we do by these Presents for Us our Heirs and Successors, ordain and Appoint, that these Presents shall not in any manner hinder any of our Loving Subjects whatsoever from using and exercising the trade of Fishing upon the Coast of New England in America; But that they, and every, or any of them shall have full and free power and liberty to Continue and use the Trade of Fishing upon the said Coasts in any of the Seas thereunto adjoining, or any Armes of the Seas, or Salt Water, Rivers and Creeks when they have been accustomed to Fish.

— King Charles II’s Royal Charter of 1663

Fishermen and oystermen etc. took the proscription that "these Presents shall not in any manner hinder any [one] from using and exercising the trade of Fishing" to mean that governors and assemblymen had no standing to direct, tax, or assess their livelihood. By the eighteenth century, the oyster's shell was more valuable then the oyster's meat. This led to the harvesting of young oysters for their shell alone. However, colonial administrators saw the fishing privilege as a revenue stream. In 1734 the assembly outlawed the oyster burning scheme as an "unacceptable waste of oyster meats as unshucked oysters were fed into the kilns."

...attention was directed to the preservation of oysters in the bay, for large quantities of them were being taken to be burned for lime. So eager were the people in procuring materials for lime, that they gathered the shells with the oysters still alive in them, and burned them. This, of course, threatened to cause wholesale destruction of the oyster beds.

— Scientific American, 11 September 1880

In 1766 the colonial assembly mandated the use of tongs as the means of harvesting an oyster bed to avert over-fishing. 1843 in Rhode Island finally saw the supersession of the King Charles Charter of 1643 by the state's first constitution. Fisheries were specifically addressed.

The people shall continue to enjoy and freely exercise all the rights of fishery, and the privileges of the shore, to which they have been heretofore entitled under the charter and usages of this state. But no new right is intended to be granted, nor any existing right impaired, by this declaration.

— RI Constitution. Art. I, Sec. 17 (1843)

The Oyster Act of 1844 created a process that leased sections of the Rhode Island’s seabed to individuals and firms of investors interested in the oyster’s potential. The process worked well. Fees were $10 per acre, dropping down to as little as $1 per additional acre. Rice's graphs show a slow growth of leased areas from 1860 to 1900, with about 5,000 acres under cultivation at the century’s turn. Leasing fees earned the state $60 in 1844 and approximately $45,000 in 1900 in then-year dollars. Kickemuit’s fishing area was always part of this.

=== Twentieth century — fall of the Kickemuit oyster ===
Being worked on

The growth from 1900 continued, reaching 20,846 acres in 1911, 1.4 million bushels live oysters in 1908, and 1.3 million gallons of shucked meats also in 1908. That harvest was worth $135 [recte $137] million in 2006 dollars, which would be $219 million today. From there the numbers fell precipitously, settling at 7,000 acres and $20,000 by 1930 ($385,458 in 2025). As Rice says, "It was a substantial industry in its day."

The reasons for this decline are several:

- Increase raw sewage inputs. Effluent from the nearby Parker Mills, built on the western bank of the Kickemuit, and general sewage pollution killed most of Kickemuit’s oysters by 1910. In 1902 Rhode Island inspectors found cow dung in the Kickemuit’s headwaters, and a pig "wallow-hole" on the river’s banks. Parker Mills, one of New England's many textile factories, had 500 looms and 250 employees. Built in 1899, it closed in 1968.
- Cumulative effects of continued soil erosion
- Increased metal finishing effluents. The "modern electroplating process invented in England in the 1840s is well known to have been adopted as an industrial process” in Rhode Island's jewelry trade.
- The Great Depression
- 1938 New England hurricane. The Kickemuit River oyster industry ended with the Hurricane of 1938 and today exists only for recreational shell fishermen.
- Labor shortages during WWII

=== Twenty-first century — the modern era ===
Being worked on

== Geography and wildlife ==
The Kickemuit River is classified as a Salt Water Class A, Type 2 river and is described as for "low intensity use." As such, it is open to both recreational activities and shell-fishing. The river is shallow — 5 feet (1.5 m) or less — at its headwaters and along its banks, and deeper — 16 feet (4.9 m) — as it widens. Typical Narragansett Bay marine life is common in the river’s waters, including blueback herring, alewives, and American shad which spawn there, while Atlantic menhaden and silverside fish seasonally return over the summer mooths.

The Kickemuit headwaters are a migratory waypoint for some bird species, and a winter destination for others. Ospreys and owls nest on the banks of the Kickemuit.

The fields on the eastern shores offer an ideal bird habitat, providing both cover in the hedgerow borders and foraging in open fields. The variety of habitats — agricultural fields, forest, open water, freshwater and saltwater support deer, fox, raccoon opossum, coyote, woodchuck, and birds such as eastern meadow lark, sparrows, red-tailed hawk, ring-necked pheasant, killdeer, woodpeckers, orchard oriole, cardinal, owls and many others.

— Kickemuit River Loop Trail: Warren Bristol Loop (2012)

The Kickemuit River Council, the agency responsible for many of the references used herein, was formed in 2001. While it dissolved in 2022, its work remains relevant.

== Course ==
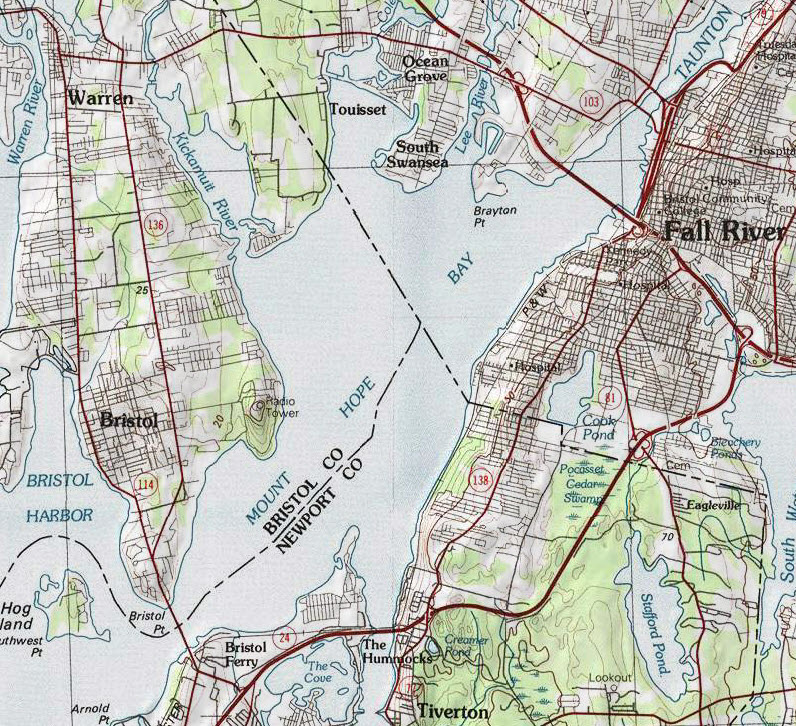
Map of Mount Hope Bay. The Kickemuit River is in the upper left corner. Note its alternate spelling. The Bristol Narrows are immediately below the word River.

The river's source is in Rehoboth, Massachusetts in the swamps north of Locust Street in Swansea. Since 1883, the river flowed due south to Swansea and into the Warren Reservoir, which drained approximately 2,300 acres (9.3 km^{2}). From then until early 2024, the reservoir's dam formed the boundary between fresh and salt water. In January 2024, with the reservoir out-of-service since 1998, the 250-foot dam was demolished. The Kickemuit River returned to historic tidal flow.

From the dam’s former site, the river flows generally southwest, then southeast to Mount Hope Bay, passing to the east of the center of the town of Warren, Rhode Island and ending with Bristol, Rhode Island to the west with part of Warren, Rhode Island to the east. The river exits in a passage through the Bristol Narrows into Mount Hope Bay.

== Crossings ==
Below is a list of crossings over the Kickemuit River. The list starts at the headwaters and goes downstream.

- Swansea, Massachusetts
  - Locust Street
  - Reed Street
  - Interstate 195 (I-195)
  - Stephen French Road
  - Colletti Lane
  - Grand Army of the Republic Highway (U.S. Route 6)
  - Burnside Drive
  - Lynnwood Road
  - Bushee Road
- Warren, Rhode Island
  - Schoolhouse Road
  - Child Street (RI 103)

== Tributaries ==
Heath Brook is the Kickemuit River's only named tributary, though it has many unnamed streams that also feed it.

== Gallery ==
A snow squall over the Kickemuit River
Kickemuit River panorama taken at Warren Bike Path. Remains of train bridge in center.
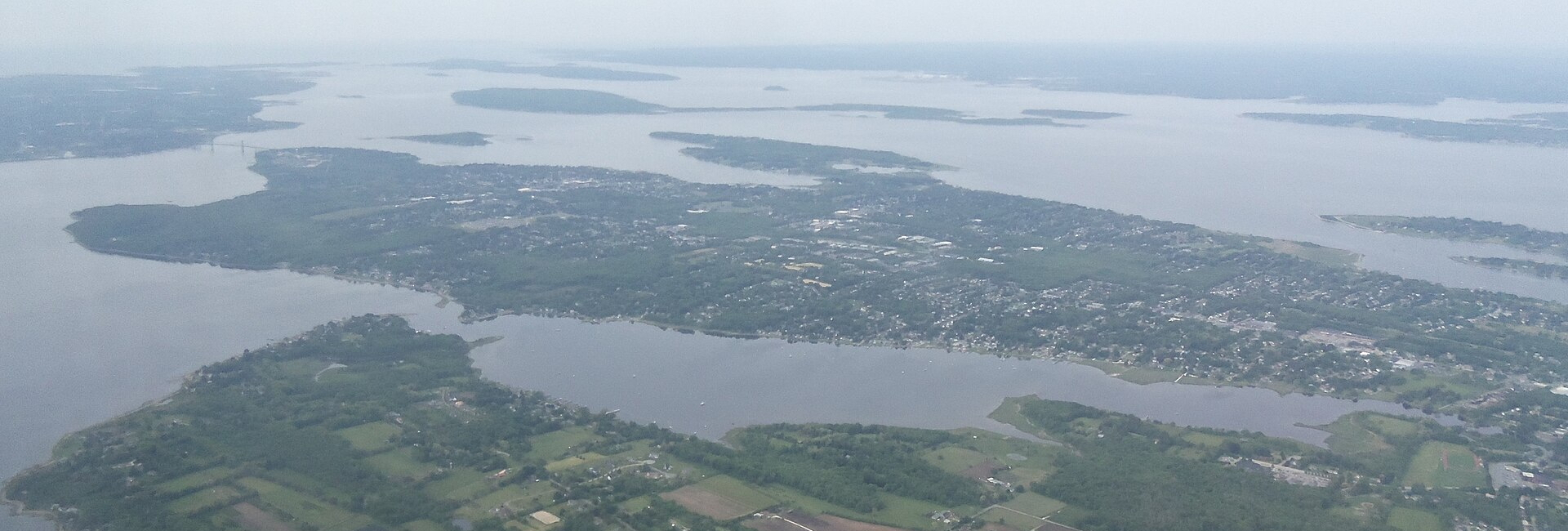
An oblique aerial view of the Kickemuit River, looking southwest. Bristol, RI is on the peninsula in the center, while the Kickemuit River at its widest is the small bay in the center, below Bristol. The Bristol Narrows are at the left end of the bay, where the river empties into Mt. Hope Bay. The Mt. Hope Bridge, both connecting Bristol with Portsmouth, RI and dividing Mt. Hope Bay from Narragansett Bay, is just visible on the left (or east) side of the Narragansett Bay. The bottom edge of this image approximates the Massachusetts/Rhode Island border.

== See also ==
- List of rivers of Massachusetts
- List of rivers of Rhode Island
