= Clear River (Rhode Island) =

River in Rhode Island, United States

Coordinates: 41.9545°N 71.6462°W

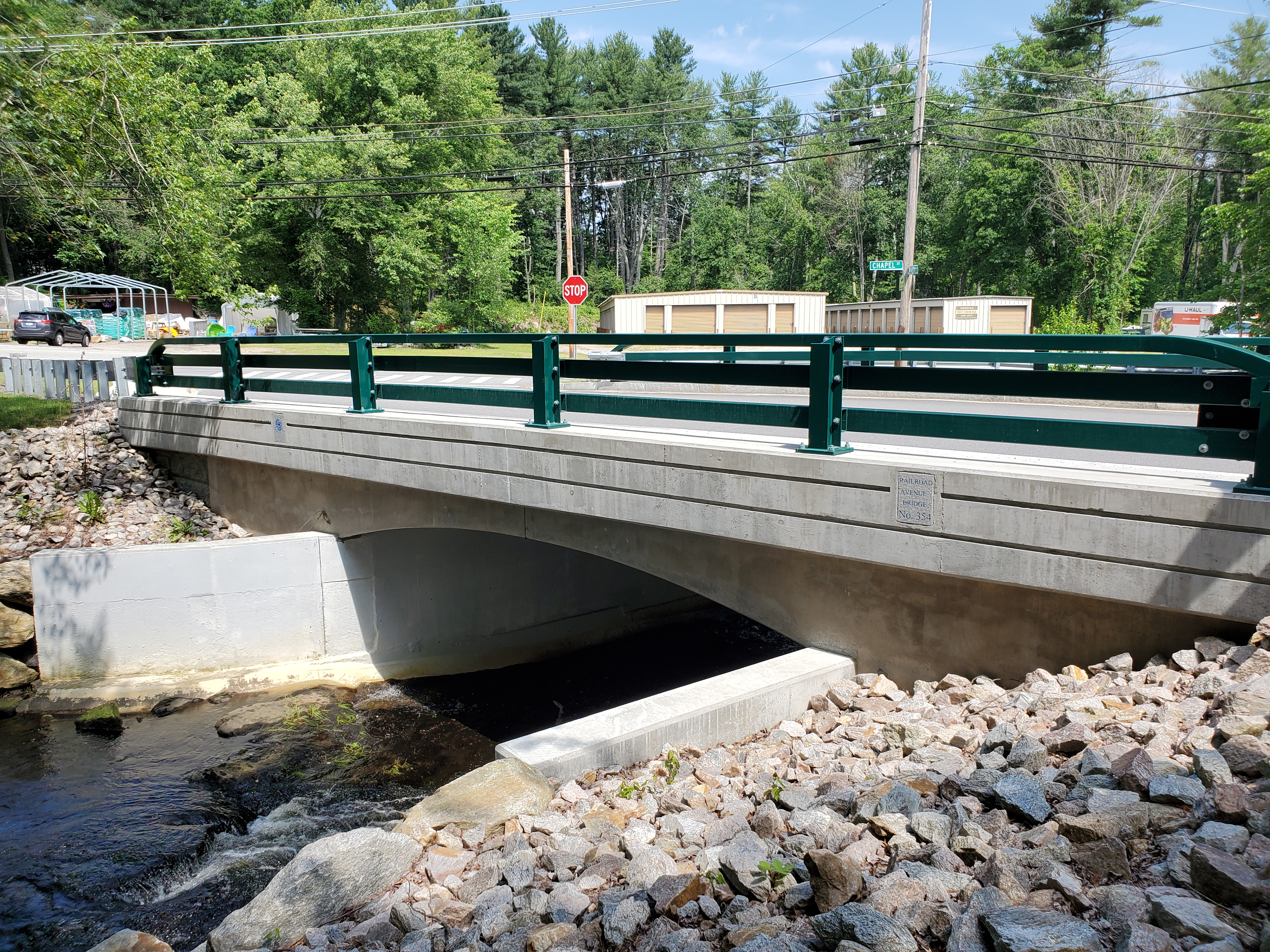
Railroad Avenue bridge in Burrillville

The Clear River is a river in the U.S. state of Rhode Island. It flows approximately 10.1 miles (16.3 km). There are five dams along the river's length.

== Course ==
The river rises from a swamp southeast of Wallum Lake in Burrillville. From there, the river flows roughly east past the villages of Pascoag and Harrisville. At Oakland, the river converges with the Chepachet River to form the Branch River.

== Crossings ==
Below is a list of all crossings over the Clear River. The list starts at the headwaters and goes downstream.

- Burrillville
  - East Wallum Lake Road
  - Warner Lane
  - Laurel Ridge Avenue
  - North Road
  - Centennial Street
  - Chapel Street (RI 107)
  - Railroad Avenue
  - Chapel Street (RI 107)
  - Hill Road
  - Sherman Farm Road (RI 98)
  - East Avenue (RI 107)
  - Broncos Highway (RI 102)
  - Victory Highway

== See also ==
- List of rivers in Rhode Island
