= Pocasset River (Rhode Island) =

River in the United States of America

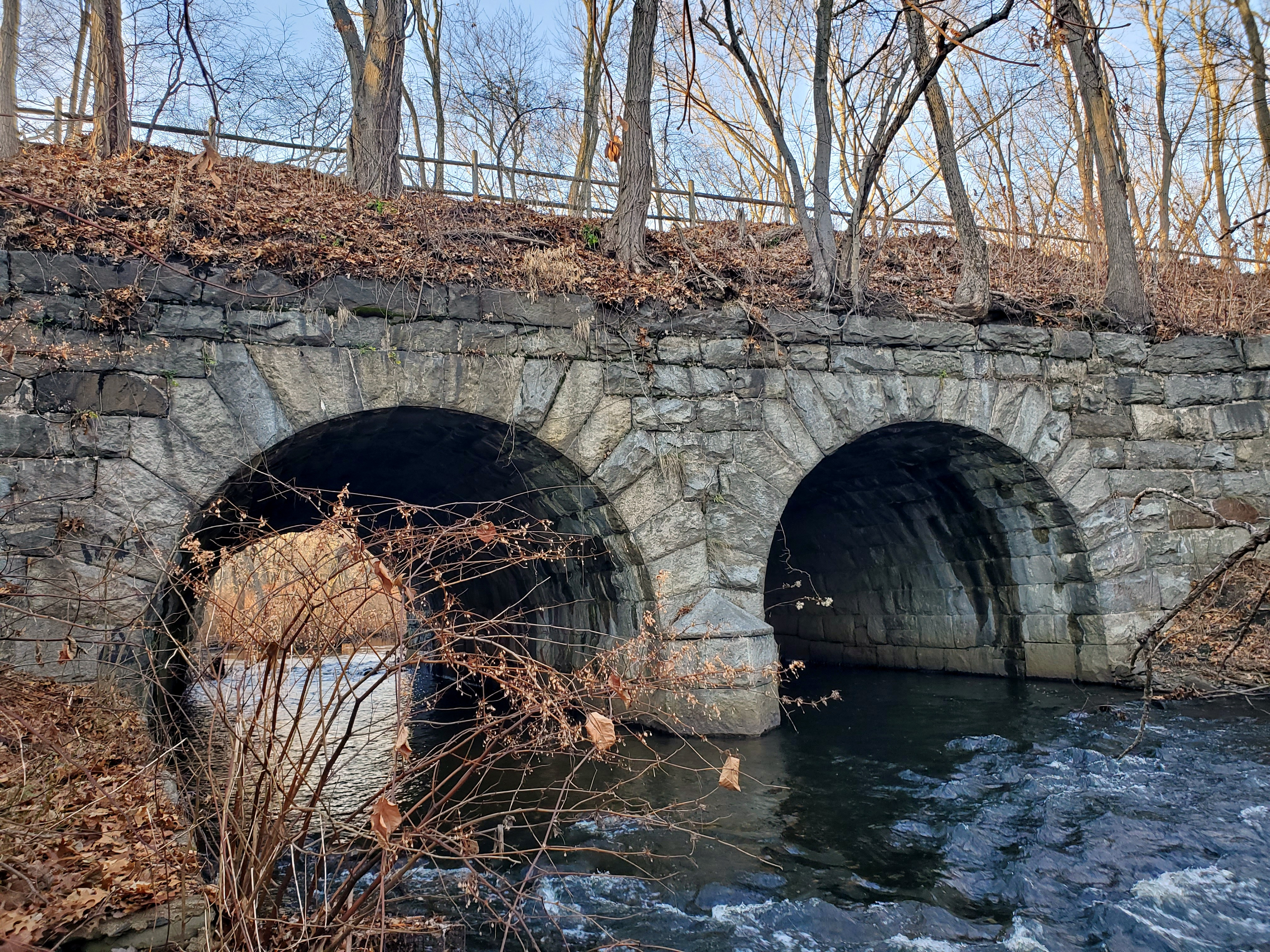
Double-arch bridge carrying the Washington Secondary Rail Trail over the river in Cranston

The Pocasset River is a river in the U.S. state of Rhode Island. It flows 12.4 miles (20.0 km). There are five dams along the river's length.

== Course ==
The Pocasset River rises between Brown Avenue and Belfield Drive in Johnston. It continues in a southeasterly direction through Johnston and Cranston, to the city line with Warwick, where it converges with the Pawtuxet River.

== Crossings ==
Below is a list of all crossings over the Pocasset River. The list starts at the headwaters and goes downstream.

- Johnston
  - Belfield Drive
  - Interstate 295
  - Memorial Avenue
  - Hartford Avenue (U.S. 6A)
  - Johnston Plaza
  - Atwood Avenue
  - U.S. 6
  - Central Avenue
  - Morgan Avenue
  - Morgan Mill Road
  - Plainfield Street (RI 14)
- Cranston
  - Pocasset Cemetery Access Road
  - Cranston Street
  - Bike Path
  - Dyer Avenue
  - Park Avenue (RI 12)
  - Reservoir Avenue (RI 2)
  - Garden City Drive
  - Pontiac Avenue

== Tributaries ==
Dry and Simmons Brooks are the only two named tributaries of the Pocasset River, though there are many unnamed streams that also feed it.

== See also ==
- List of rivers in Rhode Island
- Pawtuxet River
