= Nooseneck River =

River in Rhode Island, United States

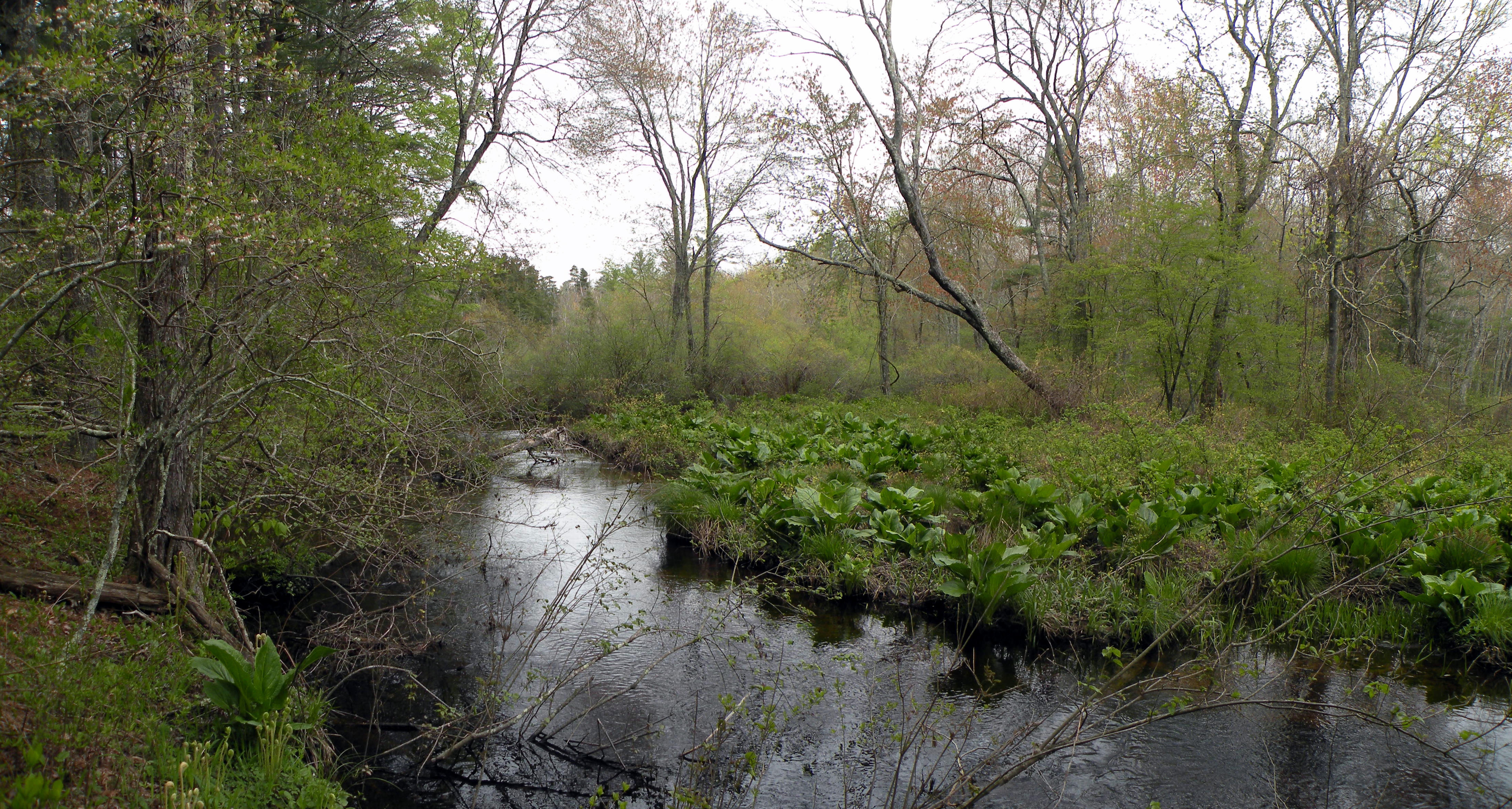
Nooseneck River

The Nooseneck River is a river in the U.S. state of Rhode Island. It flows approximately 5.5 miles (8.9 km). There are three dams along the river's length.

== Course ==
The river rises on the south side of Hammitt Hill in Coventry, then flows southeast through West Greenwich where it converges with the Congdon River to form the Big River.

Point	Coordinates (links to map & photo sources)
Coventry Center (source of river)	41.6623219°N 71.6728439°W
Hope Valley	41.6237112°N 71.6258977°W
Slocum (mouth of river)	41.6206557°N 71.6208975°W

== Crossings ==
Below is a list all crossings over the Nooseneck River. The list starts at the headwaters and goes downstream.

- West Greenwich
  - Sharpe Street
  - Fry Pond Road
  - Interstate 95
  - Nooseneck Hill Road (RI 3)

== Tributaries ==
Raccoon Brook is the Nooseneck River's only named tributary, though it has many unnamed streams that also feed it.

== See also ==
- List of rivers in Rhode Island
