= Usquepaug River =

River in Rhode Island, United States

Coordinates: 41.476181°N 71.605663°W

Location
- Country: United States
- State: Rhode Island

National Wild and Scenic River
- Designated: March 12, 2019

The Usquepaug River (US-ka-pog) is a river in the U.S. state of Rhode Island. It flows approximately 12 km (7.5 mi) and is a major tributary of the Pawcatuck River. There are two dams along the river's length.

== Course ==
The river is formed by the confluence of the Queen River and Glen Rock Brook, just above the village of Usquepaug. The river flows into Glen Rock Reservoir, then south through Usquepaug and on to the Pawcatuck River.

== Crossings ==
Below is a list of all crossings over the Usquepaug River. The list starts at the headwaters and goes downstream.

- Richmond
  - Old Usquepaug Road
  - Kingstown Road
  - South County Trail (RI 2)

== Tributaries ==
Chickasheen Brook is the Usquepaug River's only named tributaries, though it has many unnamed streams that also feed it.

== See also ==
- List of rivers in Rhode Island
- Pawcatuck River
- Queen River
