= Mill River (Massachusetts–Rhode Island) =

River in Massachusetts and Rhode Island, United States

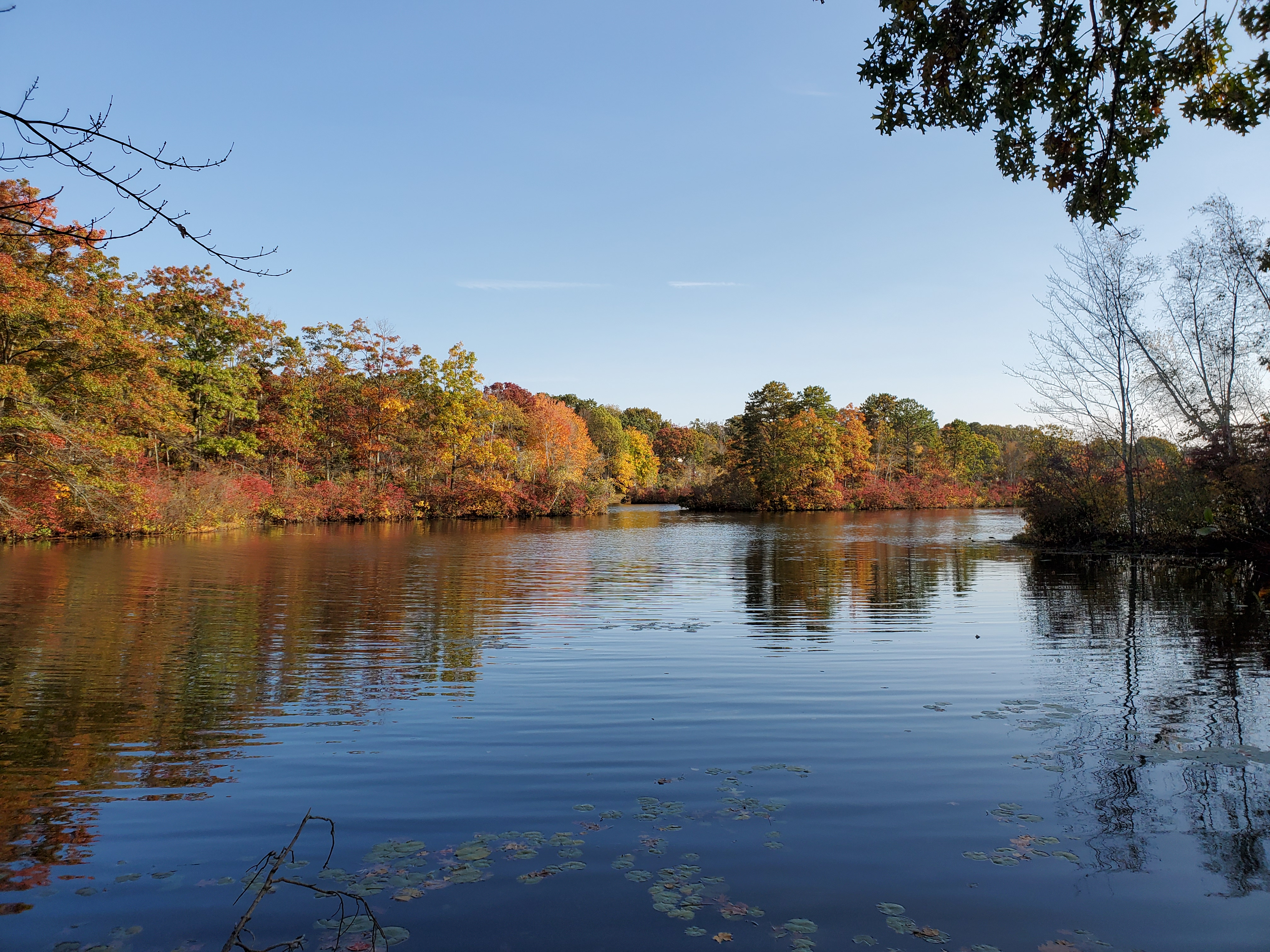
Harris Pond on Mill River in Blackstone, Massachusetts

The Mill River is a river in the U.S. states of Massachusetts and Rhode Island. It flows approximately 17.1 miles (27.5 km).

== Course ==
The river rises at North Pond in Hopkinton, Massachusetts, near Interstate 495. From there, the river flows south into Worcester County where it forms the boundary between Upton and Milford. It continues south through Hopedale, Mendon, and Blackstone to Rhode Island, where the rivers flows through Woonsocket to its confluence with the Blackstone River.

== Crossings ==
Below is a list of all crossings over the Mill River. The list starts at the headwaters and goes downstream.

- Hopkinton
  - Elm Street
  - West Elm Street
  - West Main Street
- Upton
  - Reservoir Road
  - East Street
  - Fiske Mill Road
- Hopedale
  - West Street (MA 140)
  - Freedom Street
  - Mendon Street
  - Mill Street
- Mendon
  - Hartford Avenue
  - Bellingham Street
  - Colonial Drive
- Blackstone
  - Elm Street
  - Summer Street
- Woonsocket
  - Privilege Street (RI 114)
  - East School Street

== Tributaries ==
In addition to many unnamed tributaries, the following brooks also feed the Mill:

- Muddy Brook
- Round Meadow Brook
- Hop Brook
- Quick Stream

== See also ==
- List of rivers in Massachusetts
- List of rivers in Rhode Island
