= Carr River =

River in Rhode Island, United States

Coordinates: 41°38′33″N 71°36′41″W

The Carr River is a river in Kent County in the U.S. state of Rhode Island. It flows approximately 6 km (4 mi). There are three dams along the river's length.

== Course ==
The river rises from Carr Pond in West Greenwich. It flows roughly due west past Tarbox and Capwell Mill ponds to its confluence with the Big River.

== Crossings ==
Below is a list of all crossings over the Carr River. The list starts at the headwaters and goes downstream.

- West Greenwich
  - Hopkins Hill Road
  - New London Turnpike
  - Burnt Sawmill Road

== Tributaries ==
Mud Bottom Brook is the Carr River's only named tributary, though several unnamed streams also feed it.

== See also ==
- List of rivers in Rhode Island
