= Congdon River =

River in Rhode Island, United States

Coordinates: 41.602672°N 71.620687°W

The Congdon River is a river in the U.S. state of Rhode Island, in the Big River State Management Area and immediately south. It flows approximately 3 km (2 mi). There are three dams along the river's length: at Rathbon Pond, Money Swamp Pond, and at Millbrook Pond.

== History ==
The river's crossing at Congdon Mill Road is the former site of a grist mill (in 1778) and later a sawmill (in 1806), and is named after Joseph Congdon, the mill's owner.

== Course ==
The river is formed in Exeter from the confluence of two unnamed streams (one leading from Millbrook Pond and one leading from Money Swamp Pond). From there, it flows to Rathbon Pond, then into West Greenwich where it converges with the Nooseneck River to form the Big River.

== Crossings ==
Congdon Mill Road in West Greenwich is the only crossing over the Congdon River due to its short length.

== Tributaries ==
The Congdon River has no named tributaries, though it has many unnamed streams which also feed it.

== See also ==
- List of rivers in Rhode Island
