= Wilde River =

River in the United States of America

Coordinates: 41.866°N 71.341°W

Wilde River is a river in Seekonk, Massachusetts and Pawtucket, Rhode Island. It begins at Bittersweet Pond in Seekonk and flows 5.2 miles to its confluence with the Ten Mile River in Pawtucket.

== Crossings ==
- Seekonk
  - Woodland Ave
  - Pine Street
  - Newman Ave (RT 152)

== West Branch ==
West Branch Wilde River is a small river in Seekonk that begins in an unnamed pond and flows 2 miles to its junction with Wilde River.

=== Crossings ===
- Seekonk
  - Pine Street
  - Tower Road

== See also ==
- List of rivers of Rhode Island
