= Peters River =

River in Massachusetts and Rhode Island, United States

Coordinates: 42.0151°N 71.4977°W

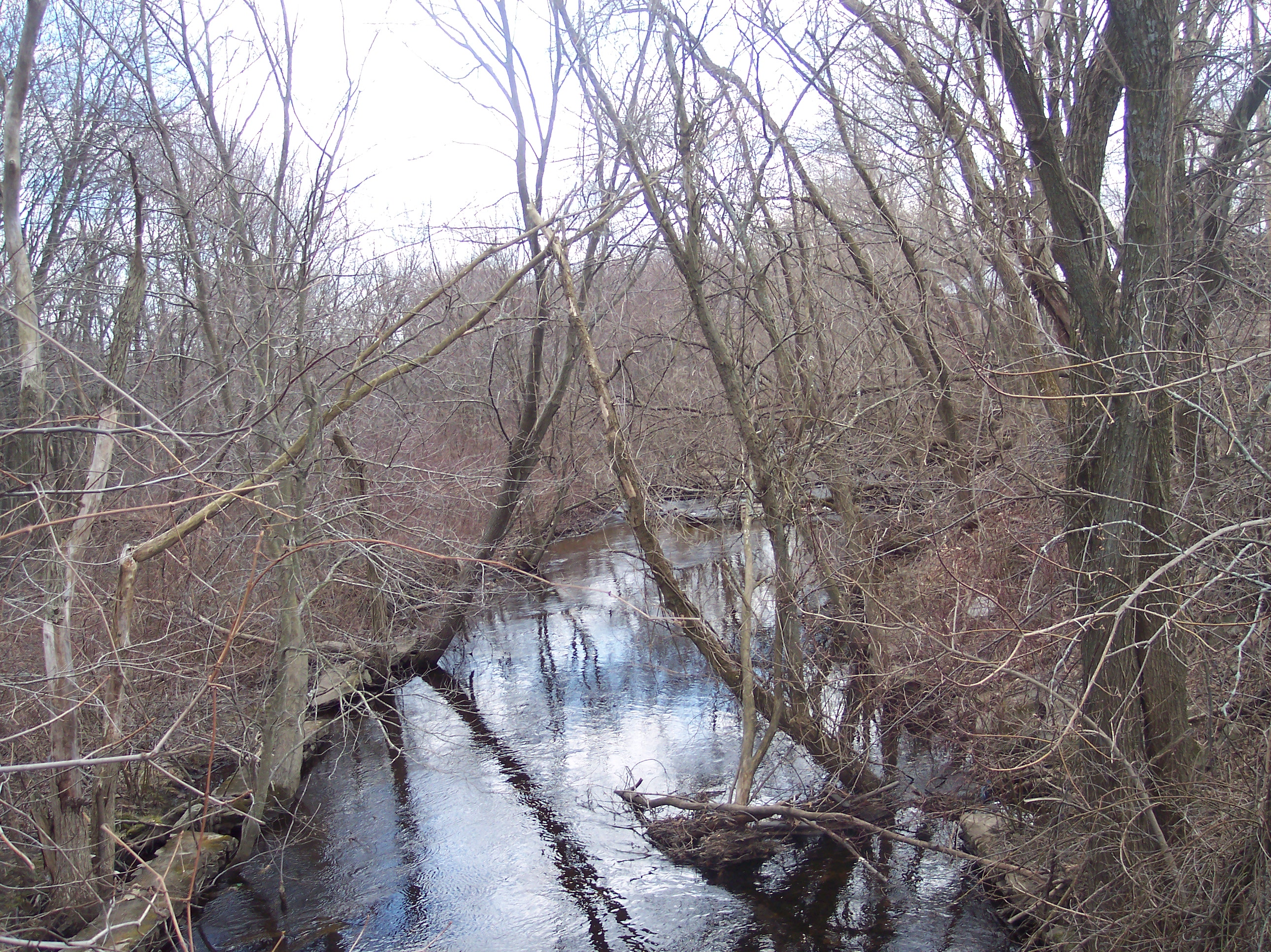
The Peters River at the Diamond Hill Road (RI 114) crossing in Woonsocket, Rhode Island.

The Peters River is a river in the U.S. states of Massachusetts and Rhode Island. It flows 7.0 miles (11.3 km).

== Course ==
The river rises from Curtis Pond in Bellingham, Massachusetts, flowing south through Bellingham and into Woonsocket, Rhode Island where is flows into the Blackstone River.

== Crossings ==
Below is a list of all crossings over the Peters River. The list starts at the headwaters and goes downstream.

- Bellingham
  - Maple Brook Road
  - Cross Street
  - Railroad Street
  - Pulaski Boulevard
  - Wrentham Road
  - Paine Street
- Woonsocket
  - Diamond Hill Road (RI 114)
  - Wood Avenue
  - Mill Street

== Tributaries ==
Arnolds and Bungay Brooks are the only two named tributaries of the Peters River, though it has many unnamed streams that also feed it.

== See also ==
- List of rivers in Massachusetts
- List of rivers in Rhode Island
- Blackstone River
