= Beaver River (Rhode Island) =

River in Rhode Island, United States

Coordinates: 41.547318°N 71.645826°W

Location
- Country: United States
- State: Rhode Island

National Wild and Scenic River
- Designated: March 12, 2019

The Beaver River is a river in the U.S. state of Rhode Island. It flows approximately 11.0 miles (17.7 km). There are three dams along the river's length. The river is also famous locally for its trout fishing in the spring.

== Course ==
The river rises from James Pond in Exeter. From there, it flows roughly due south through Exeter and Richmond to its mouth at the Pawcatuck River, across the Pawcatuck from Charlestown.

== Crossings ==
Below is a list of all crossings over the Beaver River. The list starts at the headwaters and goes downstream.

- Richmond
  - New London Turnpike
  - Old Mountain Road
  - Hillsdale Road
  - Kingstown Road (RI 138)
  - Beaver River School House Road
  - Shannock Hill Road

== Tributaries ==
The Beaver River has no named tributaries, though it has many unnamed streams that also feed it.

== See also ==
- List of rivers in Rhode Island
