= West River (Rhode Island) =

River in Rhode Island, United States

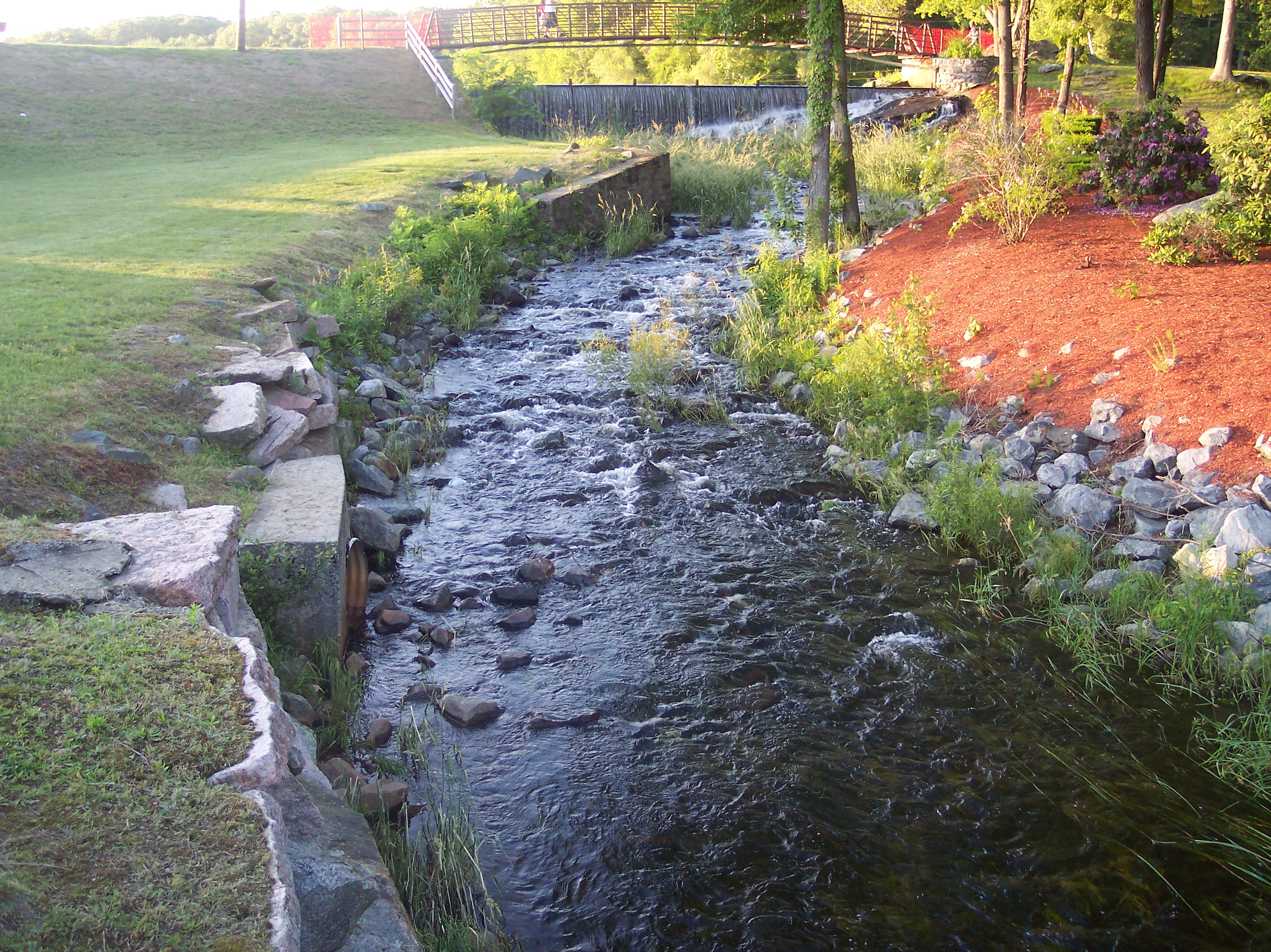
The West River just below the Wenscott Reservoir Dam in North Providence.

The West River is a river in the U.S. state of Rhode Island. It flows approximately 7.6 miles (12.2 km) and is the only named tributary of the Moshassuck River. It has a history of providing water to textile mills during the Industrial Revolution as evidenced by the 7 dams along the river's length.

== Course ==
The West River rises on the town line between Lincoln and Smithfield from a few small streams that originate in the vicinity of Lantern Road. The West River then flows southward, past Twin River Road and into Wenscott Reservoir. Below the reservoir, the river meanders east-southeast through North Providence and into Providence where it flows into the Moshassuck River north of downtown.

== Crossings ==
Below is a list of all crossings over the West River. The list starts at the headwaters and goes downstream.

- Smithfield
  - Whipple Road
    - Crosses two of the primary streams that converge south of here to form the main West River.
  - Twin River Road
- North Providence
  - Asylum Road
  - Douglas Terrace
  - Brookfarm Road
  - West River Parkway
  - Mineral Spring Avenue (RI 15)
- Providence
  - Douglas Avenue (RI 7) (Twice)
  - Veazie Street
  - Branch Avenue
  - Rhode Island State Route 146
  - Hawkins Street
  - Charles Street
  - West River Street
  - Interstate 95

== Tributaries ==
Angell Brook is the West River's only named tributary, though it has many unnamed streams that also feed it.

== See also ==
- List of rivers in Rhode Island
- Moshassuck River
