= Moshassuck River =

River in Rhode Island, United States

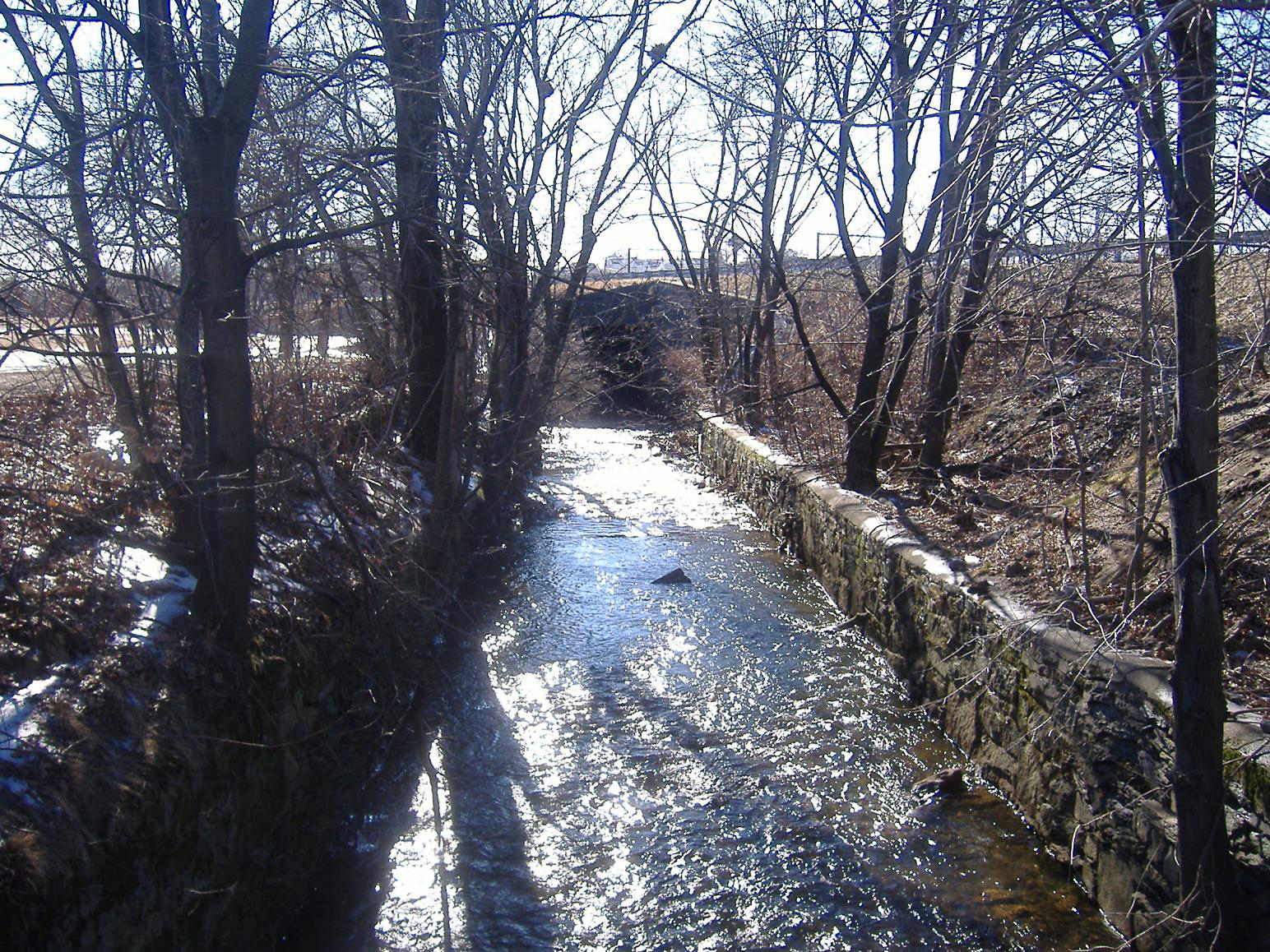
- The Moshassuck River at the North Burial Ground in Providence. View is downstream as the river is about to enter a concrete channel underneath Interstate 95.

Location
- Country: United States
- State: Rhode Island
- County: Providence County

Physical characteristics
- Source
  - location: Lime Rock Preserve, Lincoln, Rhode Island
- Mouth
  - location: Providence River, Providence, Rhode Island
  - coordinates: 41.8267°N 71.4100°W
- Length: 8.9 mi (14.3 km)

The Moshassuck River (MOE-shash-uck) is a river in the U.S. state of Rhode Island. It flows 8.9 miles (14.3 km) from the town of Lincoln to the city of Providence. There are six dams along the river's length.

== History ==
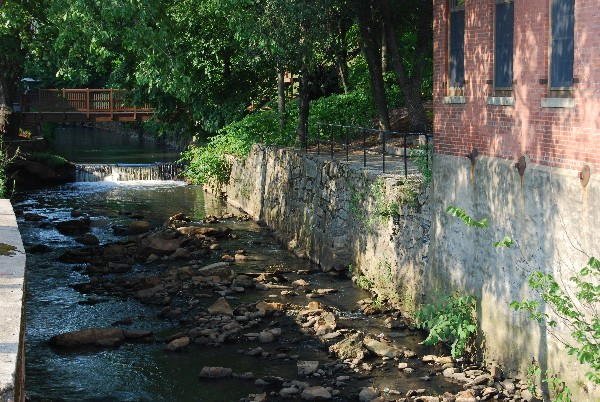
Moshassuck River near Charles Street, Providence

In 1636 Roger Williams, founder of Rhode Island, settled on the east bank of the river and was told its name by the local Narragansett people. The name "Moshassuck" means "river where moose watered".

The river became very important during the Industrial Revolution, powering numerous mills and also connecting to the Blackstone River to function as the lower section of the Blackstone Canal. The southern end of the Moshassuck River was the center for the area's earliest mills in the seventeenth and the eighteenth centuries and the location of base-metal works and textile factories in the nineteenth century. Today it contains several industrial buildings, such as the Fletcher Building, now used for retail and office space. Further north on the Moshassuck are the few remaining early-and-late nineteenth-century buildings of the Allen Printworks, a textile-printing operation. In Pawtucket along the river are the remaining structures of the Hope Webbing Company and the Lorraine Mills.

By the mid nineteenth century, the pollution in the Moshassuck River had become so bad from factories dumping both industrial and human waste into the water that Rhode Island's cholera outbreaks of 1849 and 1854 were blamed on the state of the river. The first cleanup attempt on the river was started in 1897 by building sewers.

During the twentieth century, the river steadily lost its functions as an industrial and transportation artery. When Interstate 95 was constructed during the 1960s, a 3/4 mile (1.2 km) section of the river was paved over, leaving the river underneath the road in a narrow concrete channel. The loss of industry along the river over the years has also done much to improve the quality of the water in the river; however, as of 2005, it still has the second highest fecal coliform level (2,206 units per 100 mL) of all the monitored rivers in Rhode Island.

== Course ==
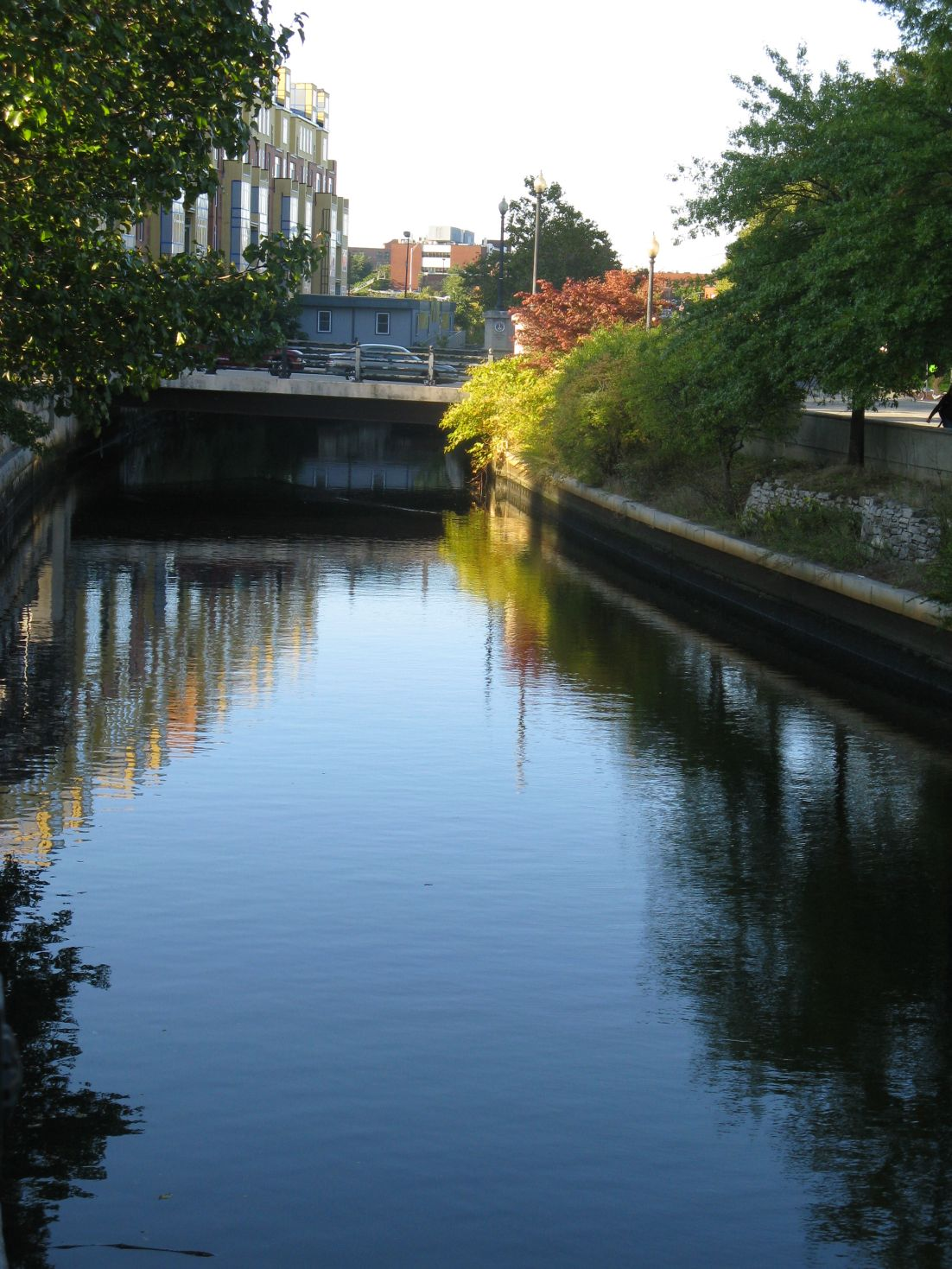
Moshassuck River in October 2008.

The Moshassuck's source is an unnamed pond within the Lime Rock Preserve in Lincoln, Rhode Island, north and west of the intersection of Wilbur Road and Route 146. It flows southeastward through Lincoln and Pawtucket toward Providence, entering the city just east of Interstate 95. It then proceeds southward to converge with the Woonasquatucket River at Steeple Street in Providence, south of Waterplace Park, to form the Providence River.

== Crossings ==
Below is a list of all crossings over the Moshassuck River. The list starts at the headwaters and goes downstream.

- Lincoln
  - Louisquisset Pike (RI 246)
  - Rhode Island State Route 146
  - Wilbur Road (same crossing as RI 146)
  - Sherman Avenue
  - Breakneck Hill Road (RI 123)
  - Great Road (RI 123) (Twice)
  - Manchester Print Works Road
  - Smithfield Avenue (RI 126)
  - Walker Street
  - Conduit Street
  - Higginson Avenue
- Pawtucket
  - Weeden Street
  - Mineral Spring Avenue (RI 15)
  - Grotto Avenue
  - Interstate 95
  - Grenville Street
- Providence
  - Smithfield Avenue (RI 126)
  - Cemetery Road
  - Interstate 95 (River underneath the road)
  - Branch Avenue (As river surfaces from underneath I-95)
  - Ramp from Branch Avenue eastbound to I-95 Northbound
  - Ramp from I-95 northbound to Branch Avenue
  - Industrial Drive
  - Randall Street
  - Stevens Street
  - Charles Street (RI 246)
  - Smith Street (U.S. 1/44)
  - Park Row
  - Steeple Street (U.S. 44 Eastbound)

== Tributaries ==
The West River is the Moshassuck River's only named tributary, however it has many unnamed streams that also feed it.

== See also ==
- List of rivers in Rhode Island
