= Chipuxet River =

River in Rhode Island, United States

Coordinates: 41.465672°N 71.565578°W

Location
- Country: United States
- State: Rhode Island

National Wild and Scenic River
- Designated: March 12, 2019

The Chipuxet River is a river in the U.S. state of Rhode Island. It flows approximately 8.5 miles (13.7 km). There are two dams along the river's length.

The river is used as the main drinking water supply for the University of Rhode Island. Due to heavy water demands on the river, it has been known to run dry at times.

== Course ==
The river rises from what is now Slocum Reservoir in Exeter. From there it flows south past the University of Rhode Island, through South Kingstown to its mouth at Worden Pond.

== Crossings ==
Below is a list of all crossings over the Chipuxet River. The list starts at the headwaters and goes downstream.

- North Kingstown
  - Railroad Avenue
- Exeter
  - Bridge Ridge Road
  - Dorset Mill Road
  - Yawgoo Valley Road
  - Wolf Rock Road
- South Kingstown
  - Kingstown Road (RI 138)

== Tributaries ==
The Chipuxet River has no named tributaries, though many unnamed streams feed it.

== See also ==
- List of rivers in Rhode Island
