= Maskerchugg River =

River in Rhode Island, United States

Coordinates: 41°40′54.7″N 71°28′55.2″W

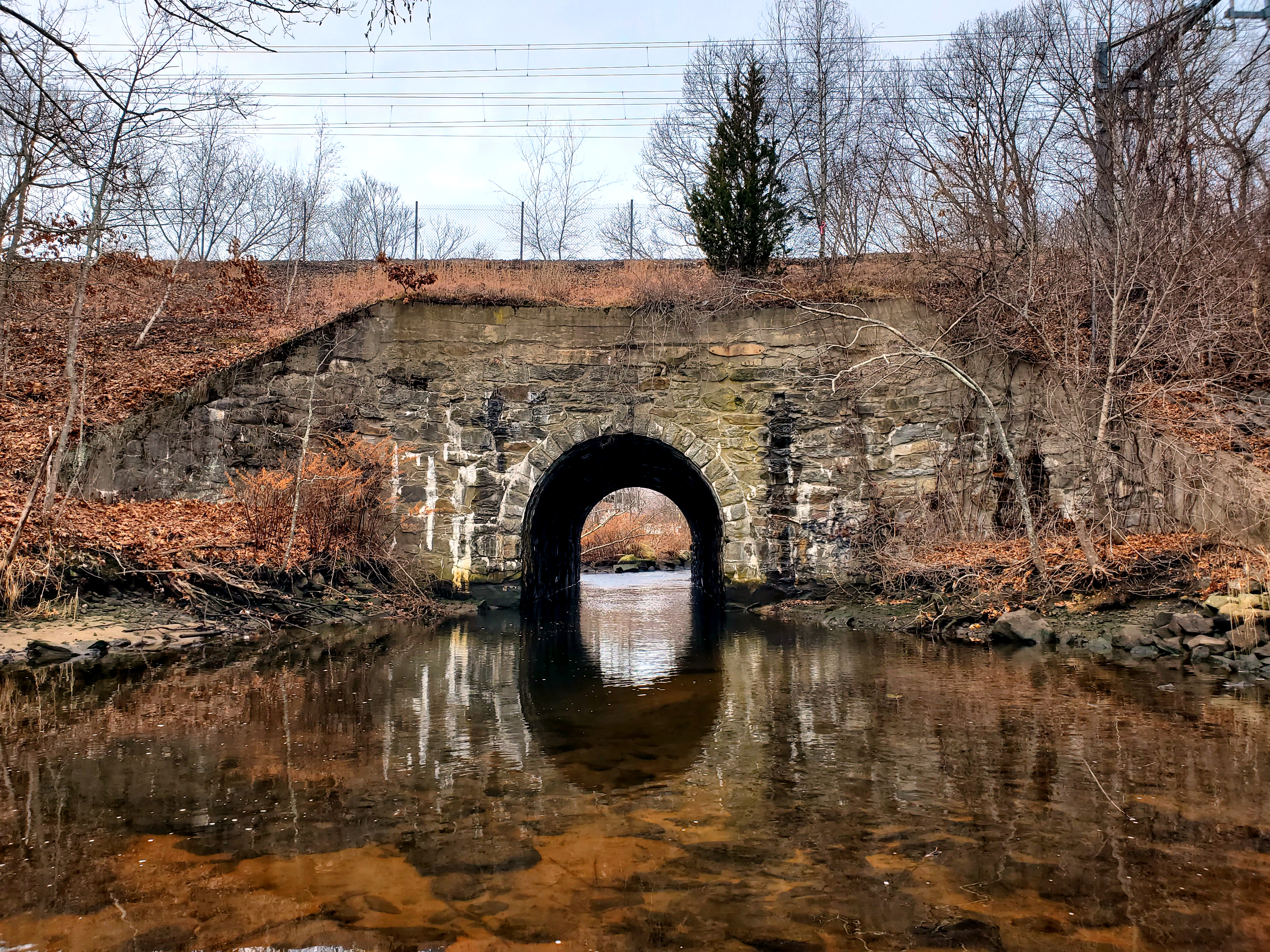
An arch bridge carrying the Northeast Corridor over the Maskerchugg River near its mouth

The Maskerchugg River is a river in the U.S. state of Rhode Island. It flows approximately 4 miles (6.4 km).

== Course ==
The river rises from an unnamed pond in Warwick near the intersection of Cowesett Road and Paddock Drive. From there, the river flows east along Cowesett Road, then turns southeast and flows past Interstate 95 to East Greenwich. The river then continues to its mouth at Greenwich Cove, on the north side of Potowomut Peninsula. Dark Entry Brook is the Maskerchugg River's only named tributary, though it has many unnamed streams that also feed it. There are four dams along the river's length.

== Crossings ==
Below is a list of all crossings over the Maskerchugg River. The list starts at the headwaters and goes downstream.

- Warwick
  - Cowesett Road (two crossings)
  - Interstate 95
- East Greenwich
  - Division Street (Route 401)
  - Sylvan Drive
  - Green Hill Way
  - Kenyon Avenue
  - Main Street (U.S. Route 1)
  - Northeast Corridor rail line

== See also ==
- List of rivers in Rhode Island
