= Maidford River =

River in Rhode Island, United States

Coordinates: 41.50527°N 71.26935°W

The Maidford River is a river in the U.S. state of Rhode Island. It flows 4.1 miles (6.6 km). There is one dam along the river's length.

== Course ==
The river rises from an unnamed pond north of Wyatt Road in Middletown. From there, it flows due south along Paradise Avenue to Sachuest Point where the river turns east and flows into the Sakonnet River.

== Crossings ==
Below is a list of all crossings over the Maidford River. The list starts at the headwaters and goes downstream.

- Middletown
  - Wyatt Road
  - Berkeley Avenue
  - Green End Avenue
  - Prospect Avenue
  - Paradise Avenue
  - Hanging Rocks Road
  - Third Beach Road

== Tributaries ==
Parardise Brook is the Maidford River's only tributary, named or unnamed.

== See also ==
- List of rivers in Rhode Island
