= Pawcatuck River =

River in the U.S. states of Rhode Island and Connecticut

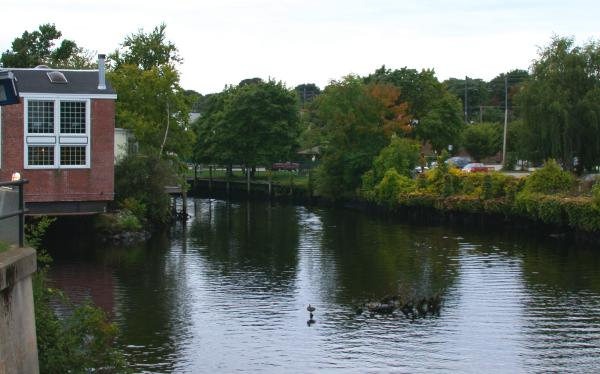
- The Pawcatuck River as it flows between Westerly, Rhode Island, and Pawcatuck, Connecticut

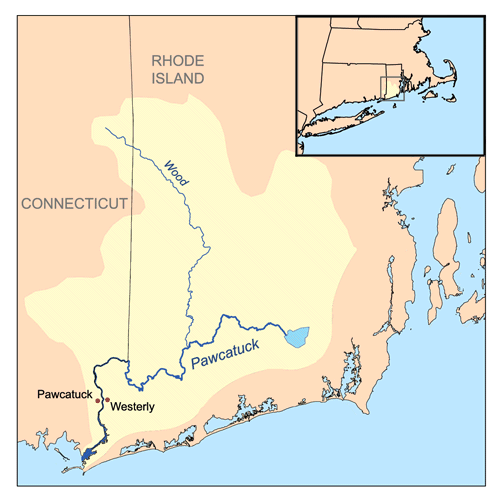
- Pawcatuck River watershed

Location
- Country: United States
- State: Connecticut / Rhode Island
- County: New London County, Connecticut Washington County, Rhode Island

Physical characteristics
- Source: Worden Pond
  - location: South Kingstown, Rhode Island
  - coordinates: 41.4423°N 71.5909°W
- Mouth: Little Narragansett Bay, Long Island Sound
  - location: Pawcatuck, Connecticut / Westerly, Rhode Island
  - coordinates: 41.32°N 71.86°W

National Wild and Scenic River
- Designated: March 12, 2019

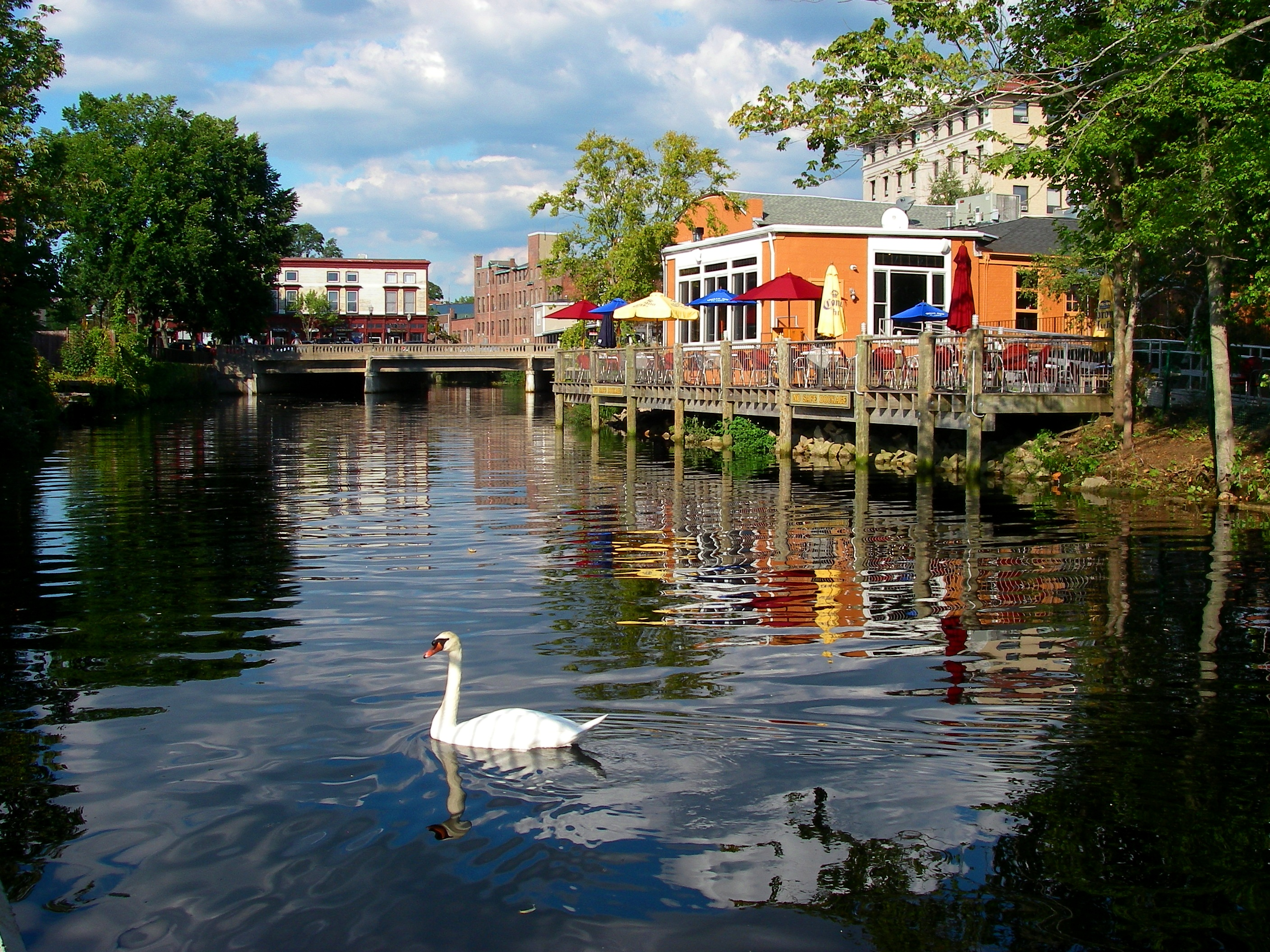
The Pawcatuck River, looking north, with Westerly, Rhode Island buildings in view, and Pawcatuck, Connecticut, just off to left

The Pawcatuck River is a river in the US states of Rhode Island and Connecticut flowing approximately 34 miles (55 km). There are eight dams along the river's length. USS Pawcatuck was named after the river.

== History ==
The river was specified as the western boundary of the Colony of Rhode Island and Providence Plantations in the original charter of 1663. It was formerly called the Charles River between its source and the mouth of the Wood River near Bradford, Rhode Island.

On April 20, 2006, an Atlantic white-sided dolphin swam several miles up the river to Westerly, Rhode Island, from Little Narragansett Bay at the east end of Fishers Island Sound. It spent several hours at Westerly-Pawcatuck, near the bridge connecting Rhode Island and Connecticut, while several hundred spectators gathered to see it. According to the Mystic Aquarium, the dolphin may have become separated from its pod at sea and had been searching for it. It was captured and taken later that night to the aquarium, where it died; it had become sick, underweight, and bruised during its journey upriver.

The Pawcatuck River flooded during a fierce rainstorm in New England on March 29, 2010, with waters overflowing into both Westerly and Pawcatuck. Both towns evacuated low-lying areas, and some historic buildings were lost to flood damage along the course of the river, and its tributaries such as a 150-year-old general store in North Stonington adjacent to the Shunock River. The bridge in downtown Westerly-Pawcatuck was closed for several weeks until the river had gone down enough for divers to inspect it for safety.

== Course ==
The Pawcatuck River's source is Worden Pond in South Kingstown, Rhode Island. It proceeds generally west and southwest through the villages of Kenyon, Carolina, and Bradford, Rhode Island. It serves as the border between the towns of Charlestown and Richmond, Rhode Island, Charlestown and Hopkinton, Rhode Island, and Hopkinton and Westerly. It turns briefly northwest and west before resuming a southward course to flow past Potter Hill, Rhode Island and between the towns of Westerly, Rhode Island and the Pawcatuck section of Stonington, Connecticut; its mouth is on Little Narragansett Bay on Long Island Sound (41.32°N 71.86°W).

== Crossings ==
Below is a list of all crossings over the Pawcatuck River. The list starts at the headwaters and goes downstream.

- Charlestown-Richmond
  - Biscuit City Road
  - South County Trail (RI 2)
  - Sherman Avenue
  - Northeast Corridor (Amtrak)
  - Shannock Road
  - Northeast Corridor (Amtrak)
  - Old Shannock Road
  - Northeast Corridor (Amtrak)
  - Carolina Back Road (RI 112)
  - Alton Carolina Road (RI 91)
  - Northeast Corridor (Amtrak)
  - Kings Factory Road
  - Northeast Corridor (Amtrak)
- Charlestown-Hopkinton
  - Burdickville Road
  - Northeast Corridor (Amtrak)
- Westerly-Hopkinton
  - Northeast Corridor (Amtrak)
  - Alton Bradford Road (RI 91/216)
  - Ashaway Road (RI 3)
  - Potter Hill Road
- Westerly-North Stonington
  - Boombridge Road
- Westerly-Stonington
  - Bridge Road
  - Westerly Bypass (RI 78)
  - Stillman Avenue
  - Northeast Corridor (Amtrak)
  - Broad Street (US 1)

== Tributaries ==
In addition to many unnamed tributaries, the following brooks and rivers feed the Pawcatuck:

- Usquepaug River
- Pusquiset Brook
- Beaver River
- Taney Brook
- White Brook
- Meadow Brook
- Wood River
- Poquiani Brook
- Tomaquag Brook
- McGowan Brook
- Aguntaug Brook
- Ashaway River
- Shunock River
- Mastuxet Brook

== See also ==
- List of rivers in Rhode Island
- List of rivers in Connecticut
