= Queen River (Rhode Island) =

River in Rhode Island, United States

Coordinates: 41.5533°N 71.5564°W

Location
- Country: United States
- State: Rhode Island

National Wild and Scenic River
- Designated: March 12, 2019

The Queen River is a river in the U.S. state of Rhode Island. It flows approximately 10.7 miles (17.2 km). There is one dam along the river's length.

== Course ==
The river rises out of Dead Swamp in West Greenwich and flows due south through Exeter and into South Kingstown where it converges with Glen Rock Brook to become the Usquepaug River.

== Crossings ==
Below is a list of all crossings over the Queen River. The list starts at the headwaters and goes downstream.

- Exeter
  - Ten Rod Road (RI 102)
  - William Reynolds Road
  - Mail Road
- South Kingstown
  - Dugway Road

== Tributaries ==
In addition to many unnamed tributaries, the following brooks feed the Queen:

- Sodom Brook
- Locke Brook
- Rake Factory Brook

== See also ==
- List of rivers in Rhode Island
- Usquepaug River
