= List of rivers of Massachusetts =

List of rivers of Massachusetts (U.S. state).

All Massachusetts rivers flow to the Atlantic Ocean. The list is arranged by drainage basin from north to south, with respective tributaries indented under each larger stream's name, arranged travelling upstream along the larger stream.

== By drainage basin ==
=== Gulf of Maine north of Cape Ann ===
- Blackwater River
  - Little River

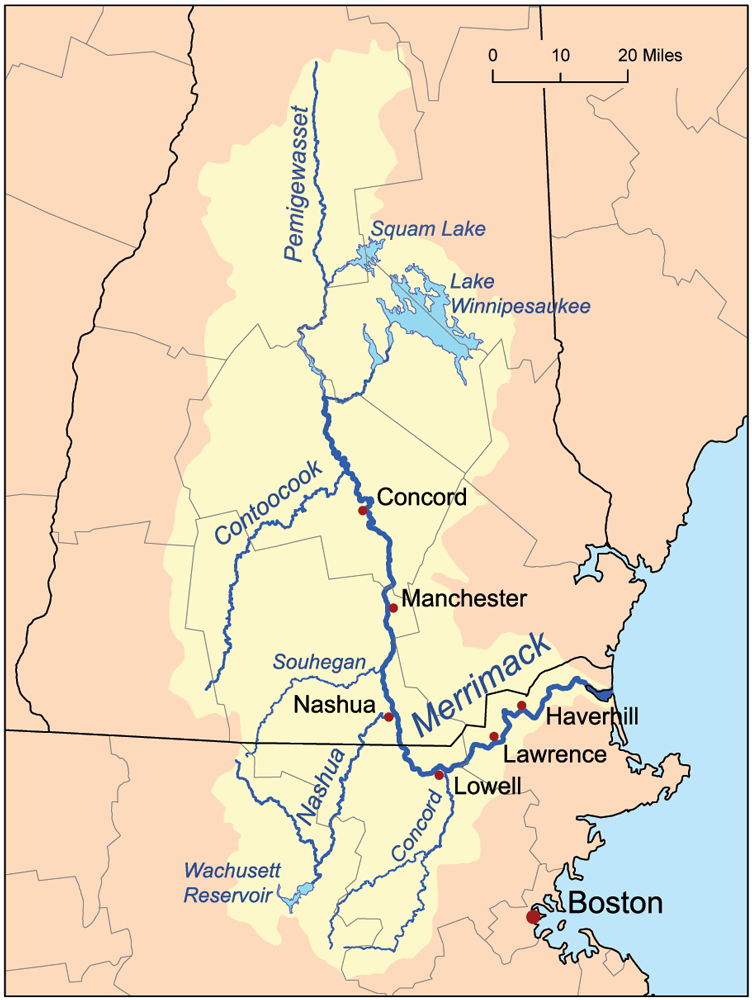
Merrimack River watershed

- Merrimack River
  - Back River (Merrimack River tributary)
  - Powwow River
    - Back River (Lake Attitash)
    - Back River (Powwow River tributary)
  - Artichoke River
  - Indian River
  - East Meadow River
  - Little River
  - Cochichewick River
  - Shawsheen River
  - Spicket River
  - Concord River
    - Assabet River
    - Sudbury River
  - Beaver Brook
  - Salmon Brook
  - Nashua River
    - Nissitissit River
    - Squannacook River
    - Still River
    - South Nashua River
      - Quinapoxet River
      - Stillwater River
    - North Nashua River
      - Whitman River
      - Phillips Brook
  - Souhegan River (New Hampshire)
    - South Branch Souhegan River
- Parker River
  - Little River
  - Mill River
- Rowley River
  - Roger Island River
  - Egypt River
- Eagle Hill River
- Ipswich River
  - Miles River
  - Martins Brook
    - Skug River
- Castle Neck River
- Essex River
  - Farm Creek
  - Walker Brook
- Annisquam River
  - Jones River
  - Little River
  - Mill River

=== Massachusetts Bay ===
- Danvers River
  - North River
  - Bass River
- Forest River
- Saugus River
  - Pines River
  - Mill River
- Mystic River
  - Chelsea Creek
  - Island End River
  - Malden River
  - Alewife Brook
    - Little River
  - Aberjona River

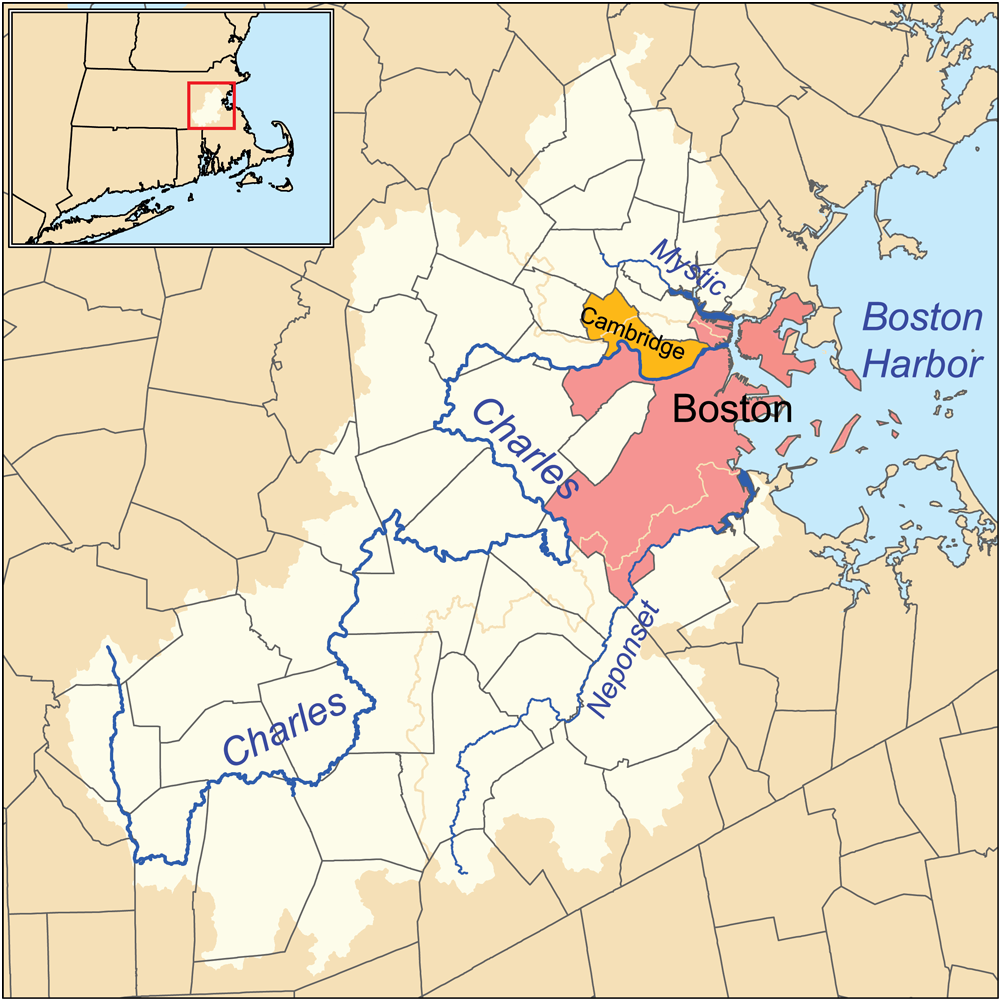
Boston Harbor watershed

- Charles River
  - Muddy River
  - Stop River
  - Mill River
  - West Branch Charles River
  - Stony Brook (Waltham)
  - Stony Brook (Boston) (covered culvert)
- Neponset River
  - Canton River, a.k.a. East Branch Neponset River
  - Mother Brook
- Weymouth Fore River
  - Monatiquot River
    - Cochato River
    - Farm River
      - Blue Hill River
- Weymouth Back River
  - Fresh River
  - Mill River
    - Old Swamp River
- Weir River
  - Crooked Meadow River
    - Plymouth River
- Bound Brook (In 1640, Bound Brook formed the border between the Massachusetts Bay and Plymouth colonies.)
  - Aaron River
- North River
  - East Branch North River
  - Indian Head River
    - Drinkwater River
  - West Branch North River
- South River

=== Cape Cod Bay ===
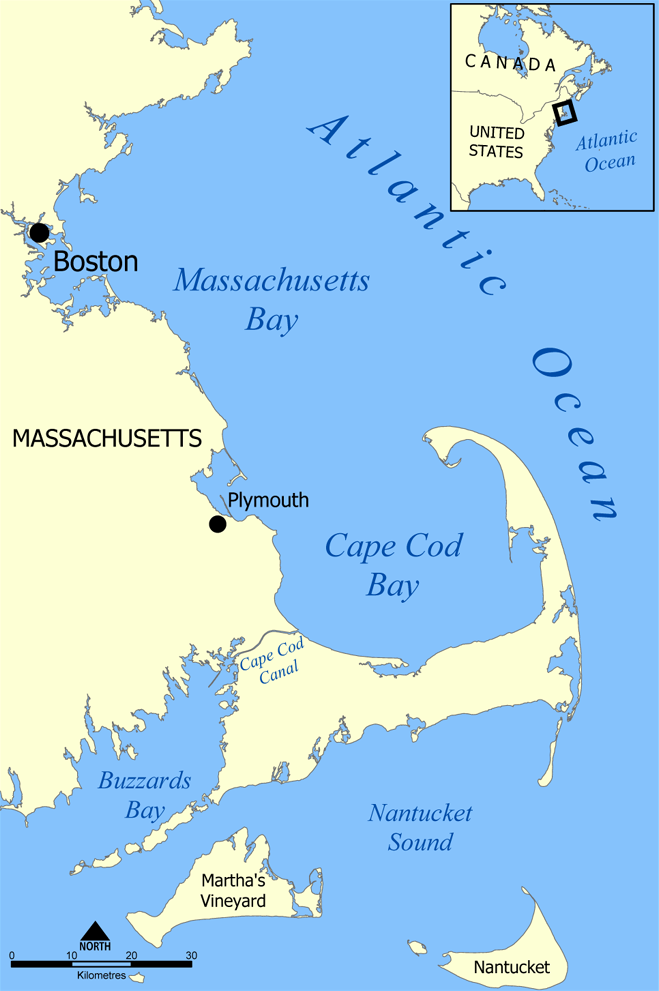
Map showing Cape Cod Bay and other major waters off Massachusetts

- Green Harbor River
- Back River
  - Pine Point River
  - Great Wood Island River
  - Little Wood Island River
  - Duck Hill River
    - Bourne Wharf River
- Bluefish River
- Jones River
- Town Brook
- Eel River
- Boat Meadow River
- Pamet River
- Little Pamet River
- Herring River (Wellfleet, Massachusetts)

=== Nantucket Sound ===
- Mitchell River
- Oyster Pond River
- Andrews River
- Red River
- Swan Pond River
- Bass River
- Parkers River
- Centerville River
  - Bumps River
- Marstons Mill River
- Little River
- Santuit River
- Mashpee River
- Quashnet River
- Childs River
  - Seapit River
- Coonamesset River

=== Martha's Vineyard ===
- Tiasquam River

=== Buzzards Bay ===
- Wild Harbor River
- Pocasset River
- Back River
- Wareham River
  - Crooked River
  - Broad Marsh River
  - Agawam River
  - Wankinco River
- Weweantic River
  - Sippican River
    - East Branch Sippican River
    - West Branch Sippican River
- Mattapoisett River
- Nasketucket River
- Acushnet River
  - Keene River
- Little River
- Slocums River
  - Paskamanset River
- Westport River
  - East Branch Westport River
    - Shingle Island River
      - Copicut River
  - West Branch Westport River

=== Narragansett Bay ===
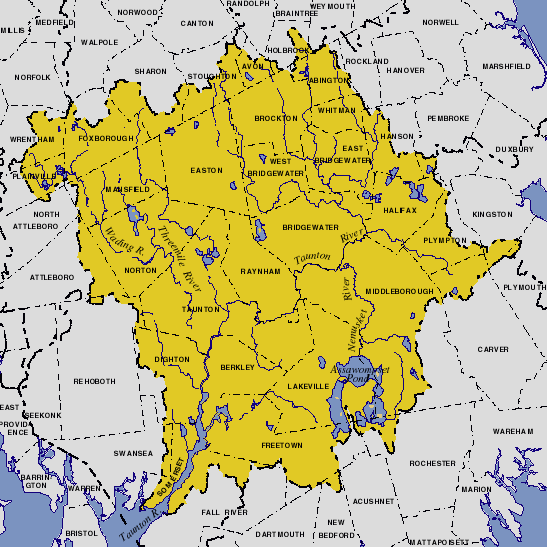
Taunton River watershed

- Taunton River
  - Quequechan River
  - Assonet River
    - Cedar Swamp River
  - Segreganset River
  - Three Mile River
    - Rumford River
    - Wading River
  - Mill River
    - Snake River
      - Canoe River
  - Forge River
  - Cotley River
  - Nemasket River
  - Winnetuxet River
  - Matfield River
    - Satucket River
      - Poor Meadow Brook
        - Shumatuscacant River
          - Stream River
    - Salisbury Plain River
  - Town River
    - Hockomock River
- Lees River
- Cole River
- Kickemuit River
- Warren River (Rhode Island)
  - Barrington River (Rhode Island)
    - Runnins River
  - Palmer River
    - East Branch Palmer River
    - West Branch Palmer River

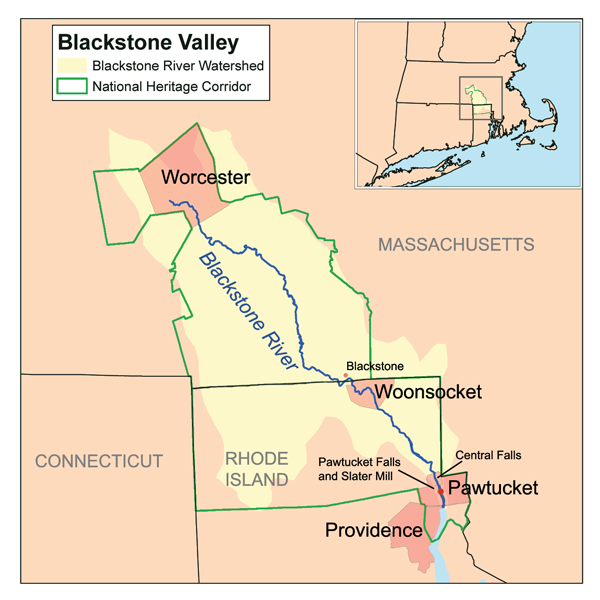
Blackstone River watershed

- Seekonk River (Rhode Island)
  - Ten Mile River
    - Wilde River
    - Sevenmile River
    - Bungay River
  - Blackstone River
    - Abbott Run
    - Peters River
    - Mill River
    - Branch River (Rhode Island)
      - Clear River (Rhode Island)
        - Nipmuc River (Rhode Island)
          - Chockalog River
    - West River
    - Mumford River
    - Quinsigamond River
    - Middle River
      - Kettle Brook

=== Long Island Sound ===
Connecticut River watershed

- Thames River (Connecticut)
  - Shetucket River (Connecticut)
    - Quinebaug River
      - French River
        - Little River
          - South Fork Little River
- Connecticut River
  - Farmington River (Connecticut)
    - East Branch Farmington River (Connecticut)
      - Hubbard River
    - West Branch Farmington River
      - Clam River
        - Buck River
      - Fall River (Farmington River tributary)
  - Scantic River
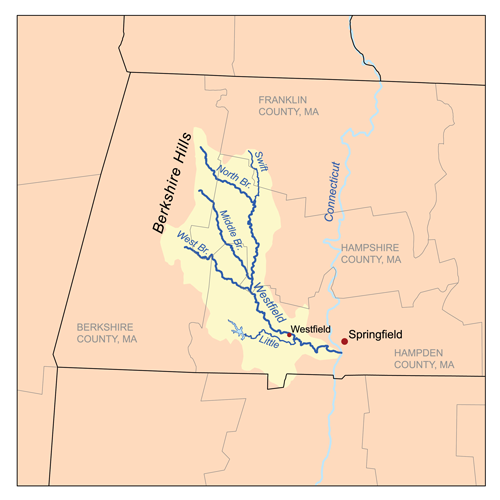
    Westfield River watershed
  - Westfield River
    - Great Brook
    - Little River (Westfield River, South)
    - West Branch Westfield River
    - Middle Branch Westfield River
    - Little River (Westfield River, North)
    - Swift River
      - North Branch Swift River
  - Mill River (Springfield, Massachusetts)
    - North Branch Mill River
    - South Branch Mill River
  - Chicopee River
    - Quaboag River
      - East Brookfield River
        - Sevenmile River
          - Cranberry River
        - Fivemile River
    - Ware River
      - Swift River
        - Quabbin Reservoir
          - West Branch Swift River
          - East Branch Swift River
          - East Branch Fever Brook
          - West Branch Fever Brook
          - Middle Branch Swift River
      - Prince River
      - Burnshirt River
      - East Branch Ware River
      - West Branch Ware River
  - Stony Brook
  - Manhan River
    - North Branch Manhan River
  - Mill River (Northampton, Massachusetts)
    - East Branch Mill River
    - West Branch Mill River
  - Fort River
  - Mill River (Hatfield, Massachusetts)
  - Mill River (Hadley, Massachusetts)
  - Sawmill River
  - Deerfield River
    - Green River (Deerfield River tributary)
    - South River
    - Bear River
    - North River
      - East Branch North River
      - West Branch North River
    - Chickley River
    - Cold River
      - Green River (Cold River tributary)
  - Fall River (Connecticut River tributary)
  - Millers River
    - Tully River
      - East Branch Tully River
      - West Branch Tully River
    - Otter River
    - Priest Brook
    - North Branch Millers River

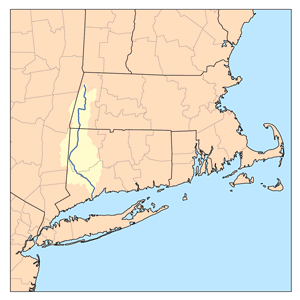
Housatonic River watershed

- Housatonic River
  - Blackberry River (Connecticut)
    - Whiting River
  - Konkapot River
    - Umpachene River
  - Green River
  - Williams River
  - Hop Brook
    - Mad River
  - West Branch Housatonic River
    - Southwest Branch Housatonic River
  - East Branch Housatonic River

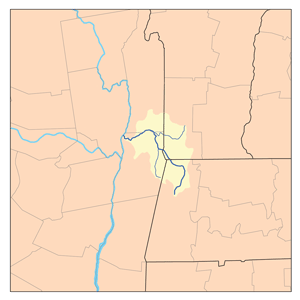
Hoosic River watershed

=== New York Harbor ===
- Hudson River (New York)
  - Kinderhook Creek
  - Hoosic River
    - Green River
    - North Branch Hoosic River

== Alphabetically ==
- Aaron River
- Abbott Run
- Aberjona River
- Acushnet River
- Agawam River
- Alewife Brook
- Andrews River
- Annisquam River
- Artichoke River
- Assabet River
- Assonet River
- Back River (Buzzards Bay)
- Back River (Lake Attitash)
- Back River (Massachusetts Bay)
- Back River (Merrimack River tributary)
- Back River (Powwow River tributary)
- Barrington River
- Bass River (Danvers River tributary)
- Bass River (Nantucket Sound)
- Batchelor Brook
- Bear River
- Beaver Brook
- Blackstone River
- Blackwater River
- Blue Hill River
- Bluefish River
- Boat Meadow River
- Bourne Wharf River
- Broad Marsh River
- Buck River
- Bumps River
- Bungay River
- Burnshirt River
- Canoe River
- Castle Neck River
- Cedar Swamp River
- Centerville River
- Charles River
- Chickley River
- Chicopee River
- Childs River
- Chockalog River
- Clam River
- Cochato River
- Cochichewick River
- Cold River
- Cole River
- Concord River
- Connecticut River
- Coonamesset River
- Copicut River
- Cotley River
- Cranberry River
- Crooked Meadow River
- Crooked River
- Deerfield River
- Drinkwater River
- Duck Hill River
- Eagle Hill River
- East Branch Green River
- East Branch Housatonic River
- East Branch Mill River
- East Branch Neponset River
- East Branch North River
- East Branch Palmer River
- East Branch Sippican River
- East Branch Swift River
- East Branch Tully River
- East Branch Ware River
- East Branch Westport River
- East Brookfield River
- East Meadow River
- Eel River
- Egypt River
- Essex River
- Fall River (Connecticut River tributary)
- Fall River (Farmington River tributary)
- Farm River
- Five Mile River
- Forest River
- Forge River
- Fort River
- French River
- Fresh River
- Great Brook (Westfield River tributary)
- Green Harbor River
- Green River (Cold River tributary)
- Green River (Deerfield River tributary)
- Green River (Hoosic River tributary)
- Green River (Housatonic River tributary)
- Herring River
- Hockomock River
- Hoosic River/Hoosac River
- Housatonic River
- Hubbard River
- Indian Head River
- Indian River
- Ipswich River
- Jones River (Annisquam River tributary)
- Jones River (Kingston Bay)
- Keene River
- Kettle Brook
- Kickemuit River
- Kinderhook Creek
- Konkapot River
- Lees River
- Little Pamet River
- Little River (Alewife Brook tributary)
- Little River (Annisquam River tributary)
- Little River (Blackwater River tributary)
- Little River (Cotuit Bay)
- Little River (French River tributary)
- Little River (Merrimack River tributary)
- Little River (Parker River tributary)
- Little River (Slocums River tributary)
- Little River (Westfield River, North)
- Little River (Westfield River, South)
- Little Wood Island River
- Long Pond River
- Mad River
- Malden River
- Manhan River
- Marstons Mill River
- Mashpee River
- Matfield River
- Mattapoisett River
- Merrimack River
- Middle Branch Swift River
- Middle Branch Westfield River
- Middle River
- Miles River
- Mill River (Annisquam River tributary)
- Mill River (Charles River tributary)
- Mill River (Hadley, Massachusetts)
- Mill River (Hatfield, Massachusetts)
- Mill River (Massachusetts–Rhode Island)
- Mill River (Northampton, Massachusetts)
- Mill River (Parker River tributary)
- Mill River (Saugus River tributary)
- Mill River (Springfield, Massachusetts)
- Mill River (Taunton River tributary)
- Mill River (Weymouth Back River tributary)
- Millers River
- Mitchell River
- Monatiquot River
- Mother Brook
- Muddy River
- Mumford River
- Mystic River
- Nashua River
- Nasketucket River
- Nemasket River
- Neponset River
- Nissitissit River
- North Branch Hoosic River
- North Branch Manhan River
- North Branch Mill River
- North Branch Millers River
- North Branch Swift River
- North Nashua River
- North River (Danvers River tributary)
- North River (Deerfield River tributary)
- North River (Massachusetts Bay)
- Old Swamp River
- Otter River
- Oyster Pond River
- Palmer River
- Pamet River
- Parker River
- Parkers River
- Paskamanset River
- Peters River
- Phillips Brook
- Pine Point River
- Pines River
- Plymouth River
- Pocasset River
- Poor Meadow Brook
- Powwow River
- Priest Brook
- Prince River
- Quaboag River
- Quashnet River
- Quequechan River
- Quinapoxet River
- Quinebaug River
- Quinsigamond River
- Quiquechan River
- Red River
- Roger Island River
- Rowley River
- Rumford River
- Runnins River
- Salisbury Plain River
- Salmon Brook
- Santuit River
- Satucket River
- Saugus River
- Sawmill River
- Scantic River
- Schneelock Brook
- Seapit River
- Segreganset River
- Seven Mile River (East Brookfield River tributary)
- Sevenmile River (Tenmile River tributary)
- Shawsheen River
- Shingle Island River
- Shumatuscacant River
- Sippican River
- Skug River
- Snake River
- South Branch Mill River
- South Branch Souhegan River
- South Fork Little River
- South Nashua River
- South River (Deerfield River tributary)
- South River (Massachusetts Bay)
- Southwest Branch Housatonic River
- Spicket River
- Squannacook River
- Still River
- Stillwater River
- Stony Brook
- Stop River
- Stream River
- Sudbury River
- Swan Pond River
- Swift River (Ware River tributary)
- Swift River (Westfield River tributary)
- Sudbury River
- Taunton River
- Ten Mile River
- Three Mile River
- Tiasquam River
- Town Brook
- Town River
- Tully River
- Umpachene River
- Wading River
- Walker Brook
- Wankinco River
- Ware River
- Wareham River
- Weir River
- West Branch Charles River
- West Branch Farmington River
- West Branch Green River
- West Branch Housatonic River
- West Branch Mill River
- West Branch North River
- West Branch Palmer River
- West Branch Sippican River
- West Branch Swift River
- West Branch Tully River
- West Branch Ware River
- West Branch Westfield River
- West Branch Westport River
- West River
- Westfield River
- Westport River
- Weweantic River
- Weymouth Back River
- Weymouth Fore River
- Whiting River
- Whitman River
- Wild Harbor River
- Williams River
- Winnetuxet River

== See also ==
- List of rivers in the United States
- Miskatonic River
