= Wekepeke =

Aquifer in Massachusetts, USA

Coordinates: 42.491°N 71.711°W

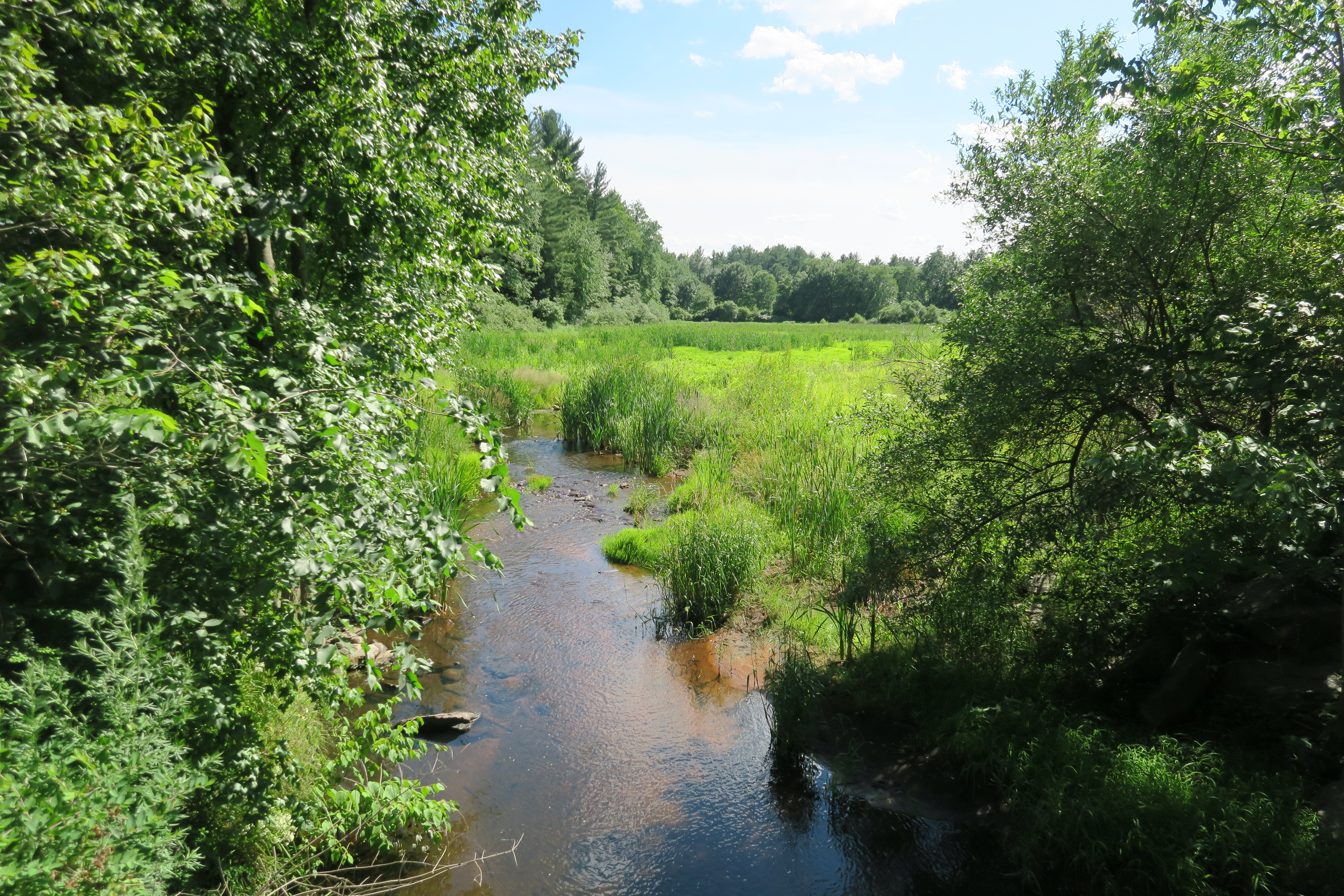
Wekepeke Brook flowing out of Bartlett Pond in Lancaster

Wekepeke is the name of an aquifer and brook in Sterling, Massachusetts, United States. The aquifer has a land surface area of 11.5 square miles (30 km^{2}).

== Wekepeke sub-basin (aquifer and brook) ==
The aquifer is primarily located in the northern part of the town of Sterling, Massachusetts. 1,448 acres (586 ha), or about 20% of the aquifer, is permanently protected land. An additional 18 acres (7.3 ha) has limited land protection. Wekepeke Brook flows 5.1 miles (8.2 km) from Heywood Reservoir at the northern boundary of Sterling with Leominster, southeast to the community of Pratt Junction in the northeast part of Sterling, then northeast into the town of Lancaster, where it ends at the North Nashua River. The brook and aquifer, via the Nashua River, are part of the Merrimack River basin. Reservoirs on the aquifer include Heywood Reservoir, Fitch Basin, Spring Basin, and Upper and Lower Lynde Basins. Lynde Basin has been classified as most threatened.

=== Geographic overview and ecosystem characteristics ===
Most of this subbasin lies in the municipality of Sterling, with parts extending into Leominster and Lancaster. Located in the Southern New England Coastal Hills and Plains eco-region of central Massachusetts, this area drains into the North Nashua River in Lancaster just below Bartlett Pond. Stream flow, as in most of New England, has significant seasonal changes. Topography is generally hilly, encompassing numerous wetlands, broad valleys, and floodplains.

=== Major water resource issues ===
The amount of permanently protected undeveloped open space and undeveloped woodland in the subbasin has meant that the water quality in the subbasin remains high. This subbasin features a network of unnamed streams and swamps. Wekepeke Brook in Sterling is one of the best cold water streams in eastern Massachusetts. It has good tree cover for shading to maintain cold water temperature, has high fertility and moderate acidity and, consequently, self-supporting populations of brook and brown trout. The headwaters of Wekepeke Brook drain to five reservoirs: Heywood Reservoir, Fitch Basin, Spring Basin, and Upper and Lower Lynde Basins (which are fed by Lynde Brook). At times in the past, Lynde Basin has been noted to be atrophic.

Sterling's Municipal Wells #2, 4 and 5, the Wekepeke Aquifer, and Leominster Zone III Area of Protection face possible contamination sources. These include Sterling's landfill in the recharge area, pesticide use in power line and railroad rights of way, and beavers, which have capitalized on the present environmental conditions and proliferated to the point of being considered a "nuisance" species. The most serious damage beavers are causing in this subbasin, in addition to increased localized flooding behind their dams, is from bacterial contamination of well water. Additionally, there is concern of potential negative impact on Wekepeke Brook from potential increased aquifer withdrawals. Also, any further development of the Wekepeke Aquifer, from residential septic systems and farming or from commercial operations, could affect the town of Lancaster's well near the North Nashua River. Lancaster has a Water Supply Protection District By-law.

== Wekepeke ownership history ==
Originally privately owned land for farming and livestock, the town of Clinton in the late 1800s petitioned the state of Massachusetts for the rights to possess the land of the Wekepeke as a Clinton public water supply. Some of the acquisition was a land purchase, while other parcels were taken by eminent domain. In the early 1960s, the Wekepeke was officially decommissioned as a town water source for Clinton, and the Wachusett Reservoir became the primary and sole water source for the town. From the 1960s on, the land was used primarily for recreational activity. In 2004, Clinton negotiated a conservation restriction (CR) to preserve the Wekepeke area. The State approved the CR and the town of Clinton residents approved the CR by vote, but the town of Clinton board never signed the CR. Currently, the town of Clinton is attempting to update the CR to make it "mutually agreeable" as was first proposed in the 2001 memorandum of understanding. Additionally, the state has an unfunded mandate that Clinton repair multiple dams on the property at an estimated cost of US$1.5 million.

== Controversy ==
The Town of Clinton purportedly intended to sell the water rights to the Wekepeke Aquifer in Sterling. In early 2007, the town of Clinton allowed Nestlé Waters-Poland Spring to test the Wekepeke aquifer as a possible water source for commercial sale. In March 2008, the town of Clinton issued an RFP to officially solicit potential buyers for water rights to the Wekepeke.

Nestle Waters of North America (NWNA) was the only company to respond to the Town of Clinton Wekepeke water RFP.

The Clinton board of selectmen rejected the Nestle proposal in the spring of 2008.

Afterwards, Nestle hired Rushing Rivers Institute to conduct a study of the river in to order to withdraw water without harming the ecosystem. The study showed a way to improve the current conditions of the river. The report also served as a foundation for a community-based effort of the Wekepeke Watershed Restoration Initiative which brought together four communities.
