= Back River (Powwow River tributary) =

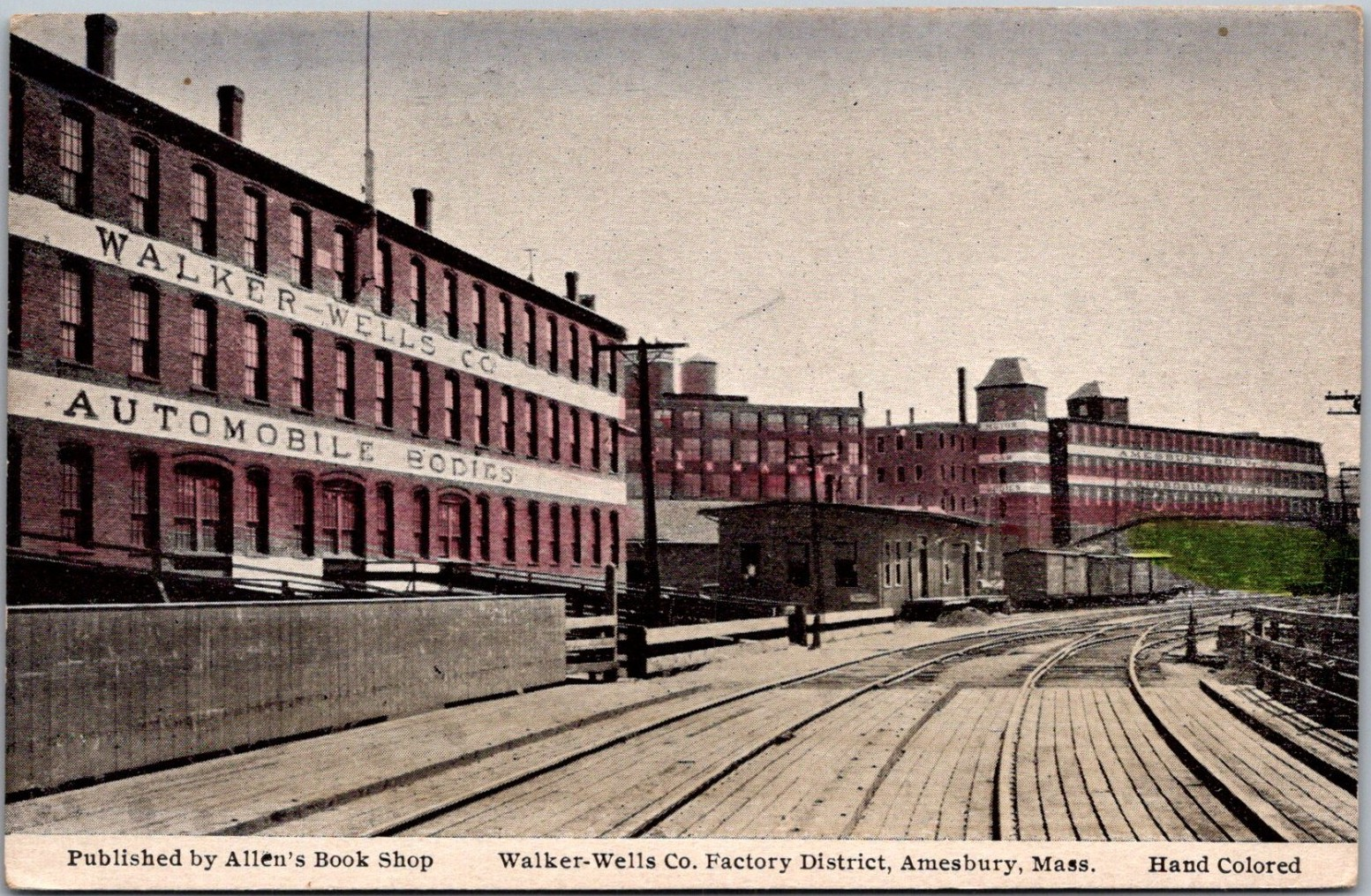
- 1910s postcard showing a railroad bridge over the Back River

- Location within Massachusetts Location within the United States

Location
- Country: United States
- States: New Hampshire, Massachusetts
- Counties: Rockingham, NH, Essex, MA
- Towns: Kensington, NH, South Hampton, NH, Amesbury, MA

Physical characteristics
- Source
  - location: Kensington, Rockingham County, New Hampshire
  - coordinates: 42°54′26″N 70°57′57″W
  - elevation: 150 ft (46 m)
- Mouth: Powwow River
  - location: Amesbury, Essex County, Massachusetts
  - coordinates: 42°51′20″N 70°55′38″W
  - elevation: 0 ft (0 m)
- Length: 6.5 mi (10.5 km)

Basin features
- Tributaries
  - left: Lucy Brook

The Back River is a 6.5-mile-long (10.5 km) river located in New Hampshire and Massachusetts in the United States. It is a tributary to the Powwow River, part of the Merrimack River watershed. Approximately 3.0 miles (4.8 km) of the river are in New Hampshire, with the remaining 3.5 miles (5.6 km) in Massachusetts.

Prior to European settlement in the early 17th century, Native Americans of the Pennacook tribe lived in the area, and used both the Back River and parent Powwow River for transportation and fishing. The native population was essentially destroyed by the 1617-19 epidemic in the area.

In the 1950s, the Clarks Pond Dam was built in Amesbury, Massachusetts, creating the pond of that name. Since the pond's creation, it has been degraded by residential building in the area, and was considered "threatened" in a 2013 report, by residential run-off and silt deposits.

The Back River rises in Kensington, New Hampshire, and flows southeast, almost immediately entering the town of South Hampton. The river turns south and enters Massachusetts in Amesbury, joining the Powwow River at tidewater just downstream from the city's center at the falls of the Powwow.

== See also ==
- List of rivers of Massachusetts
- List of rivers of New Hampshire
