= Cranberry River (Massachusetts) =

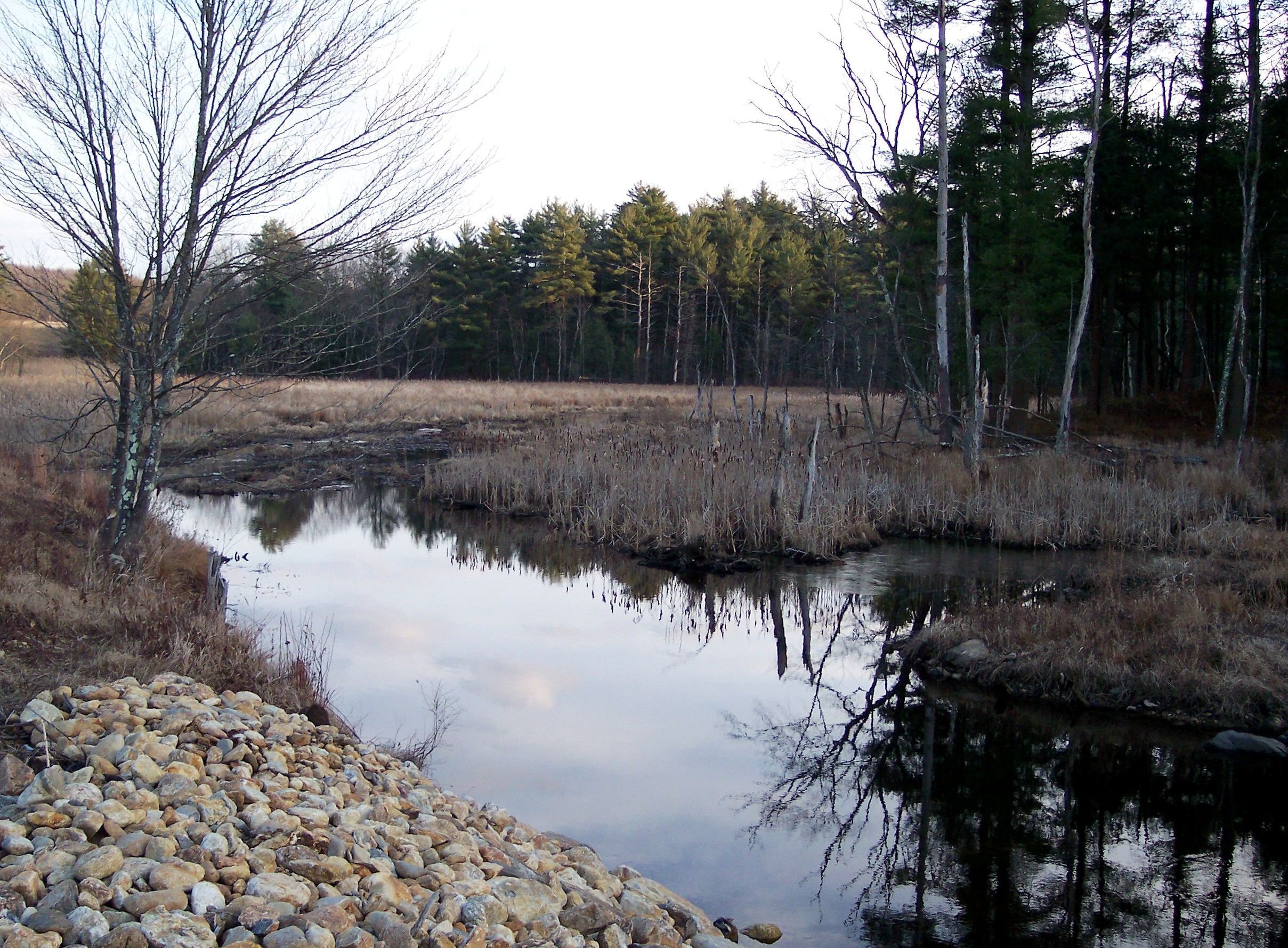
- Cranberry River in South Spencer, Massachusetts

Physical characteristics
- Source
  - location: Cranberry Meadow Pond Spencer, Massachusetts
  - coordinates: 42.190°N 72.001°W
  - elevation: 755 feet (230 m)
- Mouth
  - location: Seven Mile River
  - coordinates: 42.2293°N 72.0170°W
  - elevation: 630 feet (190 m)
- Length: 3.7 mi (6.0 km)
- Basin size: 12 mi^{2} (31 km^{2})

The Cranberry River is a river in central Massachusetts that is part of the Chicopee River Watershed. It rises in Cranberry Meadow Pond in Spencer, Massachusetts, and flows northward for 3.7 miles (6.0 km) to its confluence with the Sevenmile River southwest of Spencer.

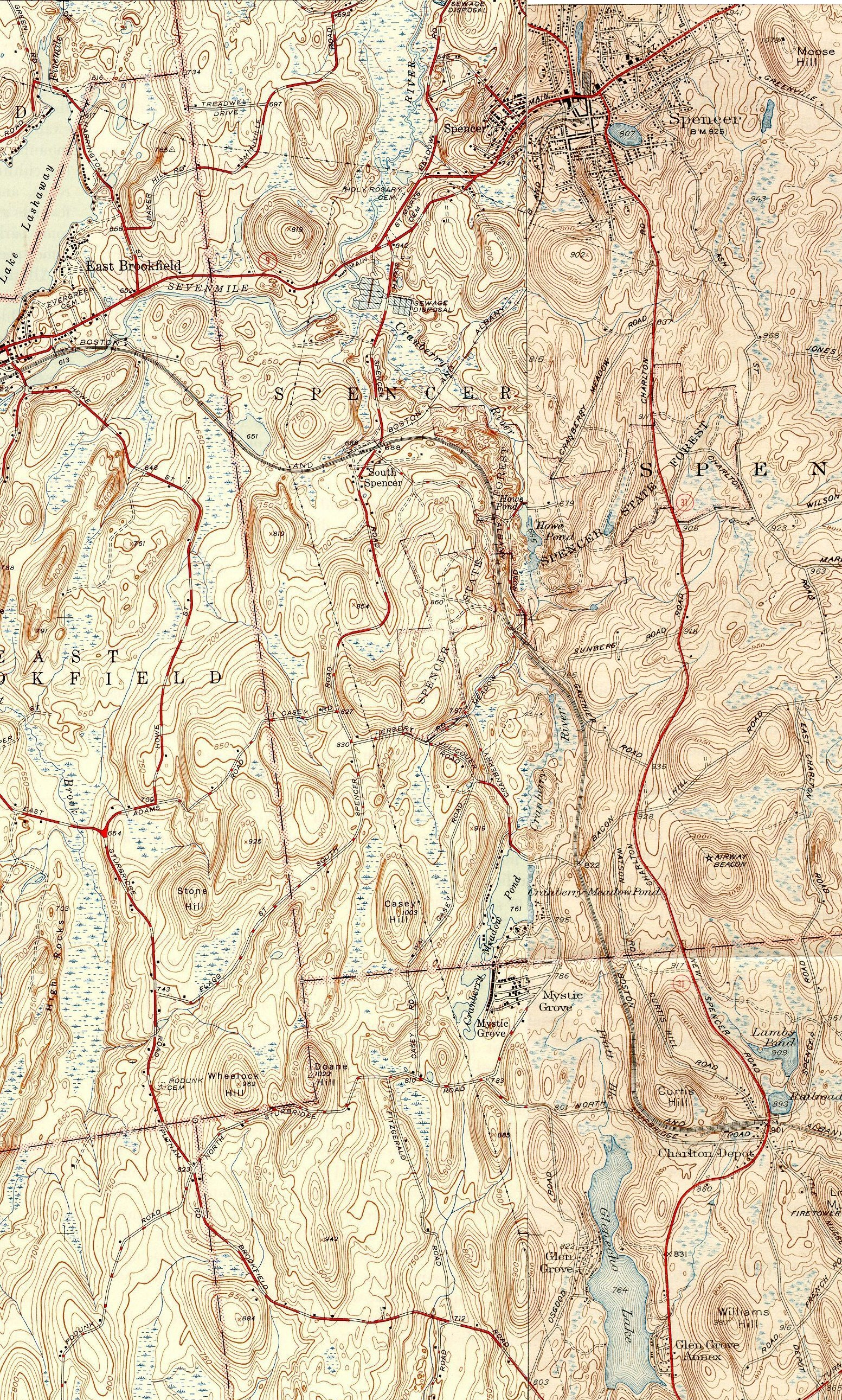
Cranberry River and environs

== See also ==
- List of rivers of Massachusetts
