= Whitman River =

River in the U.S. state of Massachusetts

Coordinates: 42°34′26″N 71°50′12″W

The Whitman River is an 8.4-mile-long (13.5 km) river in Massachusetts that flows through Ashburnham, Westminster and Fitchburg. It arises from Lake Wampanoag in Ashburnham, travels through a couple of ponds in Westminster, and ultimately joins Phillips Brook in Fitchburg to form the North Nashua River, a principal tributary of the Nashua River.

== See also ==
- List of rivers of Massachusetts
