= South Nashua River =

River in the U.S. state of Massachusetts

Coordinates: 42°26′50″N 71°40′10″W

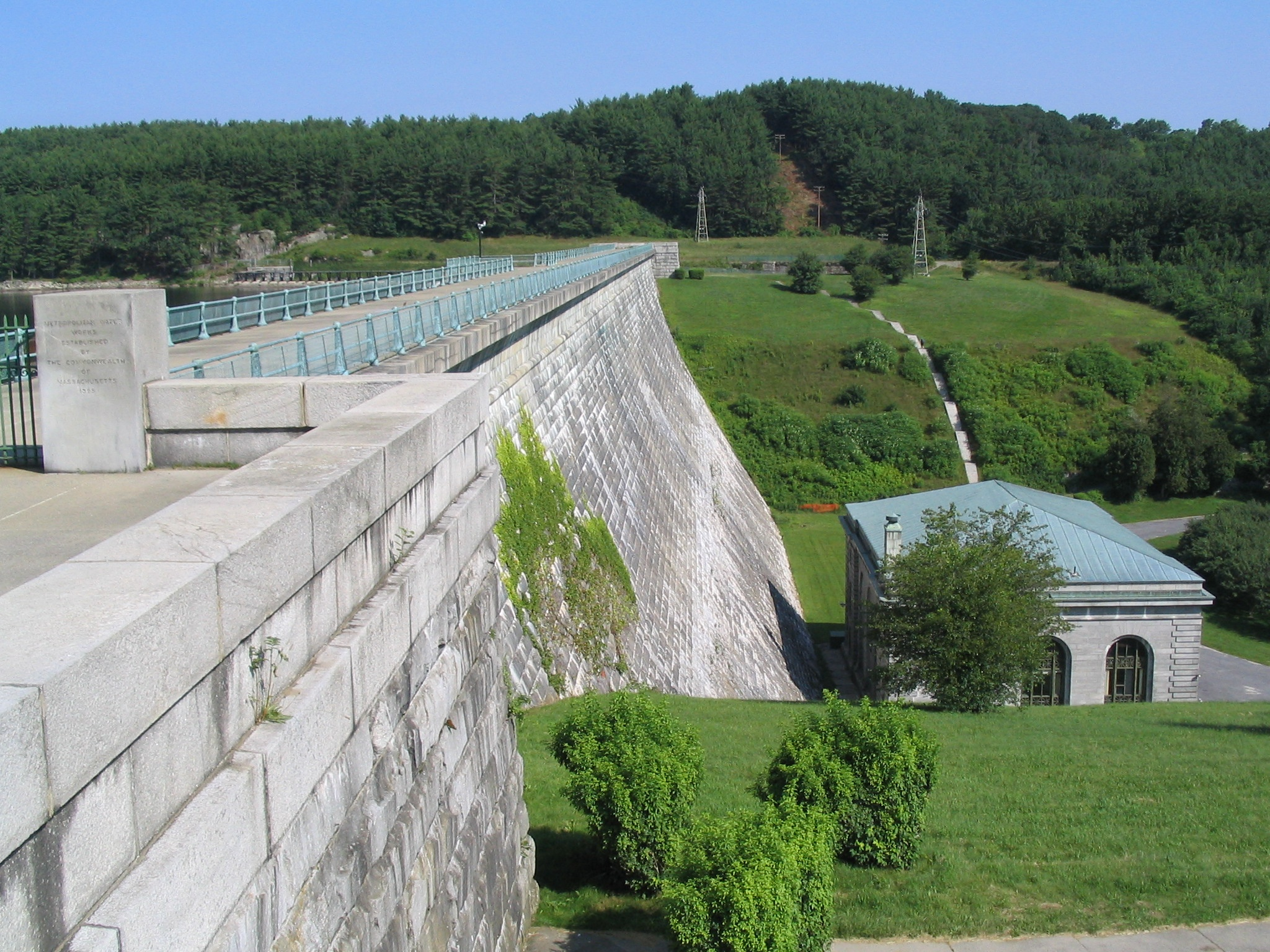
The source of the South Nashua River, The Wachusett Dam.

The South Nashua River is a river in Massachusetts that flows 5.1 miles (8.2 km) through Clinton and Lancaster. It starts at the Wachusett Dam on the Wachusett Reservoir and ends by joining the North Nashua River to form the Nashua River.

== See also ==
- Rivers of Massachusetts
