= Salisbury Plain River =

River in Massachusetts, United States

Coordinates: 42°4′41.9″N 71°0′33.8″W

The Salisbury Plain River is a 4.7-mile-long (7.6 km) river in Plymouth County, Massachusetts that flows from the city of Brockton into the towns of West Bridgewater and East Bridgewater where it joins the Matfield River, a major tributary of the Taunton River.

The Salisbury Plain River flows through the heart of Brockton, Massachusetts, once a major shoe manufacturing center. The river is formed by several smaller streams, including Trout Brook, Cary Brook, and Salisbury Brook.

== See also ==
- Taunton River Watershed
