= Phillips Brook (Massachusetts) =

River in the United States of America

Coordinates: 42°34′27″N 71°50′13″W

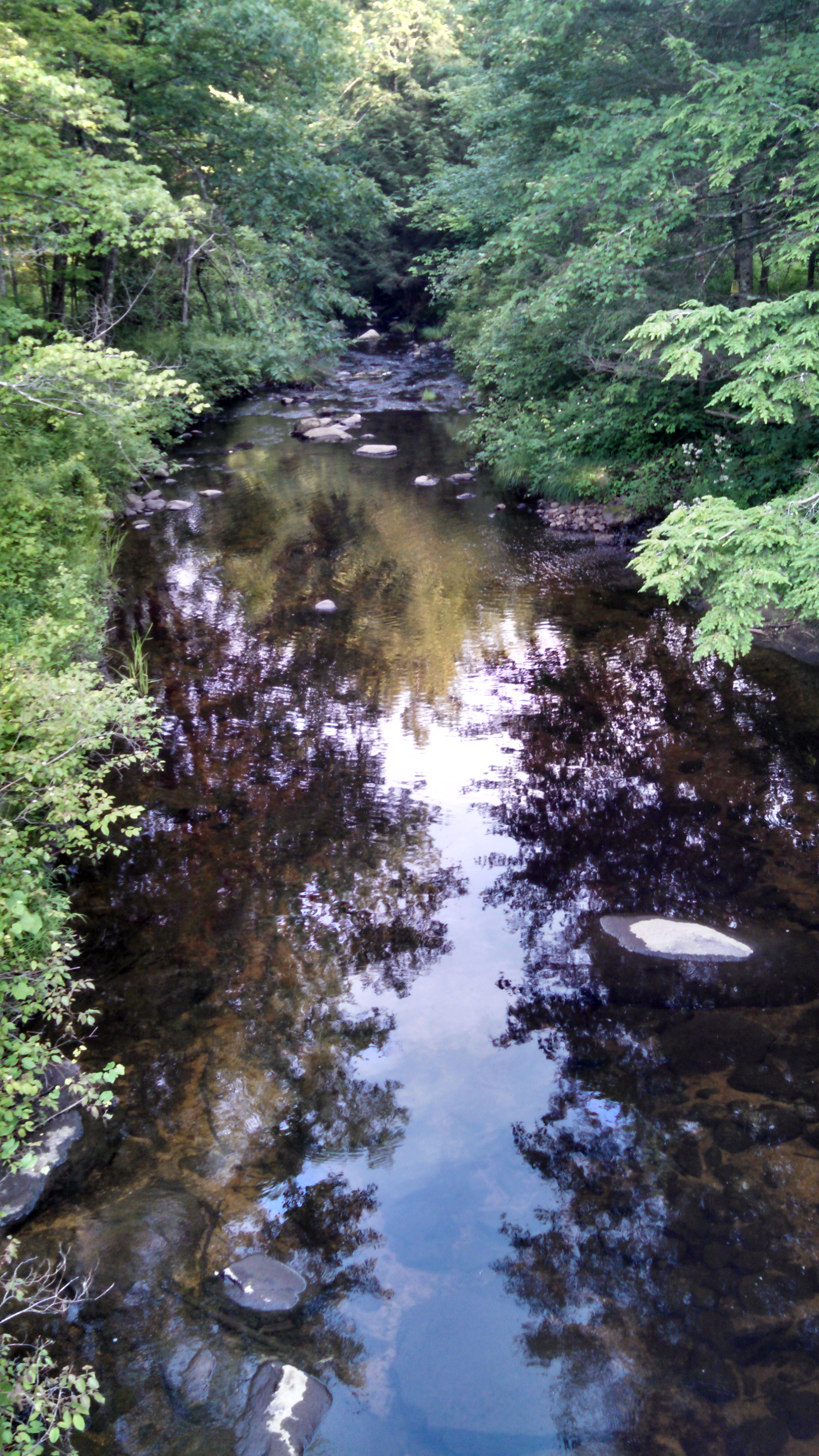
Phillips Brook in Westminster

Phillips Brook is an 8-mile-long (13 km) river in Massachusetts. The river rises from Winnekeag Lake in Ashburnham, flows through Westminster, and meets the Whitman River in Fitchburg to form the North Nashua River.

== See also ==
- Rivers of Massachusetts
