= Little River (Merrimack River tributary) =

- Location within Massachusetts Location within New Hampshire Location within the United States

Location
- Country: United States
- States: New Hampshire, Massachusetts
- Counties: Rockingham, NH, Essex, MA
- Towns: Kingston, NH, Plaistow, NH, Haverhill, MA

Physical characteristics
- Source
  - location: Kingston, NH
  - coordinates: 42°52′37″N 71°5′20″W
  - elevation: 130 ft (40 m)
- Mouth: Merrimack River
  - location: Haverhill, MA
  - coordinates: 42°46′21″N 71°4′58″W
  - elevation: 0 ft (0 m)
- Length: 12.9 mi (20.8 km)

Basin features
- Tributaries
  - left: Seaver Brook, Snows Brook
  - right: Kelly Brook, Bryant Brook, Foote Brook, Fishin Brook

The Little River is a 12.9-mile-long (20.8 km) river in New Hampshire and Massachusetts in the United States. It is a tributary of the Merrimack River, part of the Gulf of Maine watershed.

The Little River rises in Kingston, New Hampshire, flows south through Plaistow, and enters the city of Haverhill, Massachusetts, where it joins the Merrimack River. Most of the Little River's course is marked by suburban and urban development.

== See also ==
- List of rivers of Massachusetts
- List of rivers of New Hampshire
