= Long Pond (West Yarmouth, Massachusetts) =

- Location of Long Pond within Massachusetts
- Location: Barnstable County, Massachusetts
- Coordinates: 41°40′11″N 70°11′50″W
- Type: lake
- Primary outflows: Parkers River
- Basin countries: United States
- Surface elevation: 7 feet (2.1 m)
- Settlements: South Yarmouth

Long Pond is a lake in Barnstable County, Massachusetts. It is located in South Yarmouth.
