= Artichoke River (Massachusetts) =

Coordinates: 42°49′12″N 70°56′19″W

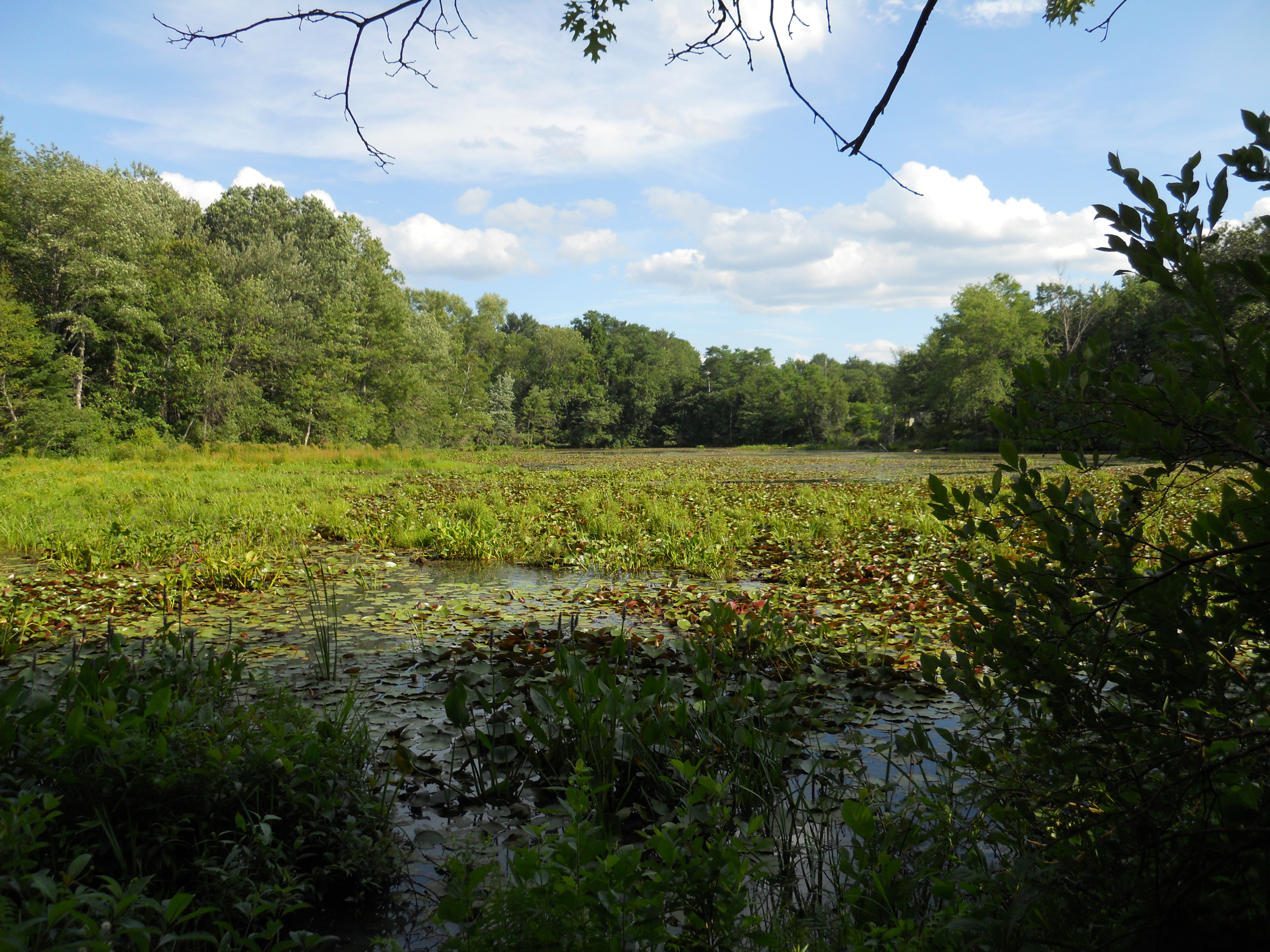
- Lower Artichoke River

- Location of mouth in Massachusetts

Location
- Country: US

Physical characteristics
- Source
  - location: West Newbury, Massachusetts
  - elevation: 20 feet (6 m) at West Newbury, Massachusetts
- Mouth
  - location: Merrimack River
- Length: 1.2 miles (2 km)
- Basin size: 3.5 square miles (9.1 km^{2})

The Artichoke River (1.2 miles (1.9 km)long), is a tributary of the Merrimack River in Massachusetts in the United States. It is in Essex County, Massachusetts, and flows generally north, marking the boundary between West Newbury and Newburyport. The Upper and Lower Artichoke reservoirs are impoundments of the river that acts as a water source for nearby towns. Despite the short length of the river, there are three dams along its course, the Emory Lane Dam, the Lower Artichoke Dam and the Upper Artichoke Dam. The river is named for the Jerusalem Artichoke, which had been harvested nearby by Native Americans and early settlers.

== See also ==
- List of rivers of Massachusetts
