= Burnshirt River =

River in the U.S. state of Massachusetts

Coordinates: 42.5333°N 72.0833°W

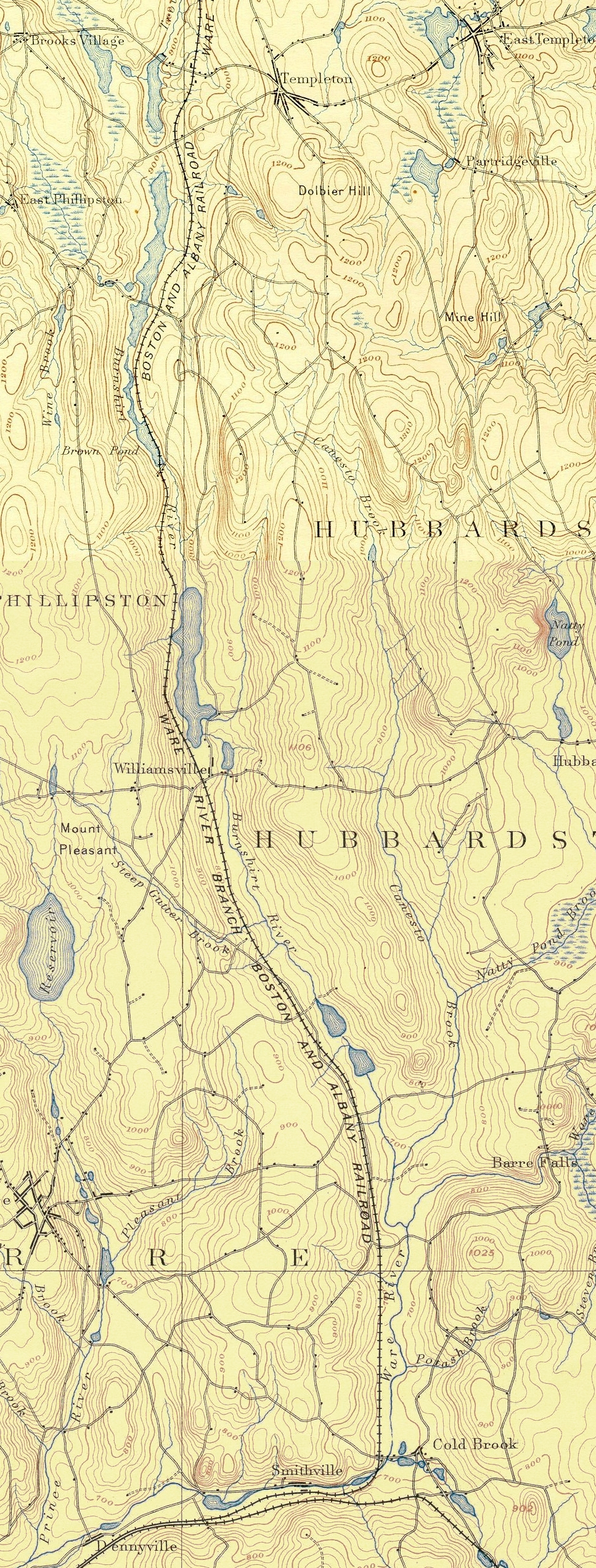
Burnshirt River

The Burnshirt River is a 12.9-mile-long (20.8 km) stream in Worcester County, Massachusetts. It is a tributary of the Ware River, draining ultimately into the Connecticut River and thence the Long Island Sound.

The river rises about one mile southwest of Templeton, Massachusetts at an elevation of 653 feet (199 m) above sea level. From there it flows through forest and marshes south to Williamsville, then southeast to join the Ware River about two miles east of Barre. It is stocked with trout for fishing.

For much of its length, the river is paralleled by the former Ware River Railroad, now the Ware River Rail Trail.

== See also ==
- List of rivers of Massachusetts
