= Roger Island River =

Tidal estuary in the U.S. state of Massachusetts

Coordinates: 42.722°N 70.819°W

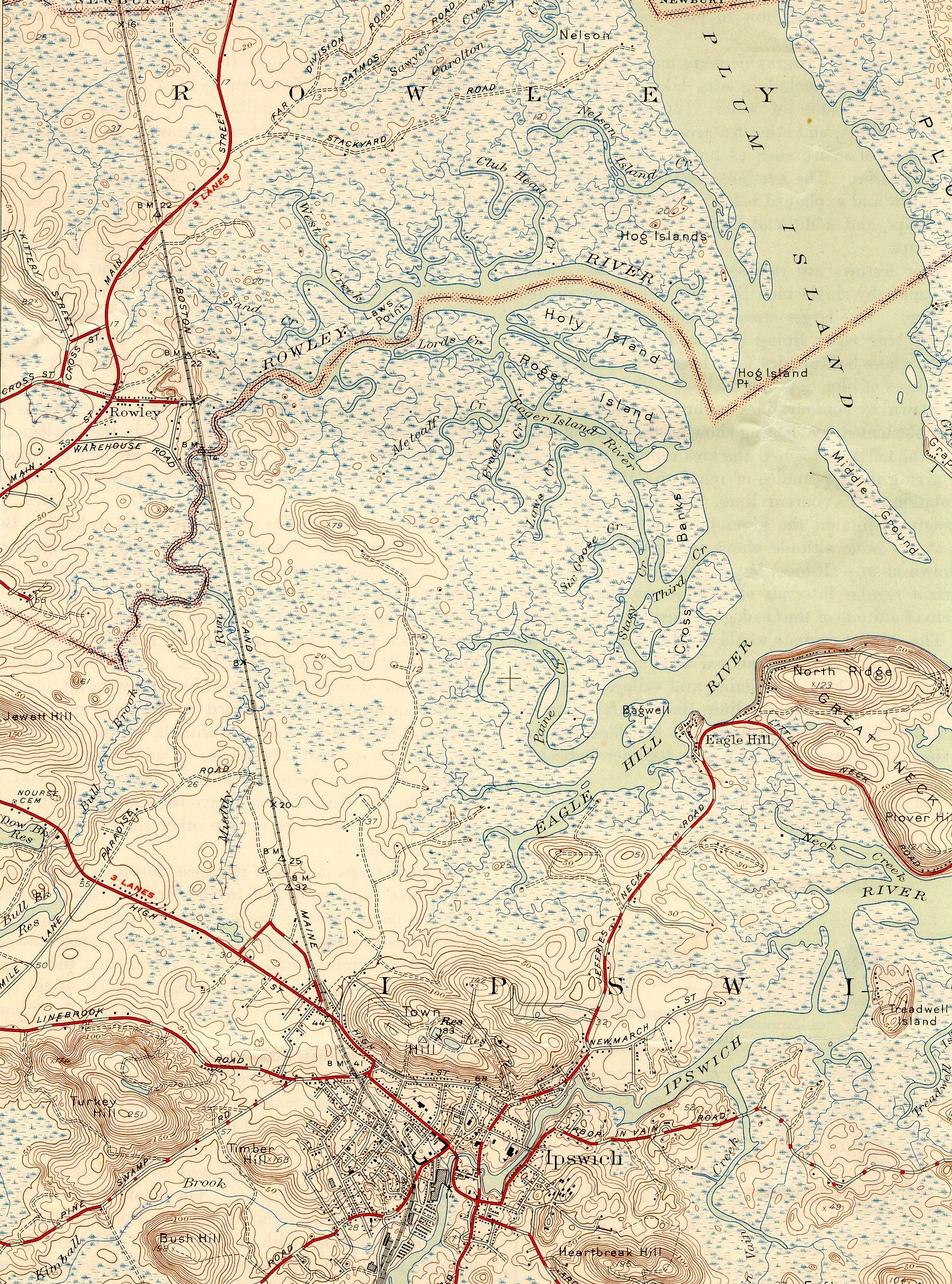
Roger Island River

The Roger Island River is a small tidal estuary between Ipswich and Rowley, Massachusetts. It is a southern branch of the larger Rowley River passing around Roger Island.

Roger Island River is navigable for small craft, and home to bass, shad, and alewives. Its banks are lined with tidal salt marshes and abound in clams. Today the river is popular for kayaking.
