= North River (Deerfield River tributary) =

River in the U.S. state of Massachusetts

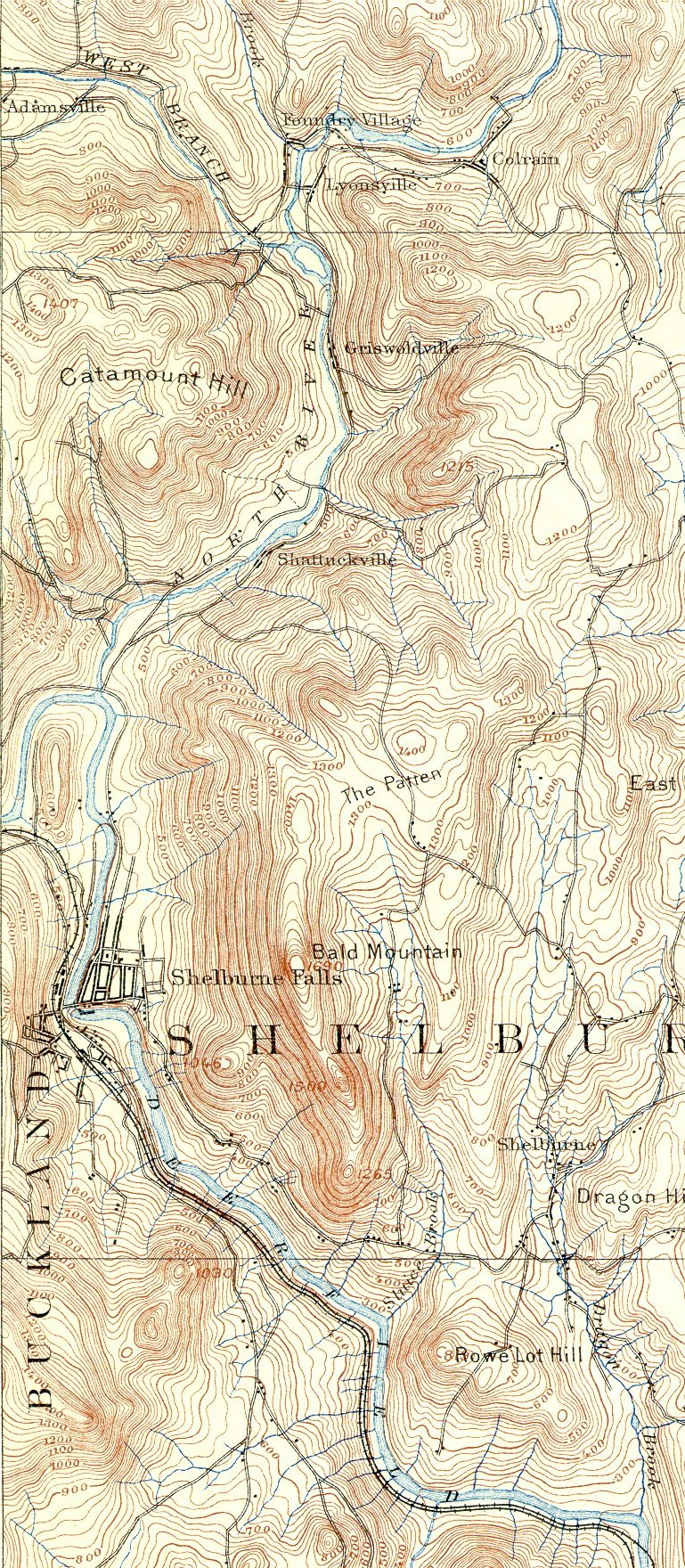
North River

The North River is a 3.4-mile-long (5.5 km) river located in western Massachusetts, in the United States.

It is formed by the confluence of the 7.1-mile-long (11.4 km) West Branch and the 17.5-mile-long (28.2 km) East Branch of the North River. Both branches converge in the town of Colrain, Massachusetts. The river is a tributary of the Deerfield River, joining it just north of the village of Shelburne Falls.

== See also ==
- List of rivers of Massachusetts
