= Walker Brook (Massachusetts) =

Freshwater stream in Chester, Massachusetts

Coordinates: 42°16′41″N 72°58′47″W

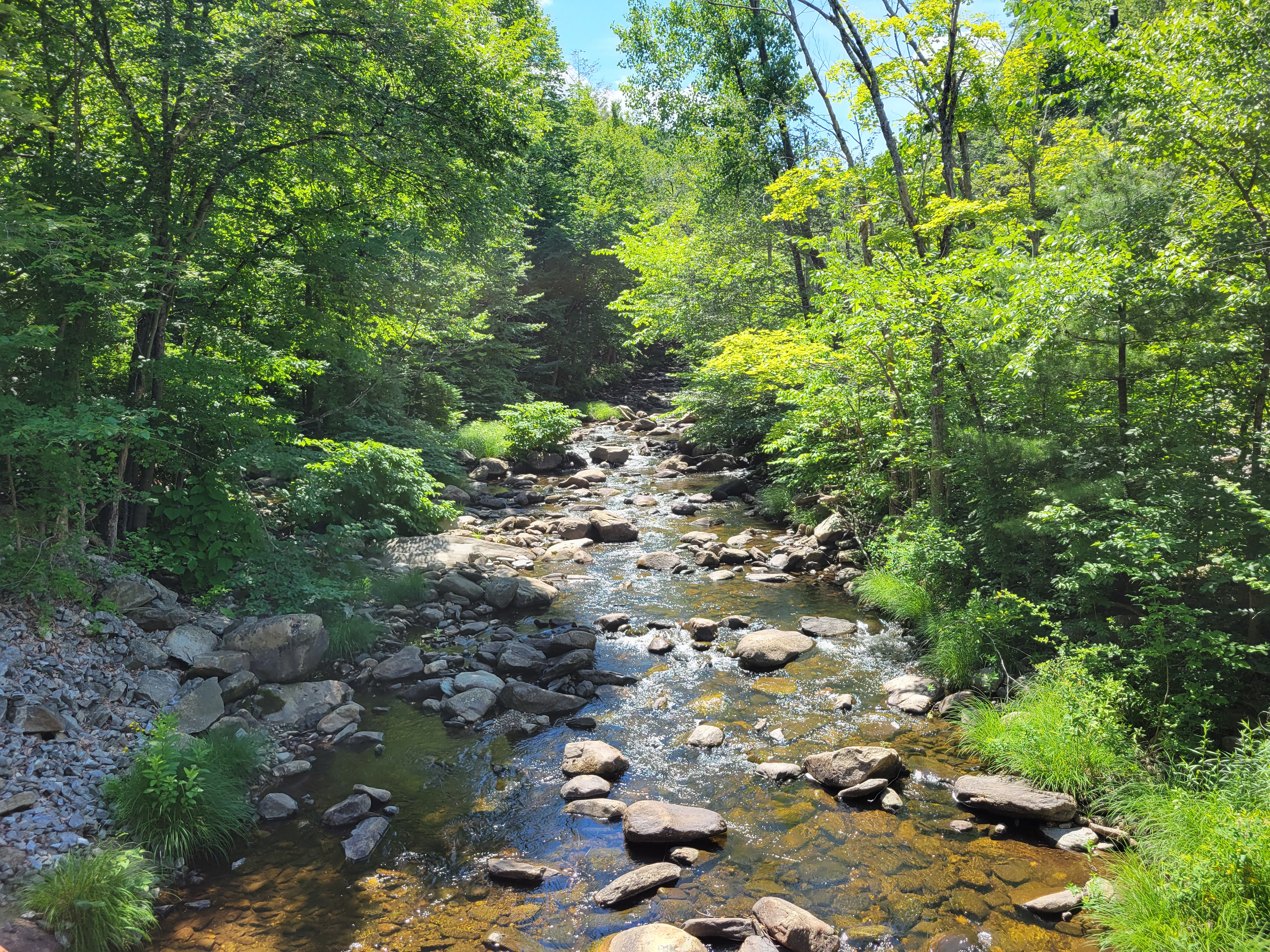
Walker Brook at Blandford Road in Chester

Walker Brook is a brook in Hampden County, Massachusetts, in the United States. The brook collects runoff from the Berkshires and empties into the West Branch of the Westfield River in the town of Chester. The brook runs through a couple of campgrounds, such as Walker Island Campground, just outside of Chester, and Bonny Rigg Campground in Becket.

== See also ==
- List of rivers in Massachusetts
