= Crooked River (Massachusetts) =

River in Massachusetts, United States

Crooked River, Wareham, Massachusetts, at night

The Crooked River is a small tributary of the Wareham River located entirely within the town of Wareham, Massachusetts, United States. Its source is found in salt marshes and cranberry bogs east of Indian Neck Road, and its mouth empties into the Wareham River opposite Swifts Neck. In all, its length is just over one mile.

== Flora and fauna ==
Fish from Buzzards Bay swim up the Wareham River and into the Crooked River, although the upper half of the Crooked River goes down to bare mud at extreme low tide. The river is home to a number of birds that feed on the fish, including the kingfisher and the great blue heron. In winter it is home to ducks, Canada geese and occasional swans.

Oyster reefs are scattered over the river bottom, and marsh grass lines its banks.

=== Human habitation ===
Small single-family wood-frame homes line much of the river, some of them with private docks and boats ranging from small rowboats to 34-foot yachts.

== See also ==
- List of Massachusetts rivers
