= Tiasquam River =

Stream on Martha's Vineyard in the U.S. state of Massachusetts

Tiasquam River, 2008

The Tiasquam River is a 3.7-mile-long (6.0 km) stream on the southwest of Martha's Vineyard, Massachusetts.

The creek arises in the eastern section of Chilmark, and flows generally east, then south, into West Tisbury, Massachusetts to feed the Tisbury Great Pond, which in turn empties into the Atlantic Ocean from the island's southern shore.
