= Stop River =

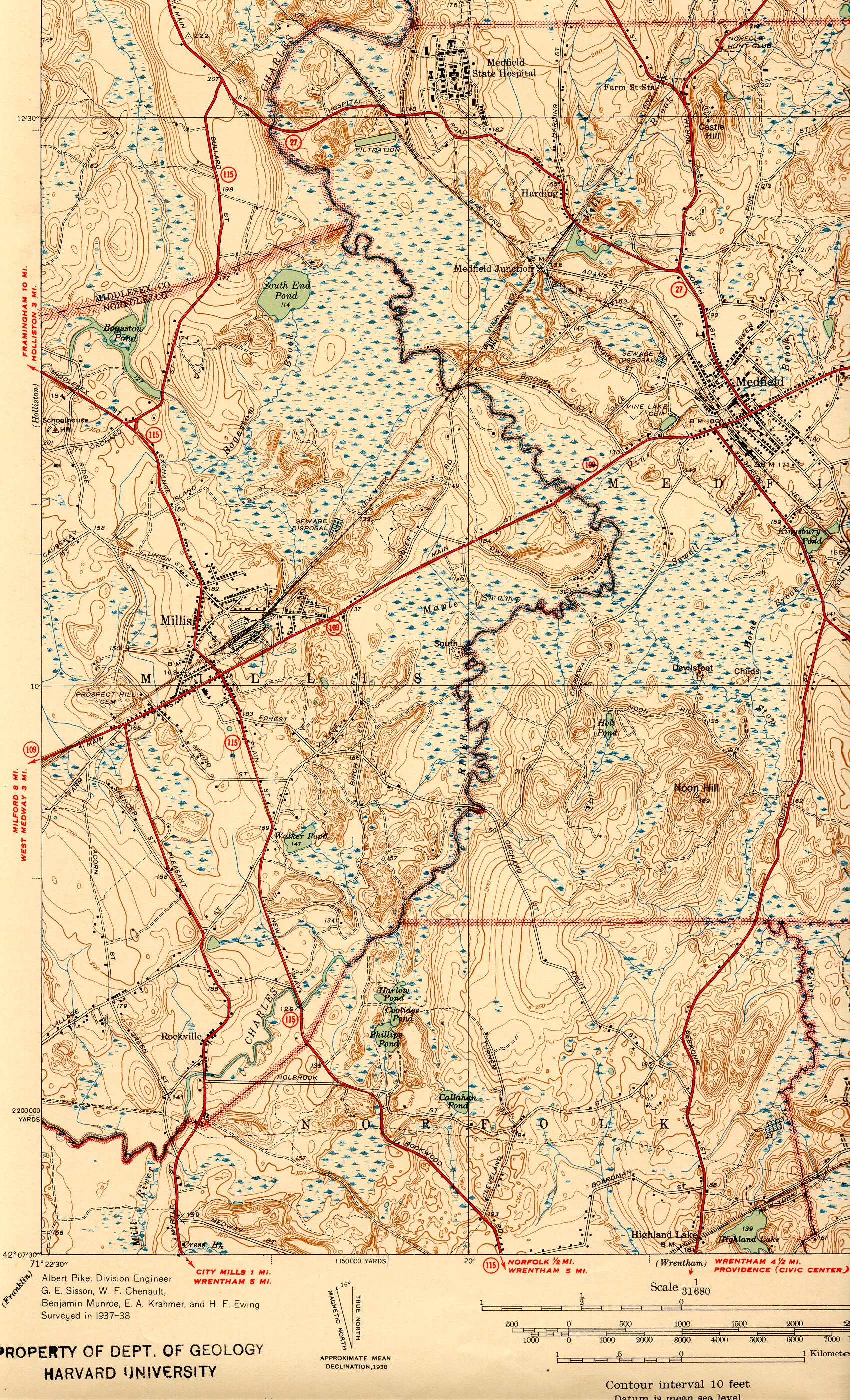
- Stop River and environs

Physical characteristics
- Source
  - location: Highland Lake, Norfolk, MA
  - coordinates: 42°07′35″N 71°18′20″W
- Mouth
  - location: Charles River, Medfield, MA
  - coordinates: 42°10′25.2″N 71°19′08.4″W
- Length: 9.3 mi (15.0 km)

The Stop River is a low and marshy stream in Medfield, Massachusetts, and partly forming the border between Norfolk and Walpole. The river rises near Highland Lake in Norfolk, flows 9.3 miles (15.0 km) northwards to join the Charles River in Medfield, and ultimately drains into Boston Harbor.

The Medfield Rhododendrons reservation, operated by The Trustees of Reservations, is an important and rare stand of Rhododendron maximum along the river in Woodridge Street, Medfield.
