= Hockomock River =

Stream in Massachusetts, United States

The Hockomock River is a 3.6-mile-long (5.8 km) stream in West Bridgewater, Massachusetts. It is a tributary of the Town River.

Hockomock is said to mean "Place where Spirits Dwell" in the Wampanoag language. The river arises in the Hockomock Swamp, and flows south to its confluence with the Town River, which eventually joins the Taunton River to empty into Mount Hope Bay.
