= Little Pamet River =

River in Massachusetts, United States

Coordinates: 41°59′32.39″N 70°4′25.76″W

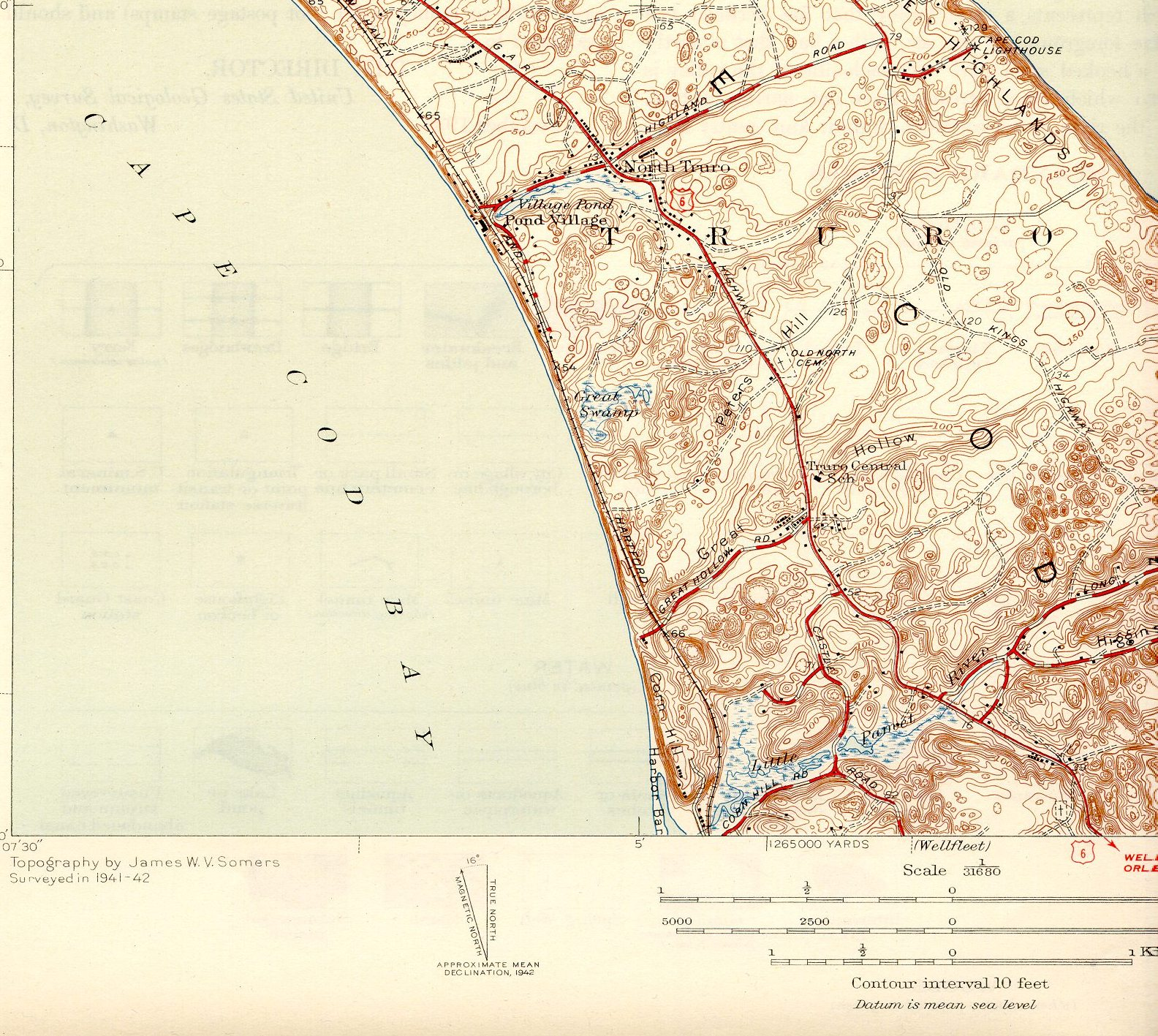
Little Pamet River

The Little Pamet River is a 1.5-mile-long (2.4 km) river in Truro, Massachusetts on Cape Cod.

The river arises in wetlands, flows west for about one mile, and drains into Cape Cod Bay. The nearby Pamet River lies a few miles to the south.
