= Parkers River =

Location
- Country: United States
- State: Massachusetts

Physical characteristics
- Source: Long Pond
  - location: NW of West Yarmouth
  - coordinates: 41.6736111°N 70.1872222°W
  - elevation: 33 ft (10 m)
- Mouth: Atlantic Ocean
  - location: SE of West Yarmouth
  - coordinates: 41°38′13″N 70°13′17″W
  - elevation: 0 ft (0 m)

Parkers River is a river in Barnstable County, Massachusetts. It drains out of Long Pond in West Yarmouth, flows through Seine Pond, and empties into the Nantucket Sound southeast of West Yarmouth. Named for Isaiah Parker who lived on the west bank of the river.
