= Fort River =

Tributary of the Connecticut River, located in Western Massachusetts

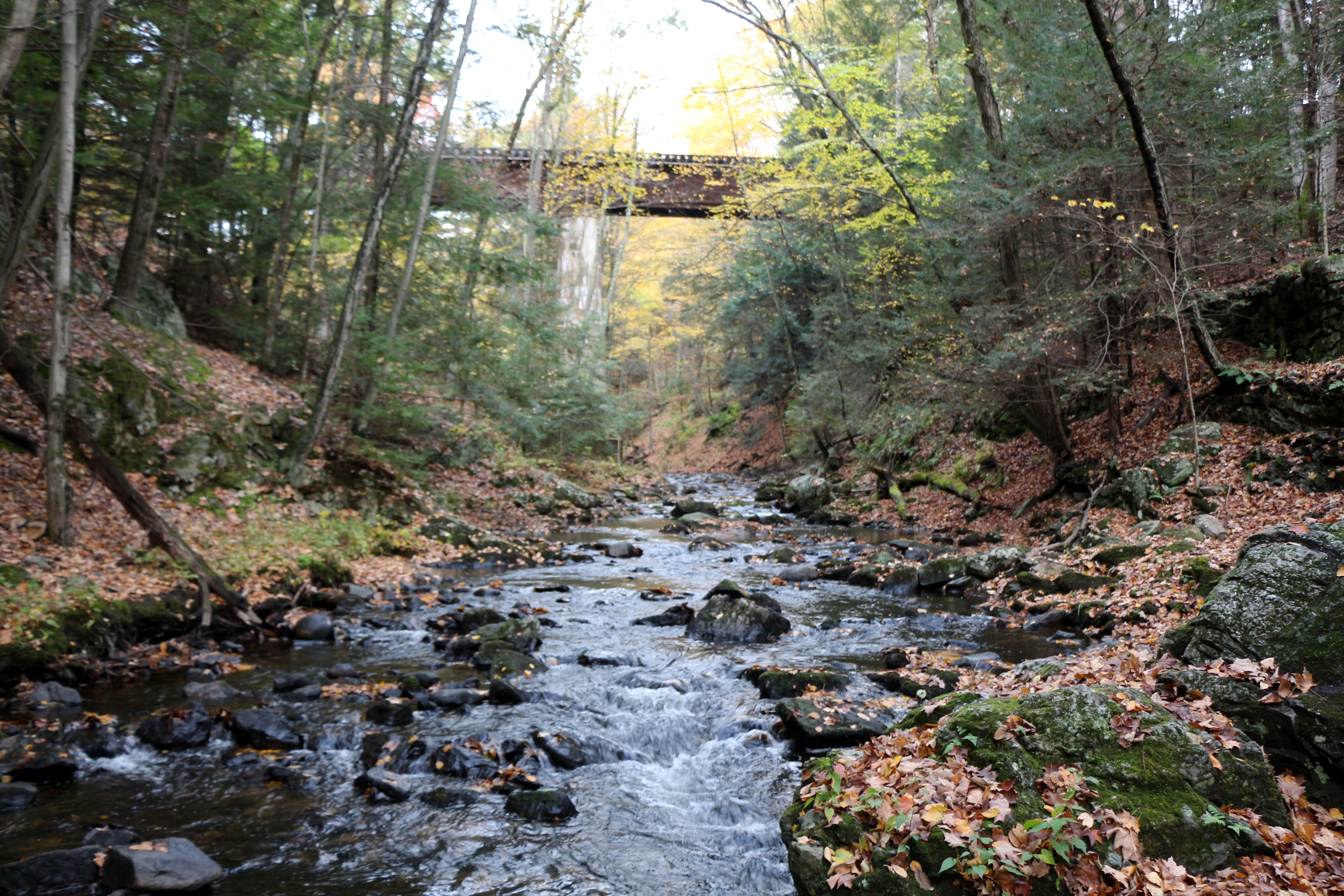
- Fort River in Amherst

- Location of the mouth of the Fort River within Massachusetts

Location
- Country: United States
- State: Massachusetts
- County: Hampshire

Physical characteristics
- Source: Fort River at Adams Brook (location where Amythest Brook flows into Adams Brook)
  - location: Pelham, Massachusetts
- Mouth
  - location: Hadley, Massachusetts
  - coordinates: 42.3261°N 72.5843°W

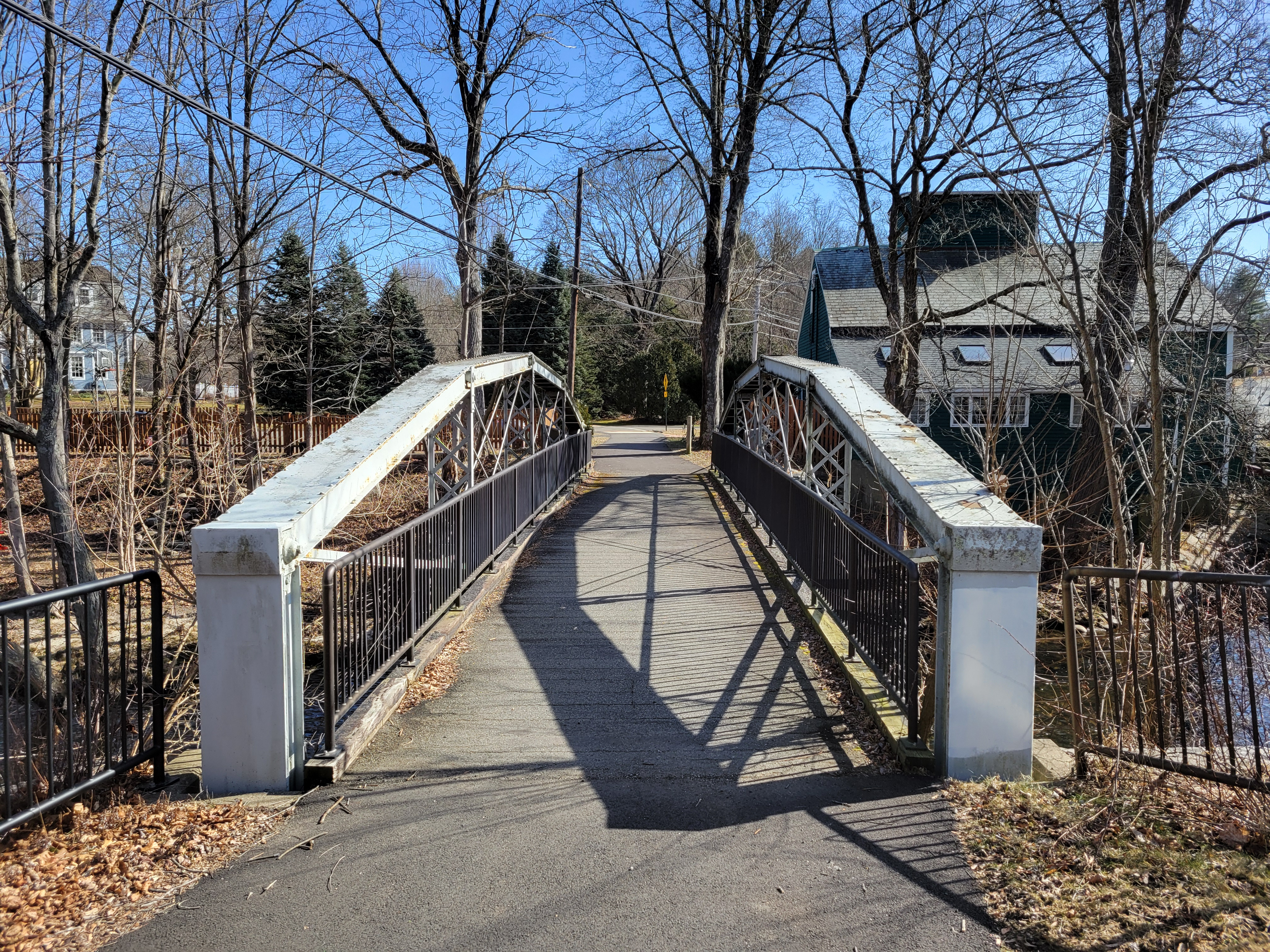
Fort River Lenticular Bridge in Amherst

The Fort River is a river in Western Massachusetts and is a tributary of the Connecticut River and runs through the towns of, Amherst, Massachusetts, and ends in Hadley, Massachusetts.

The Fort technically begins as Adams Brook which begins at a pond near Atkin's Reservoir in Shutesbury, Massachusetts (however the ponds are not part of the reservoir), and flows south-west ward until it reaches the spot where Amethyst Brook flows into it, where it becomes the "Fort River." Although it has no dams or man-made structures on the river, some of the Fort's tributaries have reservoirs.

The Fort River has a wide variety of wildlife due to it being the longest free-flowing tributary (having no dams or other man made changes made to the rivers shape or flow) of the Connecticut River, making it one of the 3 most diverse rivers in the state.
