= Bumps River =

Inlet in Massachusetts, United States

Coordinates: 41°38′4.92″N 70°21′28.07″W

The Bumps River is an inlet on Cape Cod, Massachusetts. It separates Osterville from Centerville.
