= Mitchell River (Massachusetts) =

River in the US

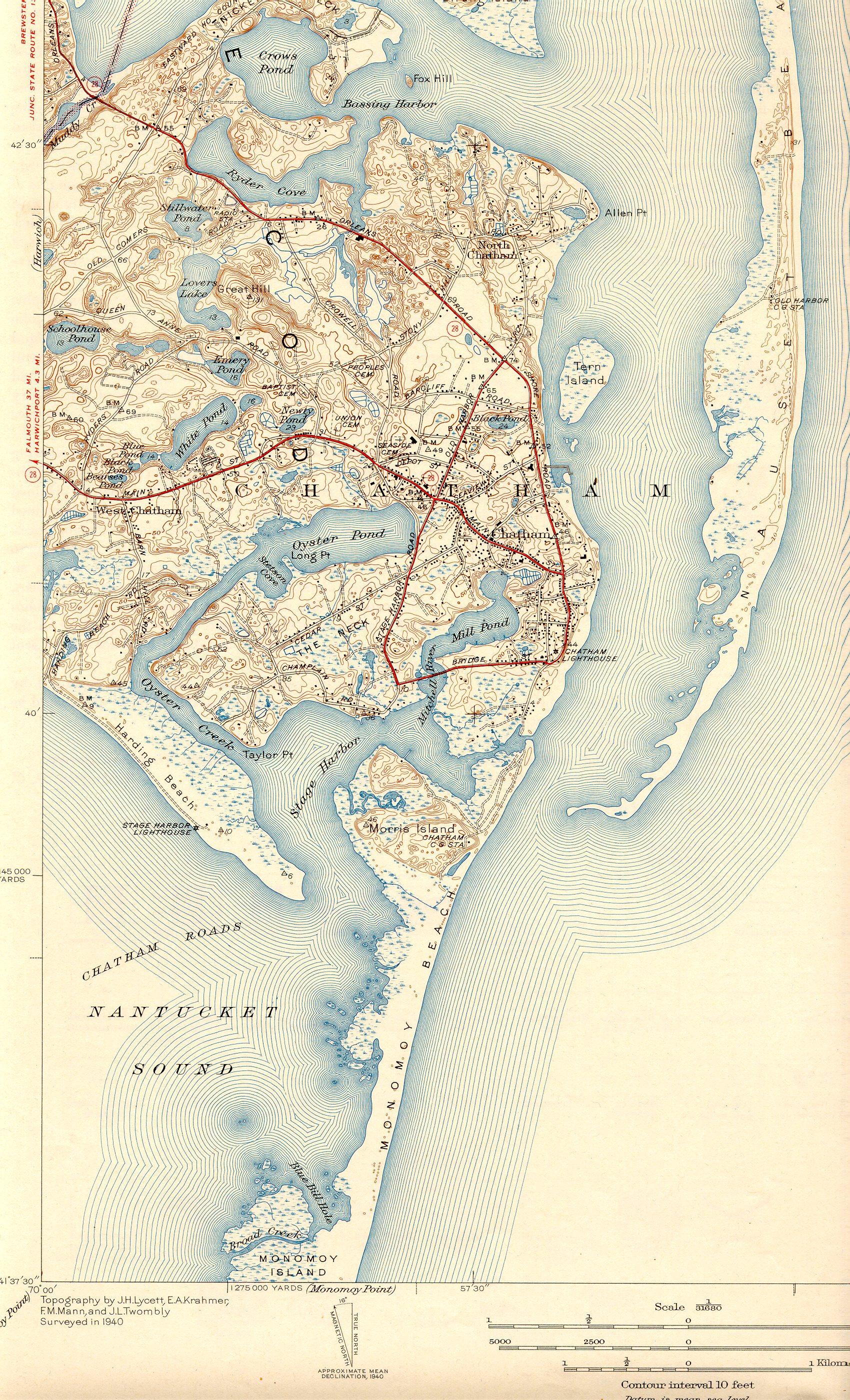
The Mitchell River and environs

The Mitchell River is a 1.5-mile-long (2.4 km) river in Chatham, Massachusetts on Cape Cod. It is an estuary connecting Mill Pond to Stage Harbor.
