= Egypt River =

Stream in Ipswich, Massachusetts, U.S.

Coordinates: 42°42′23.40″N 70°51′47.58″W

The Egypt River is a stream in Ipswich, Massachusetts, United States.

The river is formed by the confluence of Bull and Dow brooks below their reservoirs, and joins the Muddy River and then the Rowley River, which in turn empties into the Plum Island Sound. The Rowley River runs through salt marshes, in which it forms a narrow and winding inlet about 5.5 miles (8.9 km) in total length.

The name Egypt River is recorded as early as 1635. In early colonial times, it was also termed the North River. It was then a source of herring and smelt, but few have been observed since the 1970s.
