= Bungay River =

River in Massachusetts, United States

Coordinates: 41°55′41.54″N 71°17′16.62″W

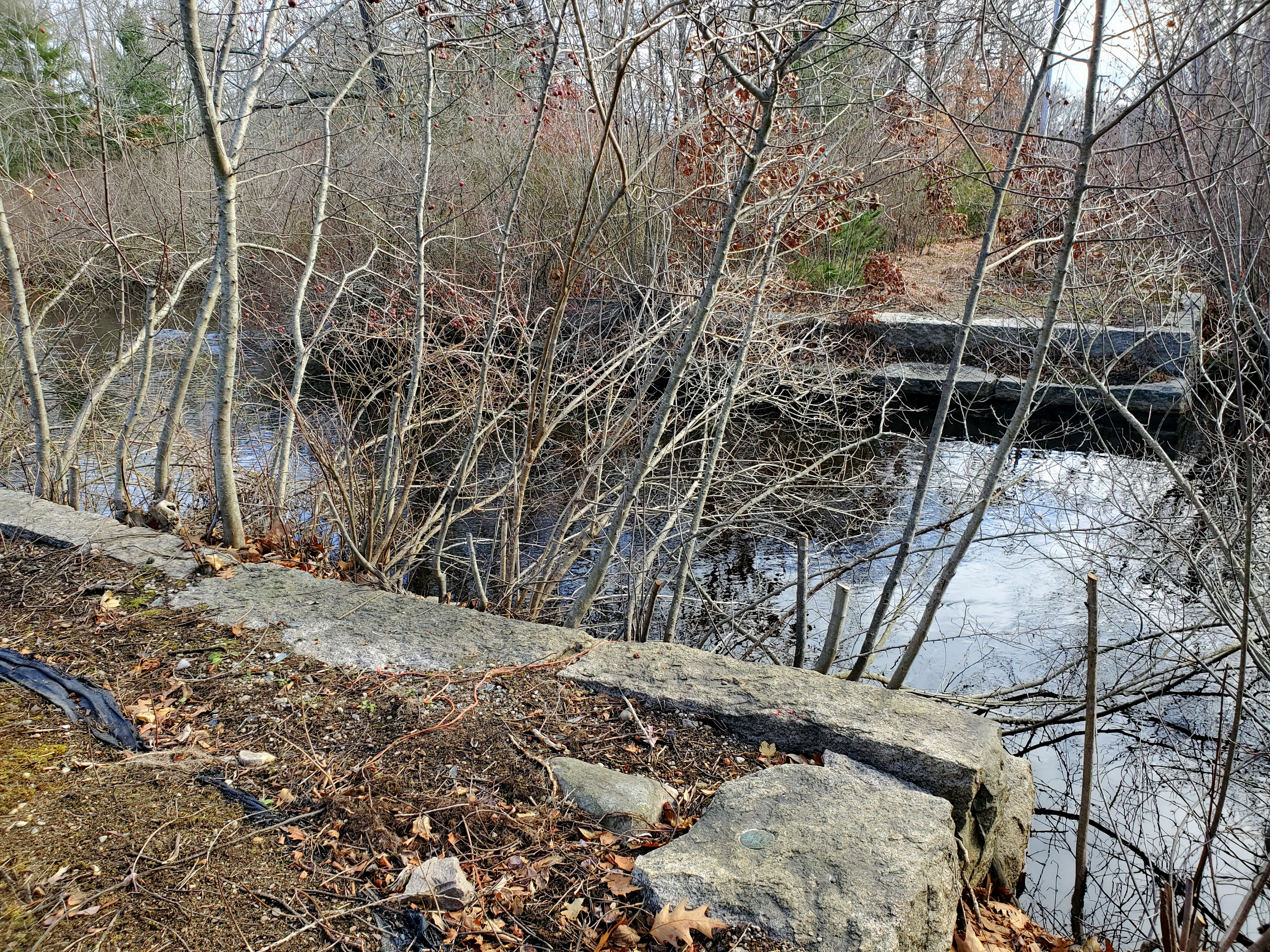
Former Attleboro Branch trolley bridge over the Bungay River in Attleboro

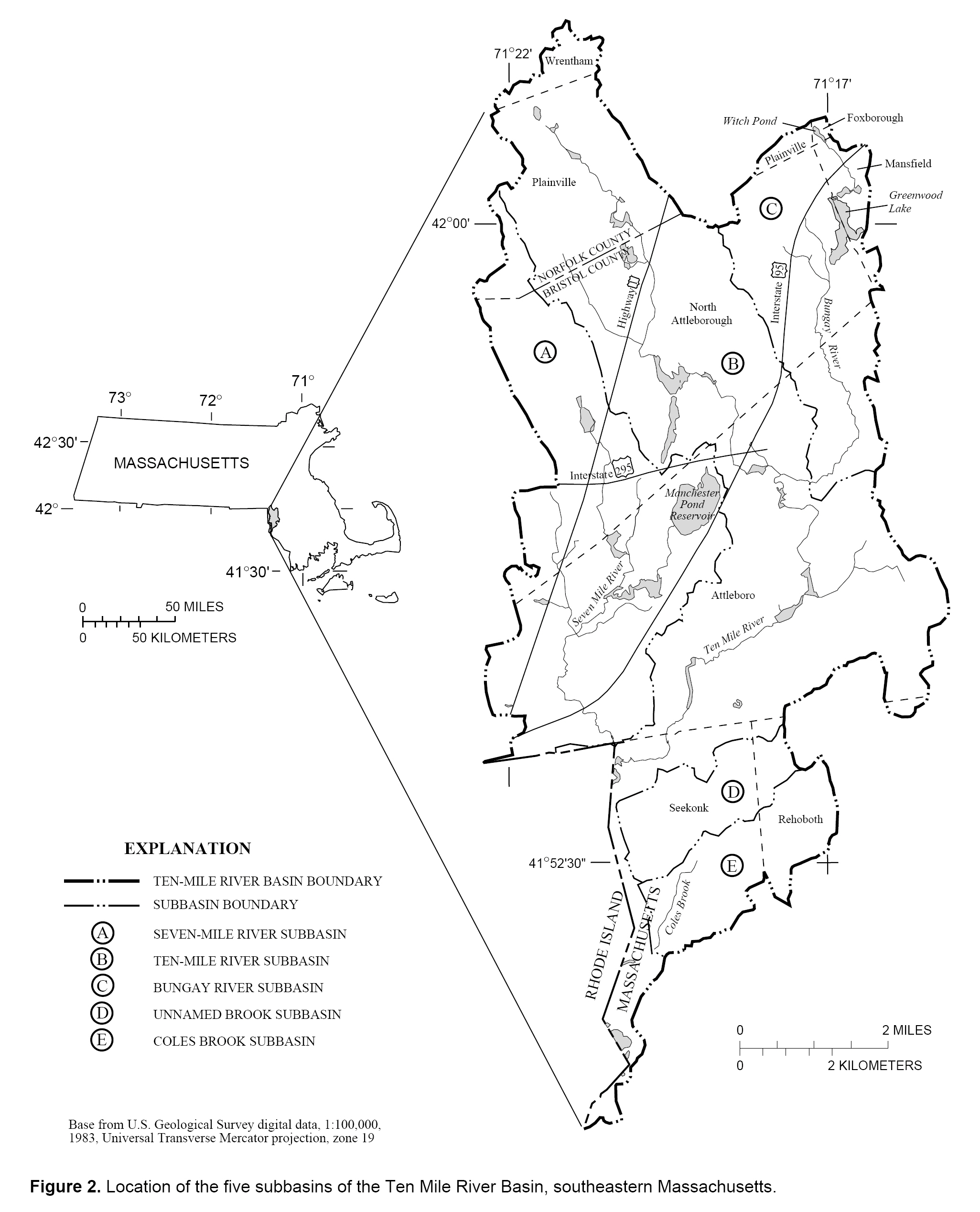
Map of the Ten Mile River watershed, including the Bungay River

The Bungay River is a short river in southeastern Massachusetts that is a tributary of the Ten Mile River.

The Bungay River begins in Witch Pond in Foxborough, Massachusetts at an altitude of about 157 feet (48 m) above sea level. It flows south through Greenwood Lake and through North Attleboro and Attleboro. It enters the Ten Mile River in Attleboro and ultimately empties into Narragansett Bay. It is 7.2 miles (11.6 km) long.

According to published judgments by the Massachusetts Executive Office of Environmental Affairs, the river flows through the best red maple swamp in Massachusetts and provides some of the best canoeing across the state. It and surrounding wetlands are under study as wildlife preservation areas.

== Tributaries ==
The West Branch and Black Brook are the only named tributaries, though there are many unnamed streams that also feed it.

== Bungay Lake ==
Bungay Lake (Greenwood Lake on federal maps) is a 110-acre (0.45 km^{2}) private lake in North Attleboro and Mansfield. It was first formed by a dam on the Bungay River in the 18th century near its confluence with the West Branch. It is classified as class A water.
