= Umpachene River =

River in Massachusetts, United States

Coordinates: 42.093577°N 73.272753°W

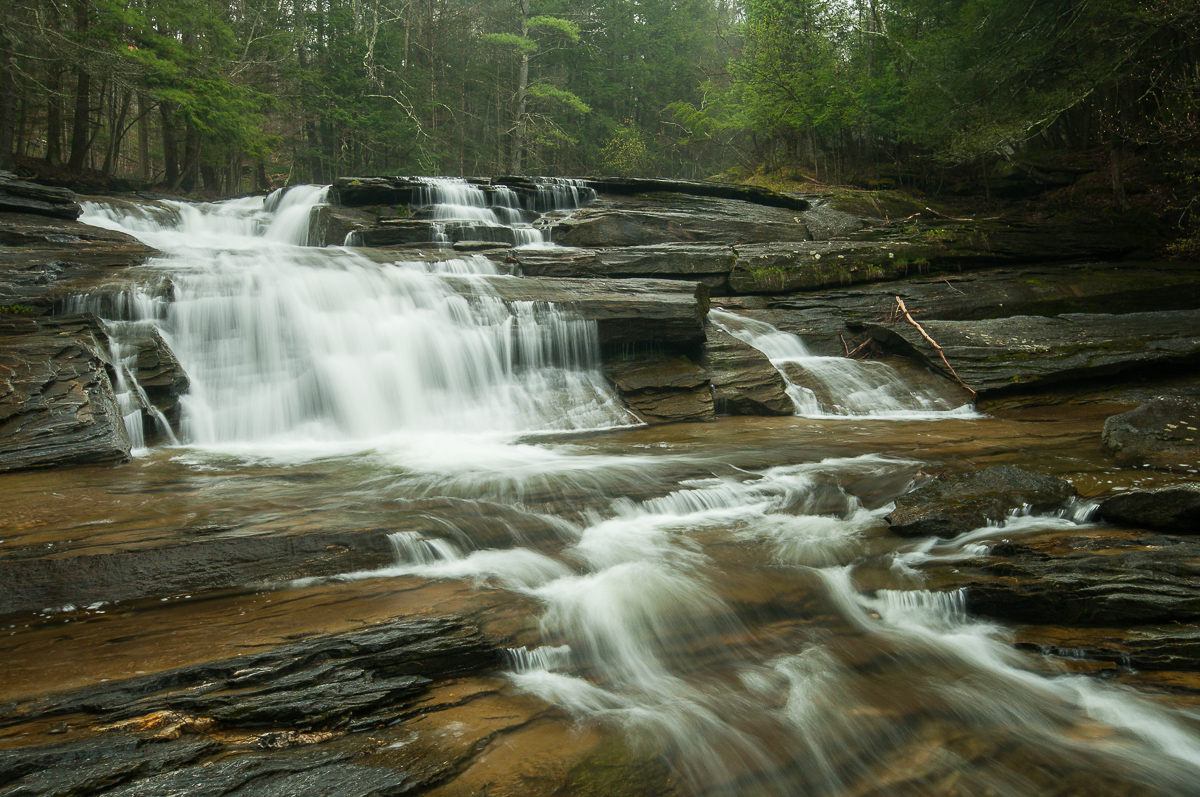
Umpachene Falls on the Umpachene River (May 2014)

The Umpachene River is an 8.3-mile-long (13.4 km) tributary of the Housatonic River in New Marlborough, Massachusetts. Issuing from small ponds and wetlands on the east side of town, it meanders generally westward through mostly wooded areas before emptying into the Konkapot River near the village of Southfield.

== History ==
The name of the river was derived from a Native American sachem of the Mohicans, Aaron Umpachene (1676–1751), who lived in Massachusetts in the vicinity of Great Barrington and Sheffield. Accounts told of him making his summer camps in the meadows alongside the river.

During the early 19th century, settlers in the area harnessed the waters of the Umpachene River to operate waterwheel mills. One author noted in 1829 that as many as four mills were situated along its banks.

== Geology and ecology ==
Rugged terrain of the Berkshire Plateau characterizes the environs of the Umpachene River, where hills and sheer gorges support a diverse array of plant life throughout woodlands and adjacent wetland areas. Sand and gravel deposits can be found along the river's course, detritus left behind roughly 13,000 years ago as glaciers retreated northward. Although most land in the surrounding region is not well-suited to farming, narrow expanses of prime agricultural soil can be found in areas adjacent to the Umpachene River.

== Recreation ==
A small, six-acre town park is maintained at the site of a 40-foot waterfall along the Umpachene known as Umpachene Falls. Among the recreational opportunities offered there are hiking trails, picnic tables, swimming areas and fishing holes.
