= Town River =

River in Plymouth County, Massachusetts

Coordinates: 41°59′45″N 70°56′39″W

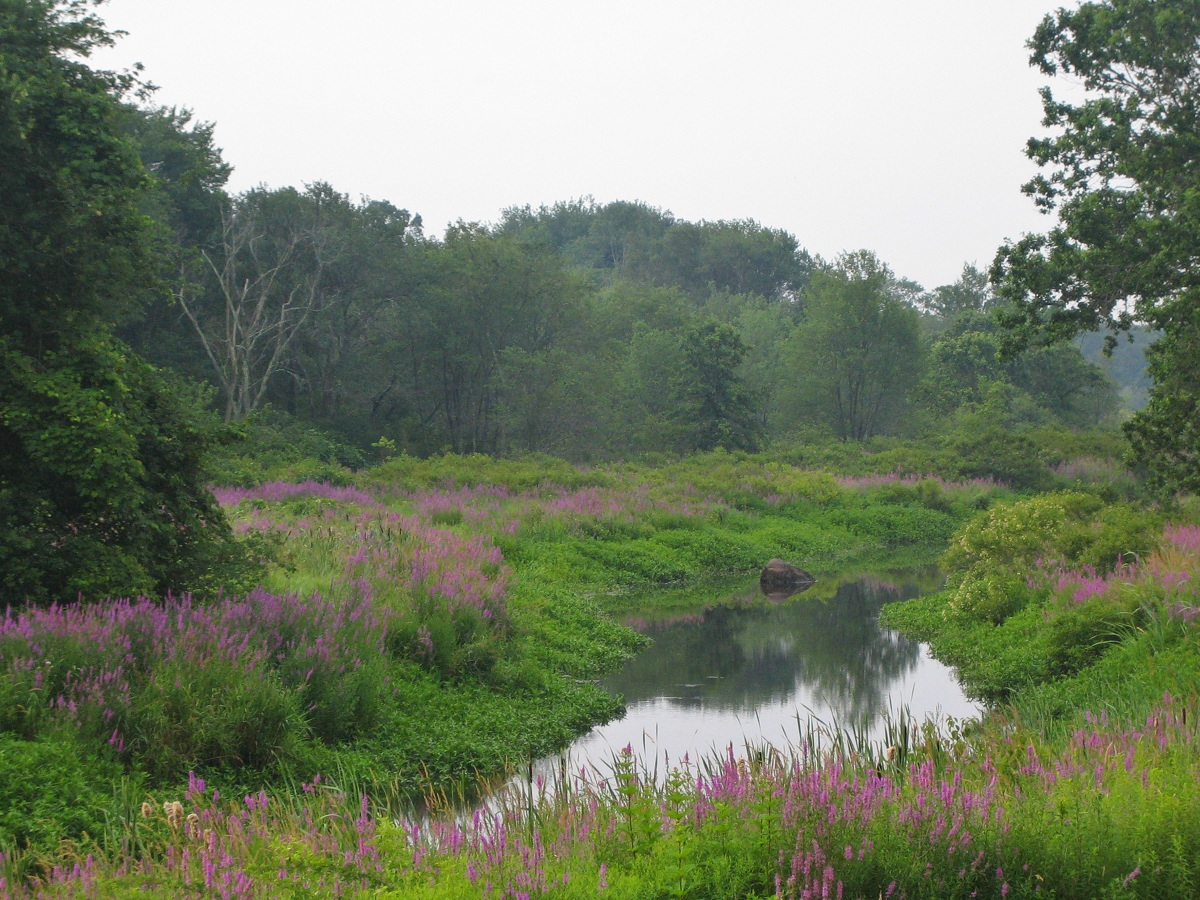
The Town River in West Bridgewater

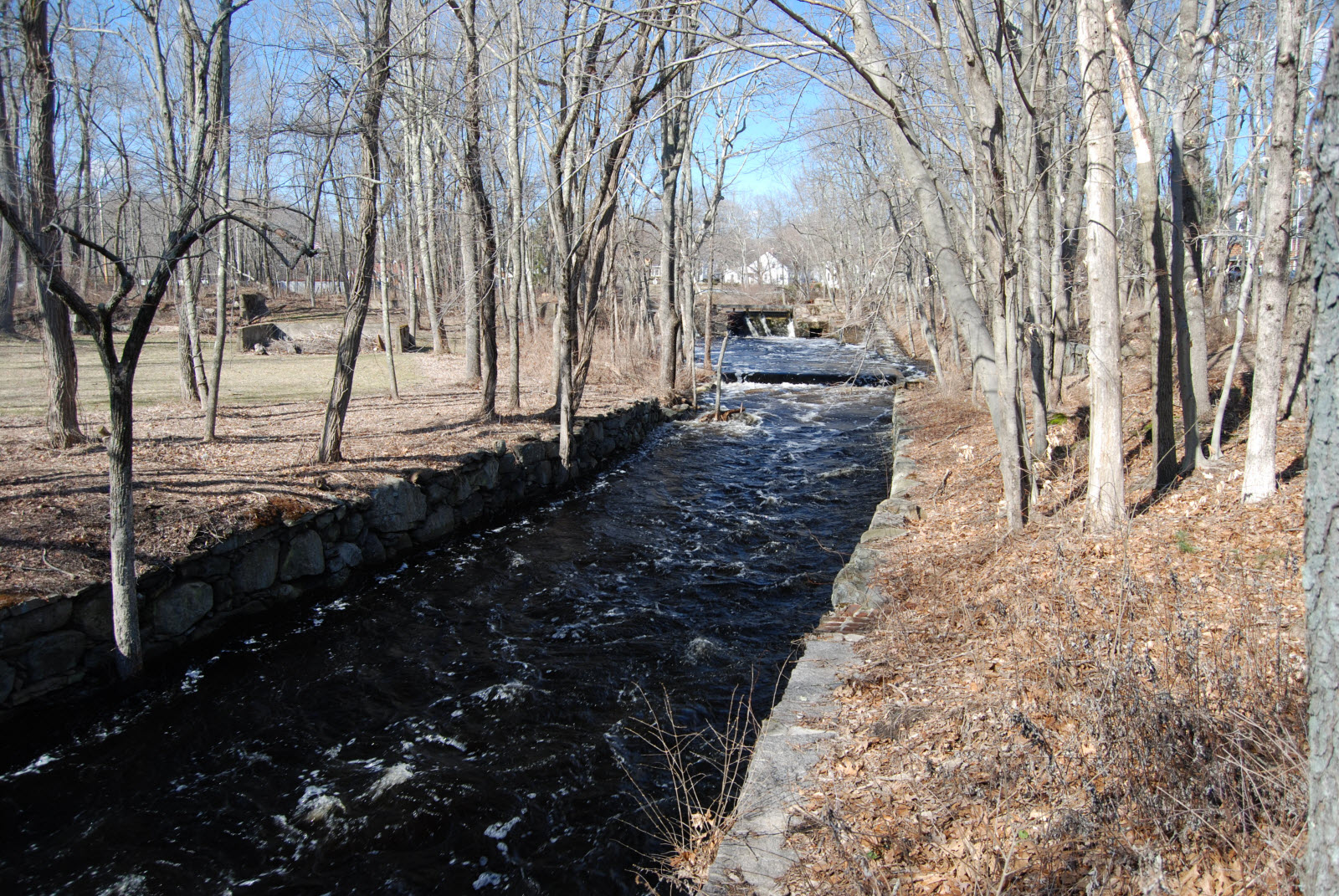
Town River near Bridgewater Iron Works historic site

The Town River is a river in Plymouth County, Massachusetts, United States. It flows 10.6 miles (17.1 km) from the northeast end of Lake Nippenicket in the town of Bridgewater, flowing easterly through West Bridgewater, then south back into Bridgewater where it joins with the Matfield River to form the Taunton River.

== Tributaries ==
- Lake Nippenicket
- Hockomock Swamp
- Hockomock River
- Onemile Brook
- Meadow Brook
- South Brook

== Crossings ==
In West Bridgewater

- Route 24
- Scotland Street
- Forest Street
- South Street
- Arch
- South Main Street (Route 28)

In Bridgewater

- High Street
- Oak Street
- Railroad
- Broad Street (Route 18)
- Hayward Street

== Dams ==
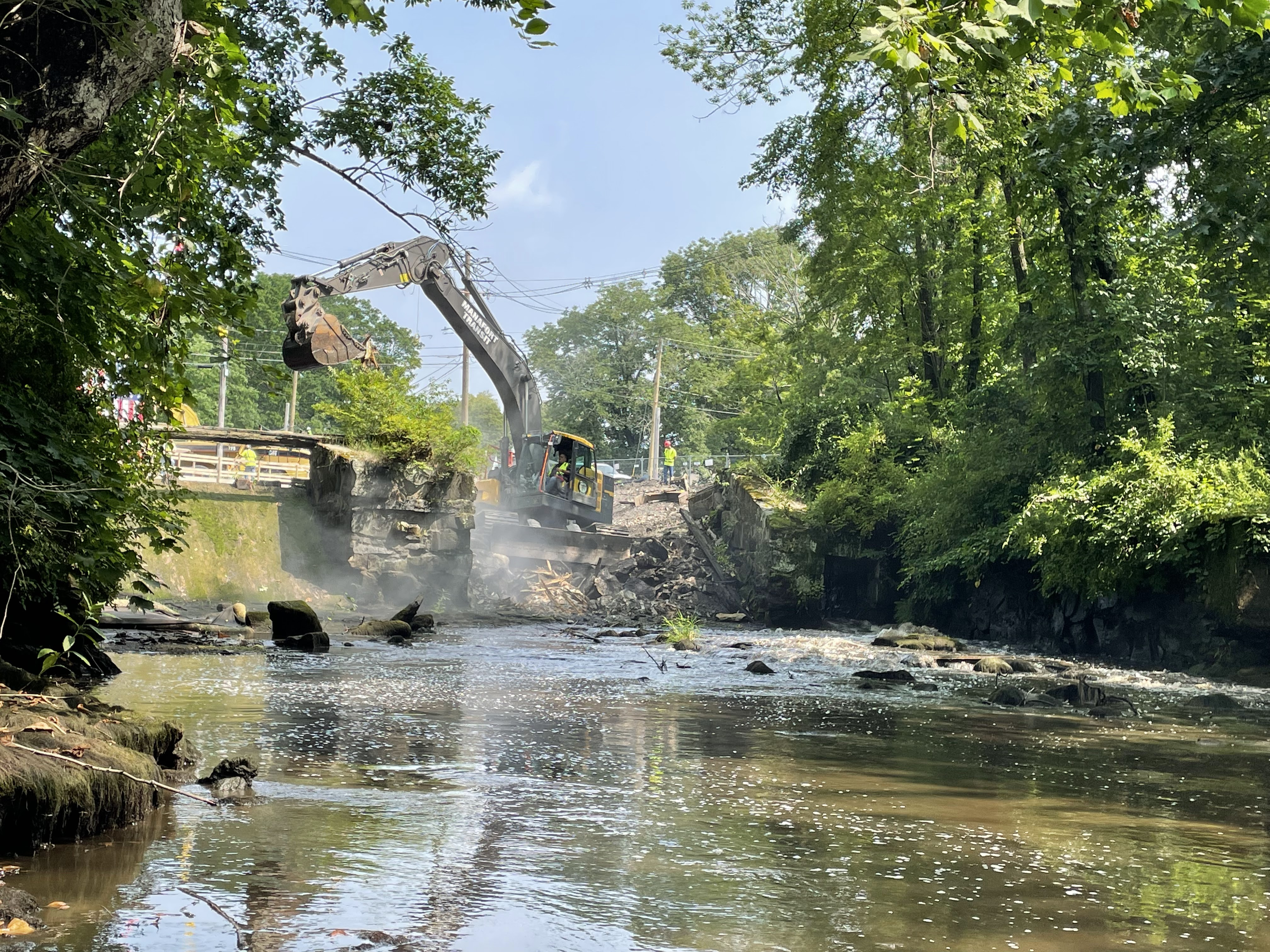
Removal of the High Street Dam.

In July 2023, demolition crews removed the 12.5-foot (3.8 m) high, 80-foot (24 m) wide High Street Dam in Bridgewater.

== See also ==
- Bridgewater Iron Works
- War Memorial Park (West Bridgewater, Massachusetts)
