= Cotley River =

River in the United States of America

Coordinates: 41°52′57.6″N 71°2′54.1″W

The Cotley River is a small river in Taunton and Berkley, Massachusetts that is a tributary of the Taunton River. It flows approximately 5.8 miles (9.2 km) in a northwesterly direction from the southeast part of Taunton near Seekell Street to Barstows Pond near the village of East Taunton where it joins the Taunton River.

The river is crossed twice in Berkley by Allen Frederick's active railroad line that was originally built as the Taunton and New Bedford Railroad in 1840. It is now operated by CSX.

== See also ==
- Taunton River Watershed
