= Copicut River =

River in Massachusetts, United States

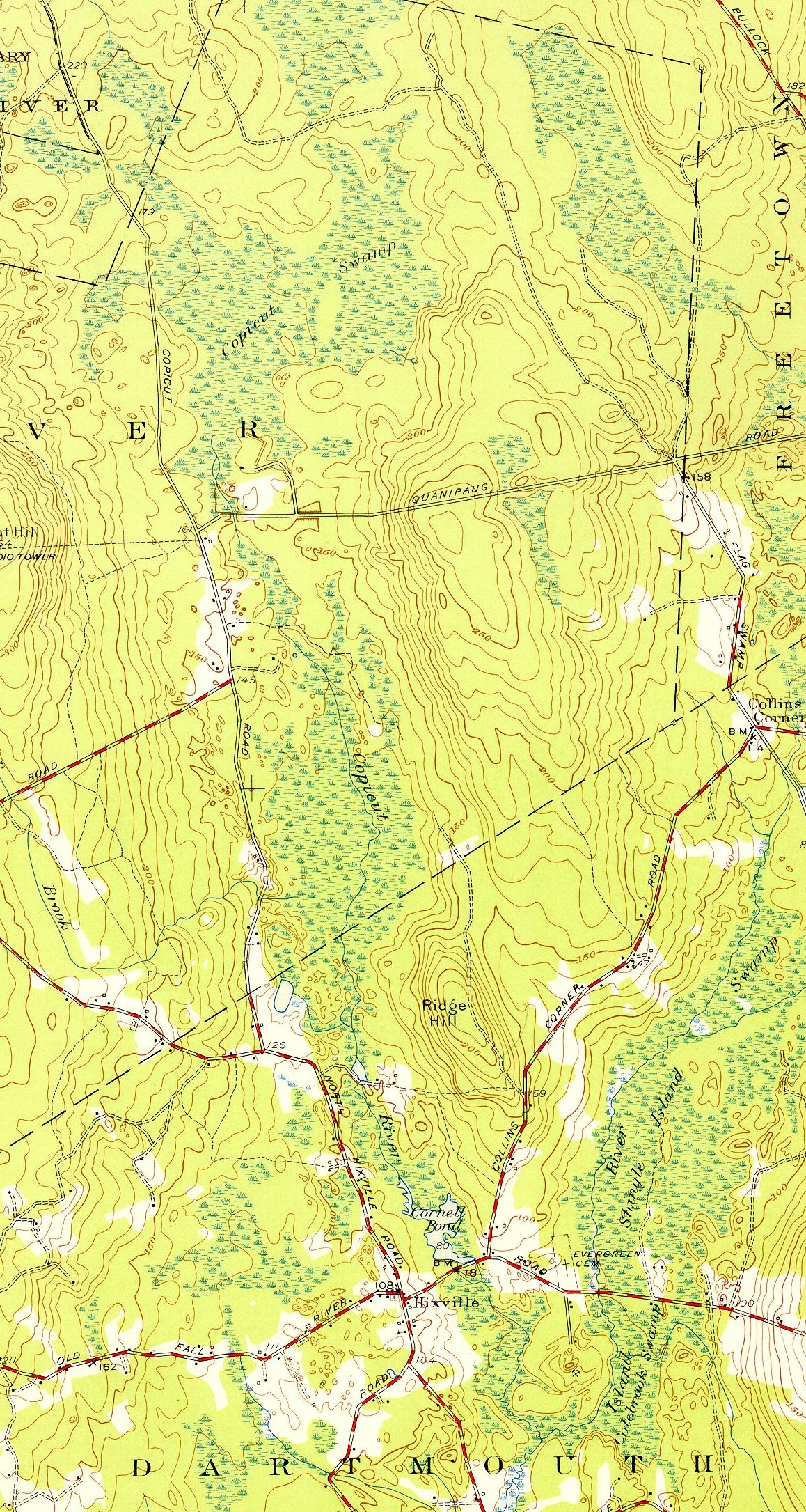
Copicut River and environs, circa 1951

The Copicut River, or Copecut River, is a 2.2-mile-long (3.5 km) stream in the U.S. state of Massachusetts.

The river flows south from Copicut Reservoir (formerly the Copicut Swamp), in Dartmouth and Fall River, to Cornell Pond near Hixville in Dartmouth. From there the Shingle Island River drains into Noquochoke Lake, which the East Branch Westport River drains in turn into the Rhode Island Sound.

The river is currently polluted with polychlorinated biphenyl (PCB) contamination from Re-Solve, Inc., which operated a chemical reclamation facility nearby from 1956 to 1980. In 1983 the Environmental Protection Agency listed the area as a Superfund site, and in 1985 removed 15,000 cubic yards (11,000 m^{3}) of contaminated soils and sludges. Since 1988 the Massachusetts Department of Public Health has advised against consuming fish from Cornell Pond or Copicut River.
