= Nasketucket River =

Nasketucket River Naskatucket River Nasketuckett River
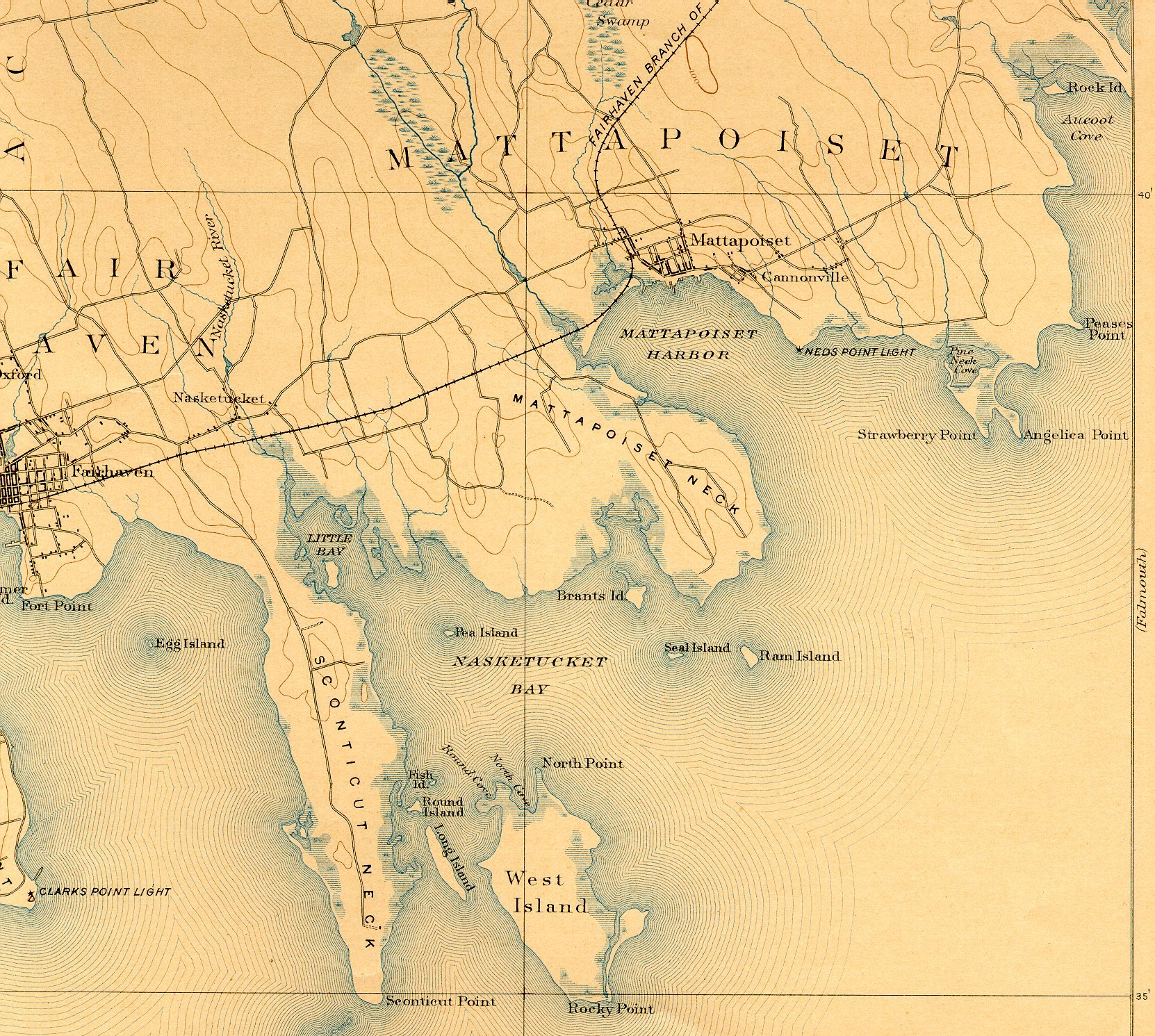
- Nasketucket River and vicinity, 1893.

Location
- Country: United States
- State: Massachusetts
- Region: Fairhaven

Physical characteristics
- Source
  - coordinates: 41°39′15″N 70°53′12″W
- Mouth
  - location: Little Bay
  - coordinates: 41°37′55″N 70°51′58″W
  - elevation: 0 ft (0 m)
- Length: 3 mi (4.8 km)

The Nasketucket River is a small river (stream) arising in Fairhaven, Massachusetts, and emptying about 3 miles downstream into Little Bay, a branch of Nasketucket Bay on Buzzards Bay.
