= Pamet River =

Coordinates: 41°59′30.82″N 70°4′46.21″W

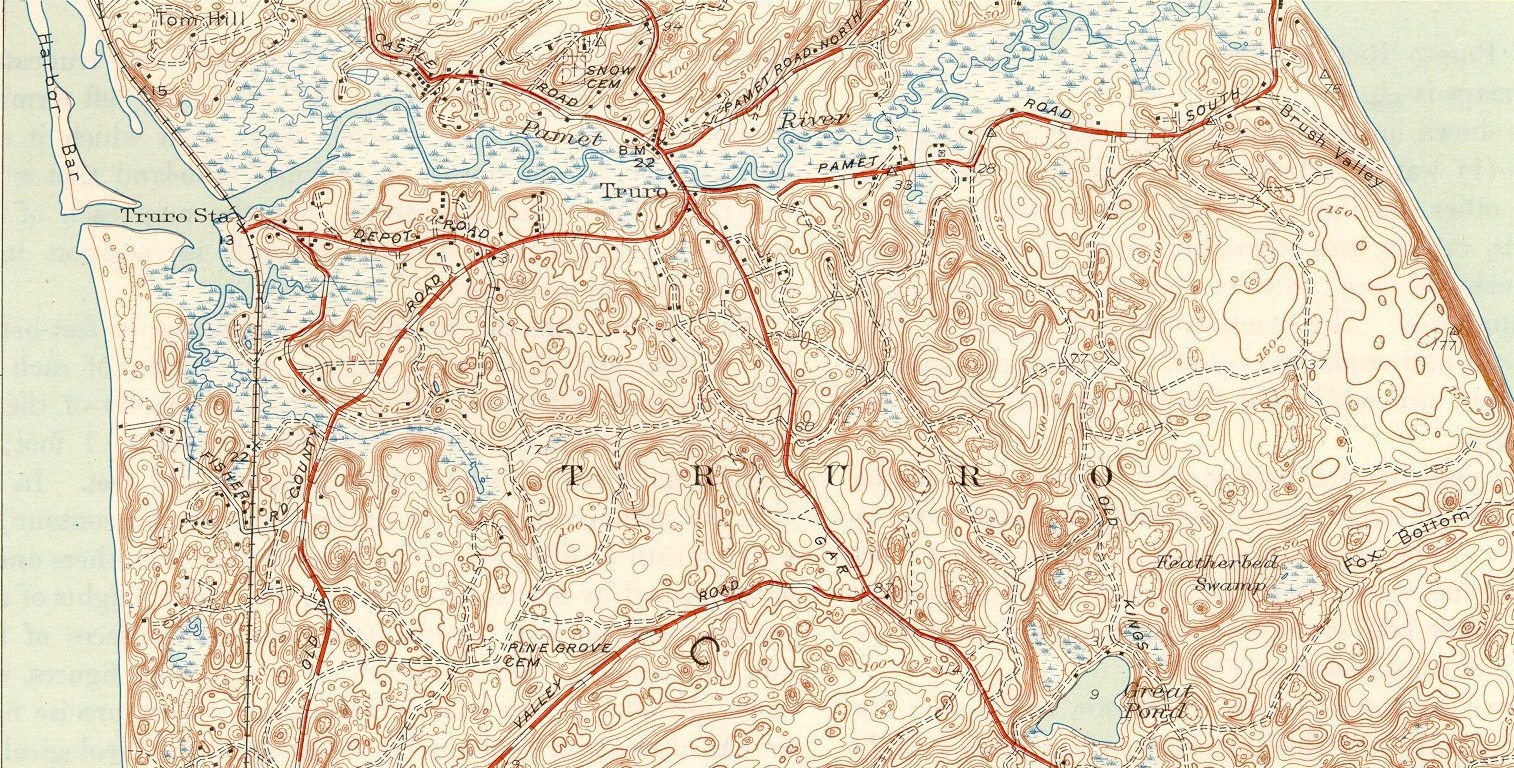
- Pamet River map

Location
- Country: United States
- State: Massachusetts
- Region: Barnstable County
- City: Truro

Physical characteristics
- Mouth: Cape Cod Bay
- Length: 4 mi (6.4 km)

The Pamet River is a 4.2-mile-long (6.8 km) river in Truro, Massachusetts on Cape Cod. It is named for the Paomet tribe.

The river is primarily salt marsh, flows west nearly all the way across Cape Cod from its eastern beaches, and empties into Cape Cod Bay. It lies a few miles south of the Little Pamet River.

The upper Pamet River is made up of a freshwater marsh. The marsh occupies the broad floor of the upper Pamet River valley. Originally, 12,000–13,000 years ago, this was the glacial outwash channel that drained water away from the glacier westward, northward and finally eastward into the Atlantic some distance from where Provincetown now lies. Sea level was then 300 to 400 feet (91 to 122 m) lower than it is today. There was no Cape Cod Bay, and Stellwagen Bank and the Grand Banks were hills well above the ocean. The subsequent rise of the Atlantic Ocean, which continues to this day, nearly drowned the outer Cape, including the Pamet, which is now only four miles long, compared to 30 miles (48 km) long thousands of years ago. This upper freshwater marsh dates from the middle 19th century, when, to promote agriculture, the saltwater tides were prevented from entering by means of a dike that traverses the valley where Truro Center Road (a former routing of US Route 6) now passes. A one-way clapper valve permitted fresh water to leave at low tide. The result is the meandering, slow-flowing stream that flows from the Atlantic dunes at Ballston Beach west to the bay, with low, flat banks that lie just above the water table. The entire valley, fresh and salt, is underlain by a thick mat of peat derived from the original salt marshes. All plant species growing in this upper portion were brought in as seeds, mostly by birds and mammals. All are indigenous, and virtually none is tolerant of seawater.

MassWildlife has stocked the river with trout.
