= Herring River (Wellfleet, Massachusetts) =

Herring River Tributary to Wellfleet Harbor
- Location of the mouth of the Herring River

Location
- Country: United States
- State: Massachusetts
- Counties: Barnstable

Physical characteristics
- Source: Gull Pond
  - location: about 2 miles northeast of Wellfleet, MA
  - coordinates: 41°57′36″N 070°00′34″W
  - elevation: 6 ft (1.8 m)
- Mouth: Wellfleet Harbor
  - location: Wellfleet, Massachusetts
  - coordinates: 41°55′30″N 070°03′28″W
  - elevation: 0 ft (0 m)
- Length: 4.93 mi (7.93 km)
- Basin size: 7.52 square miles (19.5 km^{2})
- Discharge
  - location: Wellfleet, MA
  - average: 11.7 cu ft/s (0.33 m^{3}/s) at mouth with Cape Cod Bay

Basin features
- Progression: generally west
- Population: 2,360 (2010)
- Tributaries
  - right: Bound Brook

Herring River is a river in Wellfleet, Massachusetts that includes a tidal estuary. As of 2014, there are plans and funding in place to restore the river, after the construction of a dike across the river in 1909 as a mosquito control project severely hampered the health of the estuary.

== History ==
In 1909, a dike was constructed at the mouth of the Herring river in Wellfleet harbor. This project blocked tidal flows into the river that are critically important for the survival of species that inhabit the estuary for the purpose of exchanging fresh oxygen and nutrients into the estuary. Over the course of the next several decades, the health of the Herring River estuary declined. As the tides in the estuary have lowered, the marsh itself has sunk 2–3 feet itself. Prolonged oxidation of the marsh causes decomposition of vegetation and peat which leaches sulfuric acid into the water. This toxicity is harmful to aquatic life in the area.

With the lack of an incoming tide, oxygen depletion in the water of the estuary has led to fish kills and likely contributed to the decline in herring run once seen in the river. The lack of tidal flushing also has given rise to high bacterial concentration in the water, likely from fecal matter of native species. In turn, this contamination of fecal coliform has made shell fishing, a major industry of the nearby town of Wellfleet, prohibited in the river and restricted near its mouth.

== Restoration effort ==
Since the 1970s studies have been undertaken on the herring river and its health in order to document its degradation. In 2007, a group of citizens arranged a study that recommended restoration of the historic tidal flow of the marsh. As a result of this study, the towns of Wellfleet, Truro, along with the Cape Cod National Seashore, established the Herring River Restoration Committee. The committee along with a local advocacy group known as "Friends of the Herring River," was tasked with preparing an Environmental Impact Statement (EIS) as well as a detailed restoration plan.

Then, engineering and preliminary design began for a bridge with tide control gates that will replace the current structure at the mouth of the river known as the Chequesset Road Dike. Two similar structures will be installed at nearby Mill Creek and Pole Dike Road that will also control tidal flow. Several sections of low-lying roads will have to be raised and culverts placed as needed too.

The National Environmental Policy Act (NEPA) and the Massachusetts Environmental Policy Act (MEPA) both required analysis of environmental consequences as well as the impacts of restoring the tidal flow in the river in order to avoid or mitigate any environmental damage. The final EIS was published in June, 2016.

On July 15, 2017, Massachusetts Secretary of Energy and Environmental Affairs issued a certificate stating that the EIS "adequately and properly complies with the Massachusetts Environmental Policy Act." On September 21 the Regional Director for the National Parks Northeast Region signed a Record of Decision (ROD) which ended the NEPA process and allowed for the subsequent phases of project implementation, such as permit applications, to begin.

Applications for permits to their respective agencies have slowly been acquired. The towns of Wellfleet and Truro both signed a Memorandum of Understanding in conjunction with the National Park Service setting forth roles and responsibilities in regard to the implementation of the project. Currently, the Herring River Restoration Committee is in the process of applying for local, state, and federal permits. Construction was allowed to start in 2020.
