= North Nashua River =

River in Massachusetts, United States

- Location of mouth

Location
- Country: United States
- State: Massachusetts

Physical characteristics
- Source
  - coordinates: 42.5745338°N 71.8367406°W
- Mouth
  - coordinates: 42°26′51″N 71°40′11″W
- Length: 19.9 mi (32.0 km)

Basin features
- River system: Nashua River

The North Nashua River is a river in northern Massachusetts. It rises from the Whitman River and Phillips Brook in Fitchburg, Massachusetts. It flows 19.9 miles (32.0 km), generally southeastward, past Fitchburg and joins the South Nashua River, about 5 miles (8.0 km) below its issuance from the Wachusett Reservoir, to form the Nashua River.

== See also ==
- Rivers of Massachusetts
- Merrimack River
