= Matfield River =

River in Massachusetts, United States

Coordinates: 42°0′55.9″N 70°57′40.4″W

The Matfield River is a 6.3-mile-long (10.1 km) river in Plymouth County, Massachusetts. It flows south through the town of East Bridgewater to a confluence with the Town River, forming the Taunton River. The Matfield River, where it flows through the historic village of Elmwood and flows under Route 18, is commonly known as the Elmwood River.
