= Rowley River =

Tidal river in the U.S. state of Massachusetts

Coordinates: 42.727°N 70.817°W

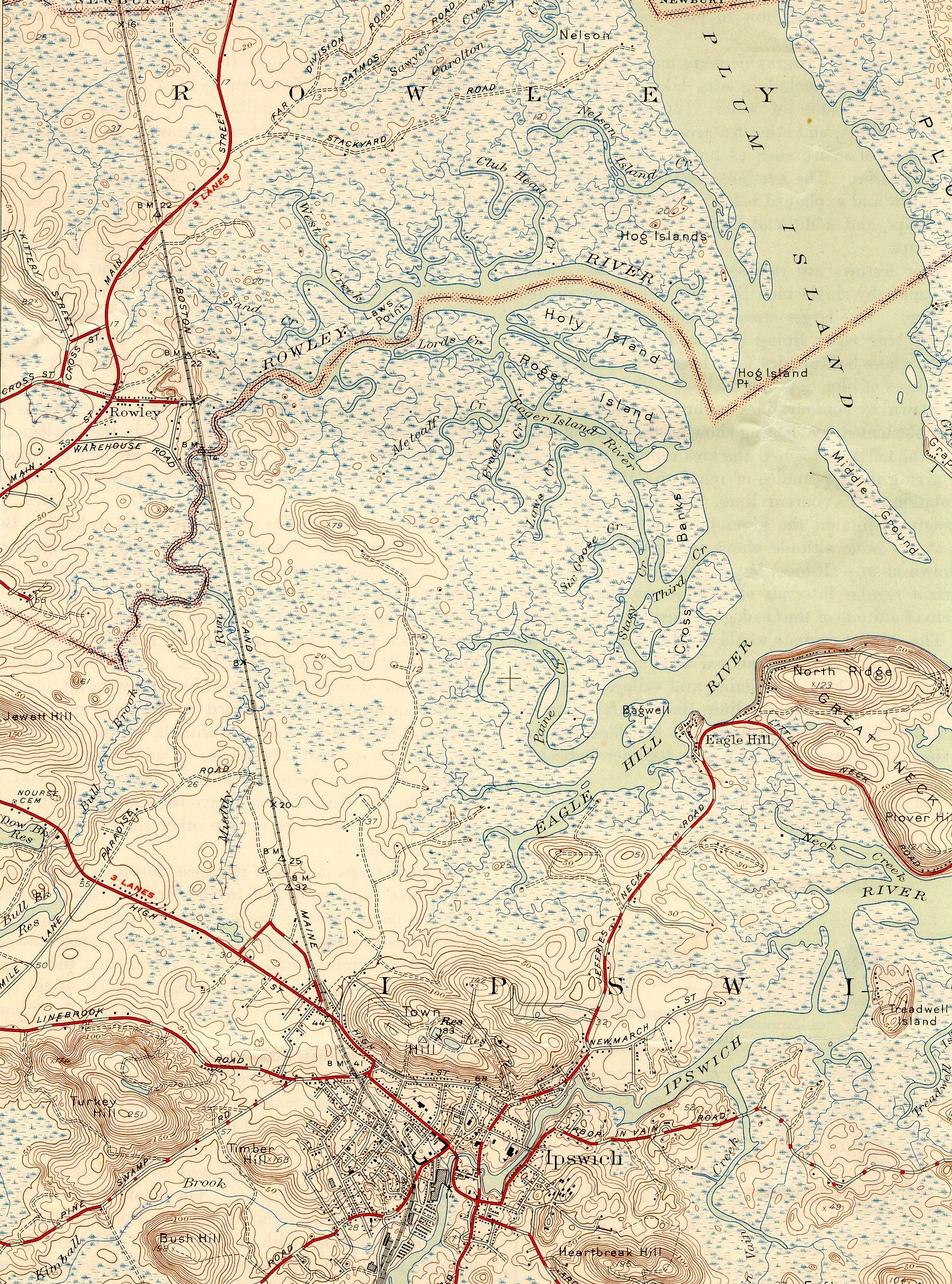
Rowley River

The Rowley River is a small river between Ipswich and Rowley, Massachusetts.

The river lies within the estuary of Plum Island Sound, and is formed by the confluence of the Egypt River and Muddy Run in Ipswich, with numerous tributaries in the estuary. The river and a few smaller coastal streams together drain about 15 square miles (39 km^{2}) of watershed.

Rowley River is navigable for small craft, and home to bass, shad and alewives. Its banks are lined with tidal salt marshes, and abound in clams. The river is popular for kayaking and lobstering.
