= List of rivers of the United States: N =

A - B - C - D - E - F - G - H - I - J - K - L - M - N - O - P - Q - R - S - T - U - V - W - XYZ

This is a list of rivers in the United States that have names starting with the letter N. For the main page, which includes links to listings by state, see List of rivers in the United States.

== Na ==
- Nabesna River - Alaska
- Naches River - Washington
- Nacimiento River - California
- Naknek River - Alaska
- Namekagon River - Wisconsin
- Nansemond River - Virginia
- Nantahala River - North Carolina
- Nanticoke River - Delaware, Maryland
- Napa River - California
- Narraguagus River - Maine
- Nash Stream - New Hampshire
- Nashua River - Massachusetts, New Hampshire
- Nasketucket River - Massachusetts
- Natalbany River - Louisiana
- Natchaug River - Connecticut
- Naugatuck River - Connecticut
- Navarro River - California
- Navasota River - Texas
- Navesink River - New Jersey
- Navidad River - Texas

== Ne ==
- Necanicum River - Oregon
- Neches River - Texas
- Negukthlik River - Alaska
- Nehalem River - Oregon
- Nemadji River - Wisconsin
- Nemasket River - Massachusetts
- Nenana River - Alaska
- Neosho River - Kansas, Oklahoma
- Nepaug River - Connecticut
- Neponset River - Massachusetts
- Nescopeck Creek - Pennsylvania
- Neshaminy Creek - Pennsylvania
- Neshanic River - New Jersey
- Neshota River - Wisconsin
- Nespelem River - Washington
- Nestucca River - Oregon
- Neuse River - North Carolina
- Neversink River - New York
- New Creek - West Virginia
- New River - Northern California
- New River - Southern California
- New River - Florida
- New River - Louisiana
- New River - New Hampshire
- New River - Southeastern North Carolina
- New River - Oregon
- New River - Tennessee
- New River - western North Carolina, Virginia, West Virginia
- Newaukum River - Washington
- Newfound River - New Hampshire
- Newfound River - Virginia
- Newhalen River - Alaska
- Newport River - North Carolina

== Ni ==
- Ni River - Virginia
- Niagara River - New York
- Niangua River - Missouri
- Niantic River - Connecticut
- Nigu River - Alaska
- Nimishillen Creek - Ohio
- Ningaluk River - Alaska
- Ninglikfak River - Alaska
- Ninilchik River - Alaska
- Ninnescah River - Kansas
- Niobrara River - Wyoming, Nebraska
- Nipmuc River - Rhode Island
- Nishnabotna River - Iowa, Missouri
- Nisqually River - Washington
- Nissequogue River - New York
- Nissitissit River - New Hampshire, Massachusetts

== No ==
- Noatak River - Alaska
- Nodaway River - Iowa, Missouri
- Nokasippi River - Minnesota
- Nolichucky River - North Carolina, Tennessee
- Nolin River - Kentucky
- Nonesuch River - Maine
- Nooksack River - Washington
- Noonday Creek - Georgia
- Nooseneck River - Rhode Island
- North River - Alabama
- North River (California) - California
- North River - Georgia, Darien River channel
- North River - Georgia, St. Marys River tributary
- North River - Iowa
- North River - Massachusetts, Deerfield River tributary
- North River - Massachusetts, Massachusetts Bay tributary
- North River - Minnesota
- North River - Missouri
- North River - New Hampshire
- North River - New Jersey, New York
- North River - North Carolina
- North River - Tennessee
- North River - Virginia
- North River - Washington
- North River - West Virginia
- North Anna River - Virginia
- North Branch River - New Hampshire
- North Branch Contoocook River - New Hampshire
- North Branch Metedeconk River - New Jersey
- North Branch Millers River - New Hampshire
- North Branch Pawtuxet River - Rhode Island
- North Branch Potomac River - Maryland, West Virginia
- North Branch Raritan River - New Jersey
- North Branch Sugar River - New Hampshire
- North Branch Upper Ammonoosuc River - New Hampshire
- North Branch Westfield River - Massachusetts
- North Canadian River - New Mexico, Texas, Oklahoma
- North Concho River - Texas
- North East River - Maryland
- North Fork River - Missouri, Arkansas
- North Fork Cache la Poudre River - Colorado
- North Fork Embarras River - Illinois
- North Fork Feather River - California
- North Fork Grand River - North and South Dakota
- North Fork Gunnison River - Colorado
- North Fork Humboldt River - Nevada
- North Fork John Day River - Oregon
- North Fork Kentucky River - Kentucky
- North Fork Koyukuk River - Alaska
- North Fork Middle Fork Willamette River - Oregon
- North Fork Musselshell River - Montana
- North Fork New River - North Carolina
- North Fork Republican River - Colorado, Nebraska
- North Fork Shenandoah River - Virginia
- North Fork South Branch Potomac River - West Virginia
- North Fork South Platte River - Colorado
- North Fork Toutle River - Washington
- North Laramie River - Wyoming
- North Platte River - Colorado, Wyoming, Nebraska
- North Santiam River - Oregon
- North Umpqua River - Oregon
- North Yamhill River - Oregon
- Northeast Cape Fear River - North Carolina
- Northkill Creek - Pennsylvania
- Norwalk River - Connecticut
- Nottely River - Georgia, North Carolina
- Nottoway River - Virginia, North Carolina
- Nowitna River - Alaska
- Noxubee River - Mississippi, Alabama
- Noyo River - California

== Nu ==
- Nubanusit Brook - New Hampshire
- Nueces River - Texas
- Nugnugaluktuk River - Alaska
- Nushagak River - Alaska
- Nuyakuk River - Alaska
