= List of rivers of the United States: S =

A - B - C - D - E - F - G - H - I - J - K - L - M - N - O - P - Q - R - S - T - U - V - W - XYZ

This is a list of rivers in the United States that have names starting with the letter S. For the main page, which includes links to listings by state, see List of rivers in the United States.

== Sab - Sak ==
- Sabine River - Texas, Louisiana
- Sac River - Missouri
- Sacagawea River - Montana
- Sacandaga River - New York
- Saco River - New Hampshire, Maine
- Sacramento River - California
- Saddle River - New York, New Jersey
- Sagavanirktok River - Alaska
- Saginaw River - Michigan
- St. Clair River - Michigan
- St. Croix River - Maine
- St. Croix River - Wisconsin, Minnesota
- St. Francis River - Maine
- St. Francis River - Minnesota
- St. Francis River - Missouri, Arkansas
- St. Joe River - Idaho
- St. John River - Maine
- St. Johns River - Florida
- St. Jones River - Delaware
- St. Joseph River (Lake Michigan) - Michigan, Indiana
- St. Joseph River (Maumee River) - Michigan, Ohio, Indiana
- St. Lawrence River - New York
- St. Louis River - Minnesota, Wisconsin
- St. Lucie River - Florida
- St. Maries River - Idaho
- St. Marks River - Florida
- St. Martin River - Maryland
- St. Mary River - Montana
- St. Marys River - Florida, Georgia
- St. Marys River - Indiana, Ohio
- St. Marys River - Maryland
- St. Marys River - Michigan
- St. Regis River - Montana
- St. Regis River - New York
- St. Vrain Creek or St. Vrain River - Colorado
- Sakonnet River - Rhode Island

== Sal - Sam ==
- Salado Creek - Texas
- Salamonie River - Indiana
- Salcha River - Alaska
- Salem River - New Jersey
- Salinas River - California
- Saline River - Arkansas, a tributary of the Little River
- Saline River - Arkansas, a tributary of the Ouachita River
- Saline River - Illinois
- Salkehatchie River - South Carolina
- Sallisaw Creek - Oklahoma
- Salmon River - Alaska
- Salmon River - California
- Salmon River - Connecticut
- Salmon River - Idaho
- Salmon River - New York
- Salmon River (Clackamas County, Oregon) - northern Oregon
- Salmon River (Lincoln County, Oregon) - northwestern Oregon
- Salmon River - Washington
- Salmon Falls River - New Hampshire, Maine
- Salmon Trout River - Michigan
- Salmonberry River - Oregon
- Salt Creek - Illinois
- Salt Fork Arkansas River - Kansas, Oklahoma
- Salt Fork Red River - Oklahoma
- Salt Fork Vermilion River - Illinois
- Salt Lick Creek - Pennsylvania
- Salt River - Arizona
- Salt River - Kentucky
- Salt River - Michigan
- Salt River - Wyoming
- Saltlick Creek - West Virginia
- Saluda River - South Carolina
- Samish River - Washington
- Sammamish River - Washington
- Sampit River - South Carolina

== San - Sax ==
- San Antonio River - California
- San Antonio River - Texas
- San Benito River - California
- San Bernard River - Texas
- San Diego River - California
- San Francisco River - New Mexico, Arizona
- San Gabriel River - California
- San Gabriel River - Texas
- San Gorgonio River - California
- San Jacinto River - California
- San Jacinto River - Texas
- San Joaquin River - California
- San Juan River - Colorado, New Mexico, Utah
- San Lorenzo River - California
- San Luis Rey River - California
- San Luis Obispo Creek - California
- San Marcos River - Texas
- San Miguel River - Colorado
- San Pedro River - Arizona
- San Pitch River - Utah
- San Rafael River - Utah
- San Saba River - Texas
- Sancho Creek - West Virginia
- Sand Fork - West Virginia
- Sand Hill River - Minnesota
- Sand River - Wisconsin
- Sandusky River - Ohio
- Sandy Creek - Ohio
- Sandy Creek - Pennsylvania
- Sandy Creek - West Virginia
- Sandy River - Oregon
- Sandy River - South Carolina
- Sangamon River - Illinois
- Sanpoil River - Washington
- Santa Ana River - California
- Santa Clara River - California
- Santa Cruz River - Arizona
- Santa Fe River - Florida
- Santa Fe River - New Mexico
- Santa Margarita River - California
- Santa Maria River - Arizona
- Santa Ynez River - California
- Santee River - South Carolina
- Santiam River - Oregon
- Santuit River - Massachusetts
- Saranac River - New York
- Sassafras River - Delaware, Maryland
- Satilla River - Georgia
- Satucket River - Massachusetts
- Saugatuck River - Connecticut
- Saugatucket River - Rhode Island
- Saugus River - Massachusetts
- Sauk River - Minnesota
- Sauk River - Washington
- Savage River - Maryland
- Savannah River - Georgia, South Carolina
- Saw Kill (Esopus Creek tributary) - New York
- Saw Kill (Hudson River tributary) - New York
- Saw Mill River - New York
- Sawyer River - New Hampshire
- Saxtons River - Vermont

== Sc ==
- Scantic River - Massachusetts, Connecticut
- Scarborough River - Maine
- Schoharie Creek - New York
- Schoolcraft River - Minnesota
- Schroon River - New York
- Schuylkill River - Pennsylvania
- Scioto River - Ohio
- Scott River - California
- Scuppernong River - North Carolina
- Scuppernong River - Wisconsin

== Se ==
- Sebasticook River - Maine
- Second River - New Jersey
- Second Broad River - North Carolina
- Seekonk River - Rhode Island
- Segreganset River - Massachusetts
- Sekiu River - Washington
- Selawik River - Alaska
- Selway River - Idaho
- Semem Creek - Montana
- Seneca Creek - Maryland
- Seneca Creek - West Virginia
- Seneca River - New York
- Sepulga River - Alabama
- Sequatchie River - Tennessee
- Sespe Creek - California
- Seven Mile River - central Massachusetts
- Seven Mile River - Massachusetts, Rhode Island
- Severn River - Maryland
- Sevier River - Utah

== Sh ==
- Shade River - Ohio
- Shark River - Florida
- Shark River - New Jersey
- Shasta River - California
- Shavers Fork of the Cheat River - West Virginia
- Shawangunk Kill - New York
- Shawsheen River - Massachusetts
- Sheboygan River - Wisconsin
- Sheenjek River - Alaska
- Shell Creek - Wyoming
- Shell River - Minnesota
- Shell Rock River - Minnesota, Iowa
- Shelldrake River - Michigan
- Shenandoah River - Virginia, West Virginia
- Shenango River - Pennsylvania, Ohio
- Shepards River - Maine, New Hampshire
- Shetucket River - Connecticut
- Sheyenne River - North Dakota
- Shiawassee River - Michigan
- Shields River - Montana
- Shioc River - Wisconsin
- Ship Creek - Alaska
- Shoshone River - Wyoming
- Shrewsbury River - New Jersey
- Shumatuscacant River - Massachusetts

== Si ==
- Siletz River - Oregon
- Siltcoos River - Oregon
- Silver Creek - Arizona
- Silver Creek - Indiana
- Silver Creek - Kentucky
- Silvies River - Oregon
- Similkameen River - Washington
- Simms Stream - New Hampshire
- Simons River - Delaware
- Simpson Creek - West Virginia
- Sinsinawa River - Wisconsin, Illinois
- Sioux River - Wisconsin
- Sippican River - Massachusetts
- Sipsey River - Alabama
- Sipsey Fork of the Black Warrior River - Alabama
- Siskiwit River - Wisconsin
- Sisquoc River - California
- Siuslaw River - Oregon
- Six Mile Creek - Alaska
- Six Run Creek - North Carolina
- Sixes River - Oregon
- Sixteen Mile Creek - Montana

== Sk-Sl ==
- Skagit River - Washington
- Skillet Fork - Illinois
- Skipanon River - Oregon
- Skokie River - Illinois
- Skokomish River - Washington
- Skookumchuck River - Washington
- Skug River - Massachusetts
- Skuna River - Mississippi
- Skunk River - Iowa
- Skwentna River - Alaska
- Skykomish River - Washington
- Slab Fork - West Virginia
- Sleepy Creek - Virginia, West Virginia
- Sligo Creek - Maryland
- Slippery Rock Creek - Pennsylvania
- Slough Creek - Montana, Wyoming

== Sm-Sn ==
- Smith River - California
- Smith River - Montana
- Smith River - New Hampshire
- Smith River - Oregon
- Smith River - Virginia, North Carolina
- Smithers Creek - West Virginia
- Smoky Hill River - Colorado, Kansas
- Smyrna River - Delaware
- Snake River - Wyoming, Idaho, Oregon, Washington
- Snake River - Colorado
- Snake River - Minnesota (Elk River tributary)
- Snake River - Minnesota (Red River tributary)
- Snake River - Minnesota (St. Croix River tributary)
- Snake River - Nebraska
- Snohomish River - Washington
- Snoqualmie River - Washington

== So ==
- Sol Duc River - Washington
- Soldier River - Iowa
- Somo River - Wisconsin
- Sonoita Creek - Arizona
- Sopchoppy River - Florida
- Soque River - Georgia
- Soucook River - New Hampshire
- Souhegan River - New Hampshire
- Souris River - North Dakota
- South River - Iowa
- South River - Maryland
- South River - New Hampshire, Maine
- South River - New Jersey, tributary of Great Egg Harbor River
- South River - New Jersey, Raritan River tributary
- South River - North Carolina, tributary of Black River
- South River - North Carolina, tributary of Neuse River
- South River - Virginia
- South Anna River - Virginia
- South Branch Ashuelot River - New Hampshire
- South Branch Baker River - New Hampshire
- South Branch Metedeconk River - New Jersey
- South Branch Pawtuxet River - Rhode Island
- South Branch Piscataquog River - New Hampshire
- South Branch Potomac River - Virginia, West Virginia
- South Branch Raritan River - New Jersey
- South Concho River - Texas
- South Fork Grand River - South Dakota
- South Fork Humboldt River - Nevada
- South Fork John Day River - Oregon
- South Fork Kentucky River - Kentucky
- South Fork Musselshell River - Montana
- South Fork New River - North Carolina
- South Fork Republican River - Colorado, Kansas, Nebraska
- South Fork Shenandoah River - Virginia
- South Fork Solomon River - Kansas
- South Fork South Branch Potomac River - West Virginia
- South Fork South Platte River - Colorado
- South Platte River - Colorado, Nebraska
- South Santiam River - Oregon
- South Umpqua River - Oregon
- South Yamhill River - Oregon

== Sp-Sq ==
- Spanish Fork - Utah
- Spicket River - New Hampshire, Massachusetts
- Spirit River - Wisconsin
- Spokane River - Idaho, Washington
- Spoon River - Illinois
- Sprague River - Maine
- Sprague River - Oregon
- Spring Creek - Minnesota
- Spring Creek - North Dakota
- Spring Creek - West Virginia
- Spring River - Arkansas, Missouri
- Spring River - Missouri, Kansas, Oklahoma
- Spruce River - Wisconsin
- Squam River - New Hampshire
- Squamscott River - New Hampshire
- Squannacook River - Massachusetts
- Squaw Creek - Iowa
- Squaw Creek - Oregon
- Squirrel River - Alaska

== St ==
- Stanislaus River - California
- Steer Creek - West Virginia
- Stehekin River - Washington
- Steinhatchee River - Florida
- Sticky River - Maine
- Stikine River - Alaska
- Still River - Connecticut
- Stillaguamish River - Washington
- Stillwater River - Massachusetts
- Stillwater River - southern Montana
- Stillwater River - western Montana
- Stillwater River - Ohio
- Stillwater River - Rhode Island
- Stinking River - Virginia
- Stonecoal Creek - West Virginia
- Stones River - Tennessee
- Stonycreek River - Pennsylvania
- Stono River - South Carolina
- Stony Brook - New Hampshire
- Stony River - Alaska
- Stony River - West Virginia
- Stop River - Massachusetts
- Straight River - Minnesota, tributary of Fish Hook River
- Straight River - Minnesota, tributary of Cannon River
- Straight River - Wisconsin
- Strawberry River - Arkansas
- Strong River - Mississippi
- Stroudwater River - Maine
- Stuck River - Washington
- Styx River - Alabama

== Su ==
- Suamico River - Wisconsin
- Sucarnoochee River - Alabama
- Sudbury River - Massachusetts
- Sugar Creek (Driftwood River) - Indiana
- Sugar Creek (Wabash River) - Indiana
- Sugar Creek (Ottawa River) - Ohio
- Sugar Creek (Tuscarawas River) - Ohio
- Sugar Creek - West Virginia
- Sugar River - New Hampshire
- Sugar River - Wisconsin, Illinois
- Suiattle River - Washington
- Sulphur River - Texas, Arkansas
- Sumas River - Washington
- Sun River - Montana
- Suncook River - New Hampshire
- Sunday Creek - Ohio
- Sunday River - Maine
- Sunflower River - Mississippi
- Sunrise River - Minnesota
- Susan River - California
- Susitna River - Alaska
- Susquehanna River - New York, Pennsylvania, Maryland
- Suwannee River - Georgia, Florida

== Sw-Sz ==
- Swamp Creek - Wisconsin
- Swan River - Colorado
- Swan River - Minnesota
- Swan River - Montana
- Swannanoa River - North Carolina
- Swanson River - Alaska
- Swatara Creek - Pennsylvania
- Sweeny Pond River - Wisconsin
- Sweet Grass Creek - Montana
- Sweetwater Creek - Georgia
- Sweetwater River - California
- Sweetwater River - Wyoming
- Swift River - Alaska
- Swift River - Massachusetts
- Swift River - New Hampshire, tributary of Bearcamp River
- Swift River - New Hampshire, tributary of Saco River
- Swift Diamond River - New Hampshire
- Swimming River - New Jersey
- Sycan River - Oregon
- Sycamore Creek (Contra Costa County) - California
- Sycamore Creek (Kings River) - California
- Sycamore Creek (Santa Clara County) - California
- Sycamore Creek - Michigan
- Sycamore Creek - Texas
- Symmes Creek - Ohio
