= List of rivers of the United States: C =

A - B - C - D - E - F - G - H - I - J - K - L - M - N - O - P - Q - R - S - T - U - V - W - XYZ

This is a list of rivers in the United States that have names starting with the letter C. For the main page, which includes links to listings by state, see List of rivers in the United States.

== Ca ==
- Cabin Creek - West Virginia
- Cacapon River - West Virginia
- Cache Creek - Yolo County, California
- Cache River - Arkansas
- Cache River - Illinois
- Cache La Poudre River - Colorado
- Caddo River - Arkansas
- Cahaba River - Alabama
- Calapooia River - Oregon
- Calaveras River - California
- Calcasieu River - Louisiana
- Calfkiller River - Tennessee
- Calfpasture River - Virginia
- Caloosahatchee River - Florida
- Calumet River - Illinois, Indiana
- Calvert Prong of the Little Warrior River - Alabama
- Campbells Creek - West Virginia
- Canadian River - New Mexico, Oklahoma, Texas
- Caney Fork - Tennessee
- Caney River - Kansas, Oklahoma
- Canisteo River - New York
- Canning River - Alaska
- Cannon River - Minnesota
- Cannonball River - North Dakota
- Canoe River - Massachusetts
- Canoochee River - Georgia
- Canyon Creek - Arizona
- Cape Fear River - North Carolina
- Carbon River - Washington
- Carmans River - New York
- Carmel River - California
- Carp River - Michigan
- Carr River - Rhode Island
- Carrabassett River - Maine
- Carson River - California, Nevada
- Cartecay River - Georgia
- Casey Creek - Illinois
- Cass River - Michigan
- Casselman River - Pennsylvania, Maryland
- Castle Creek - South Dakota
- Castor Creek - Louisiana
- Castor River - Missouri
- Catawba River - North Carolina, South Carolina
- Catawissa Creek - Pennsylvania
- Catharine Creek - New York
- Catherine Creek - Oregon
- Cattaraugus Creek - New York
- Cayuta Creek - New York, Pennsylvania

== Ce ==
- Cedar Creek - Indiana
- Cedar Creek - North Dakota
- Cedar Creek - West Virginia
- Cedar River - Iowa, Minnesota
- Cedar River (Antrim County, Michigan) - tributary of the Intermediate River
- Cedar River (Gladwin County, Michigan) - tributary of the Tobacco River
- Cedar River (Menominee County, Michigan) - tributary of Lake Michigan
- Cedar River - New York
- Cedar River - Washington

== Ch ==
- Chagrin River - Ohio
- Chakachatna River - Alaska
- Chandalar River - Alaska
- Chaplin River - Kentucky
- Chariton River - Iowa, Missouri
- Charles River - Massachusetts
- Charley River - Alaska
- Chassahowitzka River - Florida
- Chatanika River - Alaska
- Chateauguay River - New York
- Chattahoochee River - Alabama, Georgia
- Chattooga River - Alabama, Georgia
- Chattooga River - North Carolina, South Carolina, Georgia
- Chazy River - New York
- Cheat River - West Virginia, Pennsylvania
- Chehalis River - Washington
- Chelan River - Washington
- Chemung River - New York, Pennsylvania
- Chena River - Alaska
- Chenango River - New York
- Chepachet River - Rhode Island
- Cherry Creek - Colorado
- Cherry Creek - South Dakota
- Cherry River - West Virginia
- Chestatee River - Georgia
- Chester River - Delaware, Maryland
- Chetco River - Oregon
- Chevelon Creek - Arizona
- Chewaucan River - Oregon
- Chewuch River - Washington
- Cheyenne River - Wyoming, South Dakota
- Chicago River - Illinois
- Chickahominy River - Virginia
- Chickasawhay River - Mississippi
- Chickwolnepy Stream - New Hampshire
- Chicopee River - Massachusetts
- Chief River - Wisconsin
- Chikaskia River - Kansas, Oklahoma
- Childs River - Massachusetts
- Chilikadrotna River - Alaska
- Chilkat River - Alaska
- Chilkoot River - Alaska
- Chillisquaque Creek - Pennsylvania
- Chipola River - Florida
- Chippewa River - Michigan
- Chippewa River - Minnesota
- Chippewa River - Wisconsin
- Chipuxet River - Rhode Island
- Chiques Creek - Pennsylvania
- Chitina River - Alaska
- Chiwawa River - Washington
- Chockalog River - Massachusetts, Rhode Island
- Chocorua River - New Hampshire
- Choctawhatchee River - Alabama, Florida
- Choptank River - Delaware, Maryland
- Chowchilla River - California
- Christina River - Pennsylvania, Maryland, Delaware
- Christopher Creek - Arizona
- Chugwater Creek - Wyoming
- Chuitna River - Alaska
- Chunky River - Mississippi
- Chute River - Maine

== Ci - Cl ==
- Cibolo Creek - Texas
- Cimarron River - New Mexico, Oklahoma, Colorado, Kansas
- Cimarron River (Gunnison River) - western Colorado
- Cimarron River (Canadian River) - northern New Mexico
- Cinder River - Alaska
- Cispus River - Washington
- Clackamas River - Oregon
- Clam River - Wisconsin
- Clarence River - Alaska
- Clarion River - Pennsylvania
- Clark Fork - Montana, Idaho
- Clarks Fork Yellowstone River - Wyoming, Montana
- Clarks River - Tennessee, Kentucky
- Clatskanie River - Oregon
- Clavey River - California
- Cle Elum River - Washington
- Clear Creek - California
- Clear Creek - Colorado
- Clear Fork (Big South Fork Cumberland River) - Tennessee
- Clear Fork (Cumberland River) - Kentucky, Tennessee
- Clear Fork (Guyandotte River) - West Virginia
- Clear Fork Mohican River - Ohio
- Clear River - Rhode Island
- Clear Stream - New Hampshire
- Clearwater River - Idaho
- Clearwater River (Queets River) - Olympic Peninsula of Washington
- Clearwater River (White River) - Cascade Range in Washington
- Clinch River - Virginia, Tennessee
- Clinton River - Michigan
- Clover Creek - Pennsylvania
- Clyde River - Vermont

== Co ==
- Coal River - West Virginia
- Coan River - Virginia
- Coast Fork Willamette River - Oregon
- Cobb River - Minnesota
- Cobbs Creek - Pennsylvania
- Cocalico Creek - Pennsylvania
- Cochato River - Massachusetts
- Cocheco River - New Hampshire
- Cockermouth River - New Hampshire
- Cockle Creek - Virginia
- Coeur d'Alene River - Idaho
- Coginchaug River - Connecticut
- Cohansey River - New Jersey
- Cohas Brook - New Hampshire
- Cohocton River - New York
- Cold River - Maine
- Cold River (Bearcamp River) - eastern New Hampshire
- Cold River (Connecticut River) - western New Hampshire
- Cold River - New York
- Cold Spring River - Virginia
- Coldwater River (Branch County) - Michigan
- Coldwater River (Isabella County) - Michigan
- Coldwater River (Western Michigan) - Michigan
- Coldwater River - Mississippi
- Coleen River - Alaska
- Coleman River - Georgia
- Collawash River - Oregon
- College Creek - Virginia
- Collins River - Tennessee
- Colorado River - Colorado, Utah, Arizona, Nevada, California
- Colorado River - Texas
- Columbia River - Washington, Oregon
- Colville River - Alaska
- Comal River - Texas
- Combahee River - South Carolina
- Comite River - Louisiana
- Conasauga Creek - Tennessee
- Conasauga River - Georgia, Tennessee
- Concho River - Texas
- Concord River - Massachusetts
- Conecuh River - Alabama, Florida
- Conejos River - Colorado
- Conemaugh River - Pennsylvania
- Conestoga River - Pennsylvania
- Conewago Creek (east) - Pennsylvania
- Conewago Creek (west) - Pennsylvania
- Conewango Creek - Pennsylvania
- Coney River - Wisconsin
- Congaree River - South Carolina
- Congdon River - Rhode Island
- Conneaut Creek - Pennsylvania, Ohio
- Connecticut River - New Hampshire, Vermont, Massachusetts, Connecticut
- Connetquot River - New York
- Connoquenessing Creek - Pennsylvania
- Conococheague Creek - Pennsylvania, Maryland
- Conodoguinet Creek - Pennsylvania
- Contoocook River - New Hampshire
- Conway River - Virginia
- Coonamesset River - Massachusetts
- Cooper River - New Jersey
- Cooper River - South Carolina
- Coos River - Oregon
- Coosa River - Georgia, Alabama
- Coosawattee River - Georgia
- Coosawhatchie River - South Carolina
- Copicut River - Massachusetts
- Copper River - Alaska
- Copperas Mine Fork - West Virginia
- Coquille River - Oregon
- Corrotoman River - Virginia
- Cosna River - Alaska
- Cossatot River - Arkansas
- Cosumnes River - California
- Cotley River - Massachusetts
- Cottonwood River - Kansas
- Cottonwood River - Minnesota
- Couderay River - Wisconsin
- Courtois Creek - Missouri
- Cow Creek - Montana
- Cowanesque River - Pennsylvania, New York
- Coweeman River - Washington
- Cowlitz River - Washington
- Cowpasture River - Virginia
- Coyote Creek - California

== Cr - Cu ==
- Crab Creek - Washington
- Cranberry River - Massachusetts
- Cranberry River - West Virginia
- Cranberry River - Wisconsin
- Crawfish River - Wisconsin
- Credit River - Minnesota
- Crooked Creek - Pennsylvania
- Crooked River - Massachusetts
- Crooked River - Missouri
- Crooked River - Oregon
- Cross River - New York
- Croton River - New York
- Crow River - Minnesota
- Crow Wing River - Minnesota
- Crum Creek - Pennsylvania
- Crystal River - Colorado
- Crystal River - Florida
- Crystal River - Michigan
- Crystal River - Wisconsin
- Cuivre River - Missouri
- Cullasaja River - North Carolina
- Cumberland River - Kentucky, Tennessee
- Current River - Missouri, Arkansas
- Cut River (Mackinac) and Cut River (Roscommon) - Michigan
- Cut Bank Creek - Montana
- Cutler River - New Hampshire
- Cuyahoga River - Ohio
- Cuyama River - California
