= Thornapple River (disambiguation) =

The Thornapple River is a river in Michigan.

Thornapple River may also refer to:

- Thornapple River (Wisconsin)

== See also ==
- Little Thornapple River (disambiguation)
- Thornapple (disambiguation)
