= List of rivers of the United States: L =

A - B - C - D - E - F - G - H - I - J - K - L - M - N - O - P - Q - R - S - T - U - V - W - XYZ

This is a list of rivers in the United States that have names starting with the letter L. For the main page, which includes links to listings by state, see List of rivers in the United States.

== L ==
- La Crosse River - Wisconsin
- La Moine River - Illinois
- La Plata River - Colorado, New Mexico
- Lac qui Parle River - Minnesota
- Lackawanna River - Pennsylvania
- Lackawaxen River - Pennsylvania
- Lafayette River - Virginia
- Lagunitas Creek - California
- Lake River - Washington
- Lake Fork Mohican River - Ohio
- Lamar River - Wyoming
- Lamine River - Missouri
- Lamington River - New Jersey
- Lamoille River - Vermont
- Lampasas River - Texas
- Lamprey River - New Hampshire
- Lane River - New Hampshire
- L'Anguille River - Arkansas
- Laramie River - Colorado, Wyoming
- Laughing Whitefish River - Michigan
- Laurel Fork (Cheat River) - West Virginia
- Laurel Fork (Clear Fork Guyandotte River) - West Virginia
- Lavaca River - Texas

== Le ==
- Le Sueur River - Minnesota
- Leading Creek - Ohio
- Leading Creek (Little Kanawha River) - West Virginia
- Leading Creek (Tygart Valley River) - West Virginia
- Leaf River - Illinois
- Leaf River - Minnesota
- Leaf River - Mississippi
- Leatherwood Creek - western Ohio
- Leatherwood Creek - eastern Ohio
- Lees River - Massachusetts
- Left Hand Creek - Colorado
- Lehigh River - Pennsylvania
- Leipsic River - Delaware
- Leland River - Michigan
- Lemhi River - Idaho
- Lemonweir River - Wisconsin
- Lens Creek - West Virginia
- Leon River - Texas
- Lester River - Minnesota
- River Lethe - Alaska
- Levisa Fork River - Virginia, Kentucky
- Lewis River - Washington
- Lewis River - Wyoming
- Lewis and Clark River - Oregon

== Li - Ll ==
- Licking River - Kentucky
- Licking River - Ohio
- Link River - Oregon
- Linville River - North Carolina
- Little River - Alabama
- Little River - California
- Little River - Delaware
- Little River - Florida (Biscayne Bay)
- Little River - Florida (Gadsden County)
- Little River - Indiana
- Little River - Kentucky
- Little River - Louisiana
- Little River - Missouri, Arkansas
- Little River - New Hampshire (multiple)
- Little River - Oklahoma
- Little River - Oklahoma, Arkansas
- Little River - Oregon
- Little River - tributary of Broad River, South Carolina
- Little River - eastern South Carolina
- Little River - Tennessee
- Little River - Texas
- Little River - northern Virginia
- Little River - southwestern Virginia
- Little River - West Virginia
- Little River - Wisconsin
- Little Arkansas River - Kansas
- Little Auglaize River - Ohio
- Little Baraboo River - Wisconsin
- Little Barren River - Kentucky
- Little Bear River - Utah
- Little Beaver Creek - Ohio
- Little Bighorn River - Wyoming, Montana
- Little Birch River - West Virginia
- Little Blackwater River - Maryland
- Little Blackwater River - West Virginia
- Little Blue River - Kansas, Nebraska
- Little Blue River - Missouri
- Little Bluestone River - West Virginia
- Little Boise Brule River - Wisconsin
- Little Buffalo River - Tennessee
- Little Cacapon River - West Virginia
- Little Choctawhatchee River - Alabama
- Little Coal River - West Virginia
- Little Cobb River - Minnesota
- Little Colorado River - Arizona
- Little Conemaugh River - Pennsylvania
- Little Cottonwood River - Minnesota
- Little Cuyahoga River - Ohio
- Little Darby Creek - Ohio
- Little Deschutes River - Oregon
- Little Doe River - Tennessee
- Little Duck River - Tennessee
- Little Eau Pleine River - Wisconsin
- Little Econlockhatchee River - Florida
- Little Emory River - Tennessee
- Little Grant River - Wisconsin
- Little Green River - Wisconsin
- Little Harpeth River - Tennessee
- Little Hocking River - Ohio
- Little Humboldt River - Nevada
- Little Indian River - Michigan
- Little Juniata River - Pennsylvania
- Little Kanawha River - West Virginia
- Little Kentucky River - Kentucky
- Little La Crosse River - Wisconsin
- Little Laramie River - Wyoming
- Little Le Sueur River - Minnesota
- Little Lemonweir River - Wisconsin
- Little Lost River - Idaho
- Little Mackinaw River - Illinois
- Little Magothy River - Maryland
- Little Manatee River - Florida
- Little Manitowoc River - Wisconsin
- Little Maquoketa River - Iowa
- Little Marys River - Illinois
- Little Medicine Bow River - Wyoming
- Little Menominee River - Wisconsin, Illinois
- Little Miami River - Ohio
- Little Minnesota River - South Dakota, Minnesota
- Little Missouri River - Arkansas
- Little Missouri River - Wyoming, North Dakota
- Little Monocacy River - Maryland
- Little Muddy Creek - North Dakota
- Little Muddy River - Illinois
- Little Muskingum River - Ohio
- Little Nestucca River - Oregon
- Little Niangua River - Missouri
- Little Obed River - Tennessee
- Little Ohoopee River - Georgia
- Little Osage River - Kansas, Missouri
- Little Pamet River - Massachusetts
- Little Partridge River - Minnesota
- Little Pee Dee River - South Carolina
- Little Pigeon River - Tennessee
- Little Platte River - Wisconsin
- Little Pokegama River - Wisconsin
- Little Red River - Arkansas, Louisiana
- Little Rib River - Wisconsin
- Little Rock River - Minnesota, Iowa
- Little Salkehatchie River - South Carolina
- Little Sandy River - Kentucky
- Little Sandy River - South Carolina
- Little Schuylkill River - Pennsylvania
- Little Scioto River - Ohio (Ohio River tributary)
- Little Scioto River - Ohio (Scioto River tributary)
- Little Sequatchie River - Tennessee
- Little Sioux River - Iowa
- Little Sioux River - Wisconsin
- Little Snake River - Colorado, Wyoming
- Little Somo River - Wisconsin
- Little Spokane River - Washington
- Little Sugar River - New Hampshire
- Little Sugar River - Wisconsin
- Little Sur River - California
- Little Susitna River - Alaska
- Little Tallapoosa River - Alabama
- Little Tennessee River - Georgia, North Carolina, Tennessee
- Little Thompson River - Colorado
- Little Thornapple River - tributary of the Coldwater River, Michigan
- Little Thornapple River - Eaton County, Michigan
- Little Thornapple River - Sawyer and Rusk counties, Wisconsin
- Little Thornapple River - Sawyer County, Wisconsin
- Little Trappe River - Wisconsin
- Little Truckee River - California
- Little Turtle River - Wisconsin
- Little Vermilion River (Illinois River tributary) - Illinois
- Little Vermilion River (Wabash River tributary) - Illinois, Indiana
- Little Wabash River - Illinois
- Little Walker River - California
- Little Warrior River - Alabama
- Little White River - South Dakota
- Little Wolf River - Wisconsin
- Little Wood River - Idaho
- Little Yellow River - Wisconsin
- Llano River - Texas

== Lo ==
- Lochsa River - Idaho
- Locust Fork of the Black Warrior River - Alabama
- Lodgepole Creek - Wyoming, Nebraska, Colorado
- Logan River - Utah
- Long Prairie River - Minnesota
- Long Tom River - Oregon
- Looking Glass River - Michigan
- Loop Creek - West Virginia
- Loosahatchie River - Tennessee
- Loramie Creek - Ohio
- Los Angeles River - California
- Lost River - California, Oregon
- Lost River - Indiana
- Lost River - New Hampshire
- Lost River - West Virginia
- Lostine River - Oregon
- Los Osos Creek - California
- Loup River - Nebraska
- Loutre River - Missouri
- Lovell River - New Hampshire
- Loxahatchee River - Florida
- Loyalhanna Creek - Pennsylvania
- Loyalsock Creek - Pennsylvania

== Lu - Ly ==
- Luckiamute River - Oregon
- Lumber River - North Carolina
- Lummi River - Washington
- Lycoming Creek - Pennsylvania
- Lynches River - North Carolina, South Carolina
- Lynnhaven River - Virginia
- Lyre River - Washington
