= Indian River (Michigan) =

Indian River is the name of two rivers in the U.S. state of Michigan:

- Indian River (Manistique River), in Alger and Schoolcraft counties in the Upper Peninsula
- Indian River (Mullett Lake), in Cheboygan County in the Lower Peninsula

== See also ==
- Indian River, Michigan, an unincorporated community in Cheboygan County
- Little Indian River (Michigan), a tributary of Indian River in the Upper Peninsula
