= Thornapple =

Thornapple may refer to:

== Plants ==
- Datura species
- Crataegus species
- Solanum incanum

== Places in the US ==
- Thornapple Township, Michigan
- Thornapple, Wisconsin, a town
  - Thornapple (community), Wisconsin, an unincorporated community
- Thornapple River, Michigan
- Thornapple River (Wisconsin)
- Thornapple Trail, Michigan

== Other uses ==
- Brutus P. Thornapple, the main character in the comic strip The Born Loser
- Thornapple (band), South Korean rock band

== See also ==
- Little Thornapple River (disambiguation)
