= Haigler =

Haigler can refer to:

== People ==
- Christina Haigler, American figure skater
- Ron Haigler, American basketball player

== Places ==
- Haigler, Nebraska
- Haigler Creek, a creek in Arizona
