= Semen (disambiguation) =

Semen is a reproductive biofluid of male or hermaphroditic animals.

Semen may also refer to:

- Semen (wasp), a wasp genus in the subfamily Encyrtinae
- Semen, the Indonesian word for cement
  - Semen Gresik, the largest cement producing company in Indonesia
  - Semen Padang, the oldest cement producing company in Indonesia
    - Semen Padang FC, the football club owned by the company
- Semen (name):
  - Semen or Xemen, a medieval Basque and neighbour given name
  - a popular Ukrainian given name (Семен)
  - a romanization of Russian given names Семён (Semyon) or Симон (Simon)
- Semen Korsakov

== See also ==
- Seamen, the plural of seaman
- Semem Creek
- Semens, a commune in the Gironde department in southwestern France
- Siemens, German industrial and technology conglomerate
