= List of rivers of the United States: H =

A - B - C - D - E - F - G - H - I - J - K - L - M - N - O - P - Q - R - S - T - U - V - W - XYZ

This is a list of rivers in the United States that have names starting with the letter H. For the main page, which includes links to listings by state, see List of rivers in the United States.

== Ha ==
- Hackensack River - New York, New Jersey
- Hackers Creek - West Virginia
- Haigler Creek - Arizona
- Halifax River - Florida
- Halls Stream - New Hampshire
- Ham Branch - New Hampshire
- Hamma Hamma River - Washington
- Hammonasset River - Connecticut
- Hampton River - New Hampshire
- Hampton River - Virginia
- Hampton Falls River - New Hampshire
- Hanalei River - Hawaii
- Hardware River - Virginia
- Harbor River - South Carolina
- Harlem River - New York
- Harpeth River - Tennessee
- Hassayampa River - Arizona
- Hatchie River - Mississippi, Tennessee
- Haw River - North Carolina
- Hawlings River - Maryland
- Hay River - Wisconsin
- Hazel River - Virginia

== He - Hi ==
- Heart River - North Dakota
- Henry Fork - West Virginia
- Henrys Fork - Idaho
- Hillsborough River - Florida
- Hiwassee River - Georgia, North Carolina, Tennessee

== Ho ==
- Hockanum River - Connecticut
- Hocking River - Ohio
- Hockomock River - Massachusetts
- Hogatza River - Alaska
- Hoh River - Washington
- Holitna River - Alaska
- Holly River - West Virginia
- Holston River - Virginia, Tennessee
- Homochitto River - Mississippi
- Hood River - Oregon
- Hoosic River - Massachusetts, Vermont, New York
- Hop River - Connecticut
- Horsepasture River - North Carolina
- Horton Creek - Arizona
- Housatonic River - Connecticut & Massachusetts
- Houston River-New York

== Hu - Hy ==
- Hudson River - New York
- Huerfano River - Colorado
- Huff Creek - West Virginia
- Huff Run - Ohio
- Hughes River - Virginia
- Hughes River - West Virginia
- Humboldt River - Nevada
- Humptulips River - Washington
- Hungry River - North Carolina
- Hunt River - Rhode Island
- Huron River - Michigan
- Huron River - Ohio
- Hurricane Creek - Alabama
- Huslia River - Alaska
- Hutchinson River - New York
- Hyco River - North Carolina, Virginia
