= List of rivers of the United States: W =

A – B – C – D – E – F – G – H – I – J – K – L – M – N – O – P – Q – R – S – T – U – V – W – XYZ

This is a list of rivers in the United States that have names starting with the letter W. For the main page, which includes links to listings by state, see List of rivers in the United States.

== Wa ==
- Wabash River – Ohio, Indiana, Illinois
- Waccamaw River – North Carolina, South Carolina
- Waccasassa River – Florida
- Wacissa River – Florida
- Wading River – Massachusetts
- Wading River – New Jersey
- Wailua River – Hawaii
- Wailuku River – Hawaii
- Waimea River – Hawaii
- Waits River – Vermont
- Wakarusa River – Kansas
- Wakatomika Creek – Ohio
- Wakulla River – Florida
- Walhonding River – Ohio
- Walker Creek – California
- Walker Creek – Michigan
- Walker Creek – Virginia
- Walker Creek – West Virginia
- Walker River – Nevada
- Walla Walla River – Washington
- Wallkill River – New Jersey, New York
- Walloomsac River – Vermont, New York
- Wallooskee River – Oregon
- Wallowa River – Oregon
- Walnut River – Kansas
- Wanaque River – New Jersey
- Wando River – South Carolina
- Wankinco River – Massachusetts
- Wappinger Creek – New York
- Wapsipinicon River – Iowa
- Ware River – Massachusetts
- Warm Springs River – Oregon
- Warner River – New Hampshire
- Warren River – Rhode Island
- Warwick River – Virginia
- Washita River – Texas, Oklahoma
- Washougal River – Washington
- Watab River – Minnesota
- Watauga River – North Carolina, Tennessee
- Wateree River – South Carolina
- Watonwan River – Minnesota
- Waupaca River – Wisconsin
- Waxahatchee Creek – Alabama

== We ==
- Weber River – Utah
- Webhannet River – Maine
- Weeki Wachee River – Florida
- Weiser River – Idaho
- Wekiva River – Florida
- Wells River – Vermont
- Wenatchee River – Washington
- West River – Connecticut
- West River – Maryland
- West River – Massachusetts
- West River – Rhode Island
- West River – Vermont
- West Branch – New Hampshire
- West Branch Delaware River – New York, Pennsylvania
- West Branch Susquehanna River – Pennsylvania
- West Branch Wading River – New Jersey
- West Fork River – West Virginia
- West Fork of the Little Sioux River – Iowa
- West Nishnabotna River – Iowa
- West Okaw River – Illinois
- West Twin River – Wisconsin
- West Walker River – California, Nevada
- Westfield River – Massachusetts
- Westport River – Massachusetts
- Weweantic River – Massachusetts
- Weymouth Back River – Massachusetts
- Weymouth Fore River – Massachusetts

== Wh ==
- Wheeling Creek – Ohio
- Wheeling Creek – West Virginia
- Whetstone River – South Dakota, Minnesota
- Whippany River – New Jersey
- White River – Arkansas, Missouri
- White River – Indiana
- White River – Western Michigan
- White River – The Thumb of Michigan
- White River – Nevada
- White River – Oregon
- White River – South Dakota, Nebraska
- White River – Colorado, Utah
- White River – Utah
- White River – Vermont
- White River (Puyallup River) – Washington
- White River (Lake Wenatchee) – Washington
- White River – Wisconsin (Bad River tributary)
- White River – Wisconsin (Fox River tributary)
- White Chuck River – Washington
- White Clay Creek – Pennsylvania, Delaware
- White Earth River – Minnesota
- White Earth River – North Dakota
- White Oak Bayou – Texas
- White Oak River – North Carolina
- White Rock Creek – Texas
- White Salmon River – Washington
- Whiteface River – Minnesota
- Whiteface River – New Hampshire
- Whitefish River – Michigan
- Whitefish River – Montana
- Whitewater River – California
- Whitewater River – Indiana, Ohio
- Whitewater River – Kansas
- Whitewater River – Minnesota
- Whitewater River – North Carolina, South Carolina

== Wi ==
- Wichita River – Texas
- Wicomico River – Maryland (Chesapeake Bay)
- Wicomico River – Maryland (Potomac River)
- Wild River – New Hampshire and Maine
- Wild Ammonoosuc River – New Hampshire
- Wild Rice River – Minnesota
- Wild Rice River – North Dakota
- Wilde River – Massachusetts
- Willamette River – Oregon
- Willapa River – Washington
- Williams Fork (Colorado River) – Colorado
- Williams Fork (Yampa River) – Colorado
- Williams River – Vermont
- Williams River – West Virginia
- Williamson River – Oregon
- Willimantic River – Connecticut
- Willis River – Virginia
- Willow Creek – Colorado
- Willow Creek – Montana
- Willow River – Minnesota, tributary of Kettle River
- Willow River – Minnesota, tributary of Mississippi River
- Willow River – Wisconsin (St. Croix River tributary)
- Willow River – Wisconsin (Tomahawk River tributary)
- Wills Creek – Ohio
- Wills Creek – Pennsylvania, Maryland
- Wilson River – Oregon
- Wind River – Alaska
- Wind River – Wisconsin
- Wind River – Washington
- Wind River – Wyoming
- Wing River – Minnesota
- Winnebago River – Iowa
- Winnetuxet River – Massachusetts
- Winnicut River – New Hampshire
- Winnipesaukee River – New Hampshire
- Winooski River – Vermont
- Wisconsin River – Wisconsin
- Wise River – Montana
- Wishkah River – Washington
- Wissahickon Creek – Pennsylvania
- Witcher Creek – West Virginia
- Withlacoochee River – southern Florida
- Withlacoochee River – Georgia and northern Florida

== Wo – Wy ==
- Wolf Creek (Great Miami River) – Ohio
- Wolf Creek (Muskingum River) – Ohio
- Wolf River – Kansas
- Wolf River – Mississippi, Tennessee
- Wolf River – Tennessee, Kentucky
- Wolf River – Wisconsin (Eau Claire River tributary)
- Wolf River – Wisconsin (Fox River tributary)
- Wonalancet River – New Hampshire
- Wood River – Illinois
- Wood River – Oregon
- Wood River – Connecticut, Rhode Island
- Wood River – Wisconsin
- Woonasquatucket River – Rhode Island
- Worthington Creek – West Virginia
- Wounded Knee Creek – South Dakota
- Wulik River – Alaska
- Wye River – Maryland
- Wynoochee River – Washington
