= List of rivers of the United States: M =

A - B - C - D - E - F - G - H - I - J - K - L - M - N - O - P - Q - R - S - T - U - V - W - XYZ

This is a list of rivers in the United States that have names starting with the letter M. For the main page, which includes links to listings by state, see List of rivers in the United States.

== Ma ==
- Macatawa River - Michigan
- Machias River - Eastern Maine
- Machias River (Aroostook River) - Northern Maine
- Mackinaw River - Illinois
- Macoupin Creek - Illinois
- Mad River - California
- Mad River - Maine
- Mad River - Eastern New Hampshire
- Mad River - Central New Hampshire
- Mad River - Ohio
- Mad River - Vermont
- Mad River - Washington
- Madison River - Wyoming, Montana
- Magalloway River - Maine, New Hampshire
- Magothy River - Maryland
- Mahoning River - Ohio, Pennsylvania
- Maidford River - Rhode Island
- Maiford River - Rhode Island
- Malad River - Idaho
- Malad River - Idaho and Utah
- Malden River - Massachusetts
- Malheur River - Oregon
- Manasquan River - New Jersey
- Manatee River - Florida
- Manhan River - Massachusetts
- Manistee River - Michigan
- Manistique River - Michigan
- Manitowish River - Wisconsin
- Manitowoc River - Wisconsin
- Manumuskin River - New Jersey
- Mapes Creek - Washington
- Maple River - Iowa
- Maple River - Minnesota
- Maple River - North Dakota
- Maquoketa River - Iowa
- Marais des Cygnes River - Kansas, Missouri
- Marengo River - Wisconsin
- Marias River - Montana
- Marion River - New York
- Marmaton River - Kansas, Missouri
- Martin River - Alaska
- Marys River - Illinois
- Marys River - Oregon
- Mascoma River - New Hampshire
- Mashpee River - Massachusetts
- Maskerchugg River - Rhode Island
- Mat River - Virginia
- Matanuska River - Alaska
- Matanzas River - Florida
- Matfield River - Massachusetts
- Matta River - Virginia
- Mattapoisett River - Massachusetts
- Mattaponi River - Virginia
- Mattatuxet River - Rhode Island
- Mattole River - California
- Maumee River - Indiana, Ohio
- Maunesha River - Wisconsin
- Maurice River - New Jersey
- Maury River - Virginia
- Mayo River - Virginia, North Carolina
- Mazon River - Illinois

== Mc ==
- McCloud River - California
- McElroy Creek - West Virginia
- McKenzie River - Oregon
- McKim Creek - West Virginia
- McNeil River - Alaska

== Me ==
- Meade River - Alaska
- Meadow Creek - California
- Meadow River - West Virginia
- Meadow Valley Wash - Nevada
- Meathouse Fork - West Virginia
- Mecan River - Wisconsin
- Mechums River - Virginia
- Medicine Bow River - Colorado, Wyoming
- Medicine Lodge River - Kansas, Oklahoma
- Medina River - Texas
- Meduxnekeag River - Maine
- Meeme River - Wisconsin
- Meherrin River - Virginia, North Carolina
- Melozitna River - Alaska
- Melvin River - New Hampshire
- Mendenhall River - Alaska
- Menominee River - Michigan, Wisconsin
- Menominee River - Wisconsin, Illinois
- Menomonee River - Wisconsin
- Meramec River - Missouri
- Merced River - California
- Merrimack River - Massachusetts, New Hampshire
- Merrymeeting River - New Hampshire
- Meshik River - Alaska
- Metedeconk River - New Jersey
- Methow River - Washington
- Metolius River - Oregon
- Mettawee River - Vermont, New York

== Mi ==
- Miami River - Florida
- Miami River - New York
- Miami River - Oregon
- Mianus River - Connecticut, New York
- Michigan River - Colorado
- Middle Branch Piscataquog River - New Hampshire
- Middle River - Iowa
- Middle River - Minnesota
- Middle River - Wisconsin
- Middle Fork River - West Virginia
- Middle Fork John Day River - Oregon
- Middle Fork Kentucky River - Kentucky
- Middle Fork Salmon River - Idaho
- Middle Fork South Platte River - California
- Middle Fork Vermilion River - Illinois
- Middle Fork Willamette River - Oregon
- Middle Island Creek - West Virginia
- Middle Santiam River - Oregon
- Miles River - Maryland
- Milk River (Alberta–Montana) - Montana
- Mill Creek - southern California
- Mill Creek - Tehama County, California
- Mill Creek - Ohio
- Mill Creek - West Virginia
- Mill River - Connecticut
- Mill River (Northampton, Massachusetts) - western Massachusetts
- Mill River (Massachusetts – Rhode Island) - Massachusetts, Rhode Island
- Mill River (Taunton River) - southeastern Massachusetts
- Millers River - New Hampshire, Massachusetts
- Millers River - Rhode Island
- Mills River - North Carolina
- Millstone River - New Jersey
- Milwaukee River - Wisconsin
- Mimbres River - New Mexico
- Minam River - Oregon
- Mineral River - Michigan
- Mink River - Wisconsin
- Minnehaha Creek - Minnesota
- Minnesota River - Minnesota
- Mishnock River - Rhode Island
- Mispillion River - Delaware
- Mission River - Texas
- Missisquoi River - Vermont
- Mississinewa River - Indiana
- Mississippi River - Minnesota, Wisconsin, Iowa, Illinois, Missouri, Kentucky, Tennessee, Arkansas, Mississippi, Louisiana
- Missouri River - Montana, North Dakota, South Dakota, Nebraska, Iowa, Kansas, Missouri
- Misteguay Creek - Michigan
- Mitchell River - Massachusetts
- Mitchell River - North Carolina
- Mitchigan River - Michigan

== Mo ==
- Mobile River - Alabama
- Mohawk River - New Hampshire
- Mohawk River - New York
- Mohawk River - Oregon
- Mohican River - Ohio
- Mohlendorph Creek - Washington
- Mojave River - California
- Mokelumne River - California
- Molalla River - Oregon
- Monatiquot River - Massachusetts
- Monday Creek - Ohio
- Monocacy River - Maryland
- Monongahela River - West Virginia, Pennsylvania
- Montello River - Wisconsin
- Montreal River - Michigan Keweenaw Peninsula
- Montreal River - Michigan-Wisconsin border
- Moormans River - Virginia
- Moose River - New Hampshire
- Moose River - New York
- Moose River - Wisconsin
- Moosup River - Rhode Island, Connecticut
- Moreau River - South Dakota
- Moshassuck River - Rhode Island
- Mosquito Creek - Iowa
- Moswansicut River - Rhode Island
- Mount Hope River - Connecticut
- Mountain Fork - Arkansas, Oklahoma
- Mousam River - Maine
- Mowich River - Washington
- Moxahala Creek - Ohio
- Moyie River - Idaho, British Columbia

== Mu ==
- Muckalee Creek - Georgia
- Mud River - Kentucky
- Mud River - West Virginia
- Muddy Creek - Colorado
- Muddy Creek - Utah
- Muddy River - Nevada
- Mukwonago River - Wisconsin
- Mulberry Creek - Alabama
- Mulberry Fork of the Black Warrior River - Alabama
- Mulberry River - Arkansas
- Mulchatna River - Alaska
- Mullet River - Wisconsin
- Mullica River - New Jersey
- Mumford River - Massachusetts
- Muncy Creek - Pennsylvania
- Murderkill River - Delaware
- Muscatatuck River - Indiana
- Musconetcong River - New Jersey
- Muskegon River - Michigan
- Muskingum River - Ohio
- Musselshell River - Montana
- Mustinka River - Minnesota

== My ==
- Myakka River - Florida
- Mystic River - Connecticut
- Mystic River - Massachusetts
