= Little Indian River =

Little Indian River may refer to:

- Little Indian River (Alaska), a tributary in the Yukon River system
- Little Indian River (Michigan)
