= List of rivers of the United States: R =

A - B - C - D - E - F - G - H - I - J - K - L - M - N - O - P - Q - R - S - T - U - V - W - XYZ

This is a list of rivers in the United States that have names starting with the letter R. For the main page, which includes links to listings by state, see List of rivers in the United States.

== Ra ==
- Rabbit River - Michigan
- Rabbit River - Minnesota, tributary of Bois de Sioux River
- Rabbit River - Minnesota, tributary of Mississippi River
- Raccoon Creek - New Jersey
- Raccoon Creek - Beaver County, Pennsylvania
- Raccoon Creek - Erie County, Pennsylvania
- Raccoon River - Iowa
- Raft River - Utah, Idaho
- Raging River - Washington
- Rahway River - New Jersey
- Rainbow River - Florida
- Rainy River - Minnesota
- Ramapo River - New York, New Jersey
- Rancocas Creek - New Jersey
- Rangeley River - Maine
- Rapid Creek - South Dakota
- Rapid River - Maine
- Rapid River - Delta County, Michigan (Upper Peninsula)
- Rapid River - Kalkaska County, Michigan (Lower Peninsula)
- Rapid River - Ontonagon County, Michigan (Upper Peninsula)
- Rapidan River - Virginia
- Rappahannock River - Virginia
- Raquette River - New York
- Raritan River - New Jersey
- Raspberry River - Wisconsin
- Rattle River - New Hampshire
- Rattlesnake Creek - Ohio
- Rattlesnake River - New Hampshire
- Raystown Branch Juniata River - Pennsylvania

== Re - Rh ==
- Red River - Kentucky
- Red River - Minnesota, Wisconsin
- Red River - Tennessee, Kentucky
- Red River - Texas, Oklahoma, Arkansas, Louisiana
- Red River - Wisconsin (tributary of Lake Michigan)
- Red River - Wisconsin (tributary of Wolf River)
- Red River of the North - Minnesota, North Dakota
- Red Bird River - Kentucky
- Red Cedar River - Michigan
- Red Cedar River - Wisconsin
- Red Clay Creek - Delaware
- Red Hill River - New Hampshire
- Red Lake River - Minnesota
- Red Rock River - Montana
- Redbank Creek - Pennsylvania
- Reddies River - North Carolina
- Redeye River - Minnesota
- Redwater River - Montana
- Redwood River - Minnesota
- Reedy Creek - West Virginia
- Reedy River - South Carolina
- Reese River - Nevada
- Republican River - Colorado, Nebraska, Kansas
- Rhode River - Maryland

== Ri ==
- Ribault River - Florida
- Rice Creek - Minnesota
- Rice Fork - California
- Richmond Creek - New York
- Rio Chama - Colorado, New Mexico
- Rio Grande - Colorado, New Mexico, Texas
- Rio Hondo - California
- Rio Puerco - New Mexico
- Rio Ruidoso - New Mexico
- Rivanna River - Virginia
- River des Peres - Missouri
- River Raisin - Michigan
- River Rouge - Michigan

== Ro ==
- Roanoke River - Virginia, North Carolina
- Roaring River - Missouri
- Roaring River - North Carolina
- Roaring River - Tennessee
- Roaring Fork River - Colorado
- Robinson River - Virginia
- Rock Creek - Maryland, District of Columbia
- Rock Creek (Clear Creek) - Wyoming
- Rock Creek (Medicine Bow River) - Wyoming
- Rock River - Illinois, Wisconsin
- Rock River - Minnesota, Iowa
- Rock River - Vermont (northern)
- Rock River - Vermont (southern)
- Rockaway River - New Jersey
- Rockcastle River - Kentucky
- Rockfish River - Virginia
- Rocky Branch - New Hampshire
- Rocky River - Alaska
- Rocky River - Connecticut
- Rocky River - Michigan
- Rocky River - Ohio
- Rocky River - South Carolina
- Rocky River - Tennessee
- Roe River - Montana
- Roger Island River - Massachusetts
- Rogue River - Michigan
- Rogue River - Oregon
- Rolling Fork - Arkansas
- Rolling Fork Salt River - Kentucky
- Rondout Creek - New York
- Rooster River - Connecticut
- Root River - Minnesota
- Root River - Wisconsin (tributary of Des Plaines River)
- Root River - Wisconsin (tributary of Lake Michigan)
- Roseau River - Minnesota
- Rough River - Kentucky
- Row River - Oregon
- Rowley River - Massachusetts
- Royal River - Maine

== Ru ==
- Rubicon River - California
- Rubicon River - Wisconsin
- Ruby River - Montana
- Rio Ruidoso - New Mexico
- Rum River - Minnesota
- Rumford River - Massachusetts
- Runnins River - Massachusetts, Rhode Island
- Rush River - Minnesota
- Rush River - Wisconsin
- Russian River - Alaska
- Russian River - California
