= List of rivers of the United States: I =

A - B - C - D - E - F - G - H - I - J - K - L - M - N - O - P - Q - R - S - T - U - V - W - XYZ

This is a list of rivers in the United States that have names starting with the letter I. For the main page, which includes links to listings by state, see List of rivers in the United States.

== I ==
- Ichawaynochaway Creek - Georgia
- Ichetucknee River - Florida
- Iditarod River - Alaska
- Igushik River - Alaska
- Illinois River - Arkansas, Oklahoma
- Illinois River - Colorado
- Illinois River - Illinois
- Illinois River - Oregon
- Imnaha River - Oregon
- Imperial River - Florida
- Independence River - New York
- Indian Creek - West Virginia (Guyandotte River tributary)
- Indian Creek - West Virginia (Middle Island Creek tributary)
- Indian Creek - West Virginia (New River tributary)
- Indian Head River - Massachusetts
- Indian River - Alaska
- Indian River - Delaware
- Indian River - Florida
- Indian River - Lower Peninsula Michigan
- Indian River - Upper Peninsula Michigan
- Indian River - New Hampshire
- Indian River - South Dakota, a minor tributary of the Big Sioux River
- Indian River - Virginia
- Indian Stream - New Hampshire
- Innoko River - Alaska
- Iowa River - Iowa
- Ipswich River - Massachusetts
- Iron River (disambiguation) - Michigan
- Iron River - Wisconsin (Bad River tributary)
- Iron River - Wisconsin (Lake Superior tributary)
- Iroquois River - Indiana, Illinois
- Isabella River - Minnesota
- Isinglass River - New Hampshire
- Island Bayou - Oklahoma
- Island Creek - West Virginia
- Island River - Minnesota
- Israel River - New Hampshire
- Itkillik River - Alaska
- Ivishak River - Alaska
- Izavieknik River - Alaska
