= List of rivers of the United States: F =

A - B - C - D - E - F - G - H - I - J - K - L - M - N - O - P - Q - R - S - T - U - V - W - XYZ

This is a list of rivers in the United States that have names starting with the letter F. For the main page, which includes links to listings by state, see List of rivers in the United States.

== Fa - Fe ==
- Fabius River - Missouri
- Fall River - Kansas
- Falling Water River - Tennessee
- Falls River - Connecticut
- Falls River - Michigan
- Farmington River - Massachusetts, Connecticut
- Fawn River - Indiana, Michigan
- Feather River - California

== Fi ==
- Firehole River - Wyoming
- Firesteel River - Michigan
- First River - New Jersey
- First Broad River - North Carolina
- Fish River - Alabama
- Fish River - Alaska
- Fish Hook River - Minnesota
- Fisher River - Montana
- Fisher River - North Carolina
- Five Mile River - Massachusetts
- Fishing River - Missouri

== Fl ==
- Flag River - Wisconsin
- Flambeau River - Wisconsin
- Flat River - Michigan
- Flat River - North Carolina
- Flat River - Rhode Island (tributary of the South Branch Pawtuxet River)
- Flat River - Rhode Island (tributary of the Wood River)
- Flathead River - Montana
- Flatrock Creek - Indiana, Ohio
- Flatrock River - Indiana
- Flint River - Alabama, Tennessee
- Flint River - Georgia
- Flint River - Michigan
- Flint Run - West Virginia
- Floyd River - Iowa
- Floyds Fork - Kentucky (Floyds Fork of the Salt River)
- Flushing River - New York

== Fo ==
- Fond du Lac River - Wisconsin
- Fore River - Maine
- Forest River - North Dakota
- Forge River - Massachusetts
- Fork River - California
- Forked Deer River - Tennessee
- Fortymile River - Alaska
- Fossil Creek - Arizona
- Fourche River - Arkansas
- Fourche La Fave River - Arkansas
- Fourche Maline - Oklahoma
- Fourteen Mile Creek - Indiana
- Fowl River - Alabama
- Fowler River - New Hampshire
- Fox River - Southern Illinois
- Fox River - Wisconsin, Northern Illinois
- Fox River - Wisconsin

== Fr ==
- Frankstown Branch Juniata River - Pennsylvania
- Fraser River - Colorado
- Frazier Brook - New Hampshire
- Fremont River - Utah
- French Creek - New York, Pennsylvania
- French Creek - South Dakota
- French River - Massachusetts, Connecticut
- French Broad River - North Carolina, Tennessee
- Fresh Kills - New York
- Fresh River - New Hampshire
- Fresno River - California
- Frio River - Texas
- Fryingpan River - Colorado
