= List of rivers of the United States: K =

A - B - C - D - E - F - G - H - I - J - K - L - M - N - O - P - Q - R - S - T - U - V - W - XYZ

This is a list of rivers in the United States that have names starting with the letter K. For the main page, which includes links to listings by state, see List of rivers in the United States.

== Ka ==
- Kachess River - Washington
- Kakagon River - Wisconsin
- Kakhonak River - Alaska
- Kalama River - Washington
- Kalamazoo River - Michigan
- Kanab Creek - Arizona
- Kanawha River - West Virginia
- Kanektok River - Alaska
- Kankakee River - Indiana, Illinois
- Kansas River - Kansas
- Kantishna River - Alaska
- Karluk River - Alaska
- Kasilof River - Alaska
- Kaskaskia River - Illinois
- Kaukonahua River - Hawaii
- Kaweah River - California
- Kayaderosseras Creek - New York

== Ke ==
- Kellys Creek - West Virginia
- Kenai River - Alaska
- Kenduskeag Stream - Maine
- Kennebec River - Maine
- Kennebunk River - Maine
- Kentucky River - Kentucky
- Keowee River - South Carolina
- Kern River - California
- Kettle River - Minnesota, tributary of St. Croix River
- Kettle River - Minnesota, tributary of Blueberry River
- Kettle River - Washington
- Kewaunee River - Wisconsin
- Keya Paha River - South Dakota, Nebraska

== Ki ==
- Kiamichi River - Oklahoma
- Kickapoo River - Wisconsin
- Kickemuit River - Massachusetts, Rhode Island
- Kilchis River - Oregon
- Killbuck Creek - Ohio
- Killik River - Alaska
- Killsnake River - Wisconsin
- Kinchafoonee Creek - Georgia
- King Salmon River (Admiralty Island) - Alaska
- King Salmon River (Egegik River) - Alaska
- King Salmon River (Nushagak River) - Alaska
- King Salmon River (Ugashik River) - Alaska
- Kings River - California
- Kings River - Nevada
- Kinnickinnic River - Wisconsin (Lake Michigan tributary)
- Kinnickinnic River - Wisconsin (St. Croix River tributary)
- Kinzua Creek - Pennsylvania
- Kishwaukee River - Illinois
- Kiskiminetas River - Pennsylvania
- Kissimmee River - Florida
- Kivalina River - Alaska
- Kiwalik River - Alaska

== Kl - Kn ==
- Klamath River - Oregon, California
- Klaskanine River - Oregon
- Klehini River - Alaska
- Klickitat River - Washington
- Klutina River - Alaska
- Knife River - Minnesota
- Knife River - North Dakota
- Knik River - Alaska
- Knox River - New Hampshire

== Ko ==
- Kobuk River - Alaska
- Kohlsville River - Wisconsin
- Kokolik River - Alaska
- Kokosing River - Ohio
- Kongakut River - Alaska
- Konkapot River - Massachusetts, Connecticut
- Kootenai River - Montana
- Koyuk River - Alaska
- Koyukuk River - Alaska

== Ku - Ky ==
- Kugruk River - Alaska
- Kuk River - Alaska
- Kukpowruk River - Alaska
- Kukpuk River - Alaska
- Kuparuk River - Alaska
- Kuskokwim River - Alaska
- Kuzitrin River - Alaska
- Kvichak River - Alaska
- Kyte River - Illinois
