= List of rivers of the United States: T =

A - B - C - D - E - F - G - H - I - J - K - L - M - N - O - P - Q - R - S - T - U - V - W - XYZ

This is a list of rivers in the United States that have names starting with the letter T. For the main page, which includes links to listings by state, see List of rivers in the United States.

== Ta - Tc ==
- Ta River - Virginia
- Tacoosh River - Michigan
- Tahquamenon River - Michigan
- Taiya River - Alaska
- Taku River - Alaska
- Talachulitna River - Alaska
- Talkeetna River - Alaska
- Tallahatchie River - Mississippi
- Tallapoosa River - Georgia, Alabama
- Tallulah River - North Carolina, Georgia
- Tanana River - Alaska
- Tangipahoa River - Mississippi, Louisiana
- Tar River - North Carolina
- Tarbell Brook - New Hampshire, Massachusetts
- Taunton River - Massachusetts
- Taylor River - New Hampshire
- Tazlina River - Alaska
- Tchefuncte River - Louisiana
- Tchoutacabouffa River - Mississippi

== Te ==
- Teal River - Wisconsin
- Teanaway River - Washington
- Teklanika River - Alaska
- Tellico River - North Carolina, Tennessee
- Ten Mile River - Connecticut, New York
- Ten Mile River - Massachusetts, Rhode Island
- Tenmile Creek - West Virginia
- Tennessee River - Tennessee, Alabama, Kentucky
- Tensas River - Louisiana
- Tensaw River - Alabama
- Teton River - Montana
- Teton River - Wyoming, Idaho

== Th ==
- Thames River - Connecticut
- The Branch - New Hampshire
- Thief River - Minnesota
- Third River - New Jersey
- Thompson River - Montana
- Thornapple River - Michigan
- Thornapple River - Wisconsin
- Thornton Creek - Washington
- Three Mile River - Massachusetts
- Thunder River - Arizona
- Thunder Bay River - Michigan

== Ti ==
- Tiasquam River - Massachusetts
- Tickfaw River - Louisiana, Mississippi
- Tieton River - Washington
- Tiffin River - Michigan, Ohio
- Tijuana River - California
- Tikchik River - Alaska
- Tillamook River - Oregon
- Tilton River - Washington
- Tinayguk River - Alaska
- Tinkers Creek - Ohio
- Tlikakila River - Alaska
- Tioga River - New Hampshire
- Tioga River - Pennsylvania, New York
- Tionesta Creek - Pennsylvania
- Tioughnioga River - New York
- Tippecanoe River - Indiana
- Tittabawassee River - Michigan

== To ==
- Tobacco Garden Creek - North Dakota
- Toccoa River - Georgia
- Togiak River - Alaska
- Tohickon Creek - Pennsylvania
- Tolt River - Washington
- Tomahawk River - Wisconsin
- Tombigbee River - Mississippi, Alabama
- Tomoka River - Florida
- Tomorrow River - Wisconsin
- Toms Fork - West Virginia
- Toms River - New Jersey
- Tonawanda Creek - New York
- Tongue River - Montana, Wyoming
- Tongue River - North Dakota
- Tonto Creek - Arizona
- Totagatic River - Wisconsin
- Touchet River - Washington
- Toussaint River (Ohio) - Ohio
- Toutle River - Washington
- Town River - Massachusetts
- Toxaway River - North Carolina, South Carolina

== Tr - Ts ==
- Trade River - Wisconsin
- Tradewater River - Kentucky
- Trappe River - Wisconsin
- Trask River - Oregon
- Trempealeau River - Wisconsin
- Trimbelle River - Wisconsin
- Trinity River - California
- Trinity River - Texas
- Trout River - Florida
- Trout River - Iowa
- Trout River - Wisconsin
- Truckee River - California, Nevada
- Tsirku River - Alaska

== Tu - Ty ==
- Tualatin River - Oregon
- Tubutulik River - Alaska
- Tucannon River - Washington
- Tuckahoe River - New Jersey
- Tuckasegee River - North Carolina
- Tug Fork of the Big Sandy River - Virginia, West Virginia, Kentucky
- Tugaloo River - Georgia, South Carolina
- Tule River - California
- Tulpehocken Creek - Pennsylvania
- Tuolumne River - California
- Turkey River - Iowa
- Turkey River - New Hampshire
- Turtle River - North Dakota
- Turtle River - Wisconsin
- Tuscarawas River - Ohio
- Tuscumbia River - Mississippi, Tennessee
- Tutakoke River - Alaska
- Twelvepole Creek - West Virginia
- Twisp River - Washington
- Two Hearted River - Michigan
- Two Medicine River - Montana
- Twomile Creek - West Virginia
- Tygart Creek - West Virginia
- Tygart Valley River - West Virginia
- Tygarts Creek - Kentucky
- Tyger River - South Carolina
- Tyronza River - Arkansas
