= Little Thornapple River =

Little Thornapple River may refer to:

Two rivers in Michigan, both part of the Thornapple River system

- Little Thornapple River (Coldwater River)
- Little Thornapple River (Eaton County)

Two rivers in Wisconsin, both tributaries of the Thornapple River

- Little Thornapple River (Rusk County), rises in Sawyer County but mostly in Rusk
- Little Thornapple River (Sawyer County), entirely in Sawyer County

== See also ==
- Thornapple River (disambiguation)
