= List of rivers of the United States: D =

A - B - C - D - E - F - G - H - I - J - K - L - M - N - O - P - Q - R - S - T - U - V - W - XYZ

This is a list of rivers in the United States that have names starting with the letter D. For the main page, which includes links to listings by state, see List of rivers in the United States.

== D - Da ==
- D River - Oregon
- Damariscotta River - Maine
- Dan River - Virginia, North Carolina
- Dan Hole River - New Hampshire
- Davis Creek - West Virginia
- Days River - Michigan

== De - Di ==
- Dead River - several in Florida
- Dead River - Maine
- Dead River - New Hampshire
- Dead River - New Jersey
- Dead Diamond River - New Hampshire
- Dead Moose River - Minnesota
- Dearborn River - Montana
- Deep River - North Carolina
- Deep Fork River - Oklahoma
- Deer River - Michigan
- Deer River - New Hampshire
- Deerfield River - Vermont, Massachusetts
- Deerskin River - Wisconsin
- Delaware River - New York, New Jersey, Pennsylvania, Delaware
- Delaware River - Kansas
- Delta River - Alaska
- Des Lacs River - North Dakota
- Des Moines River - Minnesota, Iowa
- Des Plaines River - Wisconsin, Illinois
- Deschutes River - Oregon
- Deschutes River - Washington
- Deshka River - Alaska
- Detroit River - Michigan
- Devils River - Michigan
- Devils River - Texas
- Devils River - Wisconsin
- Dillons Run - West Virginia
- Dirty Devil River - Utah
- Dix River - Kentucky

== Do - Dr ==
- Doe River - Tennessee
- Dog River - Alabama
- Dog River - Oregon
- Dog Salmon River - Alaska
- Dolores River - Colorado, Utah
- Donner und Blitzen River - Oregon
- Dosewallips River - Washington
- Dowagiac River - Michigan
- Doyles River - Virginia
- Draanjik River - Alaska
- Drakes River - New Hampshire
- Driftwood River - Indiana
- Dry Fork of the Cheat River - West Virginia
- Dry Fork of the Tug Fork - West Virginia, Virginia
- Dry River - New Hampshire
- Dry Wolf Creek - Montana

== Du ==
- Duck Creek - Ohio
- Duck River - Alabama
- Duck River - Tennessee
- Duckabush River - Washington
- Dugdemona River - Louisiana
- Dungeness River - Washington
- DuPage River - Illinois
- Dupuyer Creek - Montana
- Duwamish River - Washington
