= List of rivers of the United States: O =

A - B - C - D - E - F - G - H - I - J - K - L - M - N - O - P - Q - R - S - T - U - V - W - XYZ

This is a list of rivers in the United States that have names starting with the letter O. For the main page, which includes links to listings by state, see List of rivers in the United States.

== Oa - Oc ==
- Oak Grove Fork Clackamas River - Oregon
- Oak Orchard River - New York
- Oatka Creek - New York
- Obed River - Tennessee
- Obey River - Tennessee
- Obion River - Tennessee
- Occoquan River - Virginia
- Ocheyedan River - Iowa, Minnesota
- Ochlockonee River - Georgia, Florida
- Ocklawaha River - Florida
- Ocmulgee River - Georgia
- Ocoee River - Tennessee
- Oconee River - Georgia
- Oconomowoc River - Wisconsin
- Oconto River - Wisconsin
- Octoraro Creek - Pennsylvania, Maryland

== Og - Om ==
- Ogden River - Utah
- Ogeechee River - Georgia
- Ohio Brush Creek - Ohio
- Ohio River - Pennsylvania, Ohio, West Virginia, Kentucky, Indiana, Illinois
- Ohoopee River - Georgia
- Oil Creek - New York, Pennsylvania
- Okanogan River - Washington
- Old River - California
- Old River - Louisiana
- Old River - New Hampshire
- Olentangy River - Ohio
- Oleta River - Florida
- Ompompanoosuc River - Vermont

== On - Os ==
- One Hundred and Two River - Iowa, Missouri
- Oneida River - New York
- Onion River - Wisconsin (tributary of Lake Superior)
- Onion River - Wisconsin (tributary of Sheboygan River)
- Ontonagon River - Michigan
- Oolenoy River - South Carolina
- Oostanaula River - Georgia
- Opequon Creek - Virginia, West Virginia
- Oriskany Creek - New York
- Osage River - Missouri
- Oso Flaco Creek - California
- Ossipee River - New Hampshire, Maine
- Oswegatchie River - New York
- Oswego River - New Jersey
- Oswego River - New York

== Ot - Oy ==
- Otay River - California
- Otselic River - New York
- Ottauquechee River - Vermont
- Ottawa River - Ohio (tributary of Auglaize River)
- Ottawa River - Ohio, Michigan (tributary of Lake Erie)
- Otter Creek - Vermont
- Otter Tail River - Minnesota
- Ouachita River - Arkansas, Louisiana
- Ounce River - Wisconsin
- Owens River - California
- Owyhee River - Nevada, Idaho, Oregon
- Oyster River - Connecticut
- Oyster River - New Hampshire
- Oyster Pond River - Massachusetts
