= South Branch Pawtuxet River =

River in Rhode Island, United States

Coordinates: 41.6877°N 71.5763°W

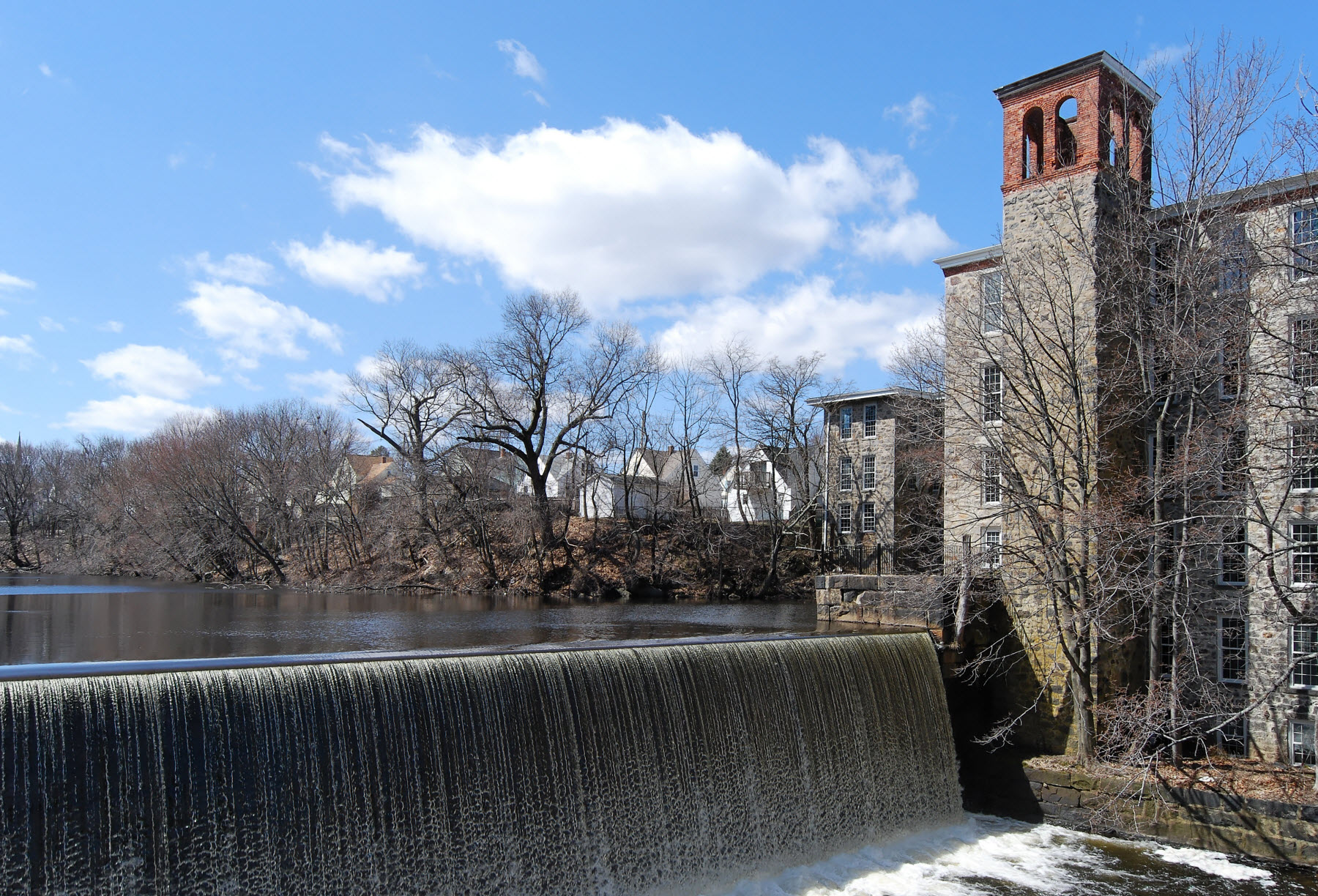
South Branch Pawtuxet River at Royal Mills

The South Branch Pawtuxet River is a river in the U.S. state of Rhode Island. It flows approximately 9.8 miles (15.8 km). There are 11 dams along the river's length.

== Course ==
The river is formed by the confluence of the Big and Flat rivers in the area now flooded by the Flat River Reservoir in Coventry. From there, it flows east and then northeast through Coventry and the historic textile mill villages of Anthony, Quidnick, Crompton, Centreville, Arctic and River Point West Warwick where it converges with the North Branch Pawtuxet River to form the main branch of the Pawtuxet River.

== Crossings ==
Below is a list of all crossings over the South Branch Pawtuxet River. The list starts at the headwaters and goes downstream:

Town	Carrying
Coventry	South Main St.
Coventry	Route 33
Coventry	Laurell Ave.
West Warwick	Pulaski St.
West Warwick	Main St.
West Warwick	Factory St.
West Warwick	Route 115/ Route 33

== Tributaries ==
The Mishnock River and Hawkinson Brook are the South Branch Pawtuxet River's only named tributaries, though it has many unnamed streams that also feed it.

== See also ==
- List of rivers in Rhode Island
- Flat River
- Big River
- Mishnock River
- North Branch Pawtuxet River
- Pawtuxet River
