= List of rivers of the United States: V =

A - B - C - D - E - F - G - H - I - J - K - L - M - N - O - P - Q - R - S - T - U - V - W - XYZ

This is a list of rivers in the United States that have names starting with the letter V. For the main page, which includes links to listings by state, see List of rivers in the United States.

== V ==
- Van Duzen River - California
- Vasquez Creek - California
- Vedder River - Washington
- Ventura River - California
- Verde River - Arizona
- Verdigris River - Kansas, Oklahoma
- Vermilion River (Illinois River tributary) - Illinois
- Vermilion River (Wabash River tributary) - Illinois
- Vermilion River - Louisiana
- Vermilion River - Minnesota
- Vermilion River - Ohio
- Vermillion River - Minnesota
- Vermillion River - South Dakota
- Vermillion River - Wisconsin
- Vince Bayou - Texas
- Virgin River - Utah, Nevada
- Volga River - Iowa
