= Flat River (South Branch Pawtuxet River tributary) =

River in Rhode Island, United States

The Flat River is a river in the U.S. state of Rhode Island. The river is formed in Coventry by the confluence of Sawmill and Pine Swamp brooks. Including tributaries, it flows approximately 3.6 miles (5.8 km) to the Flat River Reservoir, where it converges with the Big River to form the South Branch Pawtuxet River.

== See also ==
- Flat River (Washington County)
