= List of rivers of the United States: P =

A – B – C – D – E – F – G – H – I – J – K – L – M – N – O – P – Q – R – S – T – U – V – W – XYZ

This is a list of rivers in the United States that have names starting with the letter P. For the main page, which includes links to listings by state, see List of rivers in the United States.

== Pa ==
- Pack River – Idaho
- Pacolet River – South Carolina
- Pahsimeroi River – Idaho
- Paint Creek, Scioto tributary – Ohio
- Paint Creek stream – Ohio
- Paint Rock River – Alabama
- Pajaro River – California
- Palmer River – Massachusetts, Rhode Island
- Palouse River – Idaho, Washington
- Paluxy River – Texas
- Pamet River – Massachusetts
- Pamlico River – North Carolina
- Pamunkey River – Virginia
- Panther Creek – Illinois
- Paria River – Utah, Arizona
- Park River – Connecticut
- Partridge River – Minnesota
- Pasayten River – Washington
- Pascagoula River – Mississippi
- Pascoag River – Rhode Island
- Paskamanset River – Massachusetts
- Pasquotank River – North Carolina
- Passagassawakeag River – Maine
- Passaic River – New Jersey
- Passumpsic River – Vermont
- Patapsco River – Maryland
- Patoka River – Indiana
- Patterson Creek – West Virginia
- Patuxent River – Maryland
- Paulins Kill – New Jersey
- Paw Paw River – Michigan
- Pawcatuck River – Rhode Island, Connecticut
- Pawtuckaway River – New Hampshire
- Pawtuxet River – Rhode Island
- Payette River – Idaho

== Pe – Ph ==
- Pea River – Alabama
- Peabody River – New Hampshire
- Peace River – Florida
- Pearl River – Mississippi, Louisiana
- Pecatonica River – Wisconsin, Illinois
- Peckman River – New Jersey
- Peconic River – New York
- Pecos River – New Mexico, Texas
- Pedernales River – Texas
- Pedlar River – Virginia
- Pee Dee River – North Carolina, South Carolina
- Pembina River – North Dakota
- Pemebonwon River – Wisconsin
- Pemigewasset River – New Hampshire
- Pend Oreille River – Idaho, Washington
- Penns Creek – Pennsylvania
- Penobscot River – Maine
- Pensaukee River – Wisconsin
- Pepper Creek – Delaware
- Pequannock River – New Jersey
- Pequea Creek – Pennsylvania
- Pequest River – New Jersey
- Pequonnock River – Connecticut
- Perdido River – Alabama, Florida
- Pere Marquette River – Michigan
- Perkiomen Creek – Pennsylvania
- Perquimans River – North Carolina
- Perry Stream – New Hampshire
- Peshtigo River – Wisconsin
- Petaluma River – California
- Peters Creek – Pennsylvania
- Peters River – Massachusetts, Rhode Island
- Pettaquamscutt River – Rhode Island
- Phillips Brook – New Hampshire
- Phoenix Creek - California

== Pi – Pl ==
- Pigeon Creek – Indiana
- Pigeon River – Michigan
- Pigeon River – Minnesota
- Pigeon River – North Carolina, Tennessee
- Pigeon River – Wisconsin
- Pigg River – Virginia
- Pike River – Wisconsin (tributary of Lake Michigan)
- Pike River – Wisconsin (tributary of Menominee River)
- Pilchuck River – Washington
- Pinconning River – Michigan
- Pine Creek – Pennsylvania
- Pine River – Michigan
- Pine River – Minnesota
- Pine River – New Hampshire
- Pine River – Rhode Island
- Pine River – Wisconsin (tributary of Wisconsin River)
- Pine River – Wisconsin (tributary of Wolf River)
- Piney River – eastern Tennessee
- Piney River – central Tennessee
- Pinnacle Creek – West Virginia
- Pinnebog River – Michigan
- Pipers Creek – Washington
- Pipestem River – North Dakota
- Piru Creek – California
- Piscassic River – New Hampshire
- Piscataqua River – New Hampshire, Maine
- Piscataquis River – Maine
- Piscataquog River – New Hampshire
- Pismo Creek - California
- Pit River – California
- Pithlachascotee River – Florida
- Pitmegea River – Alaska
- Plateau Creek – Colorado
- Platte River – Michigan
- Platte River – Minnesota
- Platte River – Iowa, Missouri
- Platte River – Nebraska
- Platte River – Wisconsin
- Pleasant River – Maine
- Plover River – Wisconsin
- Plum River – Illinois

== Po ==
- Po River – Virginia
- Pocasset River – Massachusetts
- Pocasset River – Rhode Island
- Pocatalico River – West Virginia
- Pocomoke River – Delaware, Maryland
- Pohatcong Creek – New Jersey
- Pohopoco Creek – Pennsylvania
- Point Pleasant Creek – West Virginia
- Pokegama River – Wisconsin
- Pomme de Terre River – Minnesota
- Pomme de Terre River – Missouri
- Pompton River – New Jersey
- Ponaganset River – Rhode Island
- Pond Creek – West Virginia
- Pond River – Kentucky
- Poni River – Virginia
- Poplar River – Montana
- Poplar River – Wisconsin
- Popple River – Wisconsin
- Porcupine River – Alaska
- Port Tobacco River – Maryland
- Portage River – Michigan
- Portage River – Ohio
- Portneuf River – Idaho
- Potato River – Wisconsin
- Poteau River – Arkansas, Oklahoma
- Potomac River – District of Columbia, Maryland, West Virginia, Virginia
- Potowomut River – Rhode Island
- Powder River – Montana, Wyoming
- Powder River – Oregon
- Powell River – Virginia, Tennessee
- Powwow River – New Hampshire, Massachusetts

== Pr – Pu ==
- Prairie River – Wisconsin
- Prairie Dog Town Fork Red River – Texas, Oklahoma
- Presque Isle River – Michigan
- Presumpscot River – Maine
- Price River – Utah
- Priest River – Idaho
- Providence River – Rhode Island
- Provo River – Utah
- Pudding River – Oregon
- Pungo River – North Carolina
- Purgatoire River – Colorado
- Putah Creek – California
- Puyallup River – Washington
