= List of rivers of the United States: A =

A - B - C - D - E - F - G - H - I - J - K - L - M - N - O - P - Q - R - S - T - U - V - W - XYZ

This is a list of rivers in the United States that have names starting with the letter A. For the main page, which includes links to listings by state, see List of rivers in the United States.

== Ab - Al ==
- Aberjona River - Massachusetts
- Abiqua Creek - Oregon
- Abita River - Louisiana
- Acushnet River - Massachusetts
- Agawam River - Massachusetts
- Agua Fria River - Arizona
- Ahnapee River - Wisconsin
- Alabama River - Alabama
- Alafia River - Florida
- Alagnak River - Alaska
- Alameda Creek - California
- Alamo River - California
- Alamosa River - Colorado
- Alapaha River - Georgia, Florida
- Alatna River - Alaska
- Albion River - California
- Alcovy River - Georgia
- Alexander Creek - Alaska
- Aliso Creek (Los Angeles County) - California
- Aliso Creek (Orange County) - California
- Allagash River - Maine
- Allegheny River - Pennsylvania, New York
- Alligator River - North Carolina
- Alsea River - Oregon
- Alsek River - Alaska
- Altamaha River - Georgia
- Alum Creek - Ohio

== Am - An ==
- Amargosa River - California, Nevada
- American Fork - Utah
- American River - California
- American River - Washington
- Americano Creek - California
- Amite River - Mississippi, Louisiana
- Ammonoosuc River - New Hampshire
- Amnicon River - Wisconsin
- Anacostia River - Maryland, District of Columbia
- Anahulu River - Hawaii
- Anaktuvuk River - Alaska
- Anclote River - Florida
- Anderson River - Indiana
- Andreafsky River - Alaska
- Androscoggin River - New Hampshire, Maine
- Angelina River - Texas
- Aniak River - Alaska
- Aniakchak River - Alaska
- Animas River - Colorado, New Mexico
- Anna River - Michigan
- Annaquatucket River - Rhode Island
- Annisquam River - Massachusetts
- Antietam Creek - Pennsylvania, Maryland
- Antoine Creek - Louisiana
- Antoine River - Arkansas
- Anvik River - Alaska

== Ap - Ar ==
- Apalachicola River - Florida
- Apple River - Wisconsin, Illinois
- Apple River - Wisconsin
- Applegate River - Oregon
- Appomattox River - Virginia
- Appoquinimink River - Delaware
- Aransas River - Texas
- Ararat River - Virginia, North Carolina
- Arikaree River - Colorado, Kansas, Nebraska
- Arkansas River - Colorado, Kansas, Oklahoma, Arkansas
- Armstrong Creek - Pennsylvania
- Armstrong Creek - West Virginia
- Arnold Creek - West Virginia
- Aroostook River - Maine
- Arrow Creek - Montana
- Arroyo de en Medio - California
- Arroyo Grande Creek - California
- Arroyo Seco - California
- Arroyo Trabuco - California
- Artichoke River - Minnesota

== As - Aw ==
- Ashaway River - Rhode Island
- Ashepoo River - South Carolina
- Ashippun River - Wisconsin
- Ashley River - South Carolina
- Ashtabula River - Ohio
- Ashuelot River - New Hampshire
- Assabet River - Massachusetts
- Assonet River - Massachusetts
- Atchafalaya River - Louisiana
- Au Sable River - Michigan
- Aucilla River - Florida
- Auglaize River - Ohio
- Ausable River - New York
- Awuna River - Alaska
