= List of rivers of the United States: G =

A - B - C - D - E - F - G - H - I - J - K - L - M - N - O - P - Q - R - S - T - U - V - W - XYZ

This is a list of rivers in the United States that have names starting with the letter G. For the main page, which includes links to listings by state, see List of rivers in the United States.

== Ga ==
- Gakona River - Alaska
- Gale River - New Hampshire
- Galena River - Wisconsin, Illinois
- Galien River - Michigan
- Gallatin River - Wyoming, Montana
- Garcia River - California
- Gasconade River - Missouri
- Gasper River - Kentucky
- Gauley River - West Virginia

== Ge - Go ==
- Genesee River - Pennsylvania, New York
- Gibbon River - Wyoming
- Gila River - New Mexico, Arizona
- Glady Fork of the Cheat River - West Virginia
- Glover River - Oklahoma
- Goodhope River - Alaska
- Goose Creek - Virginia

== Gr ==
- Grand River - Michigan
- Grand River - Missouri, Iowa
- Grand River - Ohio
- Grand River - Oklahoma
- Grand River - North and South Dakota
- Grand River - Wisconsin
- Grand Calumet River - Indiana
- Grande Ronde River - Oregon, Washington
- Grant River - Wisconsin
- Grass River - Michigan
- Grasse River - New York
- Gray Wolf River - Washington
- Grays River - Washington
- Great Brook - New Hampshire
- Great Brook - New Jersey
- Great Chazy River - New York
- Great Egg Harbor River - New Jersey
- Great Miami River - Ohio
- Great Trough Creek - Pennsylvania
- Great Works River - Maine
- Green River - Illinois
- Green River - Kentucky
- Green River, a tributary of the Housatonic River in Massachusetts and New York
- Green River, a tributary of the Hoosic River in Massachusetts
- Green River, a tributary of the Deerfield River in Massachusetts and Vermont
- Green River - North Carolina
- Green River - North Dakota
- Green River - Tennessee
- Green River - Utah, Colorado, Wyoming
- Green River, a tributary of the Duwamish River in Washington
- Green River, a tributary of North Fork Toutle River in Washington
- Green Fall River - Connecticut, Rhode Island
- Greenbrier River - West Virginia
- Greenwater River - Washington
- Greys River - Wyoming
- Gridley River - New Hampshire
- Gros Ventre River - Wyoming

== Gu ==
- Guadalupe River - California
- Guadalupe River - Texas
- Gualala River - California
- Guest River - Virginia
- Gulkana River - Alaska
- Gunnison River - Colorado
- Gunpowder River - Pennsylvania, Maryland
- Gunstock River - New Hampshire
- Guyandotte River - West Virginia
