= List of rivers of the United States: U =

A - B - C - D - E - F - G - H - I - J - K - L - M - N - O - P - Q - R - S - T - U - V - W - XYZ

This is a list of rivers in the United States that have names starting with the letter U. For the main page, which includes links to listings by state, see List of rivers in the United States.

== U ==
- Ugashik River - Alaska
- Umatilla River - Oregon
- Umpachene River - Massachusetts
- Umpqua River - Oregon
- Unadilla River - New York
- Unalakleet River - Alaska
- Uncompahgre River - Colorado
- Union River - Maine
- Unuk River - Alaska
- Upper Ammonoosuc River - New Hampshire
- Upper Iowa River - Minnesota, Iowa
- Upper Tamarack River - Wisconsin, Minnesota
- Us-kab-wan-ka River - Minnesota
- Usquepaug River - Rhode Island
- Utukok River - Alaska
- Uwharrie River - North Carolina
