= List of rivers of the United States: Q =

A - B - C - D - E - F - G - H - I - J - K - L - M - N - O - P - Q - R - S - T - U - V - W - XYZ

This is a list of rivers in the United States that have names starting with the letter Q. For the main page, which includes links to listings by state, see List of rivers in the United States.

== Q ==
- Quaboag River - Massachusetts
- Quaket River - Rhode Island
- Quantico Creek - Virginia
- Quashnet River - Massachusetts
- Queen River - Rhode Island
- Queets River - Washington
- Quequechan River - Massachusetts
- Quillayute River - Washington
- Quinapoxet River - Massachusetts
- Quinault River - Washington
- Quinebaug River - Connecticut
- Quinn River - Nevada
- Quinnipiac River - Connecticut
- Quinsigamond River - Massachusetts
- Quittapahilla Creek - Pennsylvania
