= List of rivers of the United States: XYZ =

A – B – C – D – E – F – G – H – I – J – K – L – M – N – O – P – Q – R – S – T – U – V – W – XYZ

This is a list of rivers in the United States that have names starting with the letters X, Y and Z. For the main page, which includes links to listings by state, see List of rivers in the United States.

== Y ==
- Yaak River – Montana, British Columbia
- Yachats River – Oregon
- Yadkin River – North Carolina
- Yahara River – Wisconsin
- Yakima River – Washington
- Yalobusha River – Mississippi
- Yamhill River – Oregon
- Yampa River – Colorado
- Yantic River – Connecticut
- Yaquina River – Oregon
- Yazoo River – Mississippi
- Yellow Creek – Illinois
- Yellow River – Alabama, Florida
- Yellow River – Indiana
- Yellow River – Iowa
- Yellow River – Wisconsin (Chippewa River tributary)
- Yellow River – Wisconsin (Red Cedar River tributary)
- Yellow River – Wisconsin (St. Croix River tributary)
- Yellow River – Wisconsin (Wisconsin River tributary)
- Yellow Bank River – South Dakota, Minnesota
- Yellow Dog River – Michigan
- Yellow Medicine River – Minnesota
- Yellowstone River – Wyoming, Montana, North Dakota
- Yentna River – Alaska
- Yeocomico River – Virginia
- Yockanookany River – Mississippi
- Yocona River – Mississippi
- York River – Maine
- York River – Virginia
- Youghiogheny River – West Virginia, Maryland, Pennsylvania
- Youngs River – Oregon
- Yuba River – California
- Yukon River – Alaska

== Z ==
- Zealand River – New Hampshire
- Zigzag River – Oregon
- Zumbro River – Minnesota
- Zuni River – New Mexico, Arizona,
