= List of rivers of the United States: J =

A - B - C - D - E - F - G - H - I - J - K - L - M - N - O - P - Q - R - S - T - U - V - W - XYZ

This is a list of rivers in the United States that have names starting with the letter J. For the main page, which includes links to listings by state, see List of rivers in the United States.

== J ==
- Jacks River - Georgia
- Jacks Fork - Missouri
- Jackson River - Virginia
- Jail Branch River - Vermont
- James Fork - Arkansas, Oklahoma
- James River - Missouri
- James River - North Dakota, South Dakota
- James River - Virginia
- Jarbidge River - Nevada, Idaho
- Jefferson River - Montana
- Jemez River - New Mexico
- Jeremy River - Connecticut
- John River - Alaska
- John Day River - northeastern Oregon
- John Day River - northwestern Oregon
- Johns River - New Hampshire
- Johnson Creek - Oregon
- Jones River - Massachusetts
- Jordan River - Michigan
- Jordan River - Utah
- Jordan River - Virginia
- Jorgenson River - South Dakota
- Jourdan River - Mississippi
- Judith River - Montana
- Jump River - Wisconsin
- Juniata River - Pennsylvania
