= List of rivers of the United States: E =

A - B - C - D - E - F - G - H - I - J - K - L - M - N - O - P - Q - R - S - T - U - V - W - XYZ

This is a list of rivers in the United States that have names starting with the letter E. For the main page, which includes links to listings by state, see List of rivers in the United States.

== Ea ==
- Eagle Creek - Arizona
- Eagle River - Alaska
- Eagle River - Colorado
- Eagle River - Michigan
- Eagle River - Wisconsin
- Eagle Hill River - Massachusetts
- East River - Florida
- East River - New York
- East River - Tidewater Virginia
- East River - Virginia, West Virginia (tributary of New River)
- East River - Wisconsin
- East Bay River - Florida
- East Branch Dead Diamond River - New Hampshire
- East Branch Delaware River - New York
- East Branch Pecatonica River - Wisconsin
- East Branch Pemigewasset River - New Hampshire
- East Branch Saco River - New Hampshire
- East Brookfield River - Massachusetts
- East Canada Creek - New York
- East Fork River - Alabama
- East Gallatin River - Montana
- East Nishnabotna River - Iowa
- East Twin River - Wisconsin
- East Verde River - Arizona
- East Walker River - Nevada, California
- Eau Claire River - Wisconsin (tributary of Chippewa River)
- Eau Claire River - Wisconsin (tributary of St. Croix River)
- Eau Claire River - Wisconsin (tributary of Wisconsin River)
- Eau Galle River - Wisconsin
- Eau Gallie River - Florida
- Eau Pleine River, see Big Eau Pleine River and Little Eau Pleine River - Wisconsin

== Ec - Ek ==
- Econfina River - Florida
- Econlockhatchee River - Florida
- Ecorse River - Michigan
- Edisto River - South Carolina
- Edwards River - Illinois
- Eek River - Alaska
- Eel River - California
- Eel River (Wabash River) - Indiana
- Eel River (White River) - Indiana
- Eel River - Massachusetts
- Egegik River - Alaska
- Egypt River - Massachusetts
- Eightmile River - Connecticut
- Eklutna River - Alaska

== El ==
- Ela River - New Hampshire
- Eleven Point River - Missouri, Arkansas
- Elizabeth River - New Jersey
- Elizabeth River - Virginia
- Elk Creek - Pennsylvania
- Elk Creek - West Virginia
- Elk Fork - West Virginia
- Elk River - Kansas
- Elk River - Maryland
- Elk River - Michigan
- Elk River - Minnesota
- Elk River - Missouri, Oklahoma
- Elk River - North Carolina, Tennessee
- Elk River - Oregon
- Elk River - Tennessee, Alabama
- Elk River - West Virginia
- Elk River - Wisconsin
- Elkhart River - Indiana
- Elkhorn River - Nebraska
- Ellicott Creek - New York
- Ellis River - Maine
- Ellis River - New Hampshire
- Elm River - Illinois
- Elm Fork Red River - Oklahoma
- Elwha River - Washington

== Em - Ex ==
- Embarras River - Illinois
- Embarrass River - Wisconsin
- Emory River - Tennessee
- Encampment River - Wyoming
- Endicott River - Alaska
- English River - Iowa
- Eno River - North Carolina
- Enoree River - South Carolina
- Entiat River - Washington
- Escalante River - Utah
- Escambia River - Florida
- Escanaba River - Michigan
- Escatawpa River - Alabama, Mississippi
- Esopus Creek - New York
- Espenberg River - Alaska
- Estero River - Florida
- Estrella River - California
- Etivluk River - Alaska
- Etowah River - Georgia
- Evitts Creek - Pennsylvania, Maryland
- Exeter River - New Hampshire
