= List of rivers of the United States =

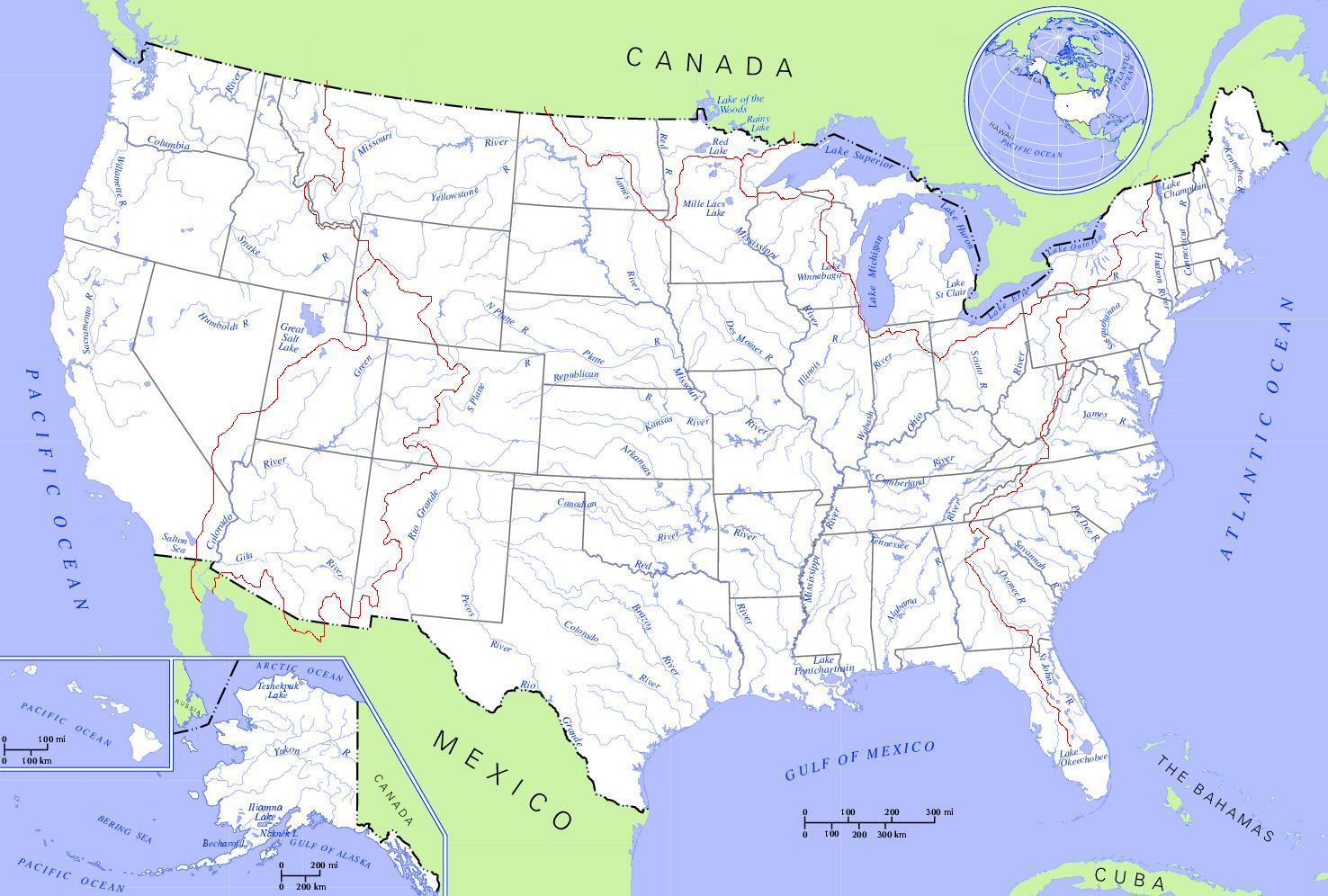
A map of the major rivers of the United States.

The following list is a list of rivers of the United States.

== Alphabetical listing ==
Listings of the rivers in the United States by letter of the alphabet:

A - B - C - D - E - F - G - H - I - J - K - L - M - N - O - P - Q - R - S - T - U - V - W - XYZ

== By state and territory ==
- Alabama
- Alaska
- Arizona
- Arkansas
- California
- Colorado
- Connecticut
- Delaware
- Florida
- Georgia
- Hawaii
- Idaho
- Illinois
- Indiana
- Iowa
- Kansas
- Kentucky
- Louisiana
- Maine
- Maryland
- Massachusetts
- Michigan
- Minnesota
- Mississippi
- Missouri
- Montana
- Nebraska
- Nevada
- New Hampshire
- New Jersey
- New Mexico
- New York
- North Carolina
- North Dakota
- Ohio
- Oklahoma
- Oregon
- Pennsylvania
- Rhode Island
- South Carolina
- South Dakota
- Tennessee
- Texas
- Utah
- Vermont
- Virginia
- Washington
- Washington, D.C.
- West Virginia
- Wisconsin
- Wyoming

- American Samoa
- Guam
- Northern Mariana Islands
- Puerto Rico
- US Virgin Islands

== See also ==
- List of longest rivers of the United States (by main stem)
- List of longest rivers of the United States by state
- List of rivers of the United States by discharge
- List of National Wild and Scenic Rivers
- List of river borders of U.S. states
- List of rivers of U.S. insular areas
- List of rivers of the Americas by coastline
