= List of rivers of the United States: B =

A - B - C - D - E - F - G - H - I - J - K - L - M - N - O - P - Q - R - S - T - U - V - W - XYZ

This is a list of rivers in the United States that have names starting with the letter B. For the main page, which includes links to listings by state, see List of rivers in the United States.

== Ba ==
- Back Creek - Virginia, West Virginia
- Back River - New Hampshire, Massachusetts
- Bad River - South Dakota
- Bad River - Wisconsin
- Bad Axe River - Wisconsin
- Baker River - New Hampshire
- Baker River - Washington
- Baker Brook River - Vermont
- Bald River - Tennessee
- Bald Eagle Creek - Pennsylvania
- Ballona Creek - California
- Ballston Creek - New York
- Banister River - Virginia
- Baraboo River - Wisconsin
- Baranof River - Alaska
- Bark River - Michigan
- Bark River - Wisconsin (tributary of Lake Superior)
- Bark River - Wisconsin (tributary of Rock River)
- Barkers Creek - West Virginia
- Barnes Creek - Washington
- Barnes Creek - Wisconsin
- Barren Fork - Tennessee
- Barren River - Kentucky
- Barrington River - Rhode Island
- Barton Creek - Texas
- Barton River - Vermont
- Bass River - Massachusetts
- Bass River - New Jersey
- Bates Old River -South Carolina
- Batsto River - New Jersey
- Batten Kill - Vermont, New York
- Battle Creek River - Michigan
- Baudette River - Minnesota
- Baugh Creek - Idaho
- Bayou des Arc - Arkansas
- Bayou des Cannes - Louisiana
- Bayou Macon - Arkansas, Louisiana
- Bayou Manchac - Louisiana
- Bayou Nezpique - Louisiana
- Bayou Plaquemine Brule - Louisiana
- Bayou Queue de Tortue - Louisiana
- Bayou Teche - Louisiana
- Bayou Wikoff - Louisiana

== Be ==
- Bean River - New Hampshire
- Bear Creek - Alabama
- Bear Creek - Oregon
- Bear River (Feather River tributary) - California
- Bear River (Mokelumne River tributary) - California
- Bear River - Michigan
- Bear River - Utah, Idaho, Wyoming
- Bear River - Wisconsin
- Bearcamp River - New Hampshire
- Beaucoup Creek - Illinois
- Beaver Brook - New Hampshire, Massachusetts
- Beaver Creek - Alaska
- Beaver Creek - Iowa
- Beaver Kill River - New York
- Beaver River - New York
- Beaver River - Oklahoma
- Beaver River - Pennsylvania
- Beaver River - Rhode Island
- Beaver Dam River - Wisconsin
- Beaverhead River - Montana
- Beebe River - New Hampshire
- Beech Creek - Pennsylvania
- Beech Fork - Kentucky (Beech Fork of the Salt River)
- Beech River - New Hampshire
- Beech River - Tennessee
- Bellamy River - New Hampshire
- Belle River - Michigan
- Belle Fourche River - Wyoming, South Dakota
- Belt Creek - Montana
- Berrys River - New Hampshire
- Betsie River - Michigan

== Bi ==
- Big River - California
- Big River - Missouri
- Big River - New Hampshire
- Big River - Oregon
- Big River - Rhode Island
- Big River - Wisconsin
- Big Black River - Mississippi
- Big Blue River - Indiana
- Big Blue River - Nebraska, Kansas
- Big Chico Creek - California
- Big Coal River - West Virginia
- Big Darby Creek - Ohio
- Big Green River - Wisconsin
- Big Hole River - Montana
- Big Lost River - Idaho
- Big Muddy Creek - Montana
- Big Muddy River - Illinois
- Big Pine Creek - Indiana
- Big Rib River - Wisconsin
- Big Quilcene River - Washington
- Big Sandy Creek - Montana
- Big Sandy Creek - West Virginia
- Big Sandy River - Arizona
- Big Sandy River - Kentucky, West Virginia
- Big Sandy River - Tennessee
- Big Sandy River - Wyoming
- Big Sioux River - South Dakota, Iowa
- Big South Fork of the Cumberland River - Tennessee, Kentucky
- Big Sugar Creek - Missouri
- Big Sur River - California
- Big Thompson River - Colorado
- Big Wood River - Idaho
- Bighorn River - Wyoming, Montana
- Bill Williams River - Arizona
- Birch Creek - Alaska
- Birch Creek - Montana
- Birch River - West Virginia
- Bitter Creek - Wyoming
- Bitterroot River - Montana

== Bl ==
- Black River - Arizona
- Black River - Arkansas, Missouri
- List of Michigan rivers named Black River
- Black River - New Jersey
- Black River - New York
- Black River - North Carolina
- Black River - Ohio
- Black River - South Carolina
- Black River - northern Vermont
- Black River - southern Vermont
- Black River - Washington (Chehalis River tributary)
- Black River - Washington (Duwamish River tributary)
- Black River - Wisconsin (tributary of Lake Michigan)
- Black River - Wisconsin (tributary of Mississippi River)
- Black River - Wisconsin (tributary of Nemadji River)
- Black River - Wisconsin, Michigan
- Black Butte River - California
- Black Fork of the Cheat River - West Virginia
- Black Fork Mohican River - Ohio
- Black Lake Bayou - Louisiana
- Black Mallard River - Michigan
- Black Warrior River - Alabama
- Blackbird Creek - Delaware
- Blackfoot River - Idaho
- Blackfoot River - Montana
- Blacklick Creek - Ohio
- Blacklick Creek - Pennsylvania
- Blacks Fork of the Green River - Wyoming, Utah
- Blackstone River - Massachusetts, Rhode Island
- Blackwater River - Alabama
- Blackwater River - Alabama, Florida
- Blackwater River - Maryland
- Blackwater River - Massachusetts, New Hampshire
- Blackwater River - Missouri
- Blackwater River - New Hampshire
- Blackwater River - Virginia
- Blackwater River - West Virginia
- Blanchard River - Ohio
- Blanco River - Texas
- Blood River - Tennessee, Kentucky
- Blue River - Arizona
- Blue River - Colorado
- Blue River - Kansas, Missouri
- Blue River - Oklahoma
- Blue River - Oregon
- Blue River - Wisconsin
- Blue Earth River - Minnesota
- Blueberry River - Minnesota
- Bluestone River - Virginia, West Virginia

== Bo ==
- Boardman River - Michigan
- Boeuf River - Arkansas, Louisiana
- Bog River - New York
- Bogachiel River - Washington
- Bogue Falaya River - Louisiana
- Bohemia River - Delaware, Maryland
- Bois Brule River - Wisconsin
- Bois de Sioux River - Minnesota, South Dakota, North Dakota
- Boise River - Idaho
- Bonpas Creek - Illinois
- Boone River - Iowa
- Bosque River - Texas
- Bouie River - Mississippi
- Boulder River - Montana (tributary of the Yellowstone River)
- Boulder River - Montana (tributary of the Jefferson River)
- Boulder River - Washington
- Bouquet River - New York
- Bourbeuse River - Missouri
- Boyer River - Iowa

== Br ==
- Braden River - Florida
- Branch River - New Hampshire
- Branch River - Rhode Island
- Branch River - Wisconsin
- Brandywine Creek (Broken Sword Creek) - Crawford County, Ohio
- Brandywine Creek (Christina River) - Delaware, Pennsylvania
- Brandywine Creek (Cuyahoga River) - Summit County, Ohio
- Brays Bayou - Texas
- Brazos River - Texas
- Breitenbush River - Oregon
- Bremner River - Alaska
- Bridge Creek - Oregon
- Brill River - Wisconsin
- Broad River - Georgia
- Broad River - North Carolina, northern South Carolina
- Broad River - coastal South Carolina
- Broadkill River - Delaware
- Broglen River - Alabama
- Brokenstraw Creek - New York, Pennsylvania
- Bronx River - New York
- Browns River - New Hampshire
- Browns River - Vermont
- Brule River - Michigan, Wisconsin
- Bruneau River - Idaho
- Brunet River - Wisconsin

== Bu - By ==
- Buck Creek - Alabama
- Buck Creek (Mississippi River) - Iowa
- Buckeye Creek - West Virginia
- Buckhannon River - West Virginia
- Buckland River - Alaska
- Buffalo Bayou - Texas
- Buffalo Creek - Illinois
- Buffalo Creek (Allegheny River) - Pennsylvania
- Buffalo Creek (Juniata River) - Pennsylvania
- Buffalo Creek (West Branch Susquehanna River) - Pennsylvania
- Buffalo Creek (Guyandotte River) - West Virginia
- Buffalo Creek (Monongahela River) - West Virginia
- Buffalo Creek (South Branch Potomac River) - West Virginia
- Buffalo River - Arkansas
- Buffalo River - Minnesota
- Buffalo River - New York
- Buffalo River - Tennessee
- Buffalo River - Wisconsin
- Bull River - West Virginia
- Bull Run River - Virginia
- Bull Run River - Oregon
- Bullpasture River - Virginia
- Bully Creek - Oregon
- Bumping River - Washington
- Bumps River - Massachusetts
- Bungay River - Massachusetts
- Burnshirt River - Massachusetts
- Burnt River - Oregon
- Bush River - South Carolina
- Buttahatchee River - Alabama, Mississippi
- Butte Creek - California
- Butte Creek - Oregon
- Byram River - Connecticut, New York
