= Kakhonak River =

River in Alaska

Coordinates: 59°26′53″N 154°28′45″W

The Kakhonak River is a river in Alaska that flows from Kakhonak Lake into Iliamna Lake via Kakhonak Bay. It is fast moving river with white water and four waterfalls. It has a large fish population including trout, grayling and salmon.

Bud Branham built a cabin at Kakhonak Falls in 1949, which eventually grew into Kakhonak Falls Lodge, the first sportsmen's lodge in the Bristol Bay watershed.

== See also ==
- List of Alaska rivers
