= New River (New Hampshire) =

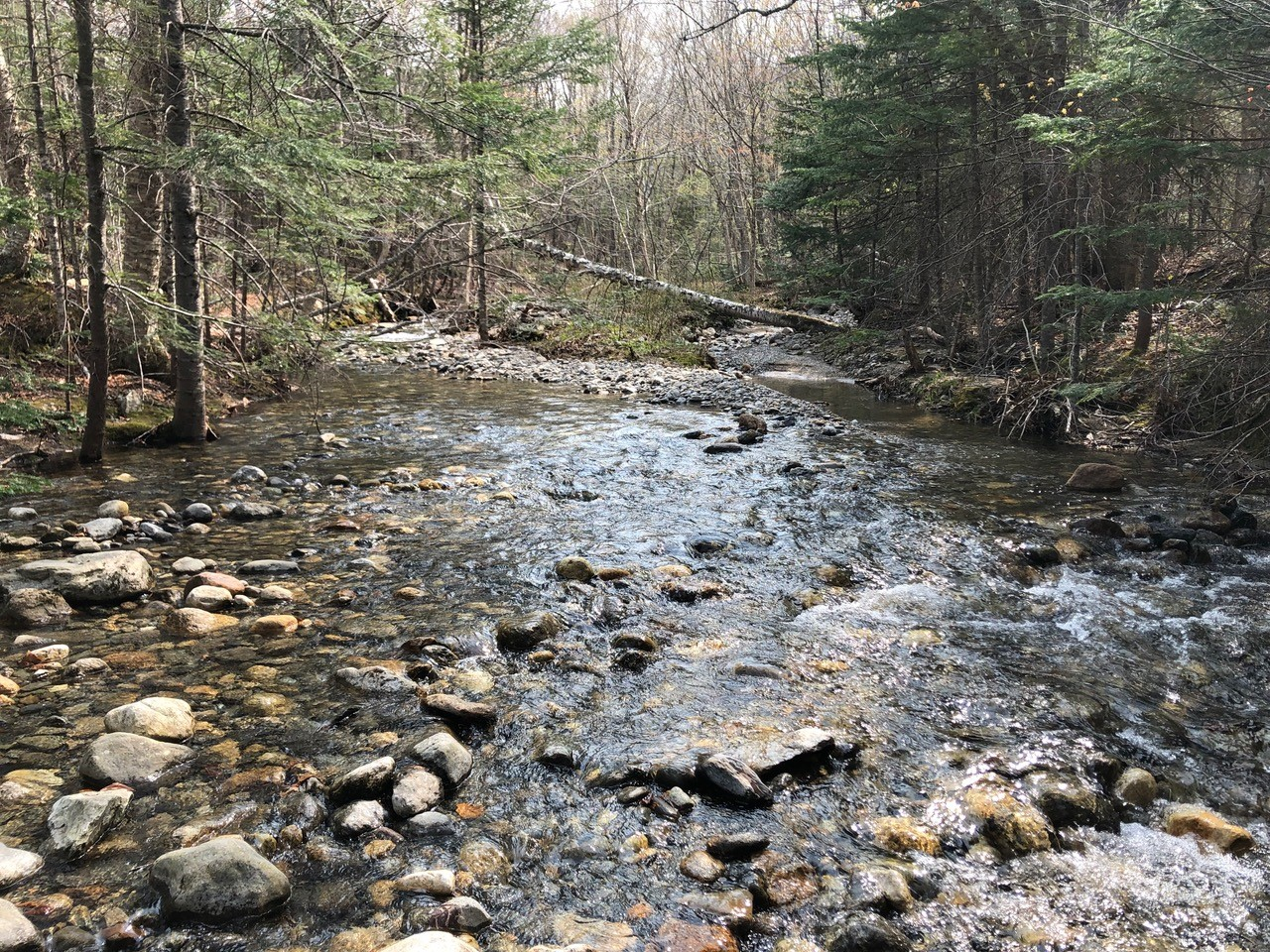
- The New River near its mouth in Pinkham Notch

- Location within New Hampshire Location within the United States

Location
- Country: United States
- State: New Hampshire
- County: Coos
- Townships: Sargents Purchase, Pinkhams Grant

Physical characteristics
- Source: Gulf of Slides
  - location: Mount Washington
  - coordinates: 44°14′37″N 71°17′26″W
  - elevation: 4,380 ft (1,340 m)
- Mouth: Cutler River
  - location: Pinkham Notch
  - coordinates: 44°15′18″N 71°15′11″W
  - elevation: 2,008 ft (612 m)
- Length: 2.2 mi (3.5 km)

The New River is a 2.2-mile-long (3.5 km) stream in the White Mountains of New Hampshire in the United States. It is a tributary of the Cutler River, part of the Saco River watershed flowing to the Atlantic Ocean in Maine. The river is within the townships of Sargent's Purchase and Pinkham's Grant in Coos County.

The New River rises in the Gulf of Slides, a small glacial cirque at the foot of Boott Spur, a southern extension of Mount Washington. Flowing northeast, the stream drops rapidly down the western slopes of Pinkham Notch, joining the Cutler River in the floor of the notch at the Route 16 crossing, just south of the notch's height of land, and just upstream from the Cutler River's merging with the Ellis River.

== See also ==
- List of rivers of New Hampshire
