= Ninglikfak River =

Coordinates: 61°28′52″N 165°45′04″W

The Ninglikfak River flows into Hooper Bay in the Yukon-Kuskokwim River Delta. The city of Chevak, Alaska is located on this river.

== See also ==
- List of Alaska rivers
