= Nipmuc River =

River in Rhode Island, United States

Coordinates: 41.973580°N 71.683891°W

The Nipmuc River is a river in the U.S. state of Rhode Island. It flows 2.7 miles (4.3 km). There are no dams along the river's length. The river is named for the indigenous Nipmuc peoples.

== Course ==
The river is formed in Burrillville by the confluence of Round Top Brook and the Chockalog River. It flows south to the village of Pascoag where it flows into the Clear River. A USGS stream gauge number 01111300 is located on the river.

== Crossings ==
There are no crossings over the Nipmuc River due to its short length.

== Tributaries ==
The Nipmuc River has no named tributaries, though it has many unnamed streams that also feed it.

== See also ==
- List of rivers in Rhode Island
