= Mishnock River =

River in Rhode Island, United States

Coordinates: 41.670649°N 71.582762°W

Physical characteristics
- Source
  - location: Mishnock Lake
- Mouth
  - location: Washington
- Length: 3.1 m (10 ft)

The Mishnock River is a river in the U.S. state of Rhode Island. It flows 3.1 miles (5.0 km). There are two dams along the river's length.

== Course ==
The river rises at what is now Mishnock Lake in West Greenwich. From there, it flows roughly due north into Coventry where it flows through Mishnock Swamp to the South Branch Pawtuxet River at the village of Washington.

== Crossings ==
Below is a list all crossings over the Mishnock River. The list starts at the headwaters and goes downstream.

- West Greenwich
  - Mishnock Road
- Coventry
  - Tiogue Avenue (RI 3)

== Tributaries ==
Old Hickory Brook is the Mishnock River's only named tributary, though it has many unnamed streams that also feed it.

== See also ==
- List of rivers in Rhode Island
