= Rocky River (Alaska) =

Location
- Country: United States
- State: Alaska
- Borough: Kenai Peninsula

Physical characteristics
- Source
  - location: Kenai Mountains
  - coordinates: 59°21′9″N 151°18′34″W
- Mouth
  - location: Rocky Bay
  - coordinates: 59°16′48″N 151°24′22″W
  - elevation: 0 ft (0 m)
- Length: 12 mi (19 km)

The Rocky River is a stream in Alaska that flows into the Rocky Bay on the Kenai Peninsula at 59°16′48″N 151°24′22″W, just west of Kachemak Bay State Wilderness Park. It rises from the western slopes of the Kenai Mountains at 59°21′09″N 151°18′34″W.
