= Nigu River =

River in Alaska, United States

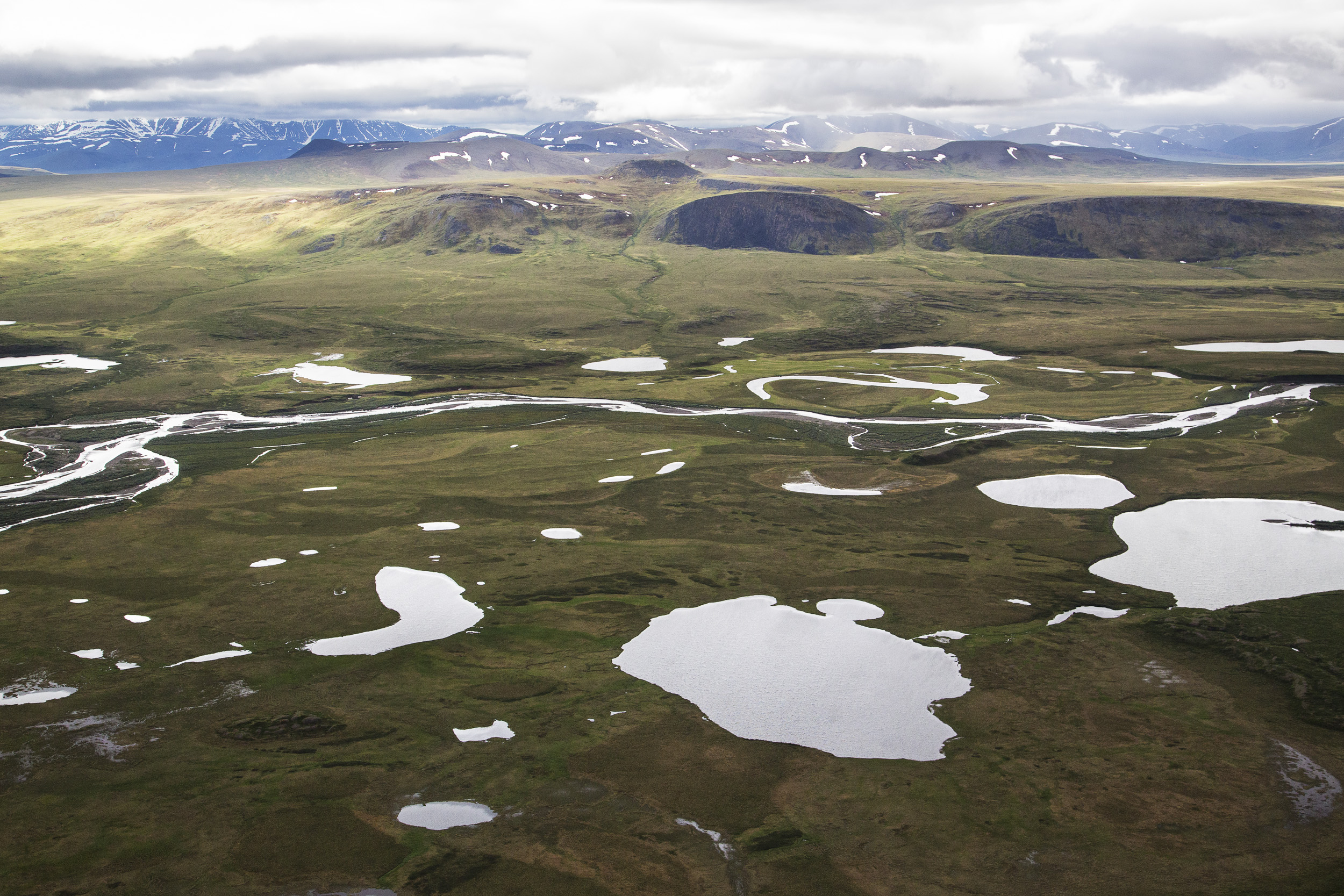

- Location of the mouth of the Nigu River in Alaska

Location
- Country: United States
- State: Alaska
- Borough: North Slope, Northwest Arctic

Physical characteristics
- Source: Imakturok Pass
  - location: Brooks Range, Northwest Arctic Borough
  - coordinates: 67.8691°N 155.2875°W
- Mouth: Etivluk River
  - location: 25 miles (40 km) northwest of Howard Pass, North Slope Borough
  - coordinates: 68.5408°N 156.4533°W
- Length: 70 mi (110 km)

The Nigu River is a 70-mile (110 km) tributary of the Etivluk River in the U.S. state of Alaska. Arising on the north slope of the Brooks Range just west of Gates of the Arctic National Park and Preserve, the Nigu flows generally northwest to meet the Etivluk about 25 miles (40 km) northwest of Howard Pass. The Nigu flows through some of the most remote locations in northern Alaska for its entire length.

== See also ==
- List of rivers of Alaska
