= Chockalog River =

River in Massachusetts and Rhode Island, United States

Chockalog Chockalaug
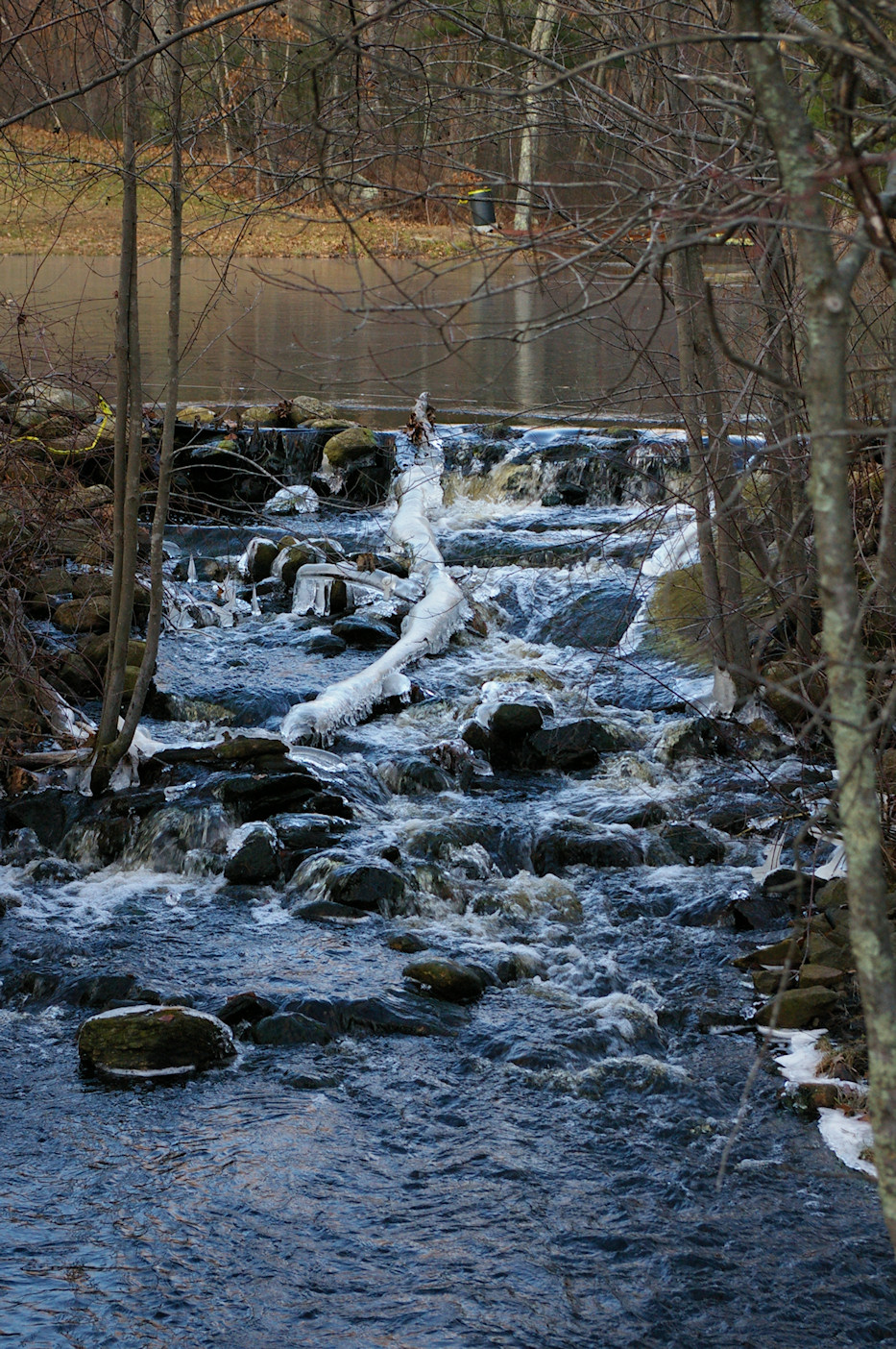
- Brook Road crossing upstream view

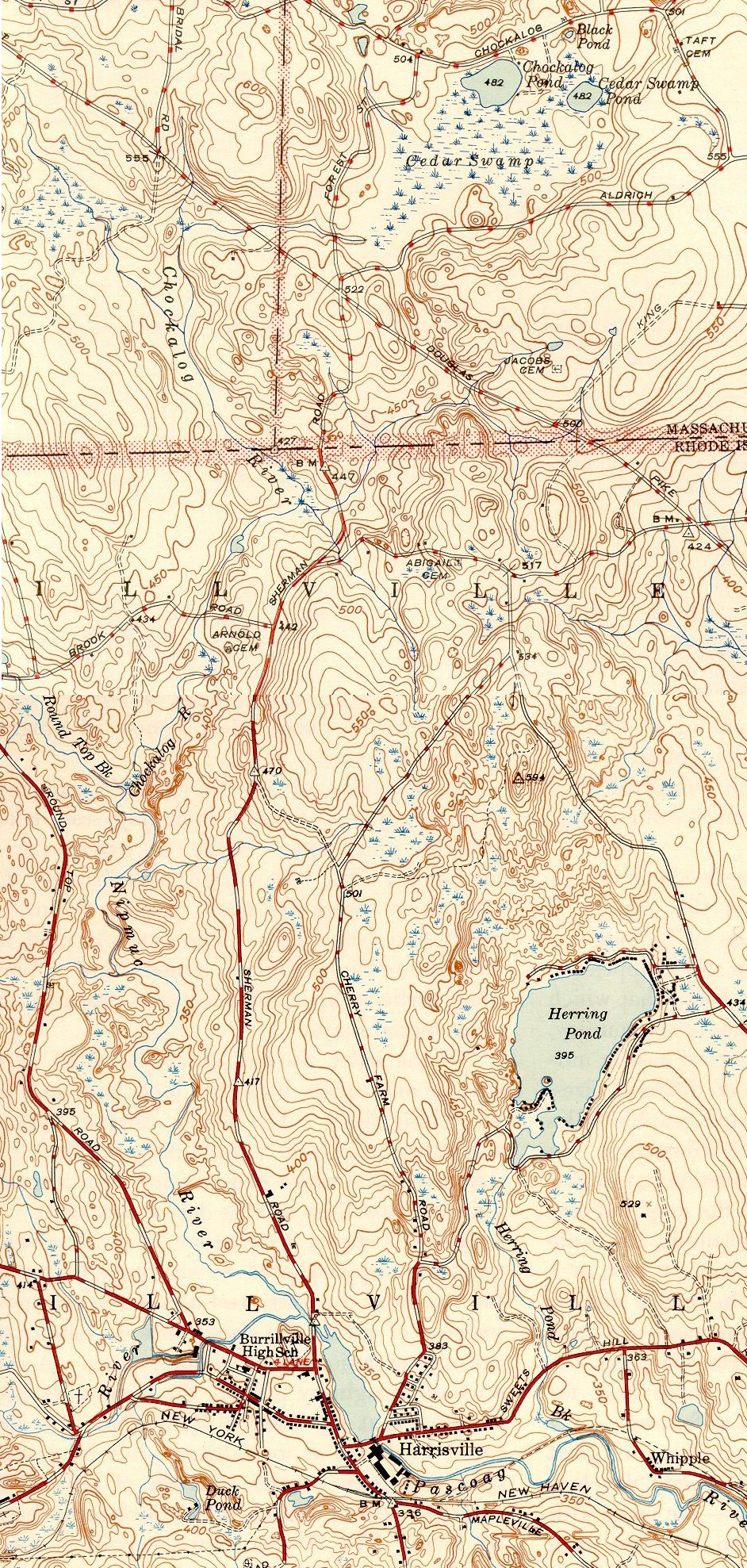
- Chockalog River and environs
- Etymology: Algonquian for fox place

Location
- Country: United States
- State: Massachusetts, Rhode Island

Physical characteristics
- Source confluence: Greene and Cedar Swamp Brooks
  - coordinates: 42°1′4″N 71°41′11″W
  - elevation: 439 ft (134 m)
- Mouth: Nipmuc River
  - coordinates: 41°59′45″N 71°41′24″W
  - elevation: 377 ft (115 m)
- Length: 2.2 mi (3.5 km)

The Chockalog River is a river in the U.S. states of Massachusetts and Rhode Island. It flows approximately 4 km (2 mi). Its name is said to mean "fox place".

== Course ==
The river is formed in Douglas, Massachusetts by the confluence of Greene and Cedar Swamp brooks. From there, it flows south to Burrillville, Rhode Island where it converges with Round Top Brook to form the Nipmuc River.

== Crossings ==
Brook Road in Burrillville is the only crossing over the Chockalog River due to its short length.

== Tributaries ==
The Chockalog River has no named tributaries, though it has many unnamed streams that also feed it.

== See also ==
- List of rivers of Massachusetts
- List of rivers of Rhode Island
