= Walker Creek (Michigan) =

Stream in Michigan, United States

Coordinates: 43.70031°N 84.98836°W

Walker Creek, also known as the Walker River, is a 12.0-mile-long (19.3 km) stream in Isabella County, Michigan, in the United States. It is a trout stream; the main trout species is the brook trout. The river also supports a small population of suckers. The stream is fairly small and of variable depth. Its shore is difficult to access because of the thick vegetation growing along the river. The stream rises in northwest Isabella County and flows southeast into the Lake of the Hills and the Coldwater River.
