= Cutler River (New Hampshire) =

- The Cutler River approaching Pinkham Notch

- Location within New Hampshire Location within the United States

Location
- Country: United States
- State: New Hampshire
- County: Coos
- Region: White Mountains

Physical characteristics
- Source
  - location: Huntington Ravine
  - coordinates: 44°16′31″N 71°17′26″W
  - elevation: 5,266 ft (1,605 m)
- Mouth: Ellis River
  - location: Pinkham Notch
  - coordinates: 44°15′17″N 71°15′8″W
  - elevation: 2,008 ft (612 m)
- Length: 2.6 mi (4.2 km), southeast

Basin features
- River system: Saco River watershed
- Tributaries
  - right: Western branch from Tuckerman Ravine; New River

The Cutler River is a stream located in the White Mountains of New Hampshire in the United States.

Approximately 2.6 miles (4.2 km) in length, it is a tributary of the Ellis River, part of the Saco River watershed flowing to the Atlantic Ocean in Maine.

The river rises as two branches on the eastern slopes of Mount Washington, the highest peak in the northeastern United States. The western branch, identified as the main stem by some sources, begins in Tuckerman Ravine. The northern branch, shown as the main stem by the U.S. Geological Survey, flows out of Huntington Ravine. The two branches join approximately 0.5 miles (0.8 km) east of the Hermit Lake structures in Tuckerman Ravine, and the river continues east down the side of Mount Washington, dropping over Crystal Cascade, and joining the Ellis River at the base of the mountain in Pinkham Notch.

== See also ==
- List of rivers of New Hampshire
