= Indian River (Manistique River tributary) =

River in Michigan, United States

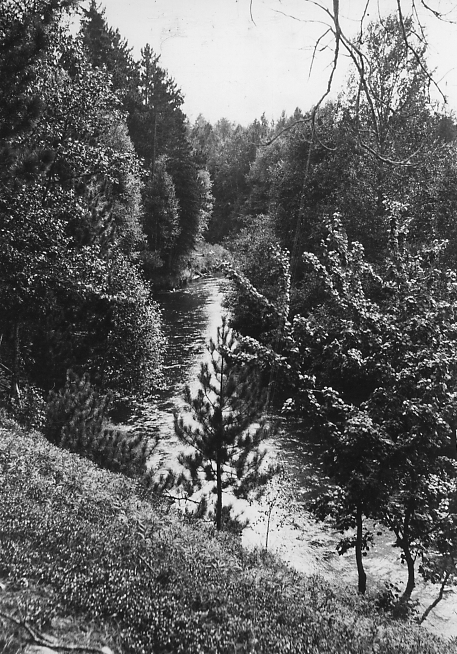

Location
- Country: United States

Physical characteristics
- Source
  - location: Au Train Township, Alger County, Michigan
- Mouth
  - location: Manistique River near Manistique, Schoolcraft County, Michigan
  - elevation: 600 feet (180 m)

National Wild and Scenic River
- Type: Scenic, Recreational
- Designated: March 3, 1992

Indian River is a 59.1-mile-long (95.1 km) tributary of the Manistique River on the Upper Peninsula of Michigan in the United States. It rises out of Hovey Lake at on Hiawatha National Forest land in Alger County and flows south and east through a lake district and on through Schoolcraft County. The river flows into the 8,659 acre (35 km^{2}) Indian Lake at and flows out at . It then flows east and south about 2.5 miles where it merges with the Manistique River, which then flows through Manistique and into Lake Michigan at .

Major tributaries include the Little Indian River, Murphy Creek, Big Murphy Creek, and Smith Creek.

The Indian River is a National Wild and Scenic River, with 12 miles (19 km) designated "Scenic" and 39 miles (63 km) designated "Recreational". This river is popular with paddlers although the section from Hovey Lake to Doe Lake is not maintained for canoes or kayaks and requires many portages. From Doe Lake to Indian Lake is periodically maintained for clear passage by the forest service, but portages may still be required due to the abundance of dead-falls.
