= Semem Creek =

Stream in Sanders County, Montana, U.S.

Coordinates: 47°47′19″N 115°00′30″W

- Location within Montana

Location
- Country: United States
- State: Montana
- County: Sanders County

Physical characteristics
- Mouth: Thompson River
  - location: Sanders County, Montana

Basin features
- River system: Thompson River watershed

Semem Creek is a stream in Sanders County, Montana, in the United States. It is a tributary of the Thompson River.

== See also ==
- List of rivers of Montana
