= Flat River Reservoir =

- Location within Rhode Island Location within the United States
- Location: Kent County, Rhode Island
- Coordinates: 41°41′47″N 71°36′24″W
- Type: Artificial lake
- Basin countries: United States
- Max. depth: 30 ft (9 m)
- Surface elevation: 246 ft (75 m)

Flat River Reservoir is a large lake in Kent County, Rhode Island.

== See also ==
- List of lakes in Rhode Island
