= Haigler Creek =

Waterway in Gila County, Arizona

Coordinates: 34°14′14″N 110°57′42″W

Location
- Country: United States
- State: Arizona

Physical characteristics
- Source
  - elevation: 5,800 ft (1,800 m)
- Mouth
  - elevation: 4,000 ft (1,200 m)

Haigler Creek is located in the Mogollon Rim area of the state of Arizona. The closest town, Young, is 14 miles (23 km) away. The facilities are maintained by Tonto National Forest division of the USDA Forest Service.

== Fish species ==
- Rainbow trout
- Brown trout
