= Little Indian River (Michigan) =

River in Michigan, United States

The Little Indian River is a 12.8-mile-long (20.6 km) river on the Upper Peninsula of the U.S. state of Michigan. It rises in a small lake on Hiawatha National Forest land in Alger County, Michigan at 46°18′02″N 86°38′12″W, flows through a lake district, then on through Schoolcraft County, and into the Indian River at 46°11′24″N 86°31′35″W.

Most of its course roughly parallels that of the Indian River a few miles to the south and west. The only major tributary is Grassy Creek, aside from the outflows of several small lakes.
