= Thornapple River (Wisconsin) =

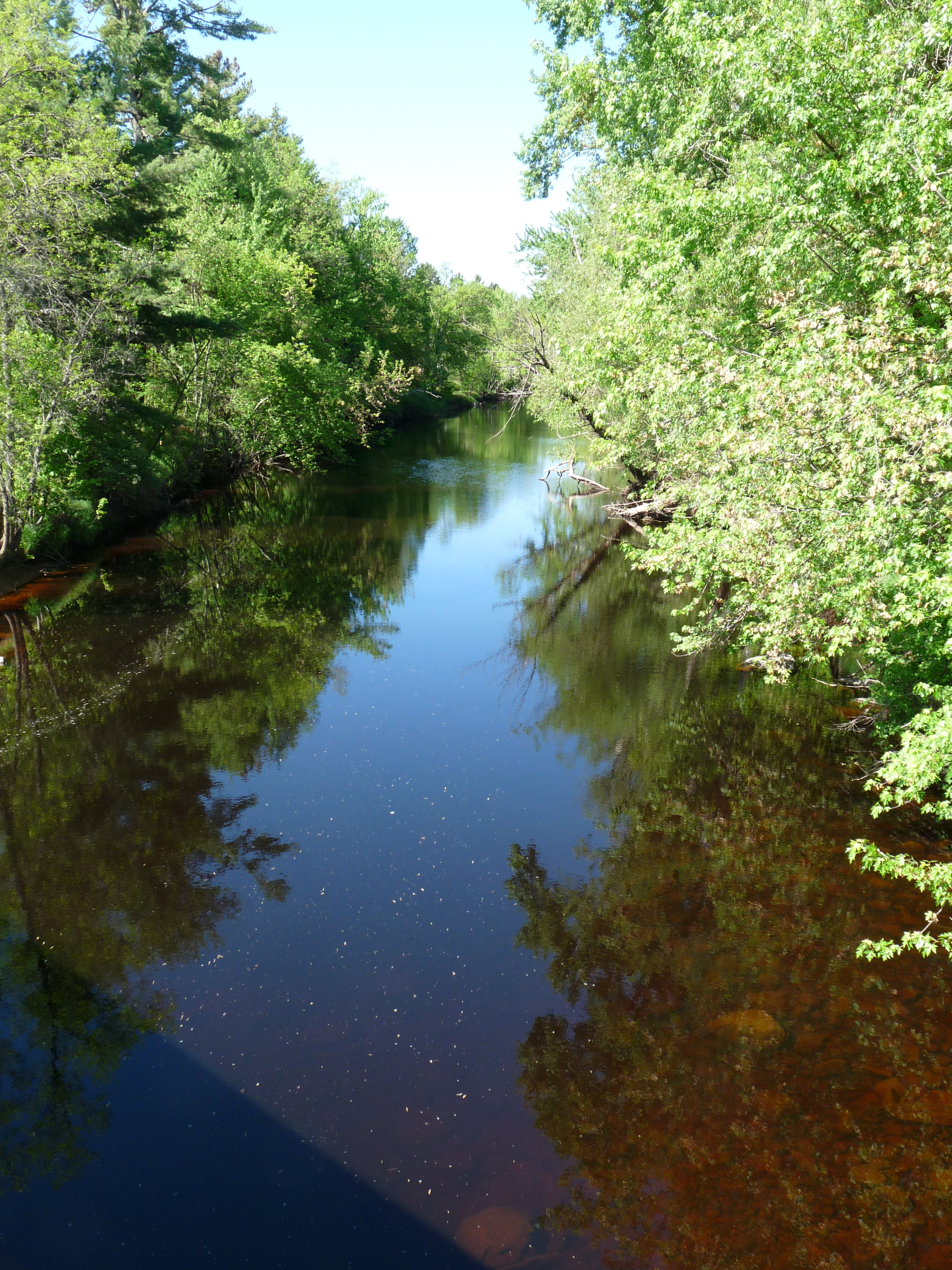
- Looking downstream (west) from the bridge on highway 27

Location
- Country: United States

Physical characteristics
- Source
  - location: NE Sawyer County, Wisconsin in Chequamegon National Forest
- Mouth
  - location: Chippewa River near Bruce, Wisconsin
  - elevation: 1,060 ft (320 m)

Basin features
- River system: Mississippi River

Thornapple River is a small river in Sawyer and Rusk counties in the U.S. state of Wisconsin.

The Thornapple rises in northeast Sawyer County in the Chequamegon National Forest at 45°56′21″N 90°45′29″W. It flows primarily south-southwest into the Chippewa River near Bruce at 45°27′40″N 91°15′09″W.

Among the tributaries of the Thornapple, there are two streams named Little Thornapple River. One is a right-side tributary entirely within Sawyer County near the boundary with Rusk County, flowing from 45°40′17″N 90°52′31″W primarily to the west and slightly south into the Thornapple River at 45°39′09″N 90°58′52″W. The other Little Thornapple River is a left-side tributary that rises in southern Sawyer County at 45°38′30″N 91°01′39″W, less than 2 miles (3.2 km) west-southwest of the mouth of the other Little Thornapple River. The second Little Thornapple, flows primarily to the south and southwest into Rusk County and empties into the Thornapple River at 45°30′04″N 91°10′56″W, approximately 4 miles (6.4 km) from the mouth of the Thornapple near Bruce.

== Recreation ==
Largely undeveloped, the river is home to wood ducks and mergansers, and is a spawning-ground for sturgeon. The lower part of the river can be canoeing and kayaked when water levels are medium.

== See also ==
- See Logging on the Chippewa for an overview of 19th century logging in the Chippewa watershed.
