= Reedy Meadow Brook =

Tributary stream in Massachusetts

Reedy Meadow Brook is a stream in Middlesex County, in the U.S. state of Massachusetts. It is a tributary to the Nashua River.

Reedy Meadow Brook has its headwaters in the Reedy Meadow, from which it takes its name.
