= James Brook (Nashua River tributary) =

Stream in Middlesex County, Massachusetts, U.S.

James Brook is a stream in Middlesex County, in the U.S. state of Massachusetts. It is a tributary to the Nashua River.

James Brook was named after a local Indian.
