= Potanipo Pond =

Pond in New Hampshire, United States

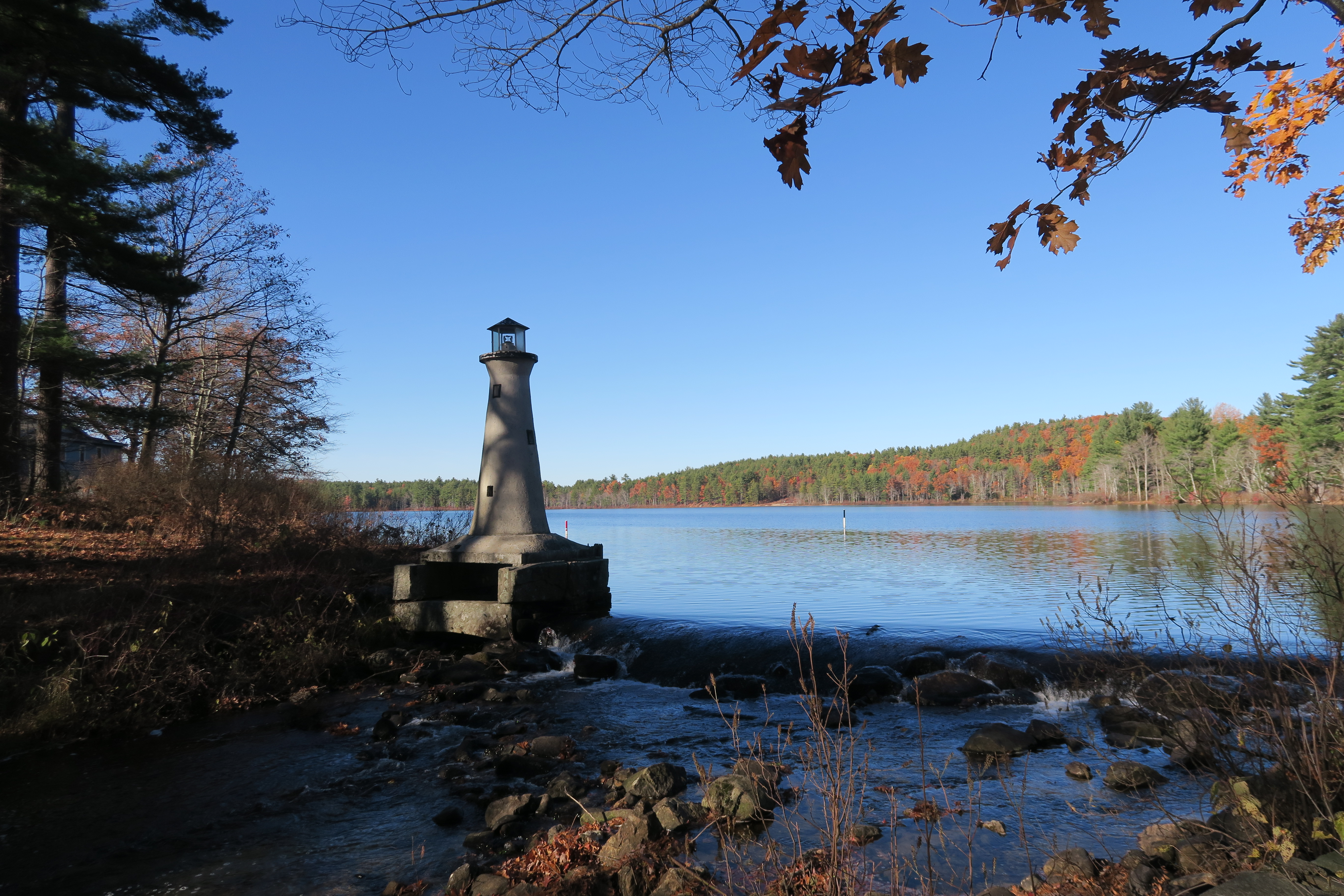
- Potanipo Pond

- Location within New Hampshire Location within the United States
- Location: Hillsborough County, New Hampshire
- Coordinates: 42°44′24″N 71°40′34″W
- Primary inflows: North Stream; Lancy Brook; Talbot Brook
- Primary outflows: Nissitissit River
- Basin countries: United States
- Max. length: 0.7 mi (1.1 km)
- Max. width: 0.5 mi (0.80 km)
- Surface area: 136 acres (0.55 km^{2})
- Average depth: 12 ft (3.7 m)
- Max. depth: 27 ft (8.2 m)
- Surface elevation: 264 ft (80 m)
- Settlements: Brookline

Potanipo Pond (also known Potanipo Lake or Lake Potanipo) is a 136-acre (55 ha) water body located in Hillsborough County in southern New Hampshire, United States, in the town of Brookline. Potanipo Pond is the source of the Nissitissit River, which flows via the Nashua River into the Merrimack River, and then to the Gulf of Maine.

The lake is classified as a warmwater fishery, with observed species including largemouth bass, chain pickerel, yellow perch, pumpkinseed, and horned pout.

== See also ==
- List of lakes in New Hampshire
- New Hampshire Historical Marker No. 271: Fresh Pond Ice Company
- Potanipo Hill
