= Pennichuck Brook =

Coordinates: 42°48′00″N 71°28′08″W

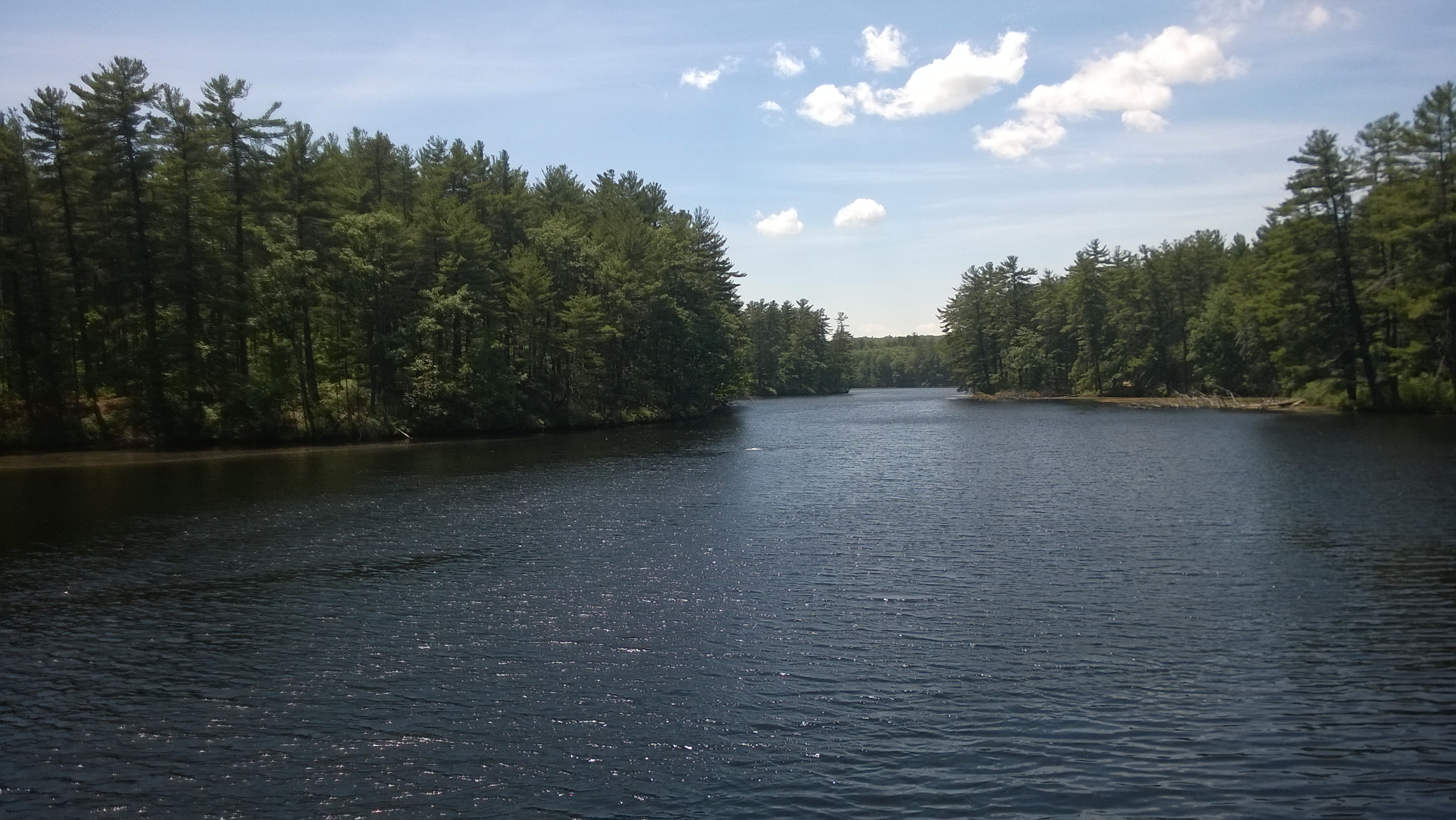
- Supply Pond, part of Pennichuck Brook before the Pennichuck Water Co. dam, near the mouth of the brook at the Merrimack River

Location
- Country: US

Physical characteristics
- Source
  - location: Silver Lake (Hollis, New Hampshire)
  - elevation: 102 feet (31 m) at Hollis, New Hampshire
- Mouth
  - location: Merrimack River

Pennichuck Brook is one of the tributaries of the Merrimack River in New Hampshire in the United States. Its watershed is 31 square miles (80 km^{2}) and is one of the 14 subwatersheds of the Merrimack River. It passes through Nashua and Merrimack, New Hampshire and serves as the public water supply for greater Nashua.

== Route description ==
Pennichuck Brook begins at Silver Lake in Hollis. It flows northeast under NH 122 and into Dunklee Pond, then continues northeast into Pennichuck Pond, on the boundary between Hollis and Nashua. Leaving Pennichuck Pond, it becomes the boundary between Nashua and the town of Merrimack, flowing northeast under Amherst Street (NH 101A), then turning east and flowing into Holts Pond and Bowers Pond. While part of Bowers Pond, it is crossed by the Everett Turnpike. Past the outlet of Bowers Pond, the brook drops into Harris Pond and Supply Pond, then goes under the Daniel Webster Highway (U.S. Route 3) before it flows into the Merrimack River. All of these water bodies are dammed. The brook runs roughly parallel to the Nashua River from Pennichuck Pond to the brook's mouth in Nashua.

== See also ==
- List of rivers of New Hampshire
