= Silver Lake State Park =

Silver Lake State Park is the name of several parks in the United States:

- Silver Lake State Park (New York)
- Silver Lake State Park (New Hampshire)
- Silver Lake State Park (Michigan)
- Silver Lake State Park (Texas)
- Silver Lake State Park (Vermont)
