= Nissitissit River =

River in New Hampshire and Massachusetts, United States

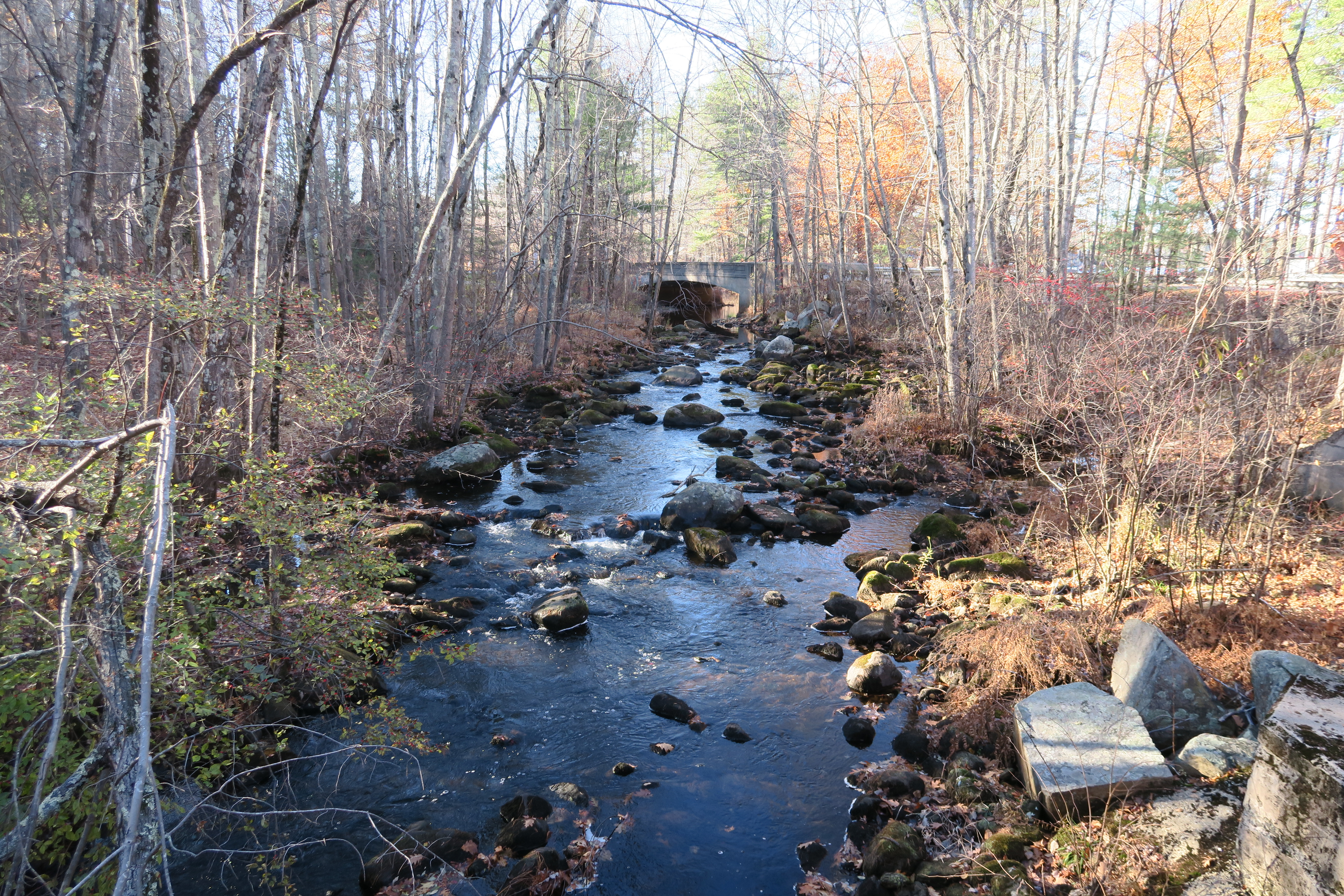
- Nissitissit River in Brookline, New Hampshire

- Location within New Hampshire Location within Massachusetts Location within the United States

Location
- Country: United States
- States: New Hampshire, Massachusetts
- Counties: Hillsborough, NH, Middlesex, MA
- Towns: Brookline & Hollis, NH; Pepperell, MA

Physical characteristics
- Source: Potanipo Pond
  - location: Brookline, NH
  - coordinates: 42°44′10″N 71°40′20″W
  - elevation: 264 ft (80.5 m)
- Mouth: Nashua River
  - location: Pepperell, MA
  - coordinates: 42°40′18″N 71°33′53″W
  - elevation: 168 ft (51 m)
- Length: 10.5 mi (16.9 km)

National Wild and Scenic River
- Type: Scenic
- Designated: March 12, 2019

The Nissitissit River is a 10.5-mile-long (16.9 km) river in southern New Hampshire and northern Massachusetts in the United States. It is a tributary of the Nashua River, itself a tributary of the Merrimack River, which flows to the Gulf of Maine. This river is part of the Nashua River Watershed.

The Nissitissit River begins at the outlet of Potanipo Pond in the town of Brookline, New Hampshire. It flows southeast at a very mild gradient, crossing the southwest corner of Hollis, New Hampshire, before entering Massachusetts, where it joins the Nashua River in the town of Pepperell.

== See also ==
- List of rivers of Massachusetts
- List of rivers of New Hampshire
