= Quinapoxet River =

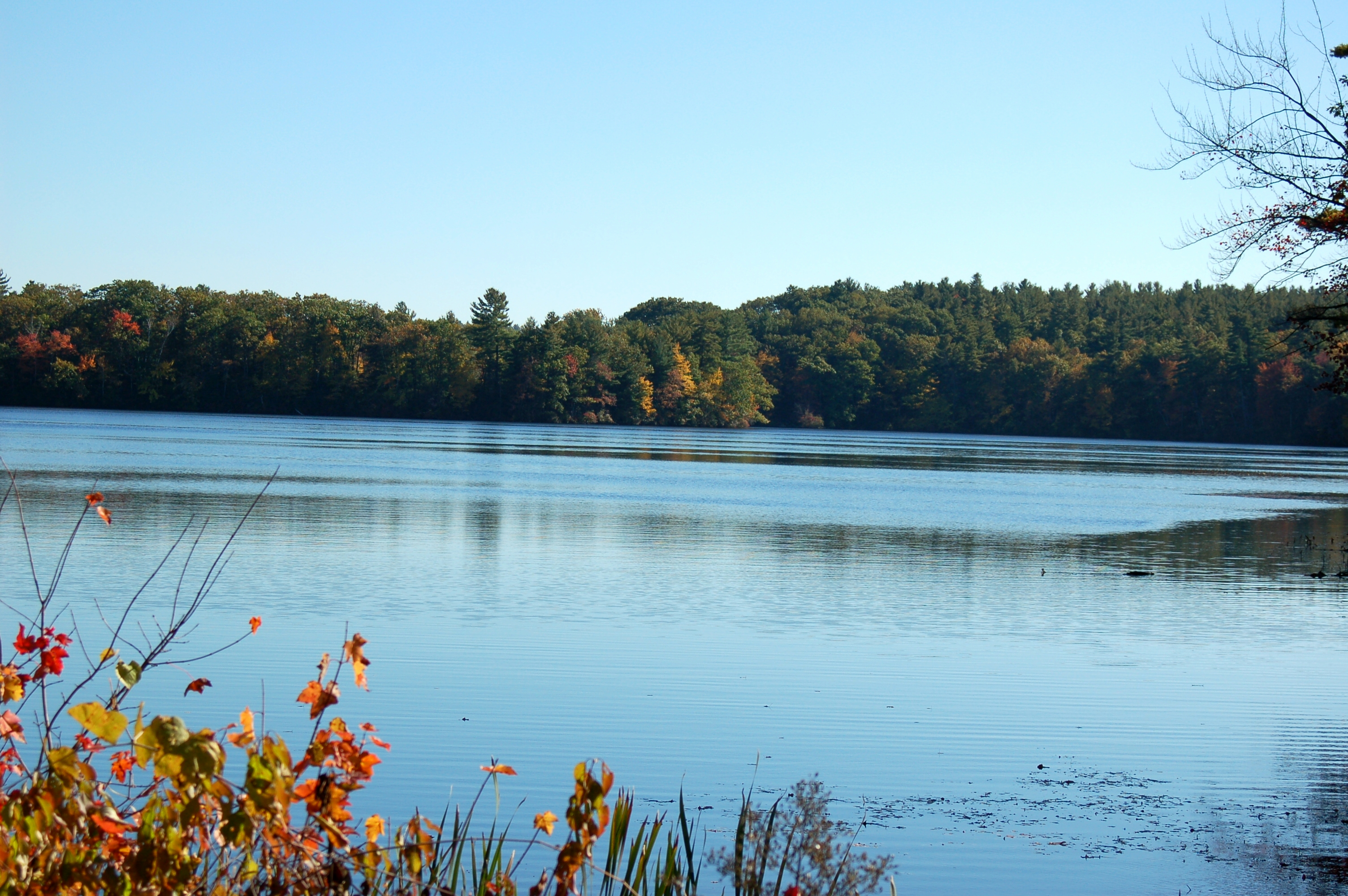
- View from Princeton Road in Holden

Physical characteristics
- Source
  - location: Princeton, Massachusetts
  - coordinates: 42.396°N 71.883°W
  - elevation: 802 ft (244 m)
- Mouth
  - location: Wachusett Reservoir
  - coordinates: 42.385°N 71.797°W
  - elevation: 384 ft (117 m)
- Length: 7.9 mi (12.7 km)
- Basin size: 57 mi^{2} (150 km^{2})
- Discharge
  - average: 88 cu ft/s (2.5 m^{3}/s)

Basin features
- Tributaries
  - left: Trout Brook

The Quinapoxet River is part of the Nashua River watershed in northern Massachusetts in the United States. It is part of the Massachusetts Water Resources Authority water system supplying drinking water to the greater Boston area.

The river's name derives from the Nipmuc language, meaning "at the place of the little long pond" or "the long swamp."

The uppermost tributaries of the Quinapoxet River rise in the town of Princeton, Massachusetts, the watershed generally known as the Upper Worcester Plateau, or the Monadnock Upland. This watershed tops at Wachusett Mountain, the highest feature in the area. Water flowing east from this high ground feeds the Nashua River watershed, and water flowing west feeds the Ware River or the Millers River watersheds, heading to the Connecticut River.

The Quinapoxet Dam in Holden impounds 1,100.0 million US gallons in the Quinapoxet Reservoir, a Worcester drinking water supply. Below the dam, the Quinapoxet River flows 7.9 miles (12.7 km) east to the Wachusett Reservoir, joining the Stillwater River (to become the south branch of the Nashua River) in the Oakdale section of West Boylston. The city of Worcester can divert up to 36% of the Quinapoxet River water. The outflow is not adjustable, so the reservoir only supplies excess water to the Quinapoxet River.

Near the Eastern end of the Quinapoxet River in West Boylston, another dam also referred to as the Quinapoxet Dam was completed circa 1905 as part of the construction of the Wachusett Reservoir. The Quinapoxet Dam was an earthen dam with a concrete spillway whose purpose was to help settle silt and sediment flowing downstream before it could enter the reservoir. In 2022, the MWRA announced plans to remove the deteriorating dam and restore the river to free-flowing status as far back as the Quinapoxet Reservoir dam in Holden. Preparations for the dam removal included the relocation of over 1,600 freshwater mussels from the immediate area around the dam to locations upstream. Removal of the dam was begun in November 2024 and completed in 2025, with a ribbon-cutting ceremony celebrating its completion in September 2025.

The Quinapoxet and Stillwater rivers are the two major tributaries to the Wachusett Reservoir, which serves as the primary source of water for 2.5 million consumers in 43 communities of central and eastern Massachusetts. The U.S. Geological Survey, in cooperation with the Massachusetts Department of Conservation and Recreation, operates stream-flow monitoring gages near the mouths of both rivers. This and other continuous monitoring serves to maintain the overall quality of water within the reservoir. The water of these tributaries to the Wachusett Reservoir has been of high quality for decades.

About 35% of the Quinapoxet sub-basin is protected open space (Worcester reservoirs' surface water included). The City of Worcester owns the land that immediately surrounds each of its reservoirs and approximately 25% of its entire water supply watershed. It is a highly protected forest with no public access. Furthermore, the Massachusetts Water Resource Authority (MWRA) owns much of the land. The Town of Holden owns over 600 acres (2.4 km^{2}) as the Trout Brook Conservation Area, and the Massachusetts Audubon Society owns several hundred acres in the Wachusett Meadow Wildlife Sanctuary, in addition to other properties within this sub-basin.

The lower Quinapoxet rates on alert for biology, chemistry and hydrology. Chaffins Brook is considered a "moderately septic polluted stream", and its lower reach has noxious aquatic plants in an impoundment. Trout Brook in Holden is considered to be high quality habitat and have limited disturbance. There are a number of medium yield aquifers surrounding Holden center, and to protect this resource the town has passed an aquifer protection bylaw.

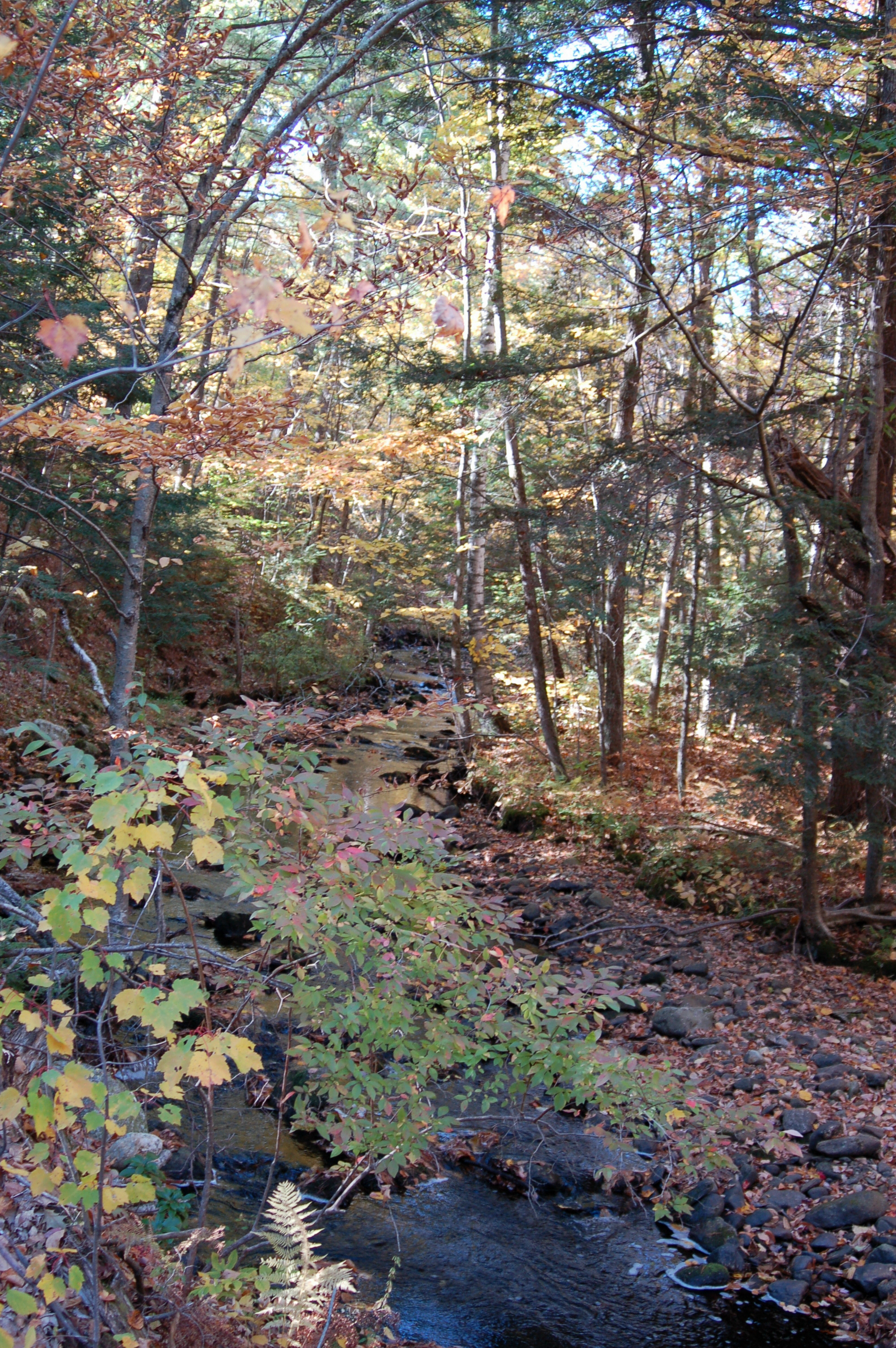
The headwaters of the Quinapoxet River

== See also ==
- List of rivers of Massachusetts
