= Wachusett Dam =

Dam in Massachusetts

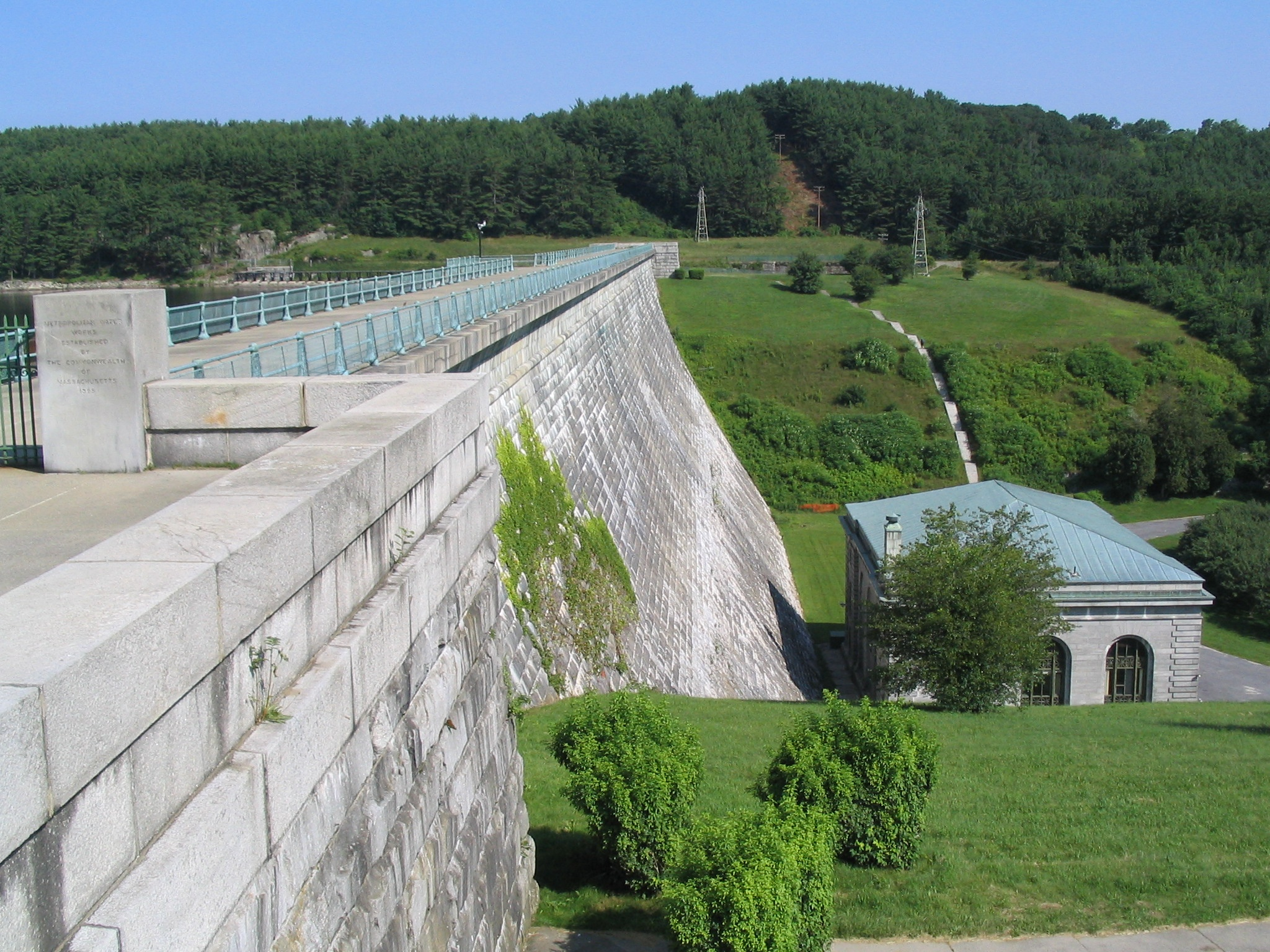
- Wachusett Dam at Clinton
- Interactive map of Wachusett Dam
- Official name: Wachusett Reservoir Dam
- Location: Clinton, Massachusetts, USA
- Coordinates: 42°24′13″N 71°41′16″W
- Construction began: 1897; 129 years ago
- Opening date: 1905; 121 years ago
- Operator: MWRA

Dam and spillways
- Impounds: Nashua River
- Height: 205 ft (62 m)
- Length: 965 ft (294 m)

Reservoir
- Creates: Wachusett Reservoir
- Wachusett Dam Historic District
- U.S. National Register of Historic Places
- U.S. Historic district
- Location within Massachusetts Location within the United States
- Location: Clinton, Massachusetts
- Architect: Shepley, Rutan and Coolidge; Olmsted Brothers
- MPS: Water Supply System of Metropolitan Boston MPS
- NRHP reference No.: 89002269
- Added to NRHP: January 18, 1990

The Wachusett Dam in Clinton, Massachusetts, impounds the Nashua River, creating the Wachusett Reservoir. Construction started in 1897 and was completed in 1905. It is part of the Nashua River Watershed.

This dam is part of greater Boston's water system, maintained and controlled by the Massachusetts Water Resources Authority (MWRA). It discharges into the Nashua River. When it was completed in 1905, the Wachusett Reservoir was the largest public water supply reservoir in the world. At that time, the Wachusett Reservoir Dam was the largest gravity dam in the world as well.

== Construction ==
The Metropolitan Water Board selected the south branch of the Nashua River in Clinton as the best site for Boston's new water supply over New Hampshire's Lake Winnipesaukee, Maine's Sebago Lake, and the Merrimack River.

Churches, factories, homes, and schools within the valley had to be knocked down or moved. Roads and rail lines had to be relocated; a railroad tunnel and trestle had to be built in order to relocate the Central Massachusetts Railroad, and over four thousand bodies had to be dug up and moved in the local Catholic cemetery. The project brought thousands of immigrants to the area for work.

The dam created the world's largest water supply reservoir at the time. It is still considered the largest "hand dug" dam in the world today.

== Early problems ==
A static liquefaction flow failure occurred in the upstream slope of the North Dike of Wachusett Dam near Clinton, Massachusetts on April 11, 1907 during the first reservoir filling. The fine sands of the upstream dike shell liquefied and flowed approximately 100 meters horizontally into the reservoir.

== Gallery ==
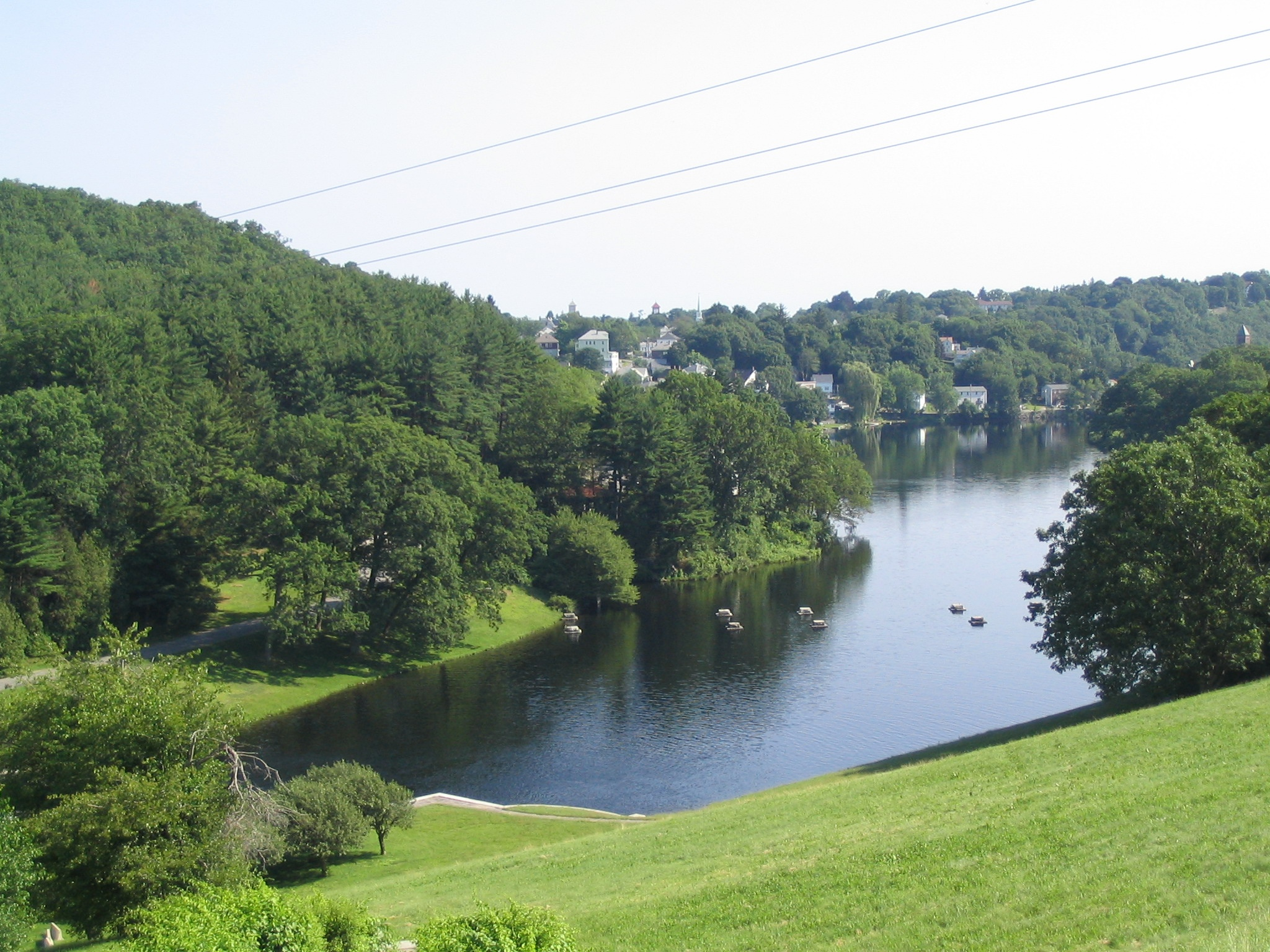
Wachusett Dam outlet

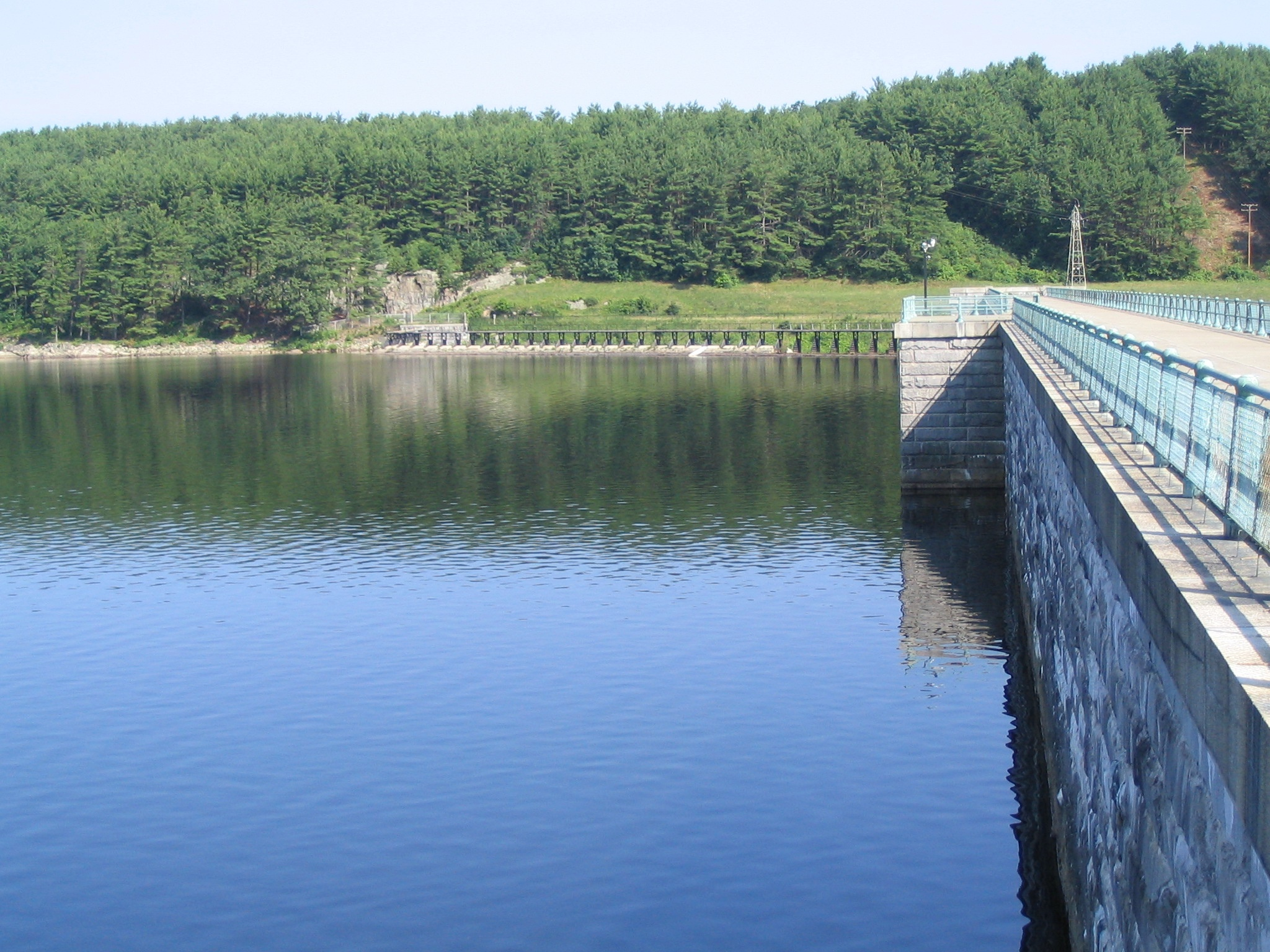
The reservoir side of the dam

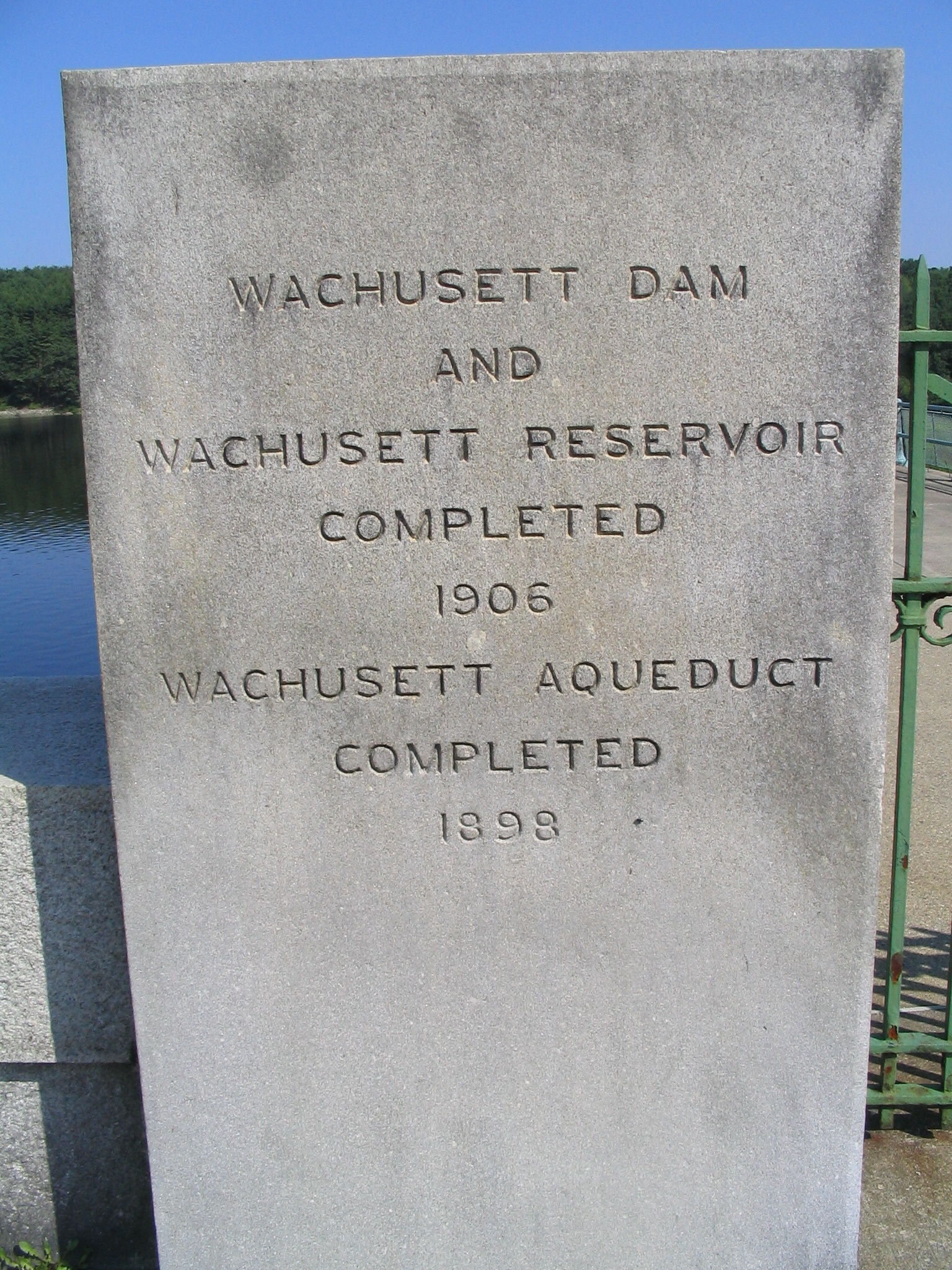
The plaque on the dam

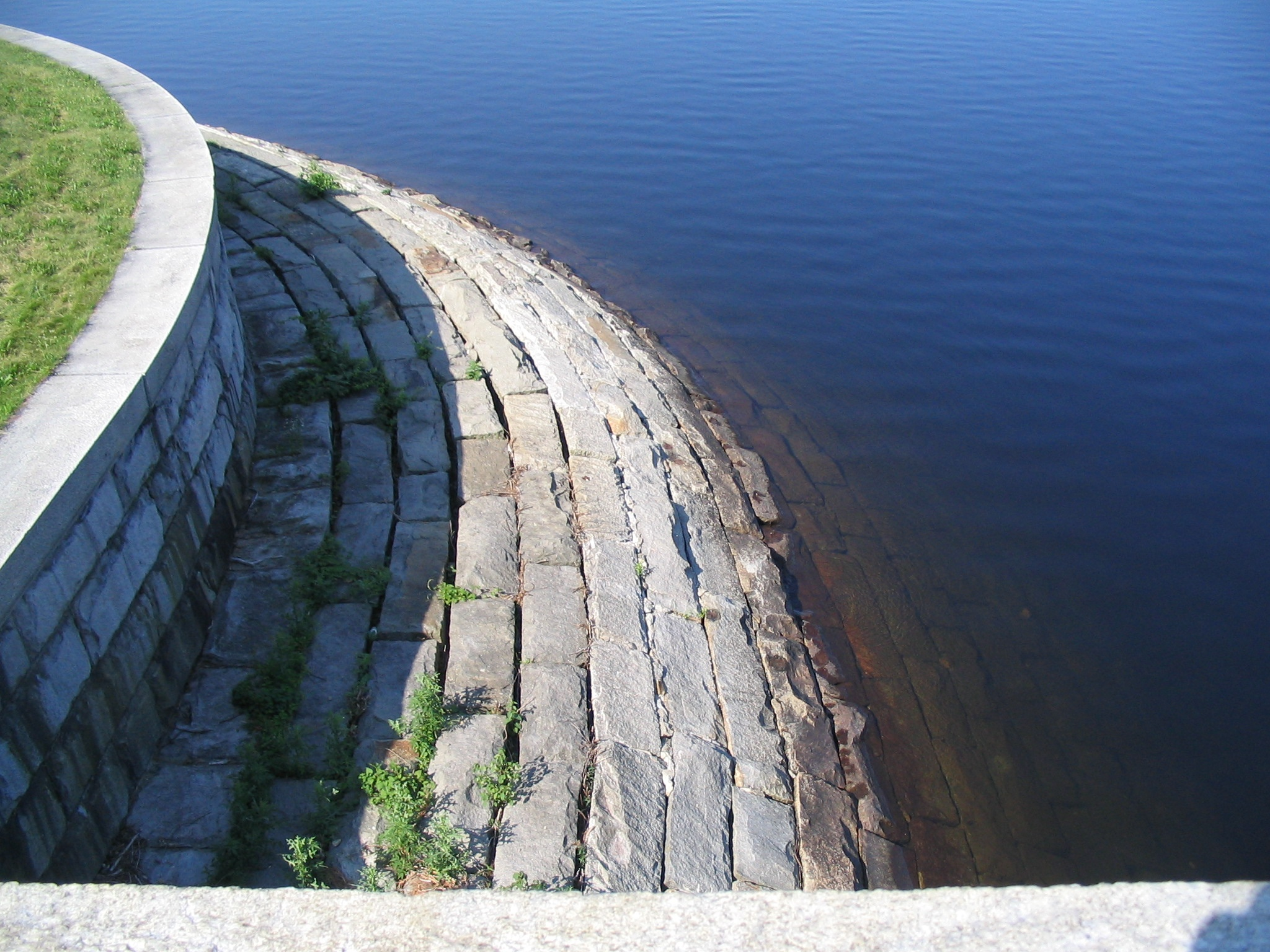
Rough-hewn rocks lining the reservoir

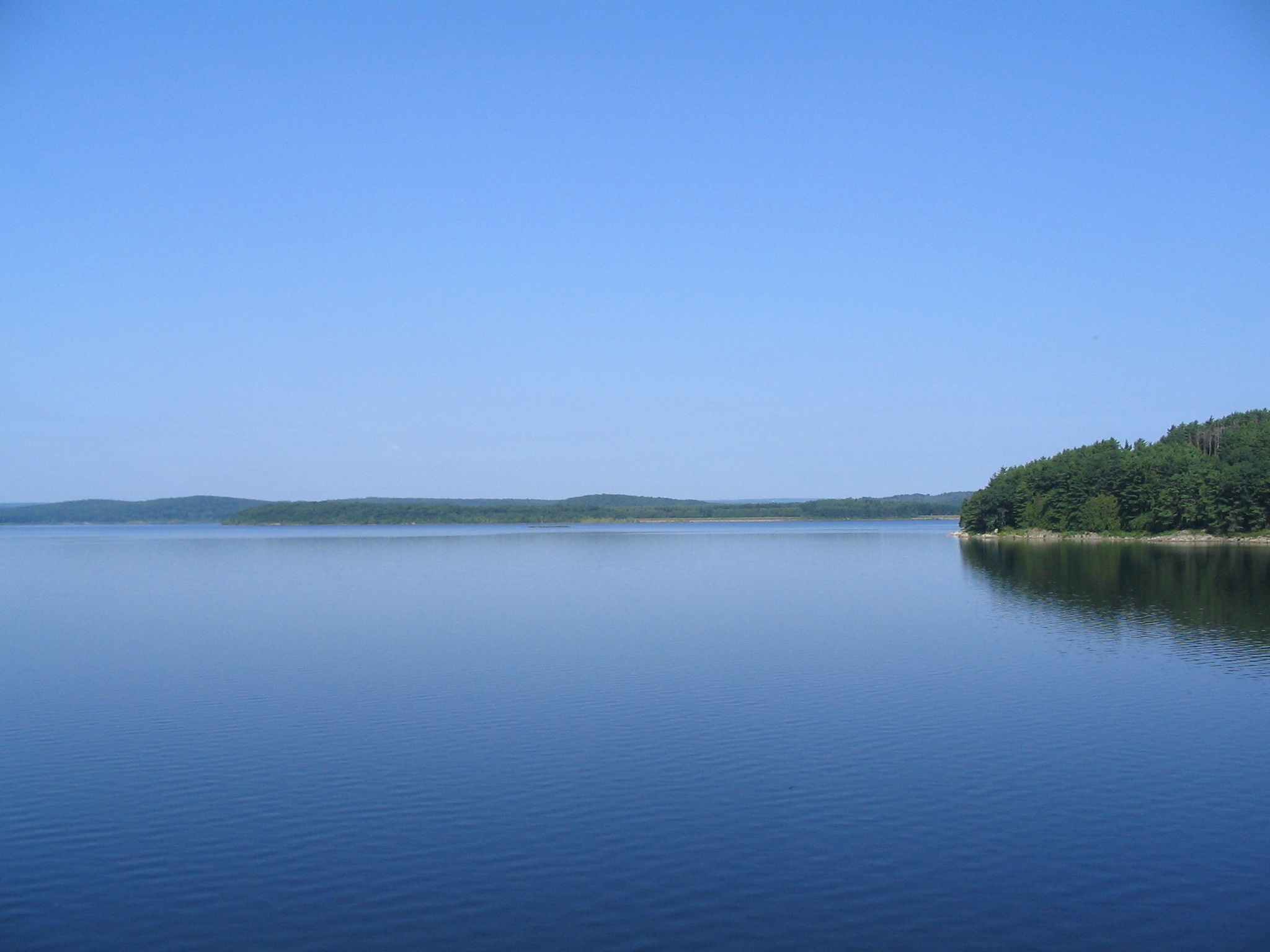
The reservoir itself

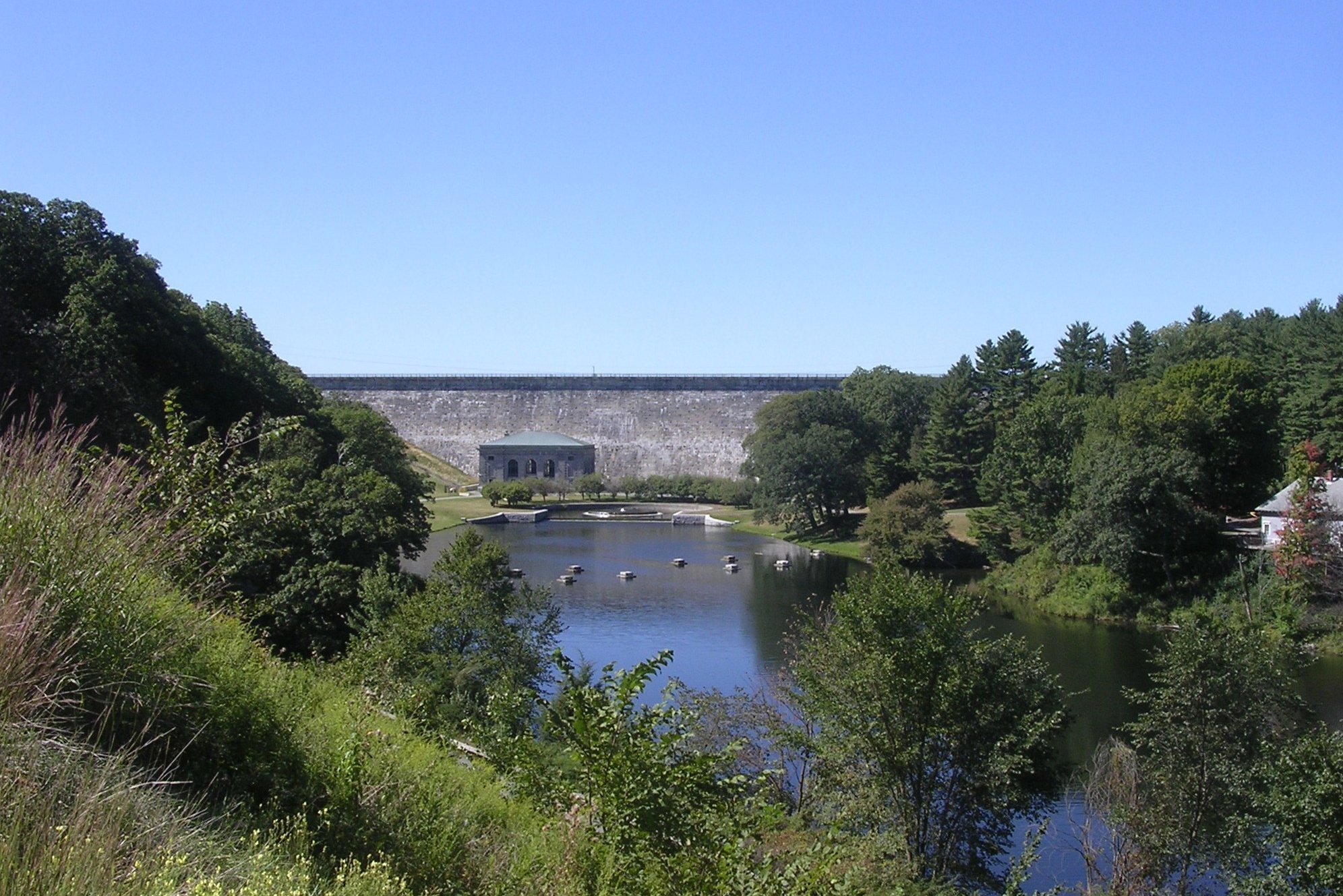
The dam from downstream

== See also ==
- Wachusett Aqueduct
- National Register of Historic Places listings in Worcester County, Massachusetts
