= Andres Institute of Art =

Sculpture park

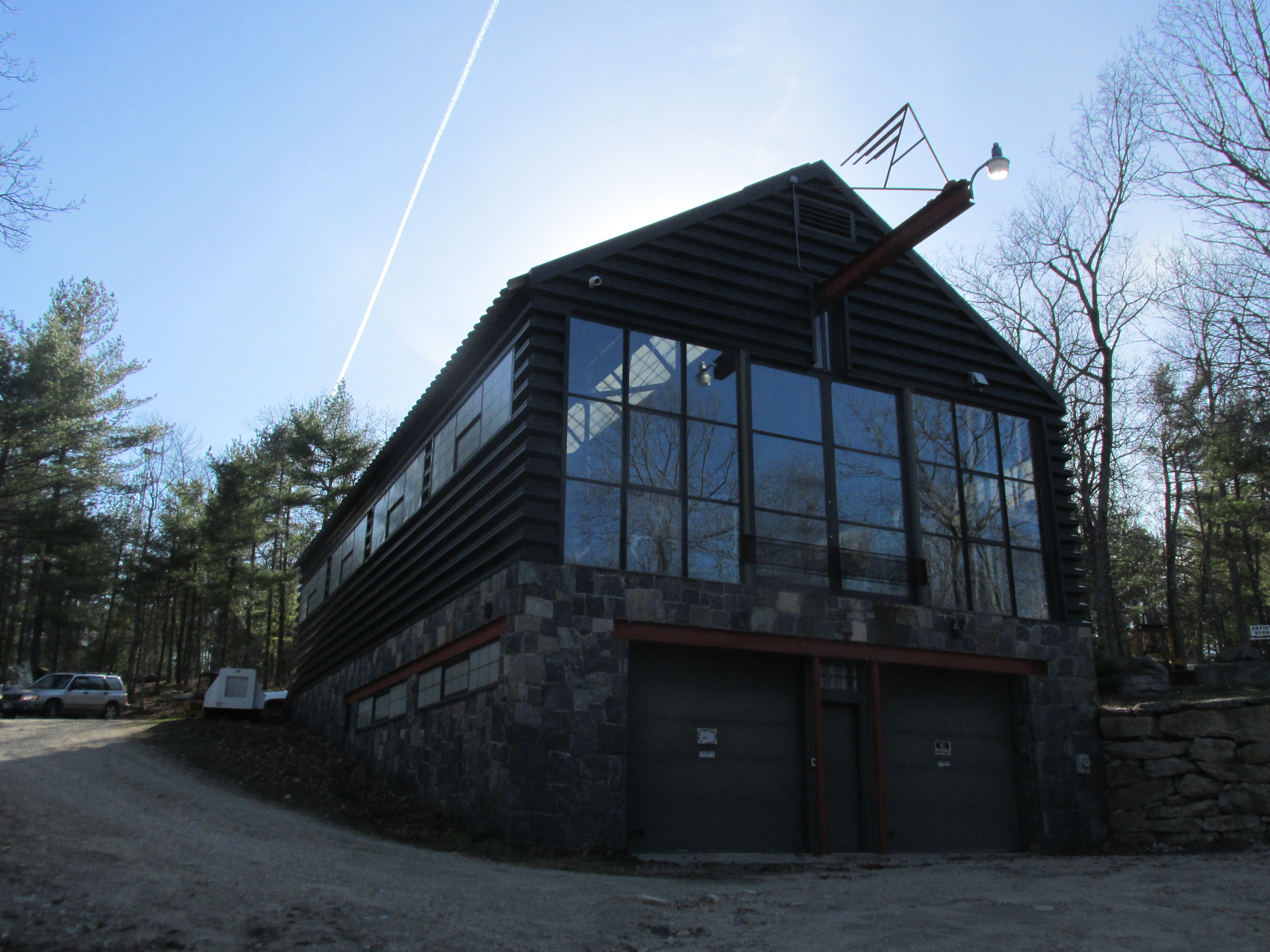
- Artists Studio
- Established: 1996
- Location: 98 Route 13; Brookline, New Hampshire
- Coordinates: 42°43′43″N 71°40′11″W
- Type: Sculpture park
- Website: http://andresinstitute.org

Andres Institute of Art is a non-profit arts organization that hosts a public sculpture park in Brookline, New Hampshire, United States, founded in 1996 by local benefactor Paul Andres and sculptor John Weidman. It is the largest sculpture park by area in New England,, with a collection of more than 100 metal and stone sculptures are distributed over 140 acres (57 ha) on Potanipo Hill, the site of a former ski area. The ski area initially started in the 1930's as the Brookline Ski tow, then became Musket Mountain and finally Big Bear Mountain. The former ski lodge now houses the Andres Institute of Art welcome center and on the second floor is the Big Bear Lodge performance center. Andres Institute of Art utilizes the Big Bear Lodge performance center to host regular concerts and musical performances from local and national touring acts.

The sculptures are situated in a variety of garden and forested situations, spread over eleven hiking trails on the hillside. The trails range from easy to difficult, and the views along them change drastically with the changing of the seasons. Most of the sculptures are abstract and cryptic pieces, with each year's accessions coming from both new artists and familiar ones. The trails lead visitors by works such as Contempo Rustic, a couch fashioned from slabs of rock and metal, or Mbari House, a house-shaped granite-and-metal totem to peace and friendship.

Andres Institute hosts regular Iron melts that are open to the public and sells sand molds that visitors can create their own designs allowing a custom, one-of-a-kind iron tile they can take home. Since 1998, the institute has sponsored an annual Bridges and Connections International Sculpture Symposium. Artists are invited to visit Brookline for two weeks to create sculptures for permanent display at the institute. Sculptors from Lithuania, Latvia, England, Czech Republic, Ukraine, Egypt, Greece, Chile, and many states of the U.S. have attended the event. As the artist's work, the public is invited to observe and interact with them, and to join guided tours of the collection.

== See also ==
- List of sculpture parks
- Sculpture trail
