= Trout Brook (Massachusetts) =

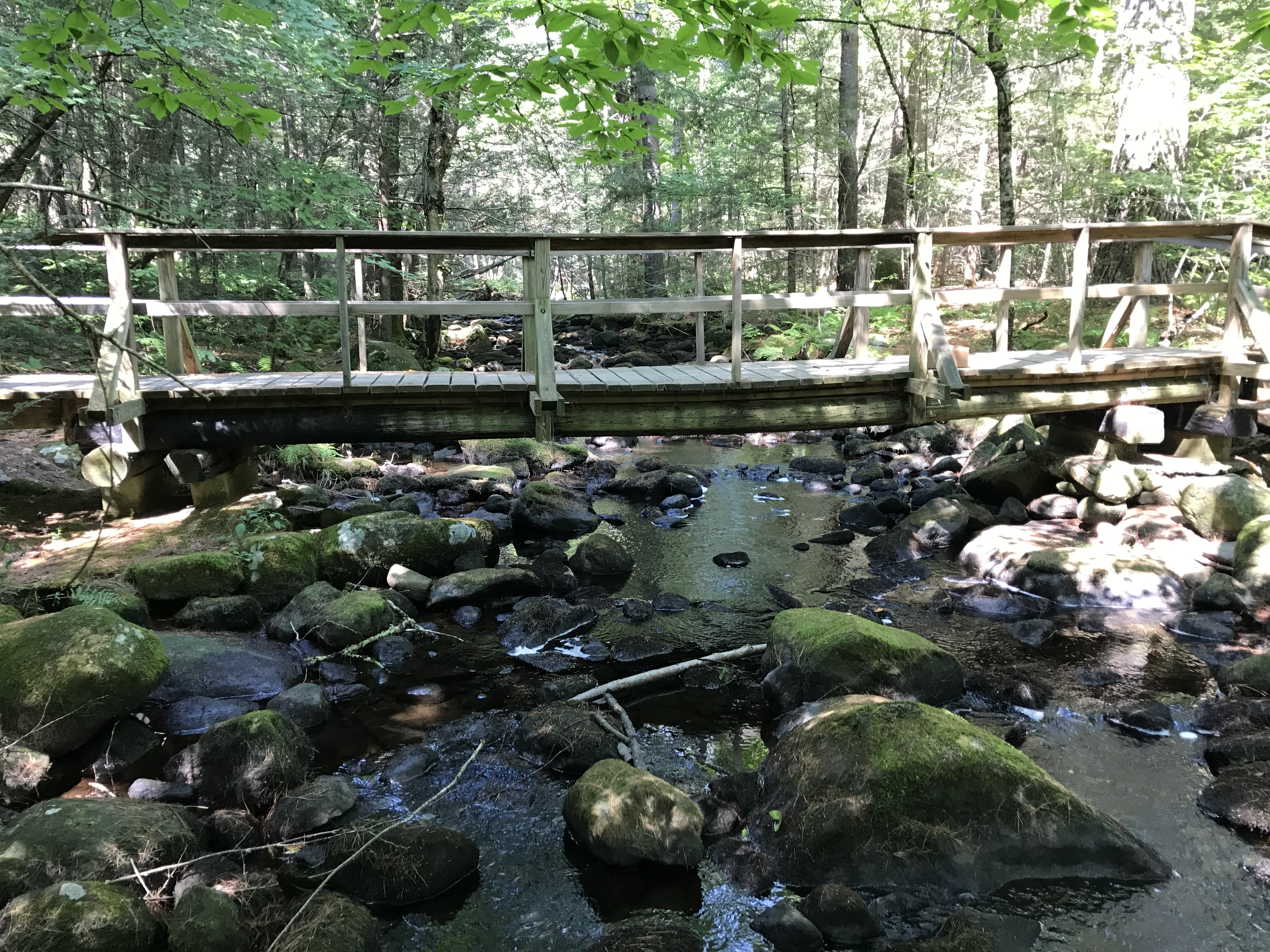
- Bridge over Trout Brook

Location
- Country: United States
- State: Massachusetts

Physical characteristics
- Mouth: Quinapoxet River
  - location: Holden, Massachusetts, United States
  - coordinates: 42°22′55″N 71°50′04″W
  - elevation: 522 ft (159 m)

Trout Brook, also called Ball Brook, is a cold water tributary of the Quinapoxet River located in Holden, Massachusetts. Trout Brook is stocked with trout each spring by the Massachusetts Fisheries and Wildlife Division. As the Quinapoxet River is part of the water supply for Worcester, Massachusetts, both the Quinapoxet and all of its major tributaries including Trout Brook are monitored by the USGS for water quality.

In addition to the periodic trout stocking by the Mass DFW, past electroshocking has determined that small native brook trout also live in Trout Brook.
