= Silver Lake State Park (New Hampshire) =

State park in New Hampshire, United States

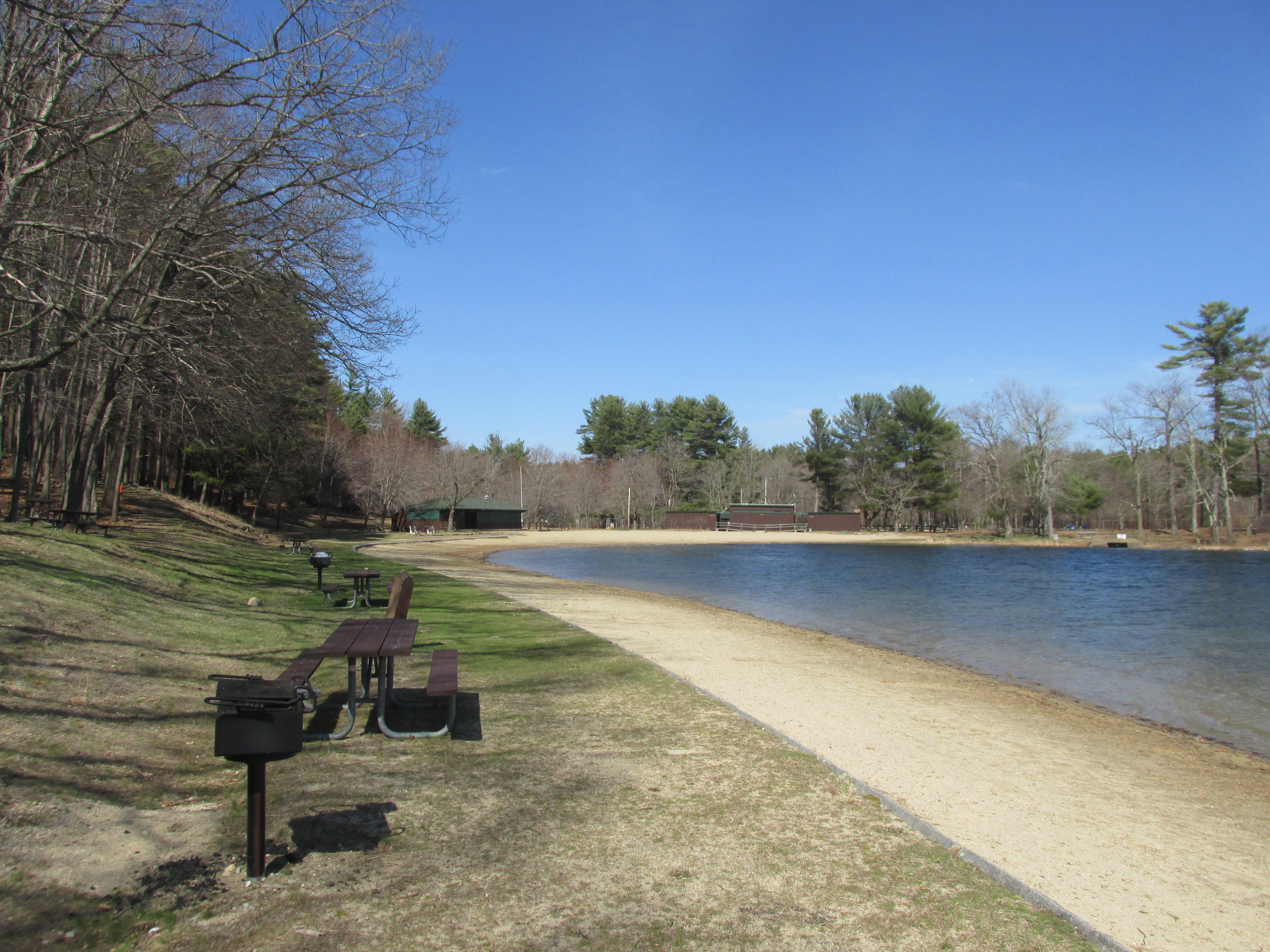

- Location within New Hampshire
- Interactive map of Silver Lake State Park
- Location: Hollis, New Hampshire, United States
- Coordinates: 42°45′45″N 71°35′36″W
- Area: 80 acres (32 ha)
- Elevation: 269 feet (82 m)
- Established: 1954
- Administrator: New Hampshire Division of Parks and Recreation
- Website: Official website
- New Hampshire State Parks

Silver Lake State Park is an 80-acre (32 ha) state park located along NH Route 122 on the northern shore of Silver Lake in the town of Hollis, New Hampshire. The park offers swimming at a sandy beach with a bathhouse, picnicking, and playground equipment, and the rental of kayaks and paddle boats.
