= Potanipo Hill =

Mountain in New Hampshire, United States

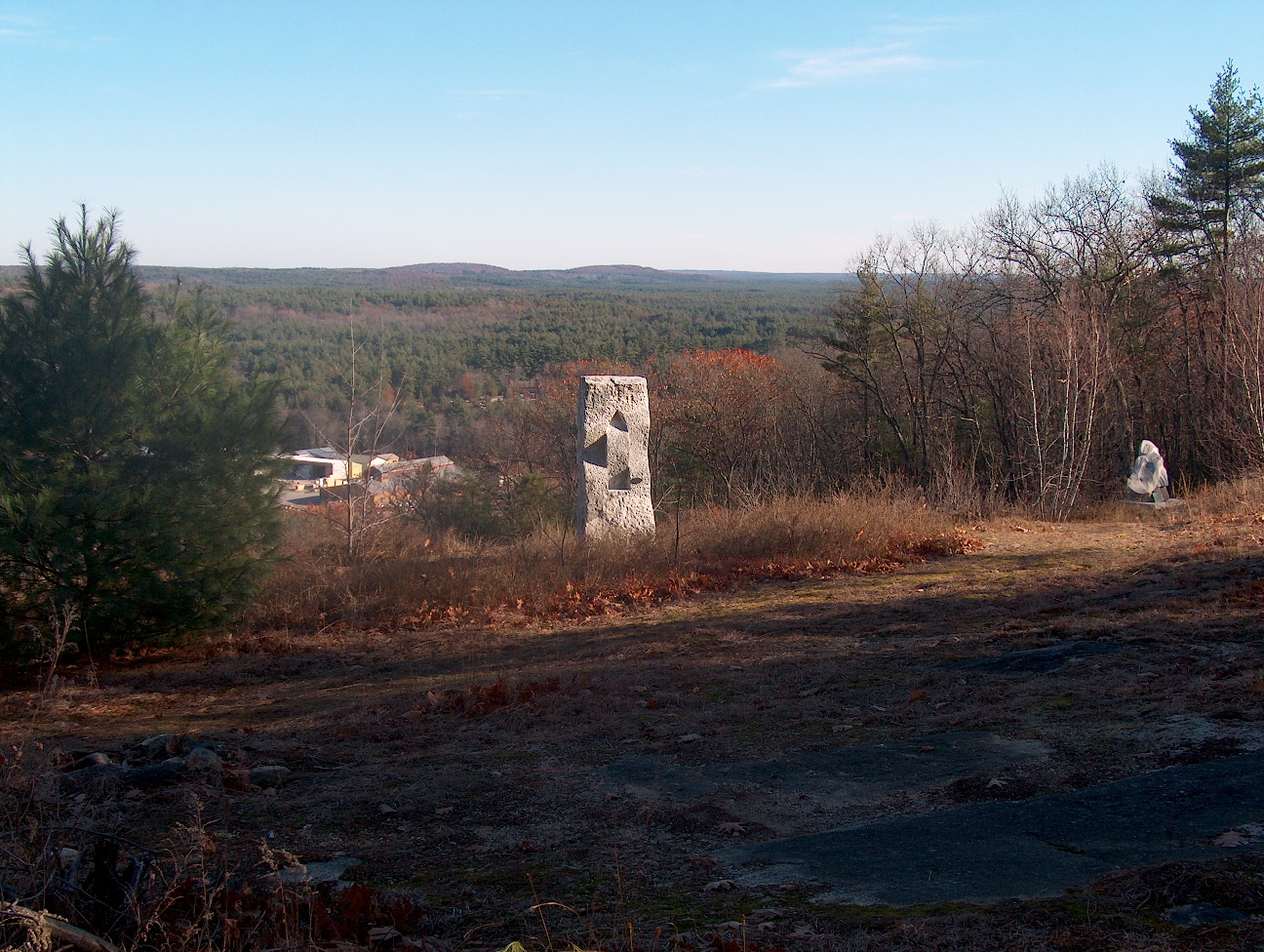
- November 2007 view from near the top of the old ski area, now Andres Institute of Art

Highest point
- Elevation: 613 ft (187 m)
- Coordinates: 42°43′38″N 71°40′21″W

Geography
- Location: Brookline, New Hampshire

Potanipo Hill is a 613-foot-high (187 m) peak located in the town of Brookline in southern New Hampshire, United States.

The hill became home to one of the first lift-served ski areas in New England when Brookline Ski Area opened on its eastern face. The area later grew to become a larger regional operation known as Big Bear and later Musket Mountain. The ski area closed in 1984.

Paul Andres purchased a large tract of land on the mountain, including most of the former ski area, and began developing a large art facility. Now open to the public, Andres Institute of Art features dozens of works designed by artists from around the world.

== See also ==
- Potanipo Pond
