= Stillwater River (Nashua River tributary) =

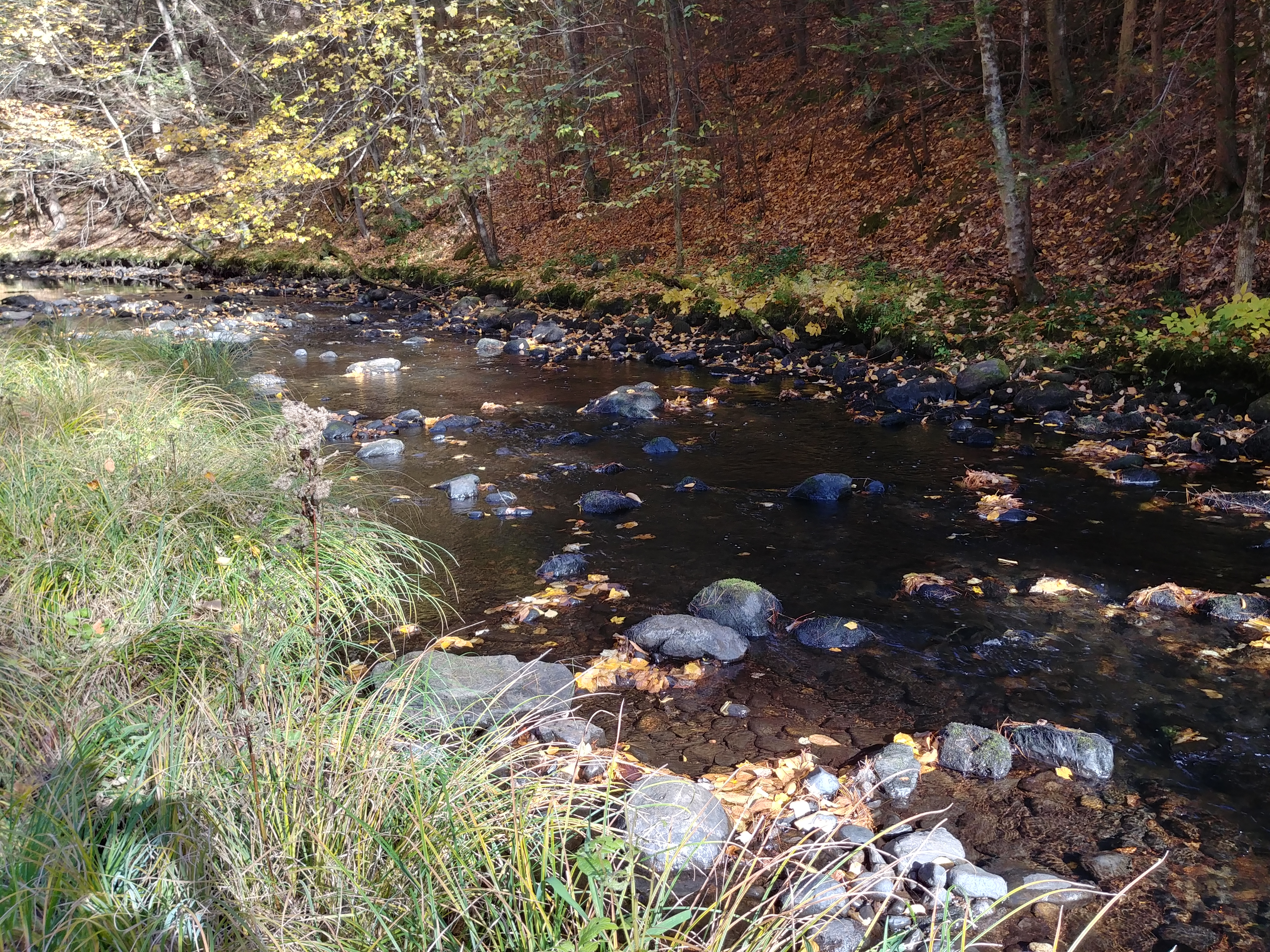
- The Stillwater flowing through Sterling, Massachusetts

Location
- Country: United States

Physical characteristics
- Source
  - location: Princeton, Massachusetts
  - coordinates: 42.4633°N 71.8258°W
  - elevation: 720 ft (220 m)
- Mouth
  - location: Wachusett Reservoir
  - coordinates: 42.4015°N 71.7874°W
  - elevation: 384 ft (117 m)
- Length: 8.1 mi (13.0 km)
- Basin size: 39.3 sq mi (102 km^{2})
- Discharge
  - average: 40 cu ft/s (1.1 m^{3}/s)

The Stillwater River is part of the Nashua River watershed. This river is part of the Massachusetts Water Resources Authority system that supplies drinking water to the greater Boston area.

The Stillwater River rises in Princeton, Massachusetts, the watershed generally known as the Upper Worcester Plateau, or the Monadnock Upland. This watershed tops at Wachusett Mountain, the highest feature in the area. Water flowing east from this high ground feeds the Nashua River Watershed, and water flowing west feeds the Ware River or the Millers River, both heading to the Connecticut River. The Stillwater flows 8.1 miles (13.0 km) through Princeton and Sterling before joining the Quinapoxet River at the Wachusett Reservoir in West Boylston to form the south branch of the Nashua River.

The Stillwater and Quinapoxet rivers are the two major tributaries to the Wachusett Reservoir, which serves as the primary source of water for 2.5 million consumers in 43 communities of central and eastern Massachusetts. The U.S. Geological Survey (USGS), in cooperation with the Massachusetts Department of Conservation and Recreation (DCR), operates stream-flow monitoring gages near the mouths of both rivers. This and other continuous monitoring serves to maintain the overall quality of water within the reservoir. The water of these tributaries to the Wachusett Reservoir has been of high quality for decades.

About 47% of the Stillwater sub-basin is permanently protected open space. The Massachusetts Water Resources Authority owns much of the land. The Town of Holden owns over 600 acres (2.4 km^{2}) as the Trout Brook Conservation Area, and the Massachusetts Audubon Society owns several hundred acres in the Wachusett Meadow Wildlife Sanctuary in addition to other properties within this sub-basin.

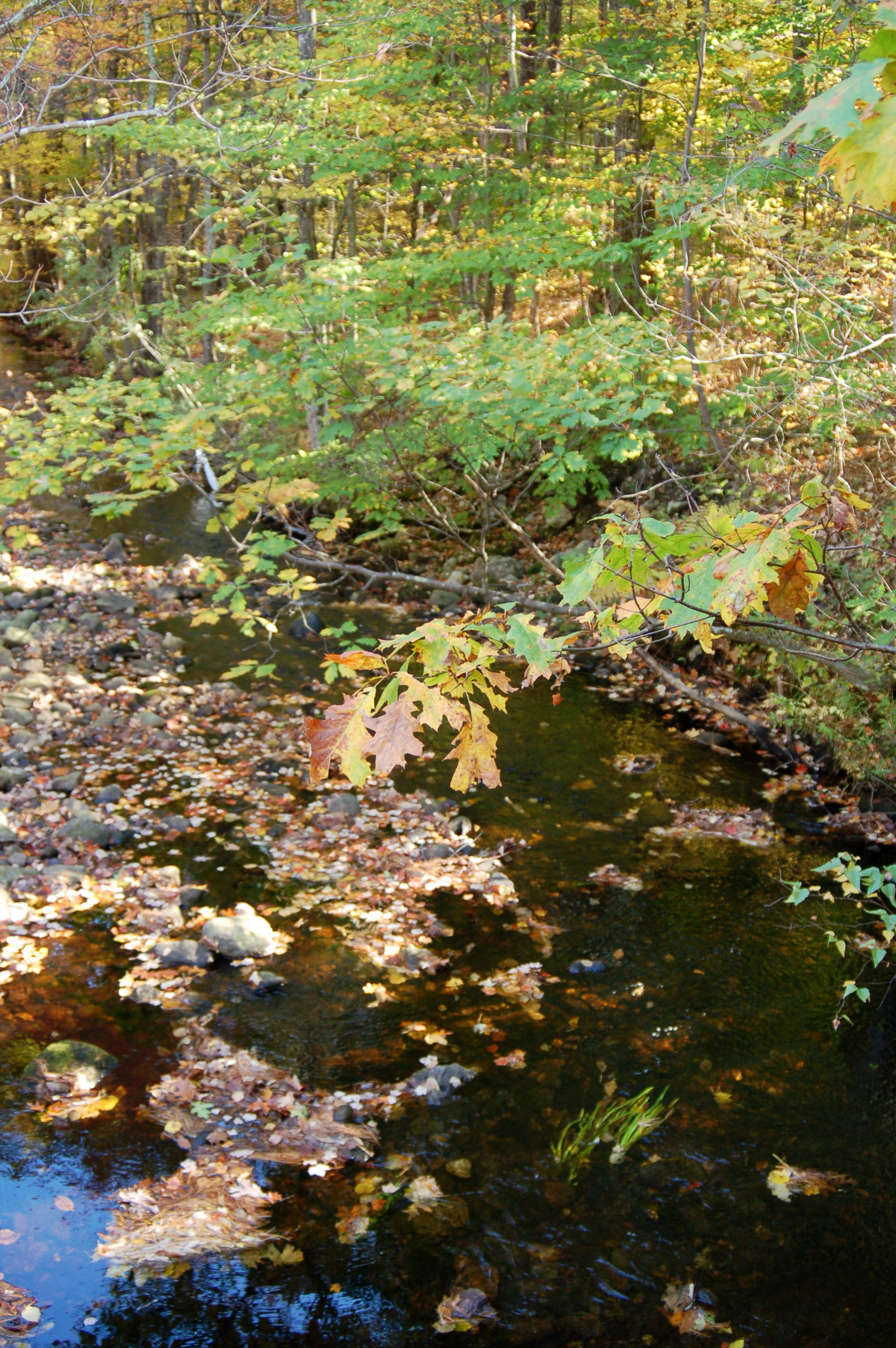
Stillwater headwaters near Princeton

== See also ==
- List of rivers of Massachusetts
