= Silver Lake (Hollis, New Hampshire) =

Lake in New Hampshire, United States

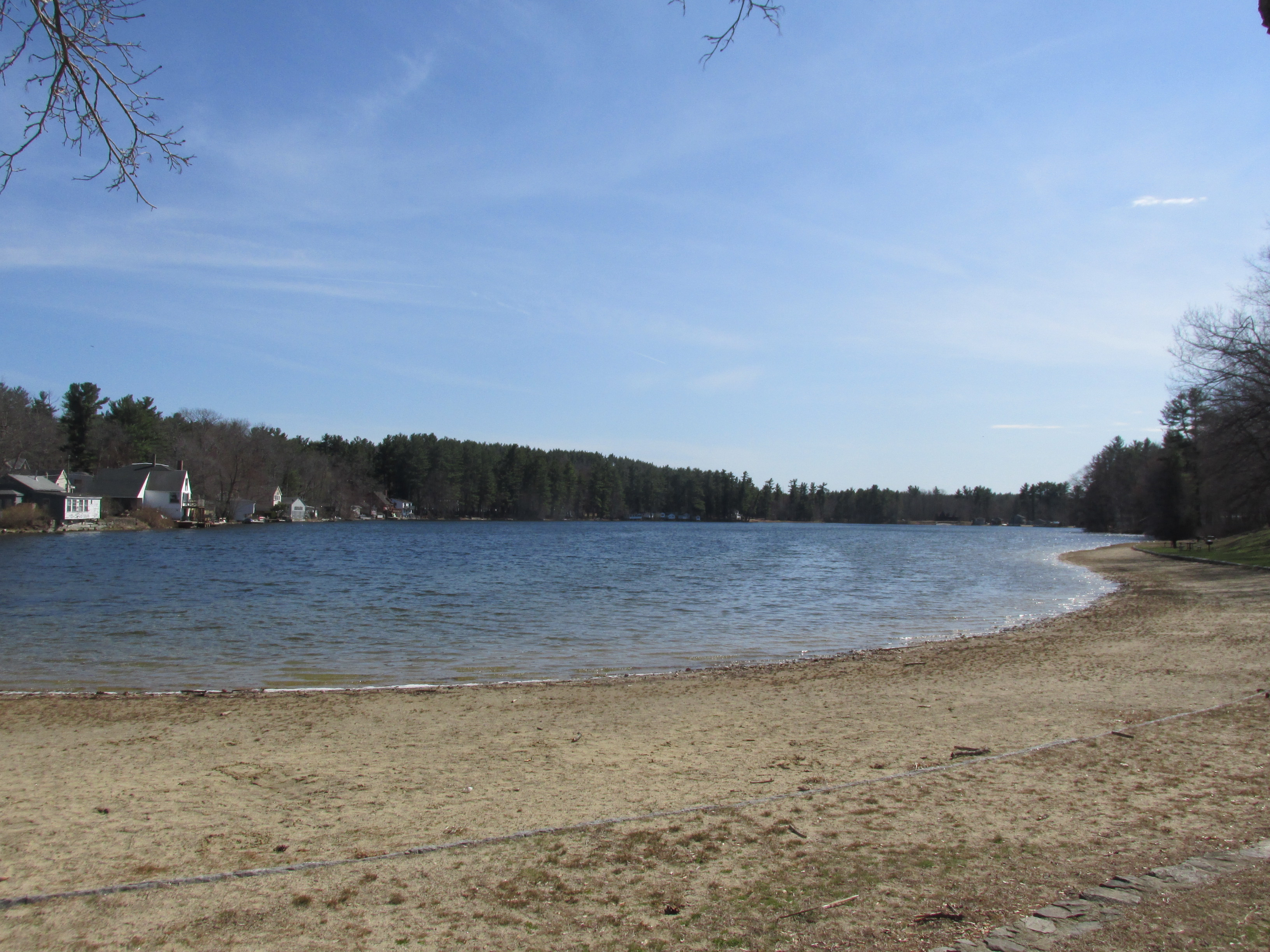
- Silver Lake

- Location within New Hampshire Location within the United States
- Location: Hollis, New Hampshire
- Coordinates: 42°45′25″N 71°35′54″W
- Primary outflows: Pennichuck Brook
- Basin countries: United States
- Max. length: 0.5 mi (0.80 km)
- Max. width: 0.2 mi (0.32 km)
- Surface area: 39 acres (16 ha)
- Average depth: 9 ft (2.7 m)
- Max. depth: 24 ft (7.3 m)
- Surface elevation: 274 ft (84 m)
- Settlements: Hollis

Silver Lake, formerly known as Long Pond, is a small lake in the town of Hollis, New Hampshire, United States. The lake was formerly surrounded by summer vacation cottages and camps, but most of these buildings have now been converted for use as year-round homes. Silver Lake State Park occupies the northern end of the lakeshore.

The lake is located on NH Route 122, north of the Hollis traffic light. The lake at its deepest is 24 feet (7.3 m) deep, and there is a deep channel running down the middle of the lake that ranges from 16 to 28 feet (4.9 to 8.5 m) at the deepest. Fish species include largemouth bass, yellow perch, sunfish, pickerel, hornpout/catfish, and a few very large common carp. The lake's depth and continual supply of cold, clean water from below can support both rainbow and brown trout.

The lake has many natural springs that provide fresh, clean water, and the small dam at the north end of the lake near the state park controls the level and output. The output flows under NH 122 and goes into Dunklee Pond which then outflows to Pennichuck Brook, a tributary of the Merrimack River.

The lake has no public boat launch, although parking at the state park can allow carry-in boats, sailboats, kayaks and other small boats. The lake has restricted hours that allow for boats to go above 10 miles per hour (16 km/h), but has no horsepower limit.

The lake has been tested for acceptable bacteria levels, and as of 2006 the State of New Hampshire had deemed the lake acceptable for swimming.

In the early 1900s when the lake was called Long Pond, it housed two dance halls, Wallace Grove and Morrills Grove. These dance halls were a very popular retreat on summer nights for many locals, some coming from as far away as Boston. Soldiers would take the train up from Fort Devens with the hope of meeting a special lady. Although both halls are long-closed, the lake remains a summer and winter retreat.

== See also ==
- List of lakes in New Hampshire
