= Brookline, New Hampshire =

- Town
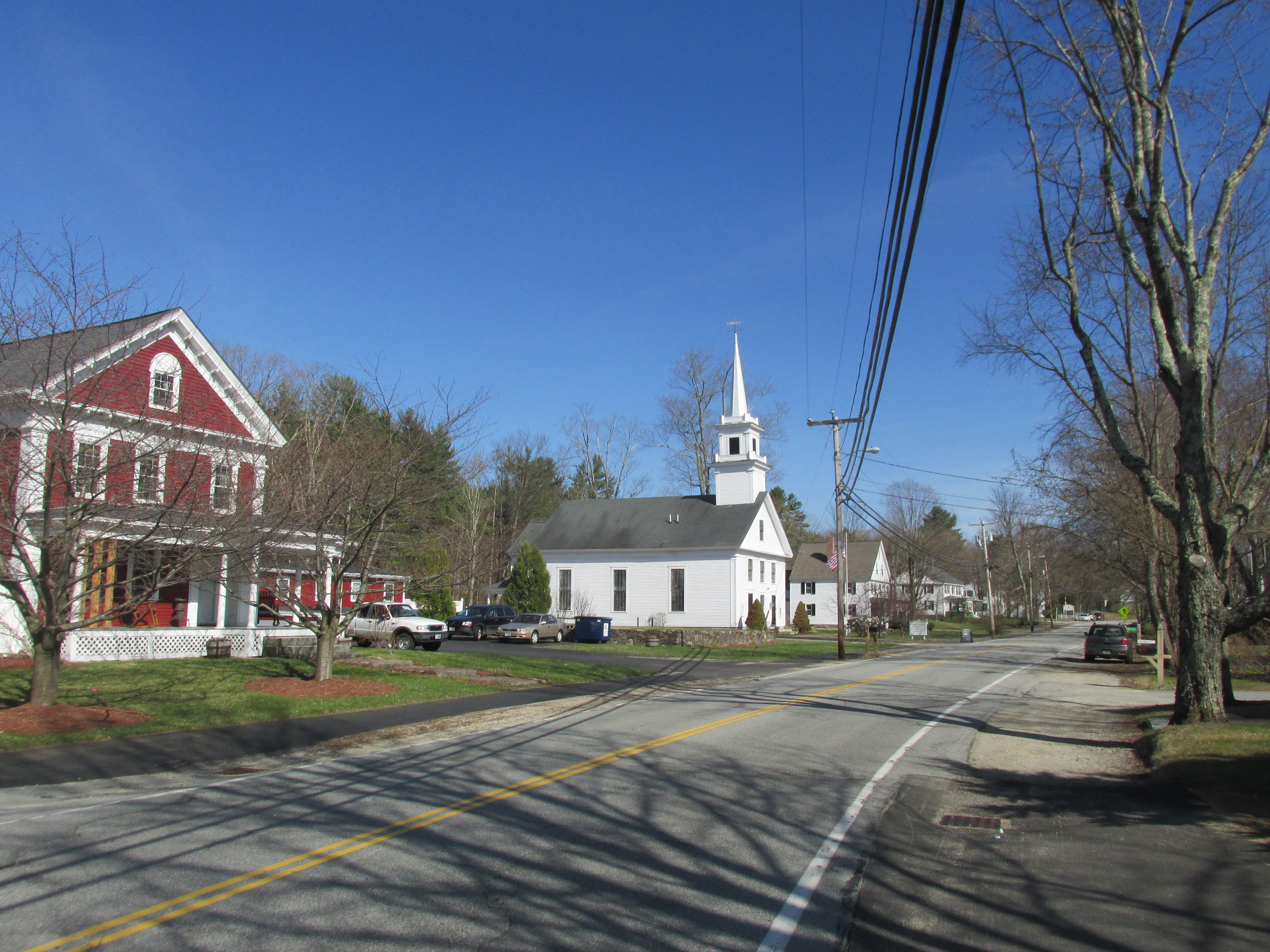
- Main Street in Brookline

- Seal

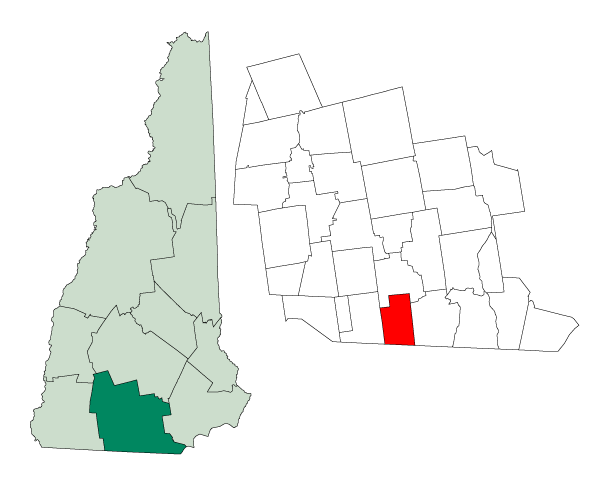
- Location in Hillsborough County, New Hampshire
- Coordinates: 42°45′21″N 71°40′16″W
- Country: United States
- State: New Hampshire
- County: Hillsborough
- Incorporated: 1769
- Villages: Brookline; North Brookline; South Brookline

Area
  - Total: 20.2 sq mi (52.3 km^{2})
  - Land: 19.8 sq mi (51.4 km^{2})
  - Water: 0.35 sq mi (0.9 km^{2}) 1.79%
- Elevation: 374 ft (114 m)

Population (2020)
  - Total: 5,639
  - Density: 284/sq mi (109.8/km^{2})
- Time zone: UTC-5 (Eastern)
  - Summer (DST): UTC-4 (Eastern)
- ZIP code: 03033
- Area code: 603
- FIPS code: 33-08100
- GNIS feature ID: 873554
- Website: brooklinenh.gov

Brookline is a town in Hillsborough County, New Hampshire, United States. The population was 5,639 at the 2020 census, up from 4,991 at the 2010 census. Brookline is home to the Talbot-Taylor Wildlife Sanctuary, Potanipo Pond, and the Brookline Covered Bridge.

== History ==
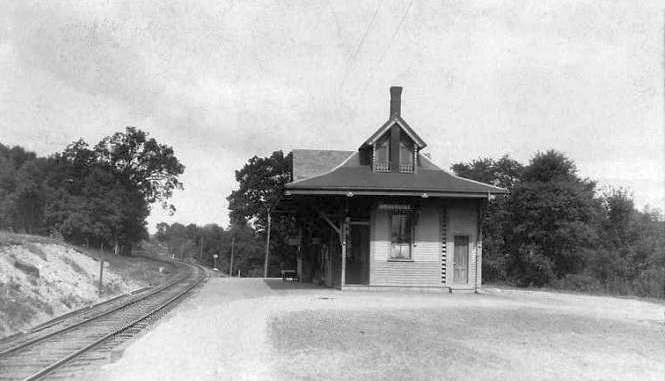
Boston & Maine Railroad station in 1907

First a part of Dunstable, Massachusetts, then settled as West Hollis, New Hampshire, the town was granted in 1769 as "Raby". Colonial Governor John Wentworth named it after his cousin, the 4th Earl of Strafford and Baron of Raby Castle.

The town was renamed in 1798 at the suggestion of a leading citizen in town originally from Brookline, Massachusetts. By 1859, when the population was 718, there were eight sawmills and one gristmill, as well as a sash and blind shop. In the earlier days of the town, Brookline was known throughout southern New Hampshire for producing lumber, charcoal and casks. The Boston and Maine Railroad eventually branched into Brookline in 1892. The train station that served Brookline during the railroad's tenure in the town has since been renovated into a private residential home. A large fraction of the area that was once railroad track is now New Hampshire Route 13.

The town received national attention in 1997, when people participating in the traditional ringing of the Congregational church bell at midnight on the Fourth of July were arrested. Several prominent members of the community were among those arrested, including Road Agent Clarence Farwell and his wife. The incident led to an investigation of the Brookline police department after questions of excessive force were raised following the arrests.

== Geography ==
According to the United States Census Bureau, the town has a total area of 20.2 square miles (52.3 km^{2}), of which 19.8 square miles (51.4 km^{2}) are land and 0.35 square miles (0.9 km^{2}) are water, comprising 1.79% of the town. The town's highest point is the western summit of Birch Hill, at 810 feet (250 m) above sea level. Potanipo Hill is a 613-foot-high (187 m) summit southwest of the town center that once was the site of a ski area from 1935 to 1984, and now is home to Andres Institute of Art.

Brookline is drained by the Nissitissit River and Spaulding Brook. The 10-mile-long (16 km) Nissitissit is known for its abundance of trout. The Nissitissit begins at the outlet of Potanipo Pond, 1/2 mile (0.8 km) west of the town center, and flows southeast to join the Nashua River in Pepperell, Massachusetts. Via the Nashua River, Brookline lies fully within the Merrimack River watershed.

The town is crossed by New Hampshire Route 13 and New Hampshire Route 130. It is about 12 miles (19 km) west of Nashua and approximately 50 miles (80 km) northwest of Boston, Massachusetts.

=== Adjacent municipalities ===
- Milford (north)
- Hollis (east)
- Pepperell, Massachusetts (southeast)
- Townsend, Massachusetts (south)
- Mason (west)

== Demographics ==
Historical population
Census	Pop.	Note	%±
1790	338		—
1800	454		34.3%
1810	538		18.5%
1820	592		10.0%
1830	627		5.9%
1840	652		4.0%
1850	718		10.1%
1860	756		5.3%
1870	741		−2.0%
1880	698		−5.8%
1890	548		−21.5%
1900	505		−7.8%
1910	501		−0.8%
1920	546		9.0%
1930	511		−6.4%
1940	561		9.8%
1950	671		19.6%
1960	795		18.5%
1970	1,167		46.8%
1980	1,766		51.3%
1990	2,410		36.5%
2000	4,181		73.5%
2010	4,991		19.4%
2020	5,639		13.0%
2024 (est.)	5,815		3.1%
U.S. Decennial Census

As of the census of 2000, there were 4,181 people, 1,343 households, and 1,146 families residing in the town. The population density was 211.5 inhabitants per square mile (81.7/km^{2}). There were 1,384 housing units at an average density of 70.0 per square mile (27.0/km^{2}). The racial makeup of the town was 97.87% White, 0.14% African American, 0.19% Native American, 0.62% Asian, 0.05% Pacific Islander, 0.22% from other races, and 0.91% from two or more races. Hispanic or Latino of any race were 0.91% of the population.

There were 1,343 households, out of which 51.9% had children under the age of 18 living with them, 76.7% were married couples living together, 5.7% had a female householder with no husband present, and 14.6% were non-families. 10.6% of all households were made up of individuals, and 3.1% had someone living alone who was 65 years of age or older. The average household size was 3.11 and the average family size was 3.36.

In the town, the population was spread out, with 33.6% under the age of 18, 4.0% from 18 to 24, 35.7% from 25 to 44, 21.6% from 45 to 64, and 5.0% who were 65 years of age or older. The median age was 36 years. For every 100 females, there were 102.8 males. For every 100 females age 18 and over, there were 98.6 males.

The median income for a household in the town was $77,075, and the median income for a family was $80,214. Males had a median income of $55,417 versus $32,750 for females. The per capita income for the town was $29,272. About 0.9% of families and 0.8% of the population were below the poverty line, including 0.9% of those under age 18 and none of those age 65 or over.

== Education ==
Brookline has a local K–6 public school system divided between two schools: Richard Maghakian Memorial School (enrolling students from kindergarten through the third grade) and Captain Samuel Douglass Academy (grades four through six). Both primarily teach STEM and the arts, at an age-appropriate degree for their respective students.

Brookline is also part of a third, cooperative school district with the neighboring town of Hollis, sharing a middle and high school.

== Economic development ==
The Brookline selectboard chartered the town's Economic Development Committee (EDC) to "promote balanced, long-term economic development, which reflects and enhances the character of the community." The EDC publishes a newsletter three or four times a year to promote local businesses.

== Community events ==
Two major community events take place in Brookline: the winter Chowder/Soup/Chili Cook-Off and the early-fall Bridal Show. Hundreds of New England residents have attended these two events.

== Town newspapers ==
Local news is provided online by:

- the Hollis Brookline News.
- the Hollis Brookline Journal.

== Churches ==
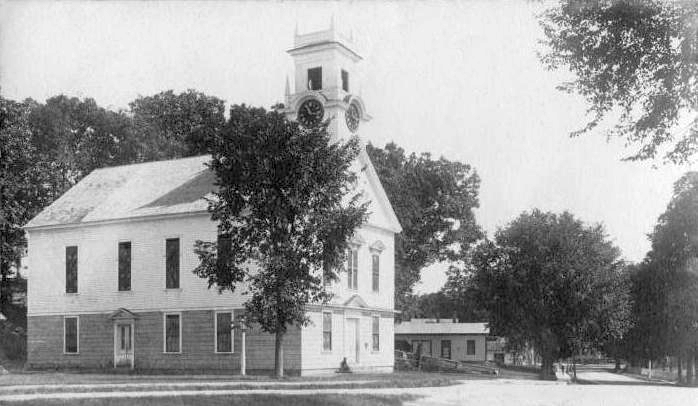
Brookline Community Church in 1906

In 1951, the Church of Christ was formed by the unification of the Congregational (established 1795) and Methodist (est. 1852) churches of Brookline; this unification was spearheaded by Betty Hall, then a local businesswoman. It was renamed the Brookline Community Church in 2005 and is affiliated with both the UCC and UMC conferences.

== Sites of interest ==
- Andres Institute of Art
- New Hampshire Historical Marker No. 271: Fresh Pond Ice Company
- Potanipo Hill
