= Marion Stoddart =

- Stoddart celebrating her 90th birthday with the Nashua River Watershed Association in 2018
- Born: May 26, 1928 (age 98)
- Occupations: Environmentalist, author

Marion Stoddart (born May 26, 1928) is an activist and community leader best known for her work leading up to the rescue and recovery of the Nashua River in Massachusetts and New Hampshire. She has received recognition from the media, politicians, and nonprofit organizations for her activism.

== Early years and education ==
Marion Stoddart was born in Reno, Nevada. In 1928 her family moved to a small town called Fernley, where her father owned a general store. The family also had an alfalfa farm. As a teenager Stoddart helped her father run his store, and she worked in a post office. After attending high school for only three years, Marion graduated, and attended Occidental College in Los Angeles where she studied anthropology and sociology. She obtained a teaching credential from the University of California at Berkeley. Stoddart met her future husband, Hugh, soon after leaving home. Hugh was a student at Caltech and later did graduate work at MIT. While at MIT Hugh invited Marion to visit him there, and they decided to marry.

== Saving the Nashua River ==
In the early 1960s there were no laws regulating the way waste from industry was disposed of on either the state or federal level in the United States. By the mid-1960s there was some preliminary legislation to regulate the pollution of waterways, but as yet no laws on the state level. In the 1960s, when Stoddart began to organize to save the Nashua River, it was one of the ten most polluted rivers in the US.

In 1962 the Stoddarts moved from Nevada to the small community of Groton Massachusetts with their three children. Their home in Groton was only three quarters of a mile from the Nashua River, which by then was already known to be highly polluted, and even dangerous. To address the problem, Stoddart enlisted the help of thousands of ordinary citizens to form a Nashua River Clean Up Committee. She also met with Massachusetts Governor John Volpe, Fitchburg Mayor William Flynn, and executives of the paper mills that were polluting the river. Through her tireless efforts Stoddart was able to get the first anti-water pollution bill enacted by any state in the US: the 1965 Massachusetts Clean Water Act.

Stoddart's work did not stop with the passage of the 1965 legislation. She also founded the Nashua River Watershed Association. This organization helped to further protect 174 miles of the river and its major tributaries.

== Recognition ==
Stoddart was profiled on the "Today Show," for her work. In 1987 the United Nations honored her with their Environment Program's Global 500 Award. In 1993 the National Geographic Society profiled her life and work. Also in 1993 her work was chronicled in a children's book "A River Ran Wild" by Lynne Cherry, which is today standard curriculum for most fourth graders in the US.

In 2010 Susan Edwards and Dorie Clark directed an award-winning, 30-minute documentary, "The Work of 1000," about the life and work of Stoddart.

Stoddart is the focus of a civic engagement program called "The Work of 1000," which is also the name of the short documentary film made about her work.

On May 2, 2012 US Representative Niki Tsongas, with Marion Stoddart standing beside her, announced legislation to designate the Nashua River as a Scenic and Wild River. That designation will continue to protect and preserve the river and allow it to receive federal monies to continue conservation efforts into the future.

In honor of her 85th birthday the Nashua River Watershed Association, the organization that Stoddart founded, held a fundraising drive to support programs and activities that will expand, promote, and permanently protect the greenways along the rivers, streams, and wetlands in the Nashua River watershed.

In July 2014 a pair of artists, Jon S. Allen and Sophy A. Tuttle began work on a mural in honor of Stoddart along the Nashua River in Fitchburg's Riverfront Park.

In 2024 the Groton-Dunstable Middle School in Groton, Massachusetts, renamed their south building the Marion Stoddart building in her honor.

== Family ==
Stoddart is married to Hugh, a physicist. They have three children and five grandchildren.
