= Hollis/Brookline High School =

Public school

Hollis Brookine High School
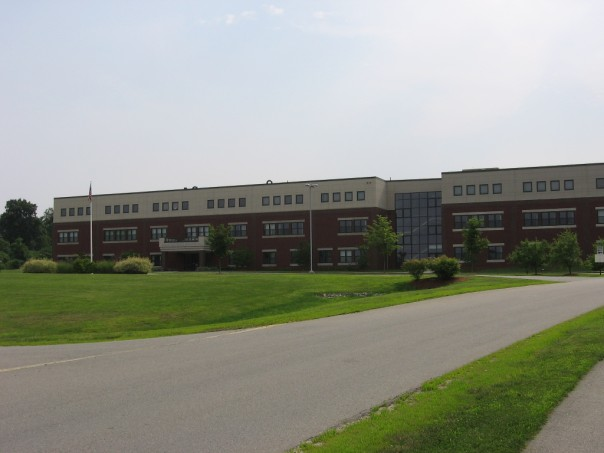

Location
- 24 Cavalier Court; Hollis, New Hampshire; USA; 42°44′01″N 71°35′40″W

Information
- Type: Public secondary
- Established: 1997
- School district: SAU 41
- Principal: Jacob Hess
- Teaching staff: 81.00 (FTE)
- Grades: 9–12
- Enrollment: 754(2025-2026)
- Student to teacher ratio: 9.3
- Campus: Rural
- Colors: Blue, black and white
- Mascot: Cavaliers
- Rivals: Souhegan, Milford
- Accreditation: New England Association of Schools and Colleges
- SAT average: 1127
- Newspaper: The CavChron
- Website: www.myhbhs.org

Hollis Brookline High School (HBHS) is a public school located in Hollis, New Hampshire, serving the towns of Hollis and Brookline. It is administered by New Hampshire School Administration Unit (SAU) 41.

Aerial view of the school

== Academics ==
Hollis Brookline High School offers accelerated and honors courses and has an Advanced Placement (AP) program including English Literature and Composition, English Language and Composition, Calculus, US History, Statistics, Physics, Computer Science, Chemistry, Biology, Environmental Science, and World History. HBHS was named a Blue Ribbon School in 2010 and has appeared on the Newsweek list of top high schools in America.

== Performing arts ==
HBHS has hosted the New Hampshire Band Directors Association (NHBDA) Jazz Clinic for ten years, besides one cancellation due to snow in 2015.

== Notable alumni ==
- Guy Ferland, film and television director
- Ludwig Ahgren, YouTube live streamer, YouTuber
- Our Last Night, the band was formed while the core members attended the high school
