= Hollis, New Hampshire =

- Town
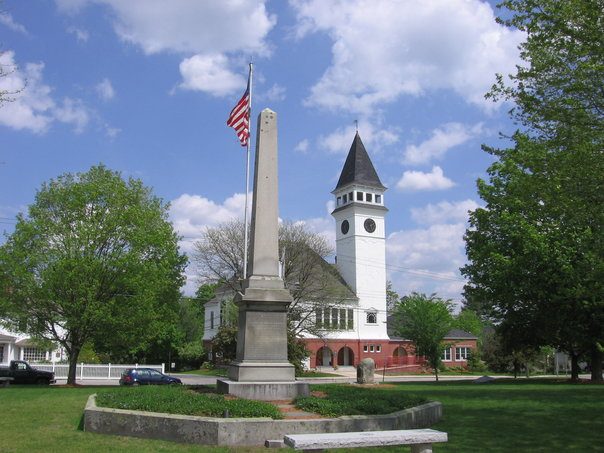
- Monument Square with Hollis Town Hall

- Seal

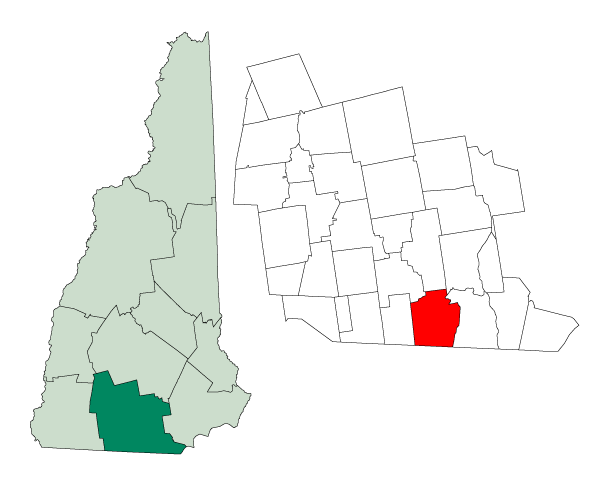
- Location in Hillsborough County, New Hampshire
- Coordinates: 42°45′15″N 71°35′42″W
- Country: United States
- State: New Hampshire
- County: Hillsborough
- Incorporated: April 3, 1746

Government
  - Select Board: David Petry, Chair; Tom Whalen; Susan Benz; Erin Hubbard; Will Walker
  - Town Administrator: Chrissy Herrera

Area
  - Total: 32.30 sq mi (83.65 km^{2})
  - Land: 31.73 sq mi (82.18 km^{2})
  - Water: 0.57 sq mi (1.47 km^{2}) 1.76%
- Elevation: 400 ft (120 m)

Population (2020)
  - Total: 8,342
  - Density: 263/sq mi (101.5/km^{2})
- Time zone: UTC-5 (Eastern)
  - Summer (DST): UTC-4 (Eastern)
- ZIP code: 03049
- Area code: 603
- FIPS code: 33-37140
- GNIS feature ID: 873628
- Website: www.hollisnh.org

Hollis is a town in Hillsborough County, New Hampshire, United States. The population was 8,342 at the 2020 census, having grown 9% from the 2010 population of 7,684. The town center village is listed on the National Register of Historic Places as Hollis Village Historic District.

== History ==
=== Town name ===
According to Samuel T. Worcester's history which was commissioned by the town selectmen in 1878, the town was incorporated in the province of New Hampshire on April 3, 1746, "to have continence forever by the name of Holles..."

Worcester argues that, at the time of the charter, Governor Benning Wentworth was indebted to Thomas Pelham-Holles, 1st Duke of Newcastle, for his appointment as governor. According to Worcester, it was "very much the custom with Gov. Wentworth" to name towns in honor of his friends and patrons. Thus in the same year, the towns of Pelham and Holles were incorporated, and named after the duke. Worcester cites a Mr. Bancroft who,

"...in his history, says of him (Newcastle) that he was of so feeble a head, and so treacherous a heart that Sir Robert Walpole called his name 'Perfidy'; that Lord Halifax used to revile him as a knave and fool, and that he was so ignorant of this continent, that it was said of him, that he addressed his letters to the 'Island of New England.'"

Thomas Hollis (1659–1731) was a major benefactor of Harvard College. According to Worcester, about the year 1775, town records started appearing with the town's name spelled as "Hollis", after Thomas Hollis. Both spellings were used until about 1815, after which only the name "Hollis" appears, "...while Holles, the name of the Duke of Newcastle, has passed into merited oblivion."

=== First settlers ===
Peter Powers settlement marker

Captain Peter Powers (1707–1757), his wife Anna Keyes (1708–1798), and their two children Peter (1729–1800) and Stephen (born 1729) were the first settlers of Hollis, in 1731. In 1732, the Powers birthed the first child in Hollis, a daughter, also named Anna. According to Spaulding's history, Powers "became a noted backwoodsman and colonial land surveyor," and eventually accrued approximately 1,500 acres (610 ha) in the north part of Hollis. Powers was also a militia officer in the French and Indian Wars and was commissioned captain by Governor Wentworth.

The younger Peter was the first college graduate from Hollis, matriculating from Harvard in 1754. He served as pastor of churches throughout New England and died at the age of 71 in Deer Island, Maine.

=== Notable events ===
- From its charter in 1746 until about 1763, Hollis was engaged in a running border dispute with Dunstable (now Nashua, New Hampshire) over a small settlement at "One Pine Hill", near Flint Pond. The General Court eventually resolved the dispute in favor of Hollis.
- In 1769, a strip one and a quarter miles wide on the western border of Hollis was incorporated into the new town of Raby. In 1785, the General Court granted a petition of Raby to annex an additional three-quarters of a mile of the western Hollis border. In 1796, the name of Raby was changed to Brookline
- In 1770, by act of the General Court, Hollis annexed a portion of the town of Monson when its charter was repealed by its own request.
- In 1773, Hollis acquired some 500 acres (200 ha) more land from Dunstable in a dispute over the building and upkeep of a bridge over the Nashua River.
- In 1794, the town of Milford was incorporated, subsuming an area of 1,000 to 1,500 acres (400 to 610 ha) from the northwest corner of Hollis, resulting in a total size, by an 1806 survey, of some 30.67 square miles (79.4 km^{2}).

=== Notable facts ===
The following is from Worcester's History of Hollis:

- When Hollis was incorporated, the town tax list comprised 54 families.
- By 1760, that number had risen to over 105 families.
- In 1767, two of the 384 slaves in New Hampshire resided in Hollis. In 1775, four of the 656 slaves in New Hampshire resided in Hollis.
- The first trial for murder in Hillsborough County was of Israel Wilkins Jr, of Hollis, for the murder of his father, Israel Wilkins Sr., on November 2, 1772. The elder Wilkins died of "a blow upon the head...of the length three inches and the depth of one inch." Wilkins Jr. was found guilty of man-slaughter, pleaded benefit of clergy, and was subsequently branded upon the thumb with the letter "T", and forced to forfeit all his goods to the King.
- Two-thirds of the grantees of the charter for the town of Plymouth, New Hampshire, were from Hollis, causing Worcester to refer to it as "A Hollis Colony".
- Eight Hollis residents were killed at the Battle of Bunker Hill.
- 125 Hollis men were in the army in whole or in part during the year 1776, approximately one tenth of the population.
  - There is a large stone and a plaque near the center of town memorializing the Nevins brothers. They were moving the boulder out of a road when they heard about the British marching on Lexington and Concord and they left the stone where it was to join the minutemen. Youngest brother Phineas Nevins was later killed at the battle of Bunker Hill.
- 22 Hollis men died while in the army during the Revolutionary War.
- In 1820, Hollis had five grain mills, six saw mills, one clothing mill, two taverns and four stores. By 1878, it had one grain mill, no saw or clothing mills, no taverns, and one store.

=== Railroad ===
Hollis was a station stop on the Worcester & Nashua Railroad, which built its line through the town in 1848 as part of a through route between Worcester, Massachusetts and Portland, Maine. The line was later acquired in 1886 by the Boston & Maine Railroad. The WN&P from Hollis to Nashua, New Hampshire, was abandoned in 1941, and the B&M subsequently renamed the remaining line south to Ayer, Massachusetts the Hollis Branch. The B&M continued to provide freight service until the Hollis Branch was abandoned in 1982, with a fuel dealer being the last rail customer in town.

== Geography ==
Hollis is in southern New Hampshire, along the southern edge of Hillsborough County. Its southern border is the Massachusetts state line. The town is bordered to the east by the city of Nashua.

According to the U.S. Census Bureau, the town has a total area of 32.3 square miles (83.6 km^{2}), of which 31.7 square miles (82.2 km^{2}) are land and 0.58 square miles (1.5 km^{2}) are water, comprising 1.76% of the town. The highest point in Hollis is the summit of Birch Hill, at 821 feet (250 m) above sea level, located near the town's western border.

The Nashua River flows through the southeastern corner of the town out of Pepperell, Massachusetts and into Nashua. The Nissitissit River, a tributary of the Nashua, flows through the western part of the town. Pennichuck Brook rises near the center of town, north of Silver Lake, and drains the northern part of the town along with its tributary, Witches Brook. Pennichuck Brook and the Nashua River are tributaries of the Merrimack River, and Hollis lies fully within the Merrimack's watershed.

=== Adjacent municipalities ===
- Amherst (north)
- Merrimack (northeast)
- Nashua (east)
- Pepperell, Massachusetts (south)
- Brookline (west)
- Milford (northwest)

=== Climate ===
Hollis is in USDA plant hardiness zone 5A. The closest NOAA climate station is in Nashua. The nearby table shows applicable temperature and precipitation data by month.

Climate data for Hollis, NH (Nashua, NH Airport)
Month	Jan	Feb	Mar	Apr	May	Jun	Jul	Aug	Sep	Oct	Nov	Dec	Year
Mean daily maximum °F	33.4	36.5	45.4	57.0	69.1	77.5	82.5	80.6	72.4	61.4	49.8	38.1	58.6
Daily mean °F	22.8	25.6	34.9	45.6	57.0	65.9	70.8	69.0	60.5	49.1	39.4	28.3	47.4
Mean daily minimum °F	12.1	14.6	24.4	34.1	44.9	54.2	59.1	57.3	48.6	36.8	28.9	18.4	36.1
Average precipitation inches	3.86	3.09	4.07	3.92	3.66	3.91	3.70	3.78	3.63	3.93	4.17	3.71	45.43
Average snowfall inches	15.7	14.4	11.0	1.9	0	0	0	0	0	0	3.3	12.4	58.7
Mean daily maximum °C	0.8	2.5	7.4	13.9	20.6	25.3	28.1	27.0	22.4	16.3	9.9	3.4	14.8
Daily mean °C	−5.1	−3.6	1.6	7.6	13.9	18.8	21.6	20.6	15.8	9.5	4.1	−2.1	8.6
Mean daily minimum °C	−11.1	−9.7	−4.2	1.2	7.2	12.3	15.1	14.1	9.2	2.7	−1.7	−7.6	2.3
Average precipitation mm	98	78	103	100	93	99	94	96	92	100	106	94	1,154
Average snowfall cm	40	37	28	4.8	0	0	0	0	0	0	8.4	31	149
Average precipitation days (≥ 0.01 in.)	9.8	8.8	10.7	10.4	11.3	11.2	10.0	9.4	9.3	9.4	10.7	10.1	121.1
Source: NOAA Climate Data for Nashua NH

== Demographics ==
Hollis population by age
1. Under 18 (29.6%)
2. 18 to 24 (3.80%)
3. 25 to 44 (28.5%)
4. 45 to 64 (29.8%)
5. 65+ (8.30%)

As with many of the towns on the New Hampshire border with Massachusetts, Hollis is rapidly changing from mixed-use farmland (apple orchards, corn, pumpkins, and other vegetables) to a bedroom community for the 54% of working residents who work elsewhere in New Hampshire, and the 30% who work out of state.

As of the census of 2000, there were 7,015 people, 2,440 households, and 2,025 families residing in the town. The population density was 221.0 inhabitants per square mile (85.3/km^{2}). There were 2,491 housing units at an average density of 78.5 per square mile (30.3/km^{2}). The racial makeup of the town was 96.59% White, 0.44% African American, 0.11% Native American, 1.65% Asian, 0.01% Pacific Islander, 0.17% from other races, and 1.01% from two or more races. Hispanic or Latino of any race were 0.93% of the population.

There were 2,440 households, out of which 42.0% had children under the age of 18 living with them, 74.9% were married couples living together, 5.8% had a female householder with no husband present, and 17.0% were non-families. 13.4% of all households were made up of individuals, and 4.8% had someone living alone who was 65 years of age or older. The average household size was 2.88 and the average family size was 3.16.

In the town, the population was spread out, with 29.6% under the age of 18, 3.8% from 18 to 24, 28.5% from 25 to 44, 29.8% from 45 to 64, and 8.3% who were 65 years of age or older. The median age was 40 years. For every 100 females, there were 99.0 males. For every 100 women age 18 and over, there were 98.0 men.

For the period 2014–2018, the median income for a household in the town was $132,500, and the median income for a family was $148,820. Men had a median income of $112,692 versus $73,971 for women. The per capita income for the town was $62,329. About 1.2% of the population were below the poverty line.

=== Historical population change ===
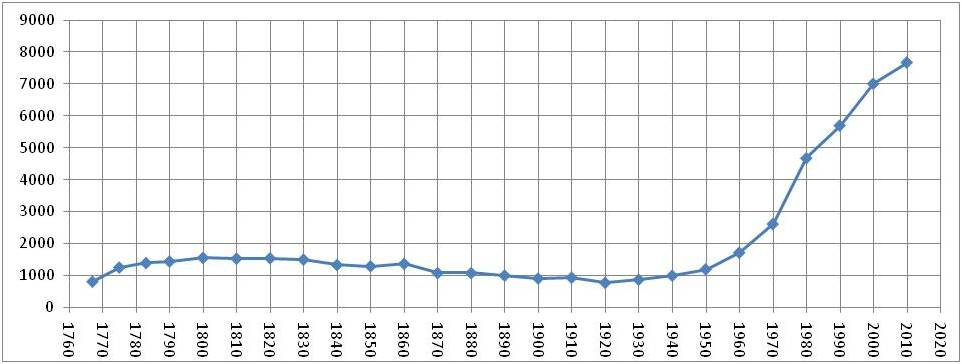
Historical Population of Hollis, NH

Historical population
Census	Pop.	Note	%±
1790	1,441		—
1800	1,557		8.0%
1810	1,529		−1.8%
1820	1,543		0.9%
1830	1,501		−2.7%
1840	1,333		−11.2%
1850	1,293		−3.0%
1860	1,370		6.0%
1870	1,079		−21.2%
1880	1,077		−0.2%
1890	1,000		−7.1%
1900	910		−9.0%
1910	935		2.7%
1920	775		−17.1%
1930	870		12.3%
1940	996		14.5%
1950	1,196		20.1%
1960	1,720		43.8%
1970	2,616		52.1%
1980	4,679		78.9%
1990	5,705		21.9%
2000	7,017		23.0%
2010	7,684		9.5%
2020	8,342		8.6%
2024 (est.)	8,746		4.8%
U.S. Decennial Census

The table and chart, taken primarily from historical data from the U.S. Census Bureau, shows the population of Hollis from 1767 through 2010.

After nearly doubling in population over the last 33 years of the 18th century, Hollis' population consistently declined (excepting only the decade of the 1850s and the first decade of the 20th century) for 120 years, not returning to the levels of 1800 until sometime during the 1950s. Since 1930, Hollis' population has consistently grown, particularly during the 1950s, 1960s, and 1970s.

== Culture ==
Hollis has a number of town traditions and celebrations characteristic of old New England towns, including two harvest festivals and the annual celebration "Old Home Days."

=== Old Home Days ===
Hollis Old Home Days is "an annual weekend celebration of the days of 'Hollis Past'." Old Home Days were originally established in New Hampshire in 1899, by then Governor Frank West Rollins, in an attempt to draw people back to New Hampshire towns. Hollis Old Home Days was reestablished in 1996 in commemoration of the town's 250th anniversary. The 2010 event included "amusement rides, parade, barbecue, silent auction, booths, fireworks, live music, balloon rides, pet parade, heritage craft demonstrations" and various other activities. It is generally held over the second weekend in September at Nichols Field in downtown Hollis.

=== Hollis Strawberry Festival ===
The annual Strawberry Festival each June comprises a concert by the town band accompanied by a variety of strawberry-based treats for sale including strawberry shortcake, pie and ice cream made from locally grown strawberries.

=== Hollis Apple Festival ===
The Hollis Apple Festival is held each year in October and includes a concert by the Hollis Town Band. The festival previously included the Applefest Half Marathon, which was first run in 1983. In 2008, it was named "Race of the Year" by New England Runner. The Applefest was co-hosted by the Hollis Women's Club.

== Government ==
As of 2010, Hollis was part of the following state and federal legislative and executive districts:

Body	District	Extent
New Hampshire House of Representatives	Hillsborough 27 and 40	District 40 includes Milford, Mont Vernon, and New Boston
New Hampshire Senate	12	Including Rindge, New Ipswich, Greenville, Mason, Brookline, Hollis, and part of Nashua
Executive Council of New Hampshire	5	Southwestern New Hampshire from Swanzey to Hudson and north to Hillsborough
U.S. Congress	2	Western New Hampshire including Nashua, Concord, Plymouth and Keene and north to the Canada–US border

== Transportation ==
There are four New Hampshire State Routes within Hollis.

- NH 111 cross the extreme southeastern corner of the town, connecting to Pepperell, Massachusetts, in the south and Nashua in the east. It is known locally as Runnells Bridge Road.
- NH 111A starts at NH 111 and goes east into Nashua. It is known locally as Groton Road.
- NH 122 is the main north–south route, running through the town center and connecting to Pepperell, Massachusetts, in the south and Amherst in the north. It is known locally as Pepperell Road, Main Street, and Silver Lake Road.
- NH 130 is the main east–west route, running through the town center and connecting to Brookline in the west and Nashua in the east. It is known locally as Proctor Hill Road, Ash Street, and Broad Street.

== Education ==
There are four schools in Hollis, two of which are part of the Hollis/Brookline Cooperative School District. Hollis Primary School serves kindergarten through third grade, and Hollis Upper Elementary School serves grades four through six. Hollis/Brookline Middle School serves seventh and eighth grade and Hollis/Brookline High School serves grades nine through twelve. Seventh grade is the first year that Hollis and Brookline students attend the same school. From then on, the student body is a combination of students from both neighboring towns. In past years, the graduating class was made up of about 100 students from each town, resulting in 200 students total. For many years, the current primary school was known as Hollis Elementary School and served kindergarten through grade six.

The current middle school (known as Hollis/Brookline Junior High School until 2001) was formerly Hollis/Brookline High School but became too small for the number of students attending. A new building was built and became the Hollis/Brookline Junior High School. However, the three buildings were still insufficient, and a new high school was opened in 1998. The former high school became the current middle school, the former middle school became Hollis Upper Elementary School, and the former Hollis Elementary became Hollis Primary.

The historic Farley Building (formerly known as simply the "White Building") is the original Hollis High School built in 1877 and continued to be used as a school building through the 2005–2006 school year. During this last year for the Farley Building, it contained classrooms for English, social studies, art, French, and Spanish. The Town of Hollis acquired the Farley Building from the Hollis School District in August 2007.

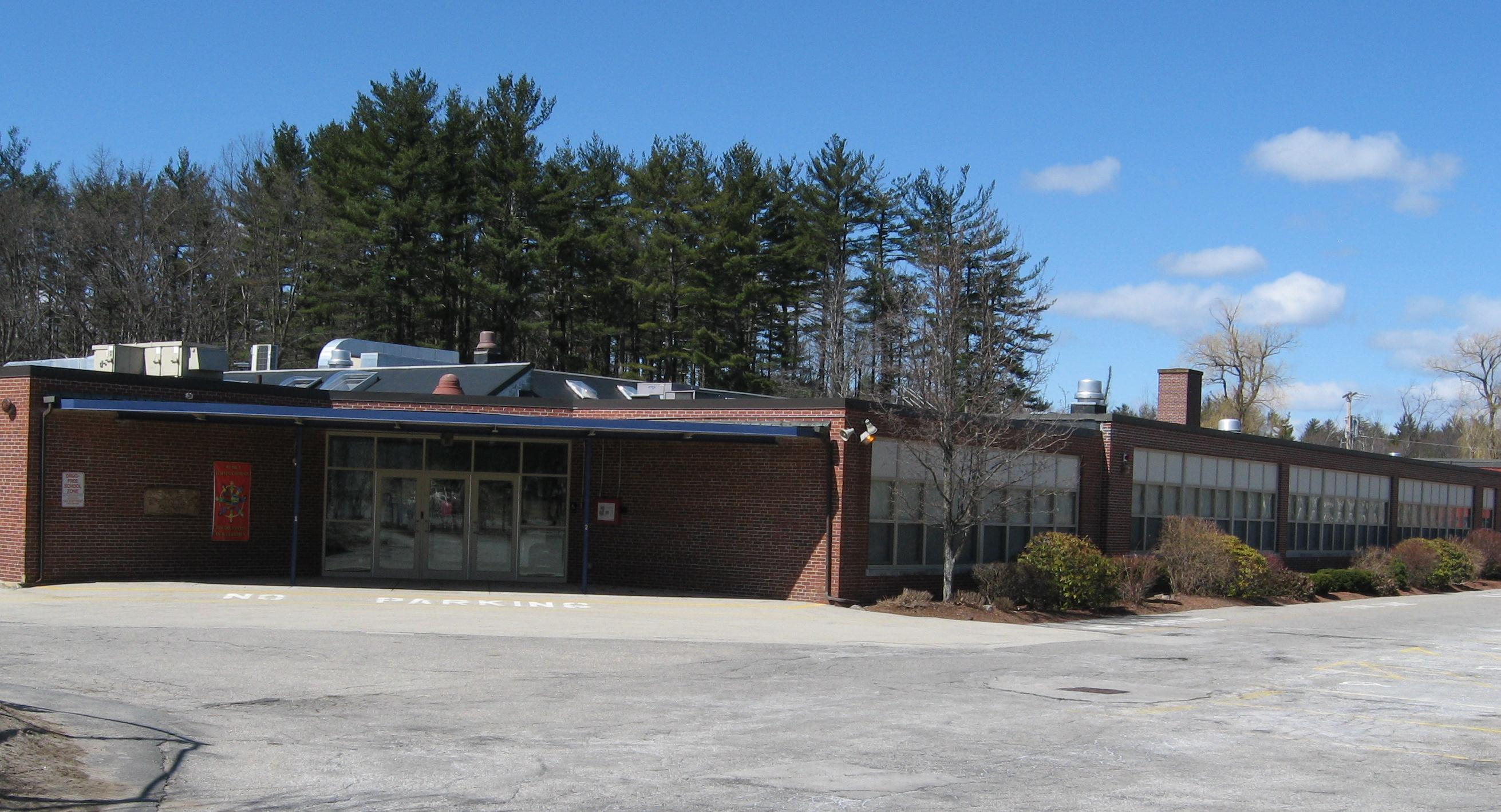
Hollis Primary School (K–3)

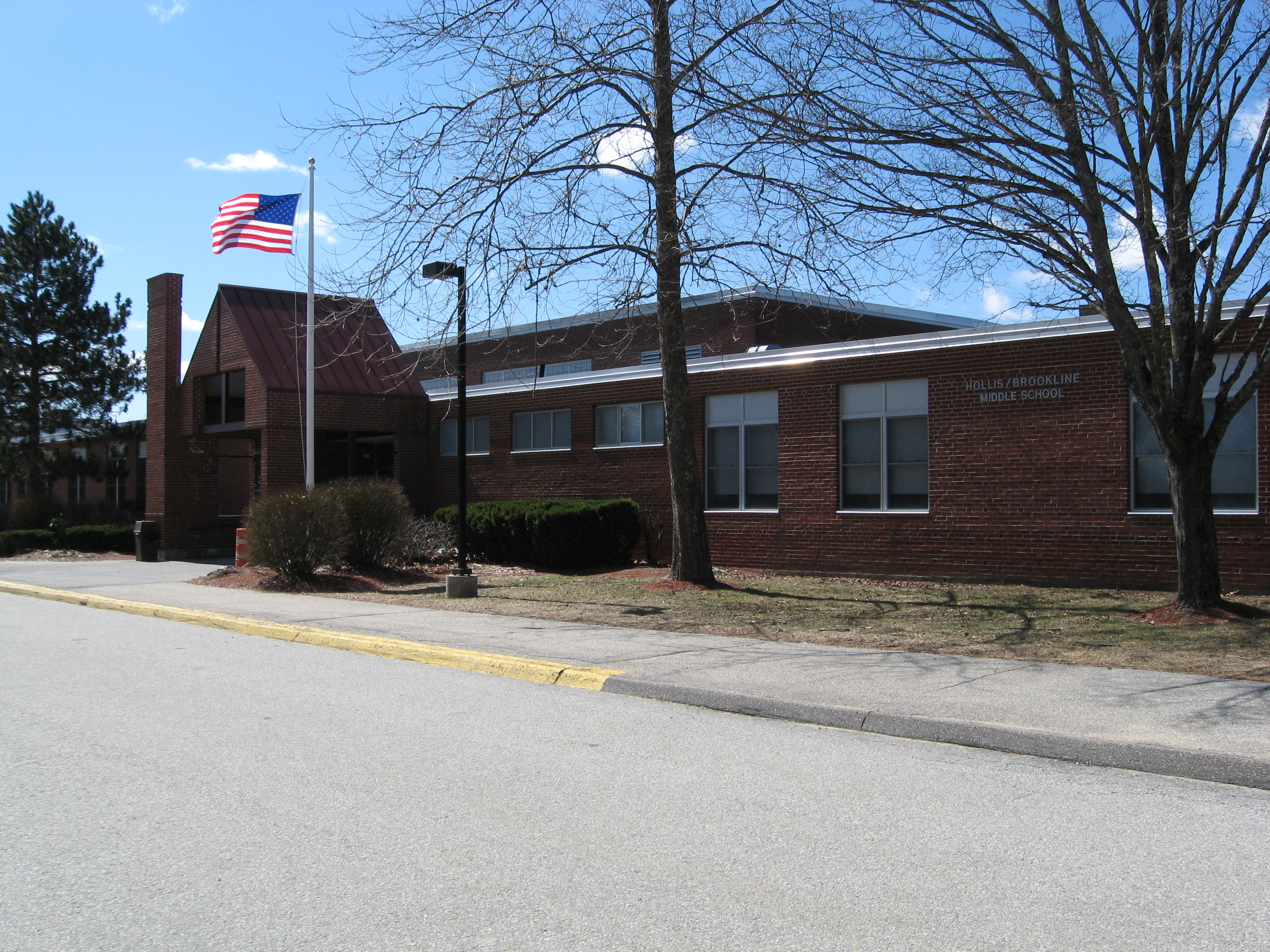
Hollis/Brookline Middle School (7–8)

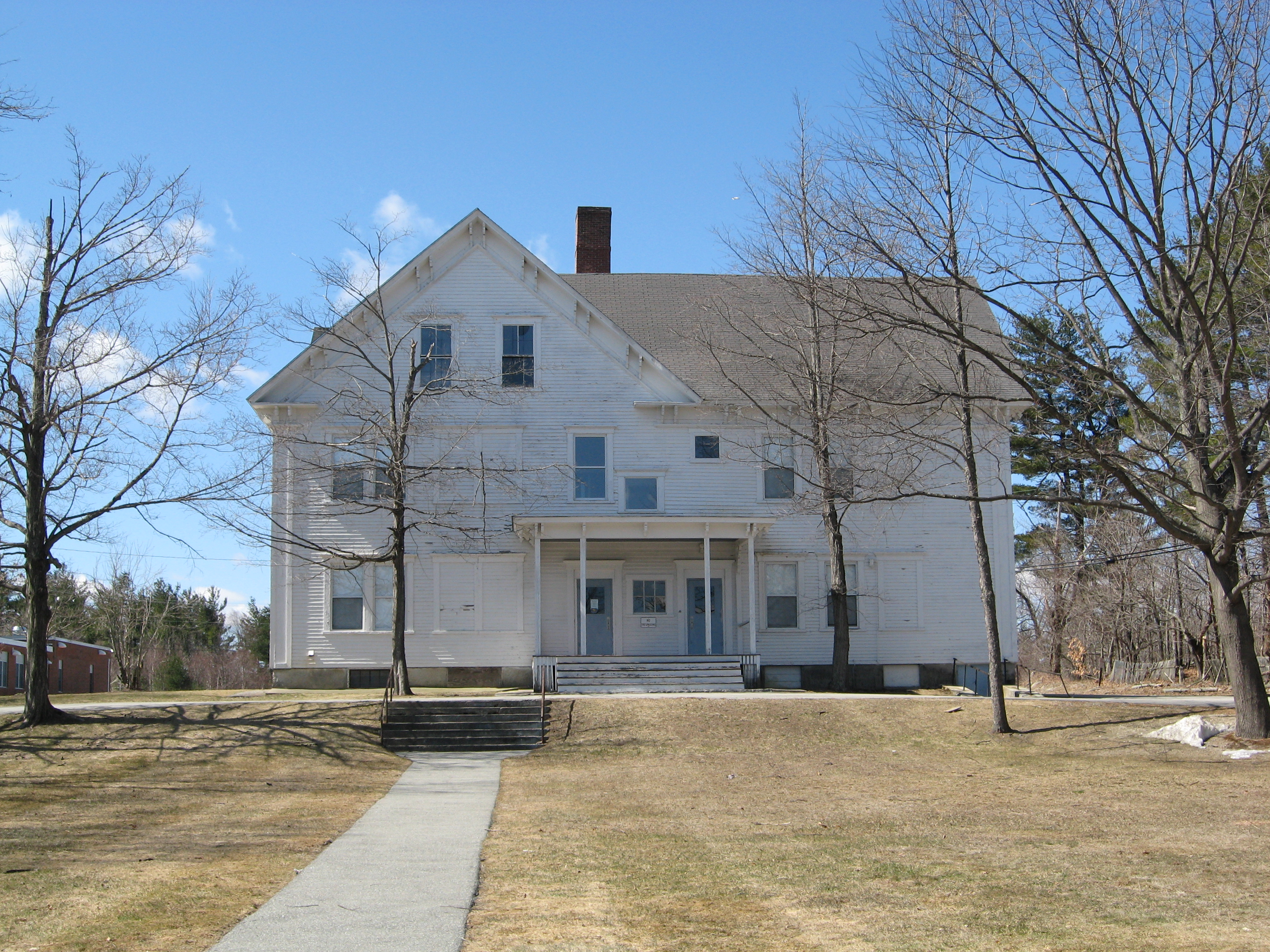
The Farley Building (Historic)

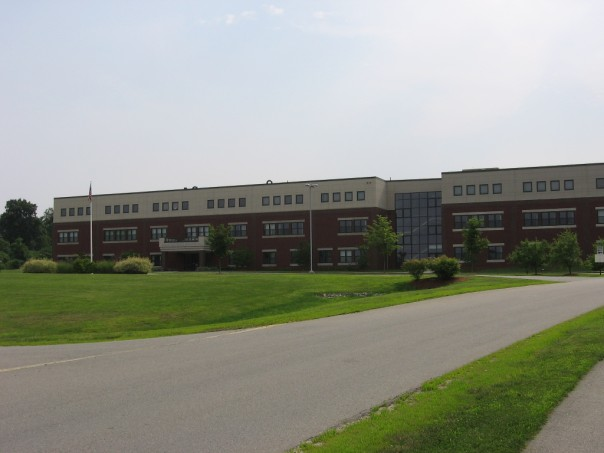
Hollis/Brookline High School (9–12)

== Notable people ==
- Ludwig Ahgren (born 1995), online streamer
- Mary A. Blood (1851–1927), co-founder and first president of Columbia School of Oratory in Chicago
- Russell Findlay (born 1965), first Chief Marketing Officer of Major League Soccer, grew up in Hollis
- Frank Merrill (1903–1955), remembered for his command of Merrill's Marauders, officially the 5307th Composite Unit (provisional), in the Burma Campaign of World War II
- Pete Palmer (born 1938), sports statistician and encyclopedia editor
- Endicott Peabody (1920–1997), former Massachusetts governor
- Warren Rudman (1930–2012), former US senator from New Hampshire
- Henry Aiken Worcester (1802–1841), Yale University alumni, and proponent of vegetarianism

== Town newspapers ==
Local news is provided by:

- Hollis Brookline News (online news site and free weekly email newsletter).
- Positively Hollis (online blog and free quarterly mailing to town residents).
