= Nashua River =

River in Massachusetts and New Hampshire, United States

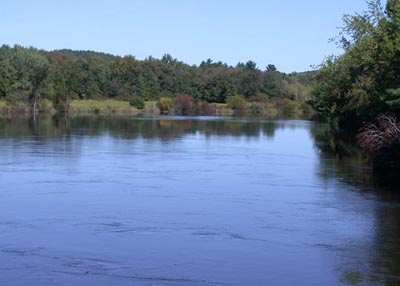
- Nashua River, just outside Groton, Massachusetts

- Location within Massachusetts Location within New Hampshire Location within the United States

Location
- Country: United States
- States: Massachusetts, New Hampshire
- Counties: Middlesex, MA; Hillsborough, NH
- Towns and cities: Lancaster, Shirley, Ayer, Groton, Pepperell (MA), Hollis, Nashua (NH)

Physical characteristics
- Source: Confluence of North Nashua River and South Nashua River
  - location: Lancaster, MA
  - coordinates: 42°26′50″N 71°40′9″W
  - elevation: 233 feet (71 m)
- Mouth: Merrimack River
  - location: Nashua, NH
  - coordinates: 42°45′58″N 71°26′49″W
  - elevation: 95 feet (29 m)
- Length: 37.5 mi (60.4 km)
- Basin size: 108 square miles (280 km^{2})
- Discharge
  - average: 150 cu ft/s (4.2 m^{3}/s)

Basin features
- Tributaries
  - left: Squannacook River, Nissitissit River
  - right: Still River

National Wild and Scenic River
- Type: Scenic
- Designated: March 12, 2019

The Nashua River, 37.5 miles (60.4 km) long, is a tributary of the Merrimack River in Massachusetts and New Hampshire in the United States. It is formed in eastern Worcester County, Massachusetts, at the confluence of the North Nashua River and South Nashua River, and flows generally north-northeast past Groton to join the Merrimack at Nashua, New Hampshire. The Nashua River watershed occupies a major portion of north-central Massachusetts and a much smaller portion of southern New Hampshire.

The North Nashua River rises west of Fitchburg and Westminster. It flows about 30 miles (48 km) generally southeast past Fitchburg, and joins the South Nashua River, shown on USGS topographic maps as the main stem of the Nashua River, about 5 miles (8 km) below its issuance from the Wachusett Reservoir.

== History ==
The river's name derives from an Algonkian word meaning "beautiful river with a pebbly bottom."

The Nashua River was heavily used for industry during the colonial period and the early years of the United States. During the late 18th century and early 19th century, the heavy concentration of paper mills and the use of dyes near Fitchburg resulted in pollution that notoriously turned the river various colors downstream from the factories.

In the mid-1960s, Marion Stoddart started a campaign to restore the Nashua River and its tributaries. She built coalitions with labor leaders and business leaders, in particular the paper companies who were the worst polluters of the river. With federal help, eight treatment plants were built or upgraded along the river. A broad conservation buffer was created along about half the river and its two main tributaries. By the early-1990s, most of the industry was still located along the river, but many parts of the river were once again safe for swimming. Her work is the subject of a 30-minute documentary movie titled Marion Stoddart: Work of 1000.

Recovery has sparked recreational use of the river at places like Mine Falls Park in Nashua.

The largely volunteer Nashua River Watershed Association, based in Groton, Massachusetts, oversees the condition of the river.

In 2013, Public Law 116–9 designated 27 mi (43 km) of the Nashua River as a National Wild and Scenic River. The legislation was sponsored by Rep. Niki Tsongas (D, MA-3), supported by the Nashua River Watershed Association and The Wilderness Society.

== Watershed ==
From its impoundment at the Wachusett Reservoir in Clinton, Massachusetts, the South Nashua River flows north and joins the North Nashua River in Lancaster. The North Nashua River flows southeast from Fitchburg and Leominster to Lancaster. The Nashua River flows northward from Lancaster, meandering its way through the north-central Massachusetts towns of Harvard, Groton, Dunstable, and Pepperell, before eventually emptying into the Merrimack River at Nashua, New Hampshire. The Nashua River watershed has a total drainage area of approximately 538 square miles (1,390 km^{2}), with 454 square miles (1,180 km^{2}) of the watershed occurring in Massachusetts and 74 square miles (190 km^{2}) in New Hampshire. The Nashua River flows for approximately 56 miles (90 km), with approximately 46 of those miles (74 km) flowing through Massachusetts. The Squannacook, Nissitissit, Stillwater, Quinapoxet, North Nashua, and South Nashua rivers feed it. The watershed encompasses all or part of 31 communities, 7 in southern New Hampshire and 24 in central Massachusetts. The watershed's largest water body is the Wachusett Reservoir, which provides drinking water to two-thirds of the Commonwealth's population.

=== Major watershed components ===
- Wachusett Reservoir is the largest water body.
  - The Stillwater River feeds Wachusett Reservoir from the northwest.
  - The Quinapoxet River feeds Wachusett Reservoir from the west.
- Wachusett Reservoir Dam impounds the South Nashua River.
- The North Nashua River joins the South Nashua River at Lancaster from the northwest.
- The Squannacook River joins the Nashua River from the northwest at the junction of the town boundaries of Shirley, Groton, and Ayer.
- The Nissitissit River joins the Nashua River from the northwest at Pepperell.

=== Major tributaries ===
Nashua River Basin
River system	Drainage area	Communities
Stillwater River	39.3 square miles (102 km^{2})	Princeton, Leominster, Sterling, and West Boylston, Massachusetts
Quinapoxet River	57 square miles (150 km^{2})	Princeton, Rutland, Paxton, Holden, and West Boylston, Massachusetts
North Nashua River		Gardner, Ashburnham, Westminster, Ashby, Fitchburg, Lunenburg, Leominster, Sterling, and Lancaster, Massachusetts
Squannacook River	73 square miles (190 km^{2})	Greenville, New Ipswich, and Mason, New Hampshire, plus West Groton, Shirley, Townsend, and Ashby, Massachusetts
Nissitissit River	23 square miles (60 km^{2})	Wilton, Mason, Milford, Brookline and Hollis, New Hampshire, plus Pepperell, Massachusetts

== See also ==
- List of rivers of Massachusetts
- List of rivers of New Hampshire
- Nashua River Rail Trail
- Nashaway people
