= John Ainsworth Dunn =

John Ainsworth Dunn (November 2, 1831, in Westminster, Massachusetts – 1915) was an American furniture maker.

He was the ninth child of John and Abigail (Jackson) Dunn. In 1837, his family moved to Petersham, Massachusetts. He began what was to become his lifelong career in chair manufacturing in 1852. He worked in a factory in East Gardner, Massachusetts. He learned the craft of chair making in three months.

"The business of chair-making was commenced on the location where the large and busy factory of John A. Dunn stood. In 1838 Elijah Putman brought the water privilege of Wm. S. Lynde, and constructed a dam, moved his shop there, supplying it with machinery, putting himself and men to work. Seven years later Mr. Putman sold out to Thorley Collester, Ruel G. Cowee and Benjamin H. Rugg, who continued the business under the firm-name of Cowee, Collester and Company for a short time. When Maro Collester and Edward Stevens retired and Franklin and George Eaton took their places, the firm was changed to Collester, Rugg and Eaton. When Mr. Collester died in 1862, Mr. Rugg and George Eaton left, and Nathaniel Holmes joined with Franklin Eaton forming Eaton and Holmes Co. In 1864 John A. Dunn was admitted to the firm, which then was called Eaton, Holmes and Company. Mr. Dunn was the "Company" part in the name. In 1875 Mr. Holmes sold his interest to Isaac J. Dunn, brother of John A. Dunn, and the firm became J.A & I.J. Dunn, under which business was carried on until 1886, when John A. Dunn brought his brother's share and conducted the enterprise on his own behalf." Heywood, William S. Gardner and Westminster Historical Sketches, pages 837–838.

A. Dunn was the sole owner of the business until 1902. On March 26, 1902, the Dunn chair factory was destroyed by a fire. Mr. Dunn had a larger and fireproof brick factory built, with all modern factory features. This was all done within a year; people who had worked at the factory before the fire were given their jobs back. The business was incorporated to the John A. Dunn Company, John A. Dunn, president, his son George A. Dunn, vice-president and another son Frank C. Dunn was secretary-treasurer. The manufacturing of the chairs was done at the plant in Gardner, Massachusetts, but offices and warehouses were established in Chicago, Boston, and St. Paul; in addition to business going through those channels, the John A. Dunn Company supplied other chair manufacturers in large quantities both at home and abroad. Dunn lived to see his plant doing a business of $1,000,000 annually. His chairs were noted for their sturdy construction and durability. While most of his furniture was utilitarian in design he was especially proud of his Arts and Crafts style furniture.

Dunn was very involved in the civic life of Gardner, Mass. In his will Dunn gave a valuable piece of property to the city of Gardner. This land was turned into a public park and the pond was named Dunn's Pond, which later became Dunn State Park. Dunn was seen by the people of Gardner as a man of strong and marked personality who made the community conspicuous in the industrial and commercial world. He was a far sighted man with a clear head for business.
