= Gardner Heritage State Park =

State park in Massachusetts, United States

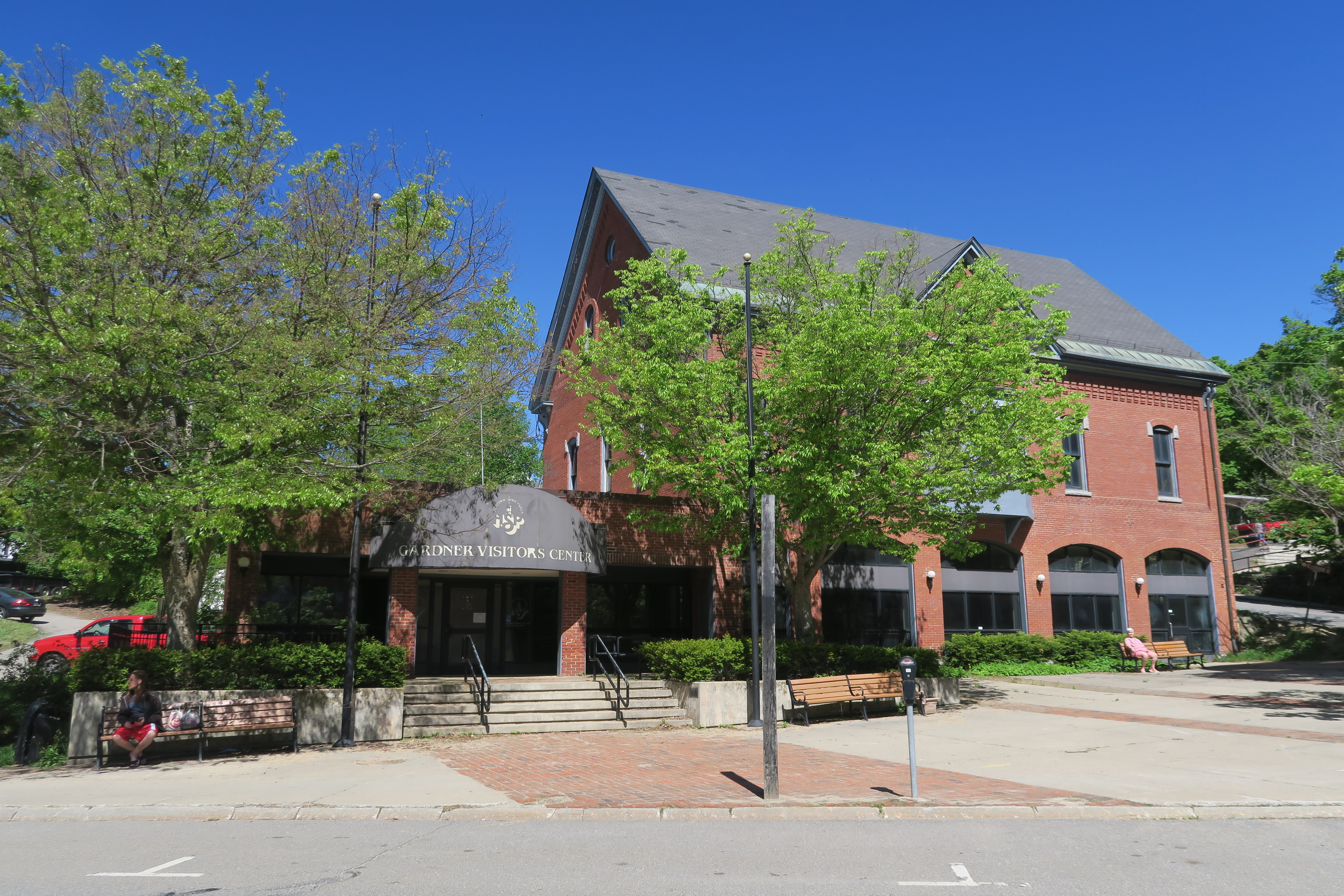

- Location within Massachusetts
- Location: Gardner, Worcester, Massachusetts, United States
- Coordinates: 42°34′38″N 71°59′39″W
- Area: 0 acres (0 ha)
- Established: 1985
- Operator: Massachusetts Department of Conservation and Recreation

Gardner Heritage State Park was a history-focused state park located in the city of Gardner, Massachusetts. The facility, which occupied a former firehouse, offered exhibits on Gardner's industrial past as a center of furniture manufacturing. Opened in winter 1985, it was closed in 2002. Following its permanent closure, the Gardner Museum took possession of the center's artifacts and historic holdings.
