= Diana Dutra =

Canadian boxer (born 1964)

Personal information
- Nicknames: Tigress, Tiger
- Nationality: Canadian
- Born: Diana Mary Dutra; 23 September 1964 (age 61) Mission, British Columbia, Canada
- Height: 5 ft 6.5 in (168.9 cm)
- Weight: Light Welterweight

Boxing career
- Reach: 69 in (180 cm)

Boxing record
- Total fights: 11
- Wins: 5
- Win by KO: 0
- Losses: 5
- Draws: 1
- No contests: 0

Diana Mary Dutra (born September 23, 1964), better known plainly as Diana Dutra, is a Canadian former female boxer. Dutra is a former world Jr. Welterweight champion.

Dutra became a professional boxer at the relatively old age of 31, an age in which many other boxers are either retired or thinking about retirement.

In a somewhat unlikely circumstance, Dutra became the IWBF's world Jr. Welterweight champion in her very first fight, held on October 20, 1995, in Denmark. Dutra beat defending world champion Helga Risoy that night by a decision in ten rounds to win the world title. Dutra never defended her title, but she kept fighting as a Jr. Welterweight until her retirement.

Her second fight was her first, and, as it turned out, only professional fight in Canada. She defeated Karen Wilson on December 12, 1996, by a four-round decision in Vancouver.

On September 19, 1997, Dutra suffered her first professional boxing defeat, when she lost to Sarah Schmedling in the first of their two encounters, by a decision in four rounds, at Tacoma, Washington.

Up until that point, Dutra had an average of only one fight per year, and, being 33 already, that type of schedule did not help her. So, in 1998, she decided to try to make up for the inactivity that she suffered during her three previous years as a boxer, by fighting five times. On February 11, she beat Luraina Undershute by a four round decision in Yakima, Washington. On March 27, she drew (tied) after four rounds with Olivia Pereira at the Tacoma Dome. On June 18, she made her Nevada debut, beating Susan Howard in Yerington by a four round decision. On July 22, she had her first fight in Las Vegas, and one of her most important fights up to that point: she lost by a six round unanimous decision to Hannah Fox that night. Finally, on November 12, she was able to avenge her earlier defeat to Schmedling, beating her by a four round unanimous decision in the women's boxing hotbed of Worley, Idaho.

Thinking that perhaps she could avenge a career loss for the second time in a row, she met Fox in a rematch next. On March 19, 1999, Fox outpointed Dutra again, also by a six round decision.

On September 28 of that year, she met Lucia Rijker, who was being actively promoted as a possible challenger of Christy Martin (Martin and Rijker have never fought in a sanctioned bout). Dutra suffered her first knockout defeat, when Rijker beat her in three rounds at Las Vegas.

Another unusual situation developed when she was given a chance to recover her old world Jr. Welterweight title by the WIBF, despite the fact she had lost her last two bouts in a row. On October 14, 2000, she boxed Agnieszka Rylik in Warsaw, Poland for the WIBF's vacant world Jr. Welterweight title, losing by a knockout in round four.

Having lost three fights in a row, two of them by knockout, Dutra decided to retire then. She has not boxed ever since.

Dutra's career record was of 5 wins and 5 losses, with 1 draw, and no knockout wins.

== Championships and accomplishments ==
- 1995 WIBF Light Welterweight Title

== See also ==
- List of female boxers
