= Dawn George =

American boxer

Personal information
- Nationality: (United States) American
- Born: Dawn Denise George; April 30, 1959 (age 67) Gardner, Massachusetts, United States
- Height: 5 ft 7 in (170 cm)
- Weight: Super featherweight

Boxing career
- Stance: Orthodox

Boxing record
- Wins: 4
- Win by KO: 3
- Losses: 9
- Draws: 1
- No contests: 0

Dawn Denise George (born April 30, 1959) is a former female boxer who has competed against some of women's boxing's top athletes. George moved to Lowell, where Micky Ward, another retired boxer, was born.

George had a negative win-loss record, largely because she was 39 when she debuted in professional boxing.

Dawn George debuted as a paid boxer on April 10, 1998, earning a four-round decision win over Angela Reiss at Worcester. On August 2, she knocked out Jackie Starkey in the first round, but, nineteen days later, she suffered her first defeat: in what was her first fight outside Massachusetts, she lost a six-round decision to the more experienced and younger Mitzi Jeter. Next, she lost an eight-round decision to Hannah Fox on September 23, at Worley, Idaho.

George came back a victor for the third time in her career when she fought Selena Pelleter on November 20, winning by knockout, again in the first round. On March 26, 1999, she lost a rematch to Jeter by a four-round unanimous decision, in Cherokee, North Carolina. This marked the beginning of three losses in a row, including one by a four-round unanimous decision to Summer DeLeon in Temecula, California.

On July 28, 2000, she got what would turn out to be her last career win, knocking out Michelle Taylor in the second round, at the popular hangout, The Roxy, in Boston. On November 3, she drew with Amy Burton over four rounds in Verona, New York.

On December 15 of that year, she faced Chilean Patty Demick in Fort Lauderdale, Florida, and was defeated by knockout in the third round.

Despite her negative record, her next fight was for a world championship: on her first try to become a world champion, she faced Jeter for a third time, Jeter, who had already conquered the IWBF's world Welterweight title, defeated George for a third time, by a ten-round unanimous decision, to retain the title in Dorchester.

George's last fight was her second attempt to win a world title: On January 25, 2002, she faced Vienna Williams for the WIBF's vacant world Jr. Middleweight championship, losing by a first-round knockout in Dover, Delaware.

George retired with a record of four wins, nine losses and one draw, with three wins by knockout.

== Professional boxing record ==
14 fights	4 wins	9 losses
By knockout	3	1
By decision	1	8
Draws	1	

No.	Result	Record	Opponent	Type	Round, time	Date	Location	Notes
14	Loss		Vienna Williams	KO		2002-01-25	Dover Downs, Dover	vacant International Women's Boxing Federation World Super Welterweight Title
13	Loss		Mitzi Jeter	UD		2001-05-25	Teachers Union Hall, Dorchester	International Women's Boxing Federation World Welterweight Title
12	Loss		Patricia Demick	TKO		2000-12-15	Memorial Auditorium, Fort Lauderdale	
11	Draw		Amy Burton	PTS		2000-11-03	Turning Stone Resort & Casino, Verona	
10	Win		Michelle Taylor	TKO		2000-07-28	The Roxy, Boston	
9	Loss		Lisa Ested	TKO		1999-06-26	Tropicana Hotel & Casino, Atlantic City	
8	Loss		Summer De Leon	UD		1999-04-09	Pechanga Entertainment Center, Temecula	
7	Loss		Mitzi Jeter	UD		1999-03-26	Harrahs Casino, Cherokee	
6	Win		Serina Pelletier	TKO		1998-11-20	Leominster Armory, Leominster	
5	Loss		Hannah Fox	UD		1998-09-23	Coeur d'Alene Casino, Worley	
4	Loss		Mitzi Jeter	UD		1998-08-21	Baton Rouge	
3	Win		Jackie Starkey	TKO		1998-08-02	Fleet Center, Boston	
2	Win		Angela Reiss	SD		1998-04-10	Palladium, Worcester	
1	Loss		Gina Nicholas	TKO		1998-02-08	Harrah's Casino, Lake Charles	
