= Matt Griffin (American football) =

American football player and coach (born 1968)

Biographical details
- Born: May 9, 1968 (age 57); Gardner, Massachusetts, U.S.

Playing career
- 1987–1991: New Hampshire
- Position: Quarterback

Coaching career (HC unless noted)
- 1992: Plymouth State (QB)
- 1993: Plymouth State (OC/QB)
- 1994: Richmond (WR)
- 1995–1996: Northeastern (assistant)
- 1997–1998: Tennessee–Martin (OC/QB/WR)
- 1999: Maine (TE)
- 2000–2001: Maine (OL)
- 2002: Maine (OL/RC)
- 2003–2005: Tennessee–Martin
- 2006–2009: Murray State
- 2010: Jacksonville Jaguars (OA)
- 2011: Jacksonville Jaguars (OQC)
- 2012: Omaha Nighthawks (OC/QB)

Head coaching record
- Overall: 21–58

Matthew Jude Griffin (born May 9, 1968) is an American professional football coach and former collegiate player. He served as the head football coach at the University of Tennessee at Martin (UTM) from 2003 to 2006, and Murray State University from 2007 to 2009, compiling a career college football record of 21 wins and 58 losses.

== Coaching career ==
=== Early positions ===
Griffin began his coaching career from 1992 to 1993 at Plymouth State College in New Hampshire. From there he joined the University of Richmond in 1994, and then was at Northeastern University from 1995 to 1996. With the Huskies he oversaw the quarterbacks and the offensive backfield. From 1997 to 1998, Griffin served as offensive coordinator at the University of Tennessee at Martin, where he also coached the Skyhawks quarterbacks and wide receivers. In 1999, he joined the University of Maine, working with the tight ends during his first year. Griffin coached the Black Bears offensive line for the next three seasons, assuming additional duties as recruiting coordinator in 2002.

=== Tennessee–Martin ===
Griffin was named head football coach at the University of Tennessee at Martin on December 10, 2002. The Skyhawks had not won a conference game in six years prior to his arrival. Under Griffin, the team improved to 4–4 in Ohio Valley Conference (OVC) play and a 6–5 overall record by his third season in 2005. This was the first winning season for the Skyhawks since 1993. Griffin was subsequently honored by the Tennessee Sports Writers Association as Tennessee's College Football Coach of the Year.

=== Murray State ===
Griffin was named head football coach at Murray State University on December 12, 2005. In his first season, the Racers went 1–10 overall and 0–8 in OVC play. In 2007, the team minimally improved to 2–9 overall and 1–7 in conference play. Griffin's third season was his best, leading the Racers to a 5–7 overall record and a 4–4 mark in conference. In his fourth season, the Racers slipped back to 3–8 overall and 2–6 in OVC play. Following four straight losing seasons and an overall record of 11–34, Griffin was fired on November 16, 2009.

=== Post-Murray State ===
In 2011, Griffin was offensive quality control coach for the Jacksonville Jaguars of the NFL. The following year, he was offensive coordinator and quarterbacks coach for the Omaha Nighthawks of the UFL. Griffin returned to the college level in 2013 as director of player personnel at Georgia Tech. Griffin was fired from Georgia Tech in May 2014 after he was accused of abusing his expense account.

== Personal life ==
Griffin graduated from the University of New Hampshire in 1992 with a bachelor's degree in political science.

== Head coaching record ==
Year	Team	Overall	Conference	Standing	Bowl/playoffs
Tennessee–Martin Skyhawks (Ohio Valley Conference) (2003–2005)
2003	Tennessee–Martin	2–10	1–7	T–8th	
2004	Tennessee–Martin	2–9	1–7	9th	
2005	Tennessee–Martin	6–5	4–4	T–4th	
Tennessee–Martin:		10–24	6–18		
Murray State Racers (Ohio Valley Conference) (2006–2009)
2006	Murray State	1–10	0–8	9th	
2007	Murray State	2–9	1–7	10th	
2008	Murray State	5–7	4–4	5th	
2009	Murray State	3–8	2–6	9th	
Murray State:		11–34	7–25		
Total:		21–58			
