= Talker helmet =

American special-purpose naval combat helmet

Helmet, Sailor's, Steel, Mk2, Mod. 0
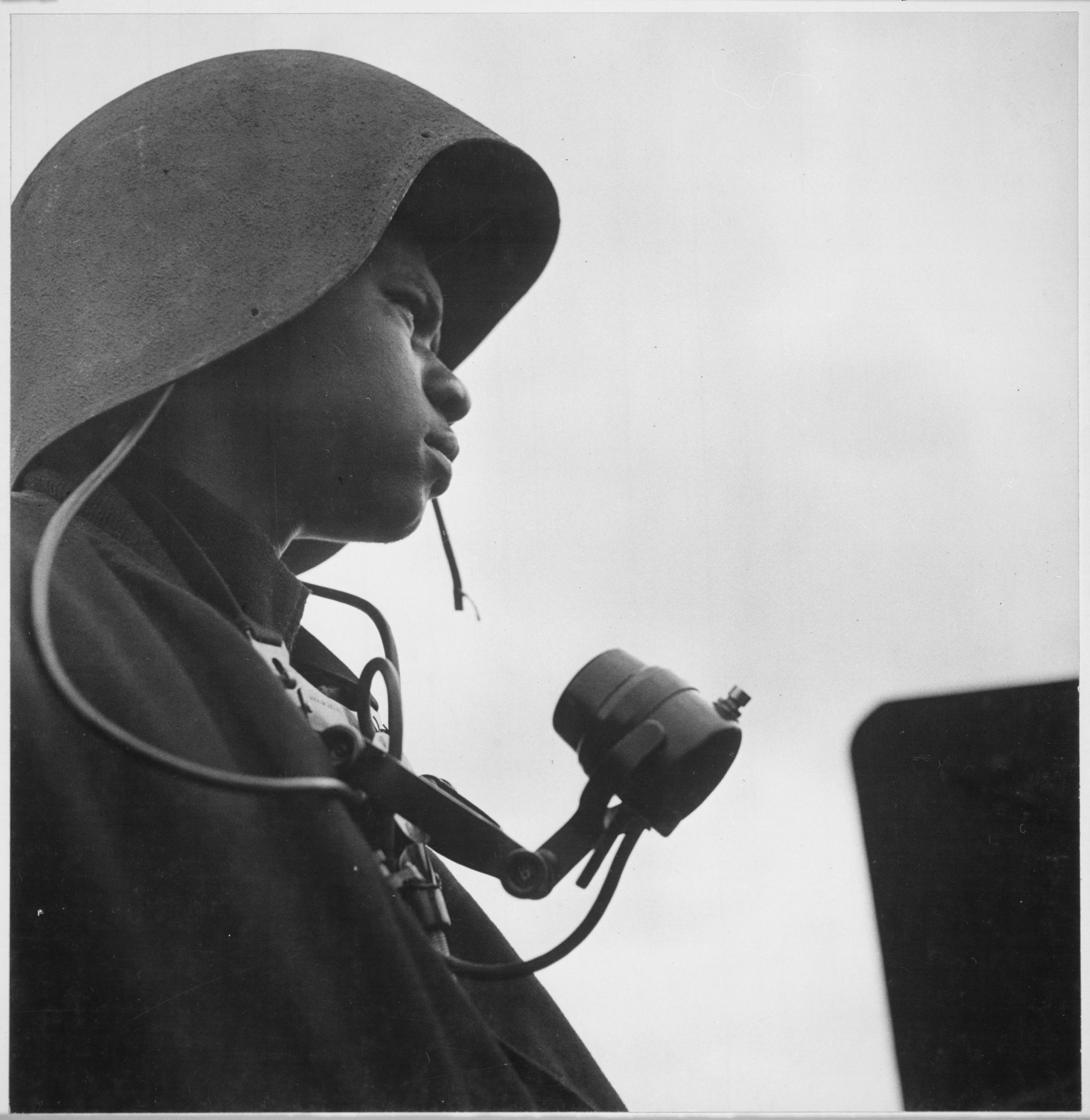
- A U.S. Navy sailor wearing a Mark II talker helmet aboard the USS Tulagi during Operation Dragoon in August 1944
- Type: Combat helmet
- Place of origin: United States

Service history
- In service: 1942 – present(?)
- Used by: United States Navy; United States Coast Guard; Bundesmarine
- Wars: World War II; Korean War; Iraq War

Production history
- Designer: Beaver Edwards
- Designed: 1941 – 1942
- Manufacturer: McCord Radiator Company; Schuberth-Werk

Specifications
- Width: 28.6 cm
- Height: 21.6 cm
- Diameter: 32.4 cm

The talker helmet or phone-talker helmet is a combat helmet used by the United States Navy and United States Coast Guard. It was originally designed in 1942 as a special-purpose naval helmet for deck crews that could fit additional equipment the contemporary M1 helmet was incompatible with, such as a sound-powered telephone headset.

The original talker helmet, the Mark II, was produced and used during World War II. An improved successor model, the Mark 4, was introduced in 1981 and remains in limited service.

== History ==
In 1941, the U.S. military had adopted the new M1 helmet for their combat and support personnel. The M1 helmet was designed primarily for infantry and lacked space and compatibility with specific equipment like telephone headsets, which, while less of a concern for the U.S. Army and Marine Corps, was relevant to the U.S. Navy and Coast Guard, which needed a helmet to protect sailors posted above deck, such as anti-aircraft gunners and communications personnel tasked with transmitting orders by sound-powered telephone ("talkers"). In September 1941, the Navy contracted the McCord Radiator Company to design and produce a new special-purpose helmet to protect sailors' heads from shrapnel and debris while also providing sufficient space to accommodate a telephone headset, a gas mask, and binoculars. The helmet was made of non-magnetic Hadefield manganese steel and was designed to be non-reflective to avoid making personnel visible, while the liner was made from cotton and later new padding materials such as Foamex, Velon, and Koroseal.

Prototypes were tested in late 1941 and, following the American entry into World War II after the attack on Pearl Harbor, the helmet entered production in February 1942. The new helmet, designated the "Mark II" or "Mark 2", was quickly issued for wartime service and was recorded to have effectively entered active service by May 1942, being used by U.S. Navy deck crews alongside the M1 helmet throughout the war.

McCord produced an estimated 400,000 Mark II talker helmets between February 1942 and June 1945 in olive green, deck blue, and gray. Refurbished examples remained in U.S. Navy service until the 1980s and 1990s at the latest.

In 1981, the Mark 4 talker helmet was introduced as a modernized replacement for the aging Mark II, which proved to be particularly vulnerable to rust due to its steel construction. The Mark 4 was produced by Gentex and featured Kevlar construction (predating the PASGT helmet by roughly two years) and memory foam-padded liners, but otherwise had a similar purpose and design to the Mark II. An improved variant designed by Gentex was tested in 1985 but ultimately not adopted.

Most Mark 4 talker helmets have since been retired due to age and technological advances allowing headsets to fit most modern combat helmets, though some remain in service, particularly with the Coast Guard.

== In popular culture ==
The Mark II talker helmet is known for being one of the inspirations for the Rebel Alliance helmets in the 1977 film Star Wars and the greater Star Wars franchise, with early examples being assembled from surplus helmets.

== Users ==
- France
- Germany
- Netherlands
- Sweden
- United States

== Gallery ==
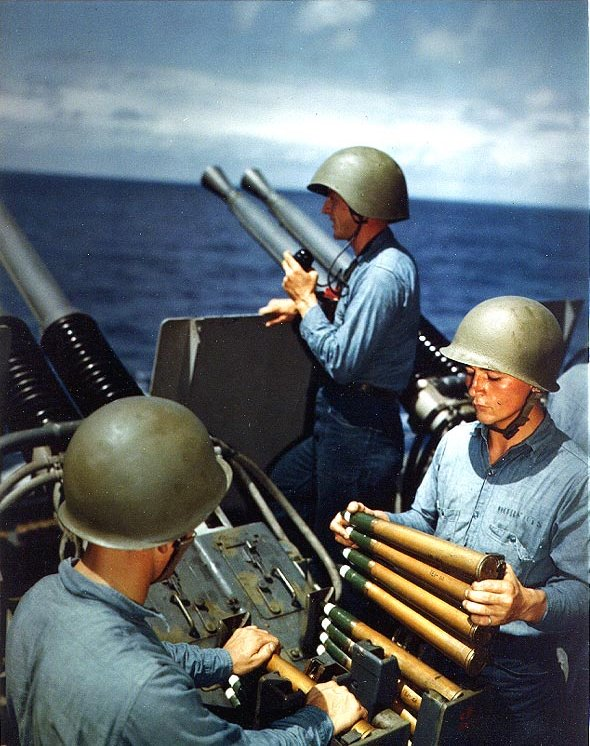
A Mark II talker helmet worn alongside M1 helmets by a 40 mm gun crew aboard the USS Alaska (CB-1) in 1945

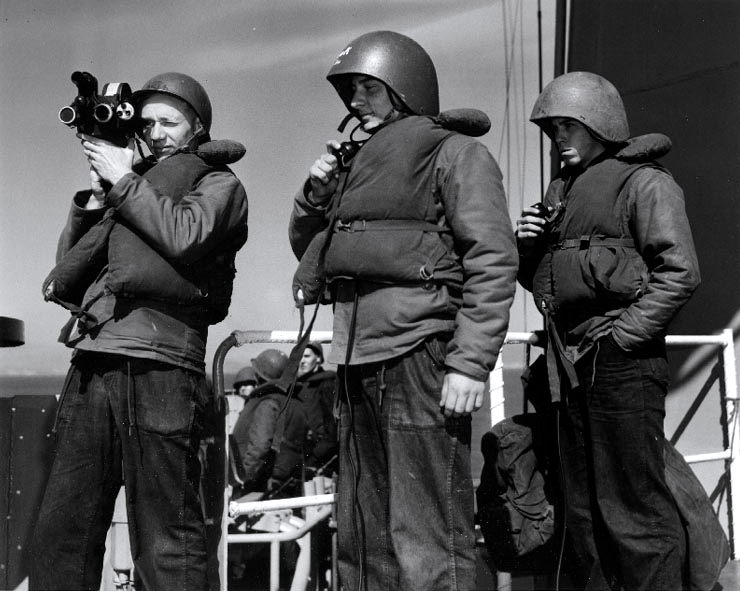
Sailors wearing Mark II talker helmets accompanying a photographer's mate capturing a bombardment by the USS Missouri (BB-63) in 1952

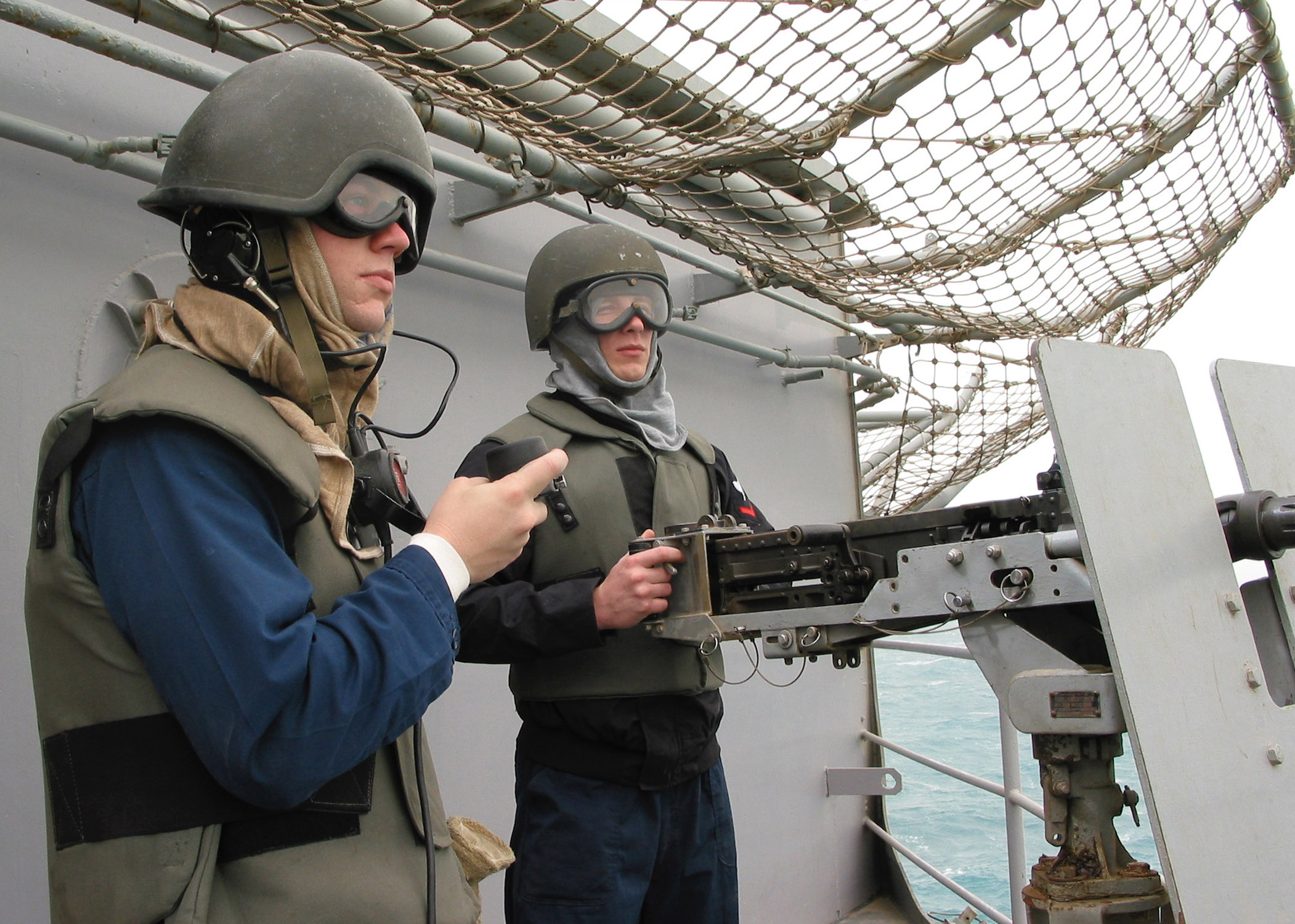
Petty officers wearing Mark 4 talker helmets manning a machine gun turret aboard the USS Tarawa (LHA-1) in 2003

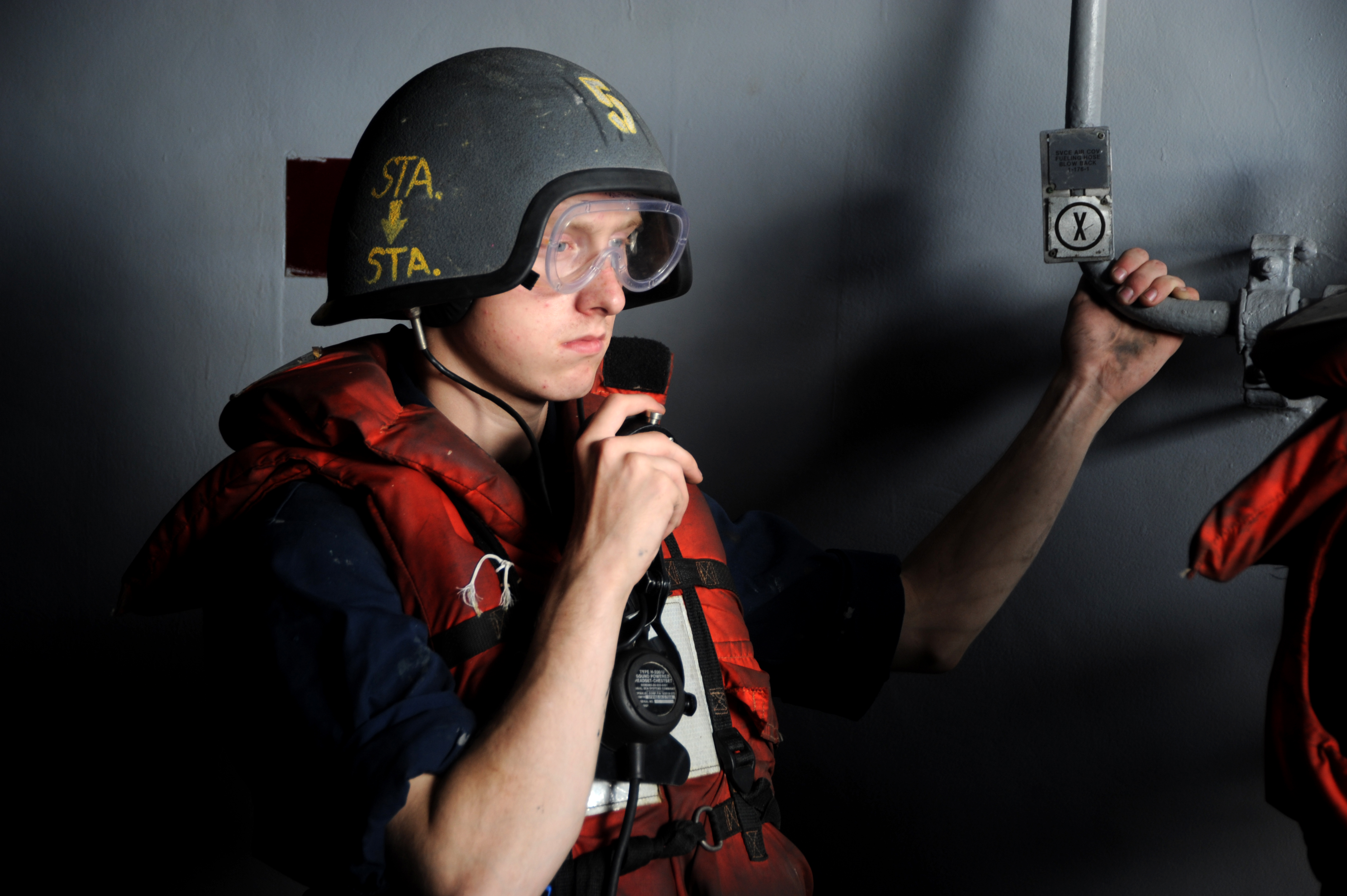
A sailor using a sound-powered telephone while wearing a Mark 4 talker helmet aboard the USS George Washington (CVN-73) in 2011
