= Dunn State Park =

State park in the U.S. state of Massachusetts

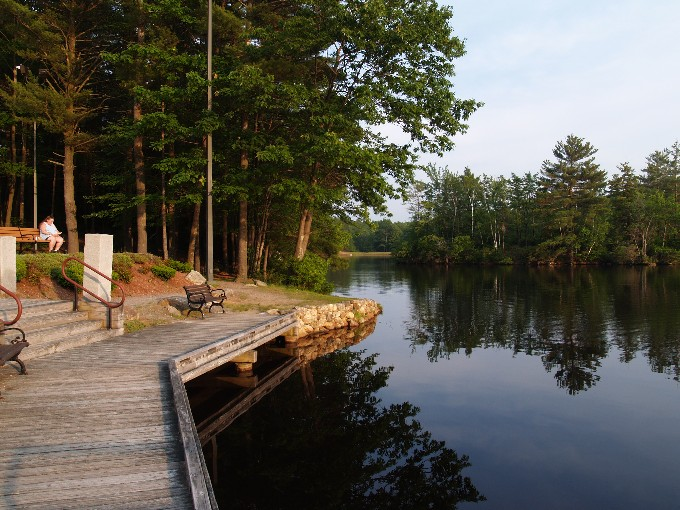
- Dunn Pond

- Location within Massachusetts Location within the United States
- Location: Gardner, Massachusetts, United States
- Coordinates: 42°34′42″N 71°58′18″W
- Area: 132 acres (53 ha)
- Elevation: 1,102 ft (336 m)
- Established: 1915
- Administrator: Massachusetts Department of Conservation and Recreation
- Named for: Furniture manufacturer John Ainsworth Dunn
- Website: Official website

Dunn State Park is a public recreation area surrounding a 20-acre (8.1 ha) pond in Gardner, Massachusetts. The state park covers 132 acres (53 ha) and is managed by the Department of Conservation and Recreation.

== History ==
The park's land was bequeathed to the city by furniture manufacturer John Ainsworth Dunn upon his death in 1915. The land was later transferred to the state. (Note: Dunn Pond is located on Rt. 101 (on Pearl St.) just off 140 and Rt 2. It is frequented by Picnic goers and family swimmers. There is a picnic area with almost a dozen picnic tables and fireplace grills. There is a nearby grassy knoll which is great for playing games or sports like Frisbee. A trail that encircles the pond has exercise, "Vita Courses" along the way. There are also little trails that veer off the main path for adventuring, fishing, or just to get a better view of the parks natural scenery. There are several locations around the lake to sit on a bench, and there are even more docks to fish from. One such location is accessible by car for Universal access/handicapped personnel only via Betty Spring Road. Visitors can drive up and park behind the lake and sit on the benches, the fishing dock, or visit the wooden bridge. Every year, the lake is stocked with fish. The state also hosts a myriad of events at the pond; from cross country races held by local schools During the summer, you can often catch the ice cream truck, which sometimes stops here. This is great for the kids, as are the two playgrounds by the public swimming area. There are Life guards on duty during daytime hours in the summer. you can bring your own canoe, kayak, paddle board. In the fall, runners from the nearby Gardner High School use the recently built bike trail. This is a great place to run or walk your stroller, dog, or friend for some exercise, and is a scenic and serene trek through the forest. The winter season is less frequented by visitors. however the lodge on the Dunn park grounds There is a warm fireplace and couches to sit on and public bathrooms are also in the lodge and available year round for changing or snacking. Park rangers are around all year to answer any wildlife or activity questions. A Totem Pole that was created in 1980's by Ralph Fleurant. It has been removed It was located towards the entrance.)
