= Hannah Fox =

American boxer

Personal information
- Nationality: (United States) American
- Born: Hannah Lee Fox; September 29, 1969 (age 56) Las Vegas, Nevada, United States
- Height: 5 ft 7 in (170 cm)
- Weight: Super featherweight

Boxing career
- Stance: Orthodox

Boxing record
- Total fights: 13
- Wins: 12
- Win by KO: 3
- Losses: 1
- Draws: 0
- No contests: 0

Hannah Lee Fox (born September 29, 1969), better known as Hannah Fox is a former female boxer. She is from Las Vegas, Nevada. Her nickname is "The Vegas", which made her name sound like "Hannah The Vegas Fox" when introduced to fans before a fight. She was inducted into the International Women's Boxing Hall of Fame in 2022.

Her first professional fight came on December 26, 1997, when she beat Heidi Tide by a decision in four, in Las Vegas. On her second fight, January 23 of 1998, she got her first knockout win, finishing her fight with Teara Anne Sanders in the first round.

Fox won her next seven fights in a row, with two knockouts. Among her foes during that initial, nine fight winning streak, were Tide in a rematch, Julie Birdsell, who antagonized Fox on Fox's first fight outside Nevada, with Fox winning an eight round decision at Biloxi, Mississippi, and the well known fighters, Diana Dutra, and Dawn George.

On January 15, 1999, she suffered her first, and only, career loss, when outpointed by Fredia Gibbs over eight rounds in Las Vegas. Fox, however, kept on the rise after this defeat: she had set her mind on one goal, and that was to become a world boxing champion.

After the loss to Gibbs came a rematch with Dutra, and Fox defeated the young hopeful, this time by a unanimous six round decision. Then, she fought Glenda Watkins, beating her by another six round decision, and becoming the IFBA's number one ranked challenger for the IFBA's world Jr. welterweight title.

On June 11, 1999, at Bossier City, Louisiana, she challenged Leah Mellinger for Mellinger's world Jr. Welterweight championship. Fox became the IFBA's world Jr. Welterweight champion by defeating Mellinger by a ten round decision.

With her dream finally accomplished, Fox retired, and has not made an attempt at a comeback.

Her boxing record was 12 wins, with only 1 loss, and 3 knockout wins.

== Professional boxing record ==
13 fights	12 wins	1 loss
By knockout	3	0
By decision	9	1

No.	Result	Record	Opponent	Type	Round, time	Date	Location	Notes
13	Win		Leah Mellinger	UD		1999-06-11	Bossier City, Louisiana, USA	International Female Boxers Association World super lightweight title
12	Win		Glenda Watkins	UD		1999-04-16	Orleans Hotel & Casino, Las Vegas, Nevada, USA	
11	Win		Diane Dutra	UD		1999-03-19	Orleans Hotel & Casino, Las Vegas, Nevada, USA	
10	Loss		(United States) Fredia Gibbs	UD		1999-01-15	Orleans Hotel & Casino, Las Vegas, Nevada, USA	
9	Win		Glenda Watkins	UD		1998-11-27	Orleans Hotel & Casino, Las Vegas, Nevada, USA	
8	Win		(United States) Dawn George	UD		1998-09-23	Coeur d'Alene Casino, Worley, Idaho, USA	
7	Win		(United States) Diane Dutra	UD		1998-08-22	Tropicana Hotel & Casino, Las Vegas, Nevada, USA	
6	Win		Hidi Tibe	UD		1998-06-26	Bally's Las Vegas, Las Vegas, Nevada, USA	
5	Win		Sarah Schmedling	TKO		1998-03-28	Tropicana Hotel & Casino, Las Vegas, Nevada, USA	
4	Win		Rhonda Hutchinson	KO		1998-02-21	Tropicana Hotel & Casino, Las Vegas, Nevada, USA	
3	Win		Julie Birdsell	UD		1998-02-15	Grand Casino, Biloxi, Mississippi, USA	
2	Win		Teara Sanders	TKO		1998-01-23	Orleans Hotel & Casino, Las Vegas, Nevada, USA	
1	Win		Hidi Tibe	UD		1997-12-26	Orleans Hotel & Casino, Las Vegas, Nevada, USA	
