= Red Blanchard (radio personality) =

American radio personality

Richard Bogardus "Red" Blanchard, Jr. (June 11, 1920 – June 16, 2011) was an American radio show personality in California markets from the mid-1940s to the mid-1960s whose shows were novelty- and comedy-oriented. He was also a musician and record producer and released a few novelty songs of his own in the early 1950s. Blanchard also added his voice to novelty songs written and performed by recording personality Nervous Norvus, and to radio commercials. In 1965 Blanchard became the technical director of the Los Angeles station KHJ-TV until he retired in 1978.

== Early life ==
Blanchard was born in Gardner, Massachusetts, to Richard Bogardus Blanchard, Sr., and Dorothy Rolfe Follett Blanchard. The family moved to California in 1921 but back to Gardner in 1935, where Blanchard attended Gardner High School for his sophomore through senior years. During that time he became a member of the Haywood-Wakefield Furniture Company Band, sponsored by one of the biggest furniture factories in New England at the time. Also, from 1935 to 1939, Red, who got his sobriquet from his bright red hair, played the trombone for a big band.

In 1940 he moved to Schenectady, New York, and started working for a defense plant.(GE) Three years later, in 1943, he volunteered for the United States Army Air Forces and was sent to the Greensboro, North Carolina, Basic Training Camp. According to his Website, "Red went into the army at age 23, when everybody else in basic training was about 18, so they made him a drill instructor (probably due to his loud voice)." After a few months the Army decided it had enough cadets at Greensboro and transferred Blanchard to March Field in Riverside, California.

While at March Field, Blanchard met his future wife, Phyllis East from Colton, California, and at about the same time the Army Air Corps transferred him again, this time to engineering school at Fort Belvoir, Virginia, where he remained for the rest of his military service and was discharged early in 1945. Phyllis East was also waiting there for him and they were married on July 12, 1945 in San Francisco. (Later one of Phyllis's sisters married one of Red's brothers.) Phyllis died of breast cancer June 1, 1986.

== Broadcast career ==
As a young man Blanchard was interested in radio. In 1938 he got his first ham radio license, W1LDI, and in 1968 the call sign, W6AG was issued by the U.S. Federal Communications Commission (FCC). He became a lifetime member of the Amateur Radio Relay League and was awarded a certificate for 60 years of service in 1999.

After the Army, Blanchard went to the west coast and worked for the rest of his career for various radio and TV stations in California and Nevada:

In radio as an on-air personality:

- KPRO, Riverside: 1945–January 1950.
- KCBQ, San Diego: February–December 1950.
- KLAS (now KLAV), Las Vegas: January–March 1951.
- KCBS, San Francisco: 1951–1955.
- GBS, San Francisco: 1955–present. (GBS, or General Broadcasting System, is a name owned by Blanchard. When he left KCBS he started syndicating radio shows and sometime within the next year registered the name General Broadcasting System with the U.S. Patent Office.)
- KFVD/KPOP, KABC, KFWB, and KNX, Los Angeles: 1956-1965.

In TV as Technical Director:

- KHJ-TV, Los Angeles: 1965-1978.

== On-air personality ==
By the time he got to KCBQ in San Diego, early in 1950, Blanchard had developed a formula of "...puns, parodies and gross-out gags, much of it delivered in a jive patois he called Zorch, with the occasional novelty record thrown in, [he] became a huge hit..." An article in the San Diego Daily Journal gave Blanchard the "Show of the Month" award and wrote, "Blanchard['s]... zany, screwball disk jockey show [was] quite funny. And rather catchy."

Over the years, Blanchard had collected a record library of around 3500 disks of bebop, jive/swing and unusual novelty numbers, plus a hundred or so disks of film stars in one-way interviews that were made for syndication so that the DJ or announcer had only to ask the written questions and let the disc give the impression that the stars were being interviewed live. On air, he would mix and match songs, interrupt to add the voice of a celebrity, put in recorded sound effects, and otherwise enhance the experience for his listeners.

Blanchard left San Diego for Las Vegas, Nevada, but didn't stay there long before he landed in northern California, in beatnik-populated San Francisco. Blanchard's popularity skyrocketed and by 1953, while he was at KCBS, both Time and Life magazines wrote about him. The Time article starts out, "In San Francisco, some teen-agers dye their hair green. Others pencil their eyebrows in red, paint cat's whiskers on their faces, wear purple lipstick. Their hats are trimmed with swizzle sticks, foxtails and pipe cleaners. Shouting the password 'Zorch!'... they storm into a radio studio in the Palace Hotel five nights a week to pay homage to a bop-talking disk jockey named Richard Bogardus Blanchard... His press agents describe [him] as [the] 'uncrowned king of juvenile Northern California.'" Blanchard said of his show, "It's a good thing this show happened in California. It's too Zorch for the rest of the country. They're not nervous and mixed-up enough or they'd be out here, too."

Blanchard developed many characters using his collection of voices, and would tape funny stories starring these characters to play on his show. Some of the more notable shows and characters were episodes of "Tombstone Bogardus," the "Junk Box Jury" sketch, "Mr. Moto, Famous Japanese Detective," and lovable old "Dr. Christian Bogardus." He kept his San Francisco fans busy "...mailing him dirt to 'help fill up San Francisco Bay,' or sending in empty orange juice cans to be used in building a 60-foot antenna. Twenty-five bottle caps earned a listener an 'I Dread Red' card [to play off the 'I Like Ike' campaign], and a usable joke is repaid with an 'I Write for CBS' certificate. His fans also enrolled in the 'I Listen to Red in Bed' club."

== Novelty/comedy records ==
One member of the "I Listen to Red in Bed Club" was long-haul trucker, songwriter, and singer Jimmy Drake. Drake was living in Oakland, California in the early 1950s when Blanchard was on KCBS, and became enamored of Blanchard's style. Drake spent a lot of his trucking downtime writing songs that "invoked in some fashion Blanchard, his program or both."

In late 1955, Drake, who did not see himself as a singer, sent one of his songs, "Transfusion," to Blanchard hoping Blanchard would record it. Blanchard thought Drake's song was almost perfect the way it was, other than the need for a little "added drama" Blanchard-style; so from his sound effects library, Blanchard added to Drake's recording the sound of an auto skid and car crash into appropriate spaces on Drake's tape. Blanchard finished the recording in about two hours, put it on the air and "Transfusion" immediately became a big hit.

Dot Records signed Drake up and made the record out of the tape that Blanchard made. "The final piece of the puzzle was for Jimmy Drake to transform himself into Nervous Norvus. In Blanchard's Zorch-speak, nervous meant 'cool' and its more conventional meaning, which aptly conveyed Drake's morbid bashfulness, made the word doubly suitable. The Norvus part Drake apparently invented out of thin air." "He just thought of a word to be alliterative to nervous," says Blanchard. "Transfusion" was released by Dot in May 1956 and reached the status of being in the top ten records in the country.

Blanchard himself made a couple novelty records: "Pagan Love Song," on which he did all the parts, and the more famous "Captain Hideous (King of Outer Space)." He collaborated with Nervous Norvus on other songs, notably "Ape Call;" the alleged story of the dinosaur age, during which Red would do a live Ape Call every few bars, while Nervous sang about the ancient creatures discovering each other. His Transfusion song ended with the words “Hey daddy-o make that type “O”. Atta boy! He made a live appearance at a Roos Atkins store on University Avenue in Palo Alto around 1953. It was a mob scene of preteens.

== Retirement ==
Blanchard lived in Escondido, California. His extended family (which includes a Richard Bogardus Blanchard V), are scattered from Oceanside, California to Kenilworth, Utah. He continued to operate his personal "redblanchard.com" website and General Broadcasting System, occasionally still playing the trombone, drums, piano, or guitar for his own amusement until his death from surgery complications. (He was a life member of the Musicians' Union, Local 47 of Hollywood.)

== Awards ==
- Inducted into the Bay Area Hall of Fame – October 1, 2008
- Awarded Amateur Radio Relay League certificate for 60 years of service – 1999
- Presented with a Clio Award for a commercial for Vision Windshield Cleaner on which he was the announcer – 1970
