= Seaman Paper =

American paper company

Seaman Paper Company of Massachusetts, Inc.
- Trade name: Seaman Paper
- Type: Corporation
- Industry: Pulp and paper
- Founded: 1945
- Headquarters: Gardner, Massachusetts, US
- Area served: Asia; Europe; North America
- Key people: Ken Winterhalter (CEO); Brian McAlary (COO)
- Products: craft paper; crepe paper; packing paper; tissue paper
- Brands: Satinpack; Spiro-pack; Gemstone; Satin Wrap; Slivv; Werola; Vela
- Owners: George Jones, James Jones
- Subsidiaries: Dennecrepe; First Mate Printing & Converting; MBW; Seaman Packaging Materials; Seaman Paper Asia; Seaman Paper China; Seaman Paper Europe; Seaman Paper Italy; Seaman Paper Vietnam; Specialized Paper Converting
- Website: seamanpaper.com

Seaman Paper is an American pulp and paper company based in Gardner, Massachusetts.

== History ==
The Seaman Paper brand is related to The Bermingham & Seaman Company of Chicago founded by George Seaman, his two brothers, and George Jones, appointing George M. Seaman as president. In 1911 the company opened a Detroit office, called Bermingham-Seaman-Patrick Company, with Robert A. Patrick serving as president and manager. In 1917 the Detroit company changed its name to Seaman-Patrick Paper Company while the Chicago firm adopted the Seaman Paper Company name. The Seaman Paper Chicago headquarter was the Ontario Building, a 1916 Chicago School style building at 411 West Ontario Street. From September 1942 till August 17, 1945, due to the WWII, the production was changed, and approximately between 2 and 4 million M-1 helmet liners were produced.

The Seaman Paper Company of Massachusetts was founded in 1945 when the Chicago-based Seaman family relocated to Massachusetts and purchased a mill in the village of Otter River in Templeton, MA. From 1946 to 1999 the company was guided by George Davenport Jones, born in Chicago and a veteran of WWII as a lieutenant in the Navy. In 1987 Seaman Paper founded Garlock Printing and Converting Corporation in order to produce solid color wrapping tissue. In 2015 Seaman Paper acquired the German manufacturer Werola. In 2016 Seaman formed a joint-venture with Pagliani Carta, an Italian manufacturer. In 2022 Seaman Paper acquired Eagle Tissue, of South Windsor, CT.

== Business ==
The company manufactures tissue paper for retail packaging, consumer and industrial products and is the largest crepe streamer manufacturer in the USA. Seaman Paper owns manufacturing facilities in North America (three locations), Asia (China, Hong Kong, Vietnam and India) and Europe ( (Germany) and Italy).

== Awards ==
- 2014 Retail Packaging Association Manufacturer/Supplier of the Year
- 2015 American Forest & Paper Association Sustainability Award for Energy Efficiency and Greenhouse Gas (GHG) Reduction
- 2017 American Forest & Paper Association Sustainability Award for Safety
- 2017 Retail Packaging Association Lifetime Achievemement Award
