= Blue Moon Diner =

- Miss Toy Town Diner
- U.S. National Register of Historic Places
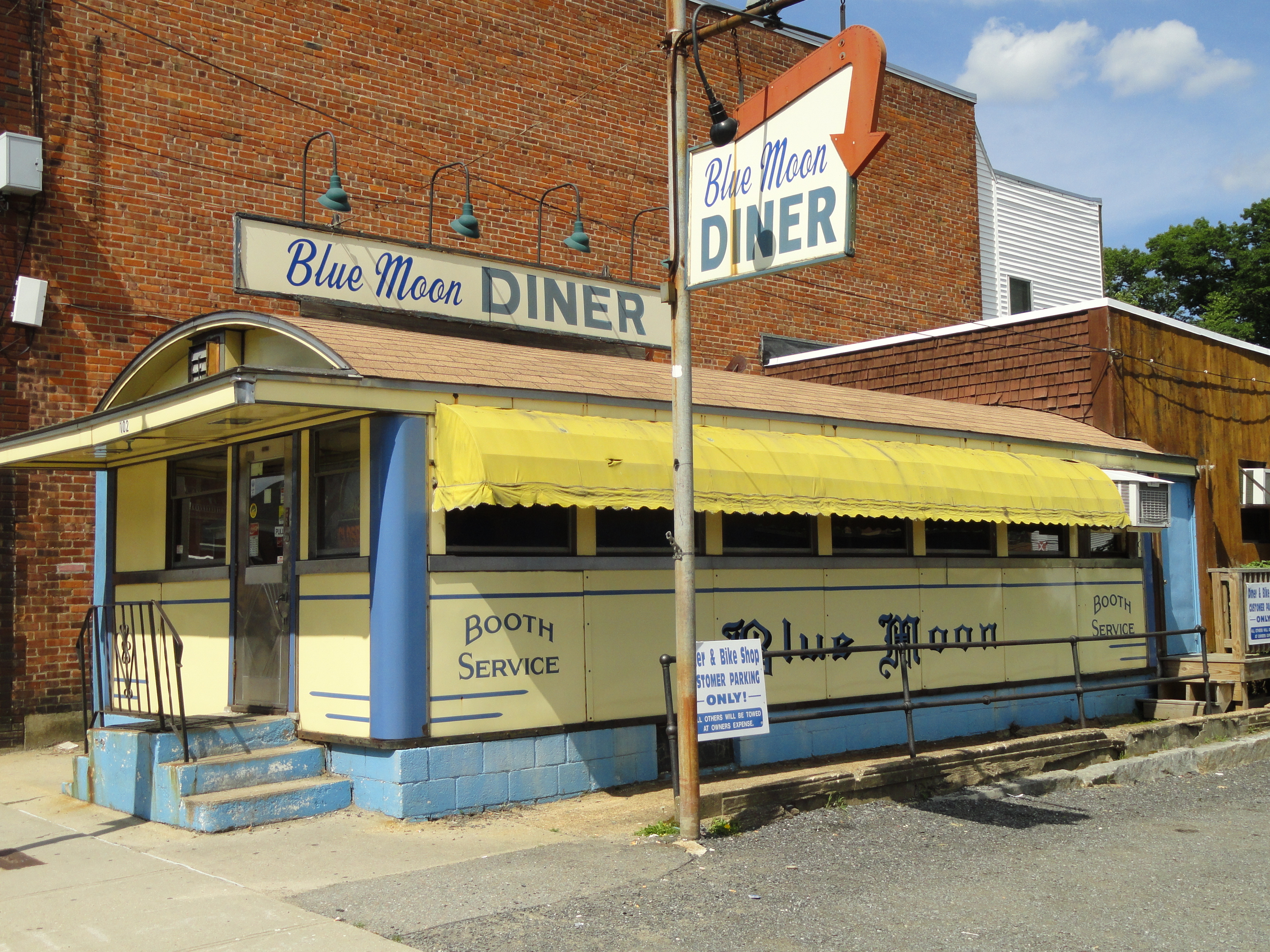

- Location within Massachusetts Location within the United States
- Location: 102 Main St., Gardner, Massachusetts
- Coordinates: 42°34′27″N 71°59′41″W
- Architect: Worcester Lunch Car Company
- MPS: Diners of Massachusetts MPS
- NRHP reference No.: 03001242
- Added to NRHP: December 4, 2003

The Blue Moon Diner, originally the Miss Toy Town Diner, is a historic diner in Gardner, Massachusetts. Built in 1949, it is a well-preserved example of a late-model barrel-roofed diner manufactured by the Worcester Lunch Car Company. It has been located at its present location since 1954. The diner was listed on the National Register of Historic Places in 2003.

== Description and history ==
The Blue Moon Diner is located on the east side of Gardner's Main Street, on the southern edge of the central business district. The diner is set on a concrete foundation and is oriented perpendicular to the road, with its parking area to the south. A wood frame addition to the east provides space for the kitchen and additional table space. The diner itself is seven bays long and three wide, and has a barrel roof, now covered in shingles. The main entrance is one of the diner's original entrances, at the western (street-facing) end, sheltered by a canopy; the eastern entry to the diner now provides access to the addition. The exterior of the diner is finished in porcelain enamel panels with integral polychrome graphics, and the entry doors are stainless steel. The interior features a marble counter, fourteen counter stools, and booths lining the southern wall. The booths are wooden, with tables that have laminated tops. Tile work on the interior is predominantly blue and cream, with accents in black and white.

The diner was built by the Worcester Lunch Car Company in 1949, and was originally located in Winchendon, where it was known as the Miss Toy Town Diner. It was moved to Gardner in 1954. The diner, which has seen a succession of owners, was restored in 1984 and is the only diner in Gardner.

The diner was used as a scene in the movie School Ties featuring Brendan Fraser. In the movie, the name of the diner was changed to Skip's Diner.

== See also ==
- National Register of Historic Places listings in Worcester County, Massachusetts
