= M1 helmet =

American combat helmet

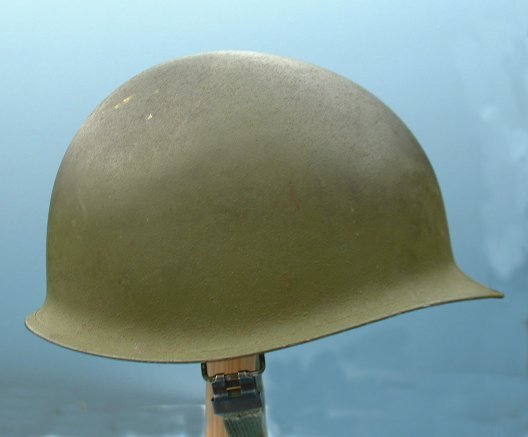
- View of an M1 helmet shell
- Type: Combat helmet
- Place of origin: United States

Service history
- In service: 1941–1985 (US)
- Used by: See Users for details
- Wars: World War II; Chinese Civil War; Indonesian National Revolution; Internal conflict in Myanmar; Korean War; Hukbalahap Rebellion; First Indochina War; Cuban Revolution; Algerian War; Civil conflict in the Philippines; Vietnam War; Suez Crisis; Laotian Civil War; Congo Crisis; Guatemalan Civil War; Portuguese Colonial War; Nicaraguan Revolution; Colombian conflict South African Border War; Dominican Civil War; Six-Day War; Nigerian Civil War; Football War; Cambodian Civil War; Ethiopian Civil War; Ogaden War; Eritrean War of Independence; War of Attrition; Black September; Yom Kippur War; Indo-Pakistani War of 1965; Indo-Pakistani War of 1971; Turkish invasion of Cyprus; Western Sahara War; Lebanese Civil War; Salvadoran Civil War; Sino-Vietnamese War; Internal conflict in Peru; 1982 Lebanon War; Iran–Iraq War; Falklands War; United States invasion of Grenada; United States invasion of Panama; Somali Civil War; Gulf War; Croatian War of Independence; Bosnian War; Insurgency in Khyber Pakhtunkhwa

Production history
- Designer: Major Harold G. Sydenham
- Manufacturer: McCord Radiator and Manufacturing Company and Schlueter Manufacturing Company
- No. produced: 22 million (1945)

The M1 helmet is a combat helmet that was used by the United States Armed Forces from 1941 to approximately 1985. Designed to replace the M1917 helmet, a variant of the British Brodie helmet used during World War I, the M1 helmet is known for having been used as the primary American combat headgear during World War II, with similarly extensive use in the Korean War and the Vietnam War. Owing to its extensive use throughout World War II and the Cold War, the M1 helmet has become an icon of the U.S. military, with its design inspiring copies and derivative designs used by other militaries around the world.

In 1985 the PASGT helmet, another similarly iconic and influential combat helmet design, was introduced and the M1 helmet began to be phased out. Some M1 helmets and their derivatives remain in service with several national militaries in the 21st century, although most have been relegated to being part of certain ceremonial uniforms, such as those of honor guards.

== History ==
=== Development ===
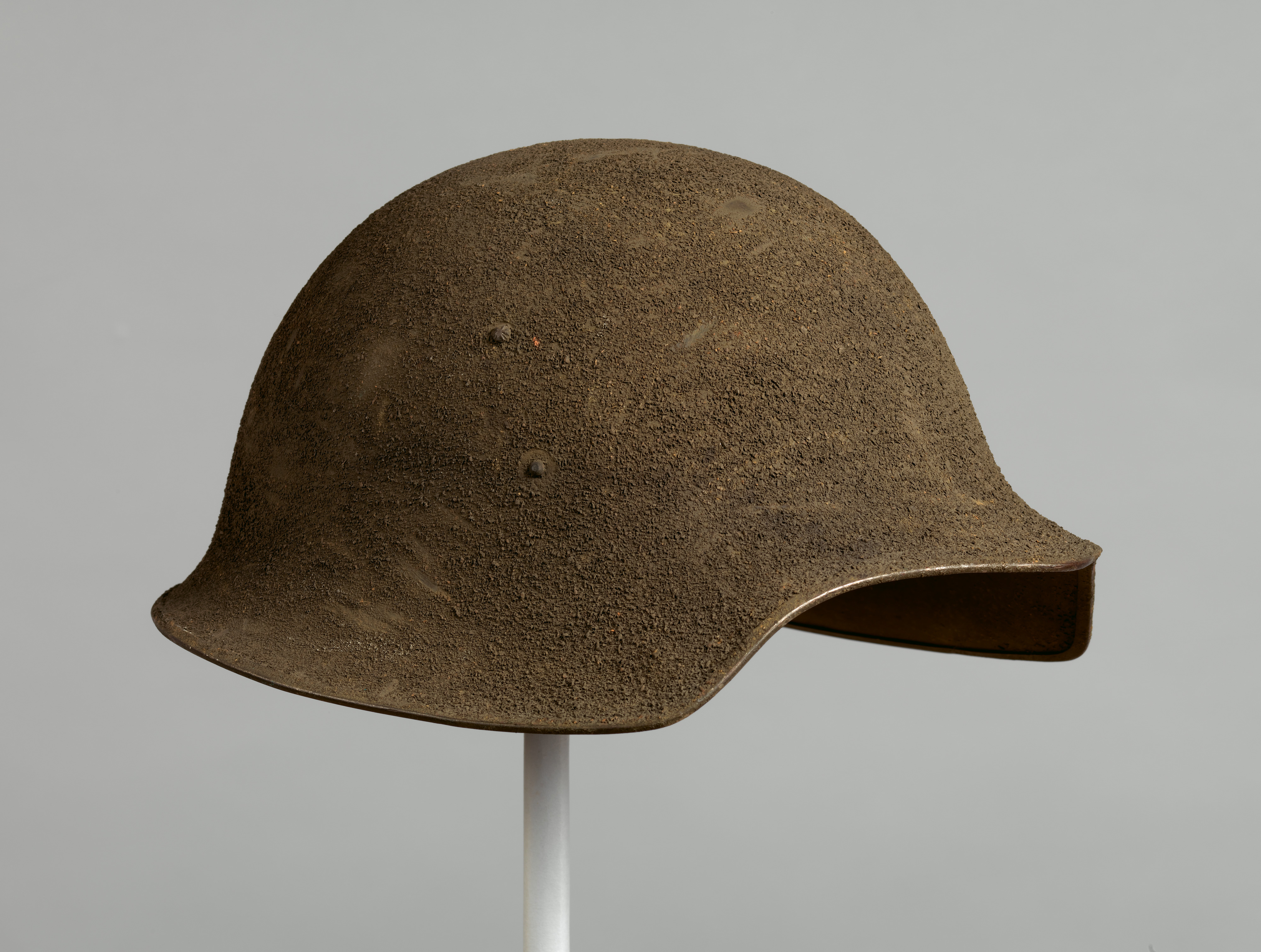
The Helmet Model Number 5, intended to replace the M1917 but not adopted

At the entry of the United States into World War I in 1917, the U.S. military did not have a combat helmet; initially, American Expeditionary Forces personnel were issued British Mk l helmets, while those integrated with French units were issued French M15 Adrian helmets. American production quickly began of an American variant of the Mk I, the M1917 helmet, with some 2,700,000 units produced by the end of the war. At that point, the shortcomings of the M1917, which lacked balance and protection of the head from lateral fire, resulted in a project to produce a better helmet which would also have a distinctively American appearance.

Between 1919 and 1920, a number of new designs of helmets were tested by the Infantry Board in comparative trials along with the M1917 and helmets of other armies. One of those designs, the Helmet Model Number 5A, was selected for further study. This was an improved version of the Helmet Model Number 5, developed in 1917 and 1918 by Bashford Dean, the curator of arms and armor at the Metropolitan Museum of Art, which had been rejected during the war because of its supposed resemblance to the German Stahlhelm. Eventually, tests held at Fort Benning between 1924 and 1926 showed that although the Helmet Model Number 5A offered better side protection than the M1917, it was more easily penetrated from above, and in some circumstances the shape of the helmet could interfere with properly holding and firing a rifle. Further ballistic tests at the Aberdeen Proving Ground resulted in the decision to retain the M1917 in 1934, which was then given a redesigned leather cradle and designated the M1917A1 or "Kelly" helmet.

In 1940, with World War II raging in Europe and Asia for a year and the United Kingdom seeking help from North America, it seemed increasingly likely that the United States would be dragged out of non-interventionism and into another war. The Infantry Board resurrected the quest to find a better type of helmet, since the ongoing conflict had shown that the M1917, designed to protect men standing in trenches from falling shell splinters and shrapnel, would be inadequate on the modern battlefield. The board reported:

Research indicates that the ideal shaped helmet is one with a dome-shaped top and generally following the contour of the head, allowing sufficient uniform headspace for indentations, extending down in the front to cover the forehead without impairing necessary vision, extending down on the sides as far as possible without interfering with the use of the rifle or other weapons, extending down the back of the head as far as possible without permitting the back of the neck to push the helmet forward on the head when the wearer assumes the prone position, to have the frontal plate visor and to have the sides and rear slightly flanged outward to cause rain to clear the collar opening.

Accordingly, the board, under the direction of Brigadier General Courtney Hodges, took the M1917 shell as the basis of the new prototype, trimmed off the brim, and added a visor and skirt-like extensions to protect the back and sides of the wearer's head. Rejecting the conventional systems of cradles, the new helmet was given a Riddell type liner and suspension system, based on the contemporary style of football helmet, with an adjustable strap for the nape of the neck to prevent the helmet from rocking. The resulting prototype was designated the TS-3, and the McCord Radiator Company manufactured the first examples from Hadfield steel. In tests, they were found to be able to resist a .45 ACP pistol bullet fired at point-blank range, exceeding the initial specification. The TS-3 was given official approval on June 6, 1941, and was designated "Helmet, Steel, M1". Full-scale production commenced almost immediately.

=== Service ===
Total production per year 1941–45
Year	Number made
1941	323,510
1942	5,001,384
1943	7,648,880
1944	5,703,520
1945	3,685,721

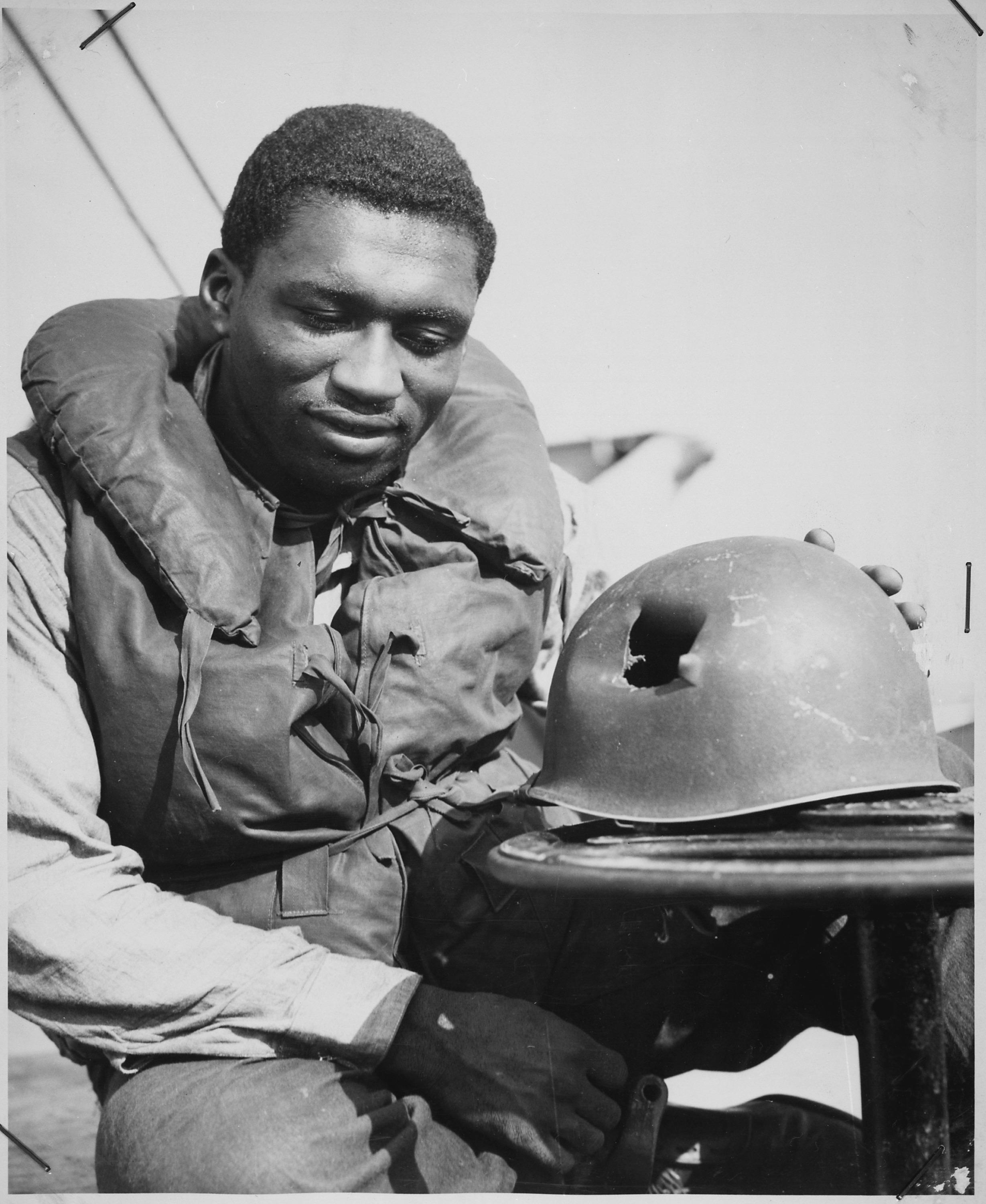
U.S. Coast Guard Fireman First Class Charles Tyner with his M1 helmet following Operation Dragoon in August 1944. His M1 helmet blocked a piece of shrapnel that would have otherwise fatally struck his head, inflicting a "superficial scratch" instead.

Over 22 million U.S. M1 helmets were manufactured through September 1945. Production was primarily accomplished by the McCord Radiator and Manufacturing Company and the Schlueter Manufacturing Company; the former developed a method to create an almost eighteen-centimeter-deep bowl in a single pressing, which was considered an engineering milestone at the time. A third manufacturer called Parish Reading is known to have produced a very limited number of M1 helmet shells in 1945.

In 1942, the helmet bails were changed from a fixed, welded version to a swivel model along with slight alterations to the shaping of the side brim, while in 1944, the stainless steel helmet rim with a seam at the front was replaced by a manganese steel rim with a rear seam. Further M1 helmets were manufactured for the Korean War.

Following World War II, the M1 helmet was widely adopted or copied by numerous other countries and its distinctive shape was adopted as the NATO standard. Postwar analyses of wartime casualty figures by the U.S. Army Operations Research Office found that 54 percent of hits to the M1 helmet failed to penetrate, and estimated that 70,000 men had been saved from death or injury by wearing it.

Production continued during the Cold War era with periodic improvements; in 1955 a grommet in the front of the liner was deleted, in 1964 the liner construction was changed to laminated nylon, and in 1975 a new chinstrap design was introduced. The final contract for U.S. M1 helmets was placed in 1976. The M1 was phased out of U.S. military service during the 1980s in favor of the PASGT helmet, which offered increased ergonomics and ballistic protection.

== Design ==
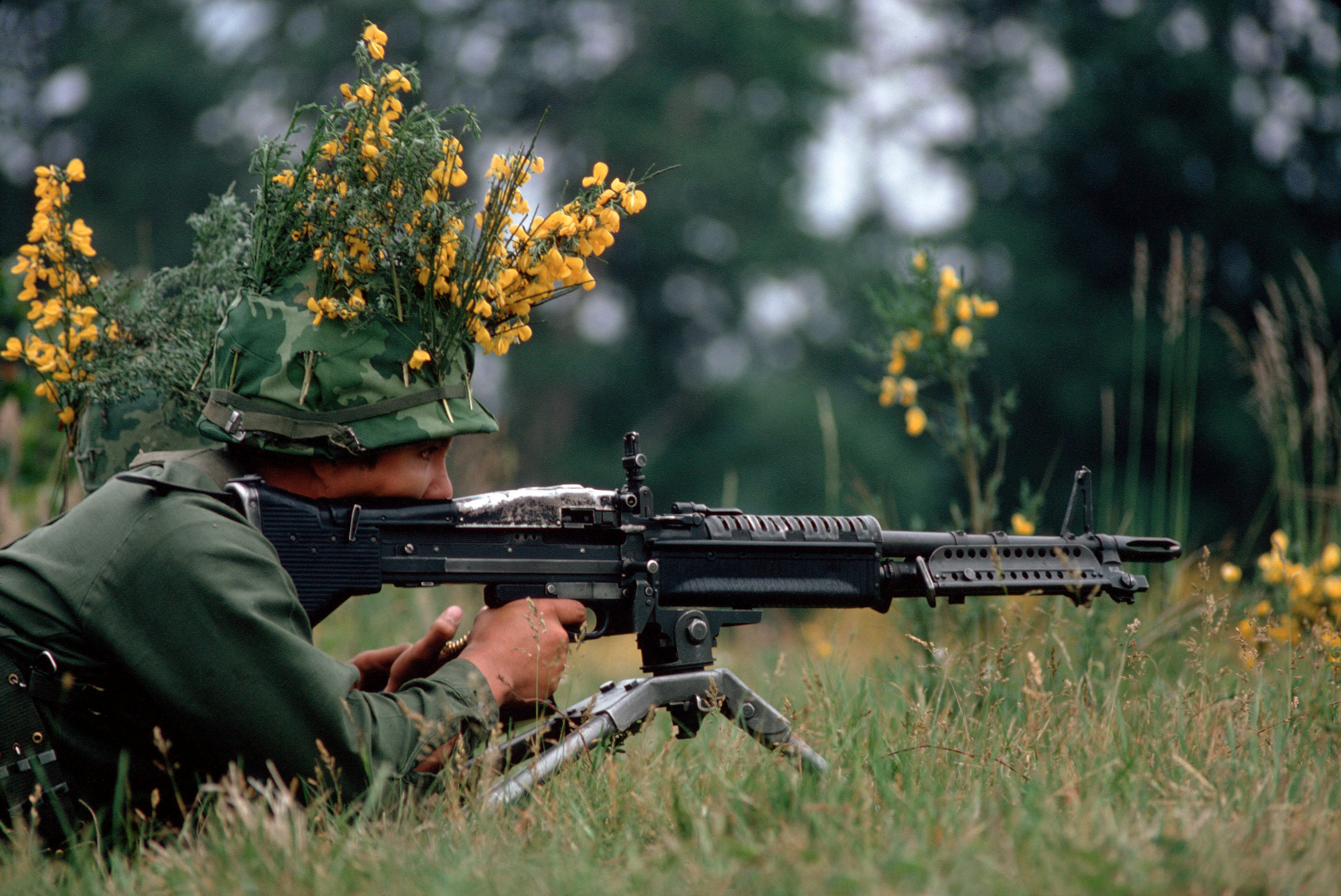
A U.S. Army machine-gunner wearing an M1 helmet with a camouflage cover and additional natural camouflage added on the slots in the helmet's cover

The M1 is a combination of two "one-size-fits-all" helmets—an outer metal shell, sometimes called the "steel pot", and a hard hat–type liner nestled inside it featuring an adjustable suspension system. Helmet covers and netting would be applied by covering the steel shell with the extra material tucked inside the shell and secured by inserting the liner.

The outer shell should not be worn by itself. The liner can be worn by itself, providing protection similar to a hard hat, and was often worn in such fashion by military policemen, Assistant Drill Instructors (known as AIs), and rifle/machine gun/pistol range staff, although they were supposed to wear steel at the range. The liner is sometimes worn in U.S. military ceremonies and parades, painted white or chromed. The depth of the helmet is 7 inches (180 mm), the width is 9.5 inches (240 mm), and length is 11 inches (280 mm), the steel shell thickness is 0.044 in (1.1 mm), The weight of a World War II-era M1 is approximately 3 pounds (1.4 kg), including the liner and chinstrap.

=== Shell ===
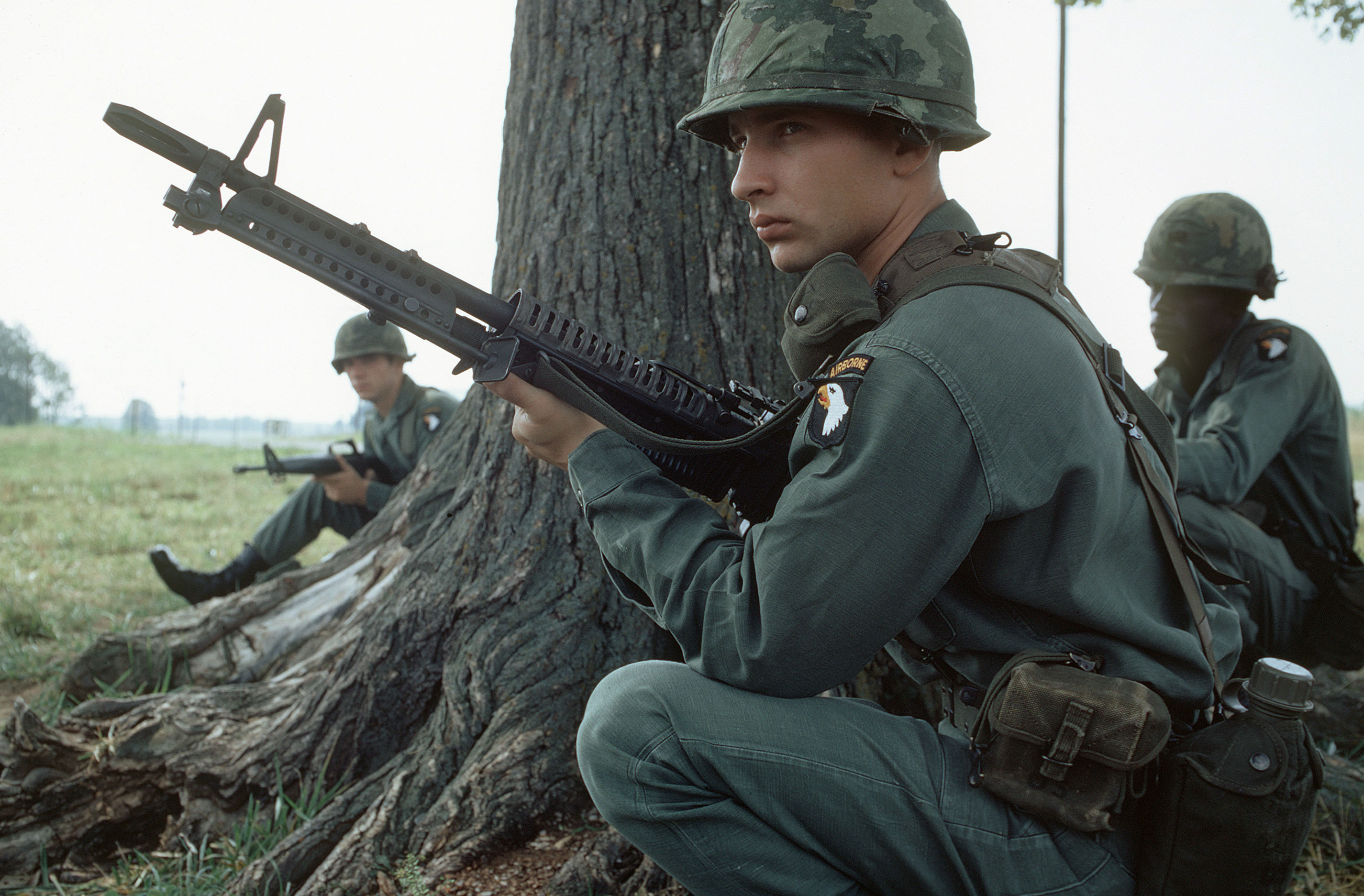
101st Airborne Division soldiers wearing M1 helmets during a training exercise in 1972

The non-magnetic Hadfield manganese steel for M1 helmet shells was smelted at the Carnegie Steel Company or the Sharon Steel Company of Pennsylvania. After being poured into fifteen-ton ingots (also called "heats"), the steel was divided into 216-inch by 36-inch by 4-inch blocks, known as "lifts," which were then cut into three equal 72-inch pieces to make them easier to handle. The cut lifts were sent to the Gary Works in Gary, Indiana for further processing, after which they were each reduced into 250 68-inch by 36-inch by 0.044-inch sheets, which were cut into 16.5-inch circles. The helmet discs were oiled and banded into lots of 400 for delivery by rail to McCord or Schlueter for pressing and final assembly.

Each "heat" of steel was assigned a unique number by the smelter, as was each of its "lifts". When each new heat was unloaded at McCord or Schlueter, it was assigned a sequential number, and each lift within the heat was assigned a letter of the alphabet (for example, the third lift unloaded of the forty-ninth heat received by McCord would be 49C). This unique "lot and lift" number was stamped onto each helmet produced from the discs of a particular lift, and allowed for traceability in case the helmets exhibited defects. The "lot and lift" number is in reference to the time when the fabricator received the helmet discs, not when they were made into finished helmets. Lifts of heats were not loaded onto or unloaded from railcars in any particular order, and were often warehoused (also in no particular order) before being finished.

M1 helmet shells manufactured during World War II can be identified by these 'lot and lift' numbers (also referred to as 'heat stamps'). Shells made by McCord during World War II will typically have a 2, 3, or 4 digit number followed by the 'lift' letter (for example '60A', '358B', or '1203A'). Shells made by Schleuter will have a 2 or 3 digit number followed by a 'lift' letter and a large 'S' can be found beneath the number. Both McCord and Schleuter heat stamps are typically found on the interior of the shell and beneath the front brim (but there are exceptions). Parish Reading shells can be identified by a heat stamp that is located to the side, underneath one of the swivel loops. These heat stamps always have a 'P' prefix and the heat stamps 'P1' through to 'P6' have been discovered as of 2025.

The helmet discs were drawn to a depth of seven inches to create the rough helmet shape, or "shell," and the edges were trimmed. The edge of the shell has a crimped metal rim running around it, which provides a smooth edge. This is usually known as the "rim". The rim has a seam where the ends of the strip meet. On the earliest shells the seam met at the front. This was moved to the back of the rim in November 1944 At this time, the rim also went from being made of stainless steel to manganese steel. On each side of the shell, there are stainless steel loops for the chinstrap. Early-war production shells had fixed rectangular loops, and mid-war to 1960s helmets feature movable rectangular loops; this feature was adopted in 1943 to address the problem that when earlier helmets were dropped, the fixed loops were more susceptible to breaking off. Early shells for paratrooper helmets feature fixed, D-shaped loops. The shells were then painted with flat Olive Drab shade 319 (1941–1966) or Munsell Y10 green paint (1966 onward), with the paint on the outside of the shell sprinkled with either finely ground cork (World War II era) or silica sand (postwar).

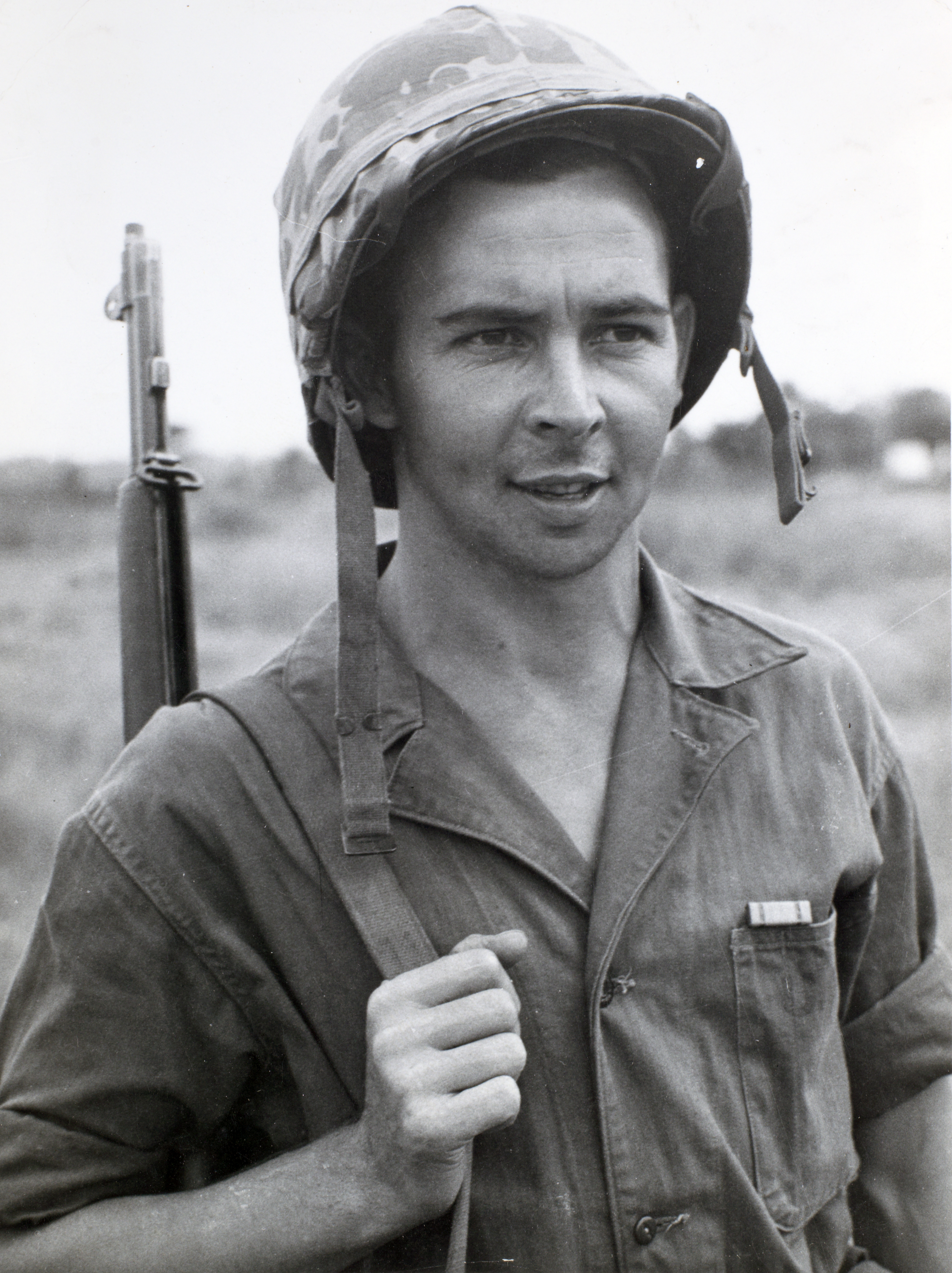
An M1 helmet with camouflage cover worn by a Netherlands Marine Corps corporal in 1945

World War II-production helmets feature sewn-on cotton web olive drab shade 3 chinstraps, replaced gradually throughout 1943 and 1944 with olive drab shade 7 chinstraps. 1950s and later production chinstraps are made of olive drab webbing attached to the loops with removable metal clips. Nylon chinstraps were introduced in the U.S. military in 1975. These straps featured a two-piece web chin cup and were fastened by a metal snap rather than buckle.

Many soldiers wore the webbing chinstraps unfastened or looped around the back of the helmet and clipped together. This practice arose for two reasons: First, because hand-to-hand combat was anticipated, and an enemy could be expected to attack from behind, reach over the helmet, grab its visor, and pull. If the chinstrap were worn, the head would be snapped back, causing the victim to lose balance, and leave the throat and stomach exposed to a knife thrust. Secondly, many men incorrectly believed that a nearby exploding bomb or artillery shell could cause the chinstrap to break their neck when the helmet was caught in its concussive force, although a replacement buckle, the T1 pressure-release buckle, was manufactured that allowed the chinstrap to release automatically should this occur. In place of the chinstrap, the nape strap inside the liner was counted on to provide sufficient contact to keep the helmet from easily falling off the wearer's head.

The design of the bowl-like shell led to some novel uses: When separated from the liner, the shell could be used as an entrenching tool, hammer, washbasin, bucket, bowl, or seat. The shell was also used as a cooking pot, but the practice was discouraged as it would make the metal alloy brittle.

=== Liner ===
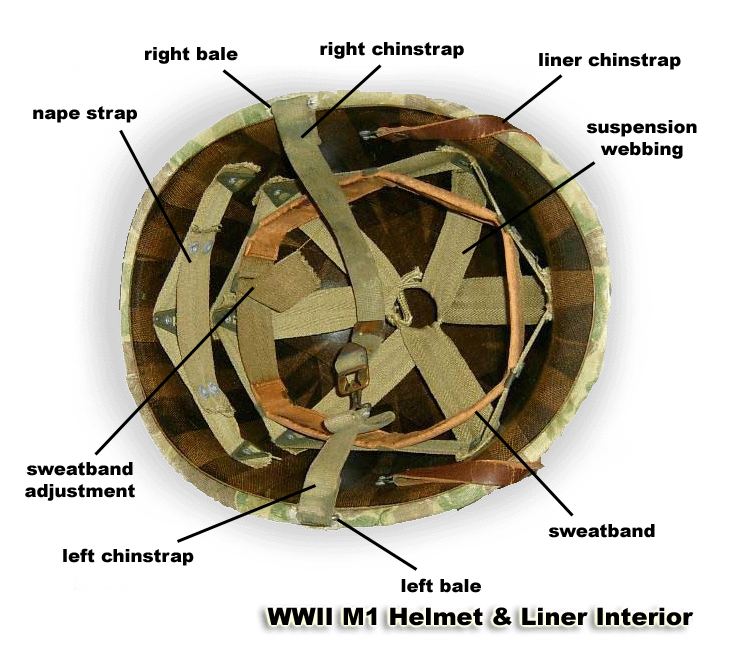
The interior of an M1 helmet liner

The liner is a hard hat-like support for the suspension, and is designed to fit snugly inside the steel shell.

The first liners were produced in June 1941 and designed by Hawley Products Company. The suspension was initially made from strips of silver rayon webbing stretched around and across the inside of the liner. A sweatband is clipped onto these, and is adjusted to fit around the head of the wearer. Three triangular bands of rayon meet at the top of the helmet, where they were adjusted by a shoestring to fit the height and shape of the wearer's head. A snap-on nape strap cushioned the liner against the back of the wearer's neck and stops it from falling off. As the rayon had a tendency to stretch and not recover its shape, the suspension material was later changed to olive drab number 3, and then olive drab number 7, herringbone twill cotton webbing.

World War II and Korean War-era liners have their own chinstrap made from brown leather. The liner chinstrap does not have loops like the shell; it was either riveted directly to the inside of the liner (early examples) or snapped onto studs. It can still swivel inside the liner. The chinstrap is usually seen looped over the brim of the shell, and helps to keep it in place when its own chinstraps are not in use.

Early liners were made from a mix of compressed paper fibers impregnated with phenolic resin, with olive drab cotton twill fabric stretched over the outside. They were discontinued in November 1942 because they degraded quickly in high heat and high humidity environments. They were replaced by evolving plastic liners, using a process developed by the Inland Division of General Motors. These liners were made of strips of cotton cloth bathed in phenolic resin and draped in a star shape over a liner-shaped mold, where they were subjected to pressure to form a liner. The initial "low pressure" process was deemed unacceptable by the Army, but accepted out of need. These liners were made by St. Clair Manufacturing and Hood Rubber Company. Hawley, Hood, and St. Clair's contracts were cancelled by early 1944, when a "high pressure" process which produced better-quality liners became commercially viable. Companies which produced "high pressure" liners during World War II included Westinghouse Electric & Manufacturing Company, Firestone Tire and Rubber Company, CAPAC Manufacturing, Inland (whose molds were acquired by Firestone after their contract was cancelled), Mine Safety Appliances Company, Seaman Paper Company, and International Molded Plastics, Inc.

Liners essentially identical in construction to "high pressure" World War II examples were produced between 1951 and 1954 during the Korean War by the Micarta Division of Westinghouse and CAPAC Manufacturing. In the 1960s, the M1 helmet liner was redesigned, eliminating the leather chinstrap, nape strap, and changing the suspension webbing to a pattern resembling an asterisk in a coarse cotton web material in lieu of the earlier cotton herringbone twill. In the early 1970s, suspension materials changed to a thicker, more flexible nylon with a rougher unbeveled rim. Later changes included a move to a yellow and green material for liner construction.

M1 helmet liners intended for use by paratroopers had a different construction. The short piece of webbing which held the nape strap at the back of the wearer's neck was extended around the sides of the liner, and terminated on each side in A-shaped yokes which hung down below the rim of the liner and had buckles for an adjustable chin cup made of molded leather. Two female snaps on the inside of the liner above the "A" yokes accepted male snaps on each of the steel shell's chinstraps, and helped to keep the liner inside the steel shell during abrupt or violent movements.

== Accessories ==
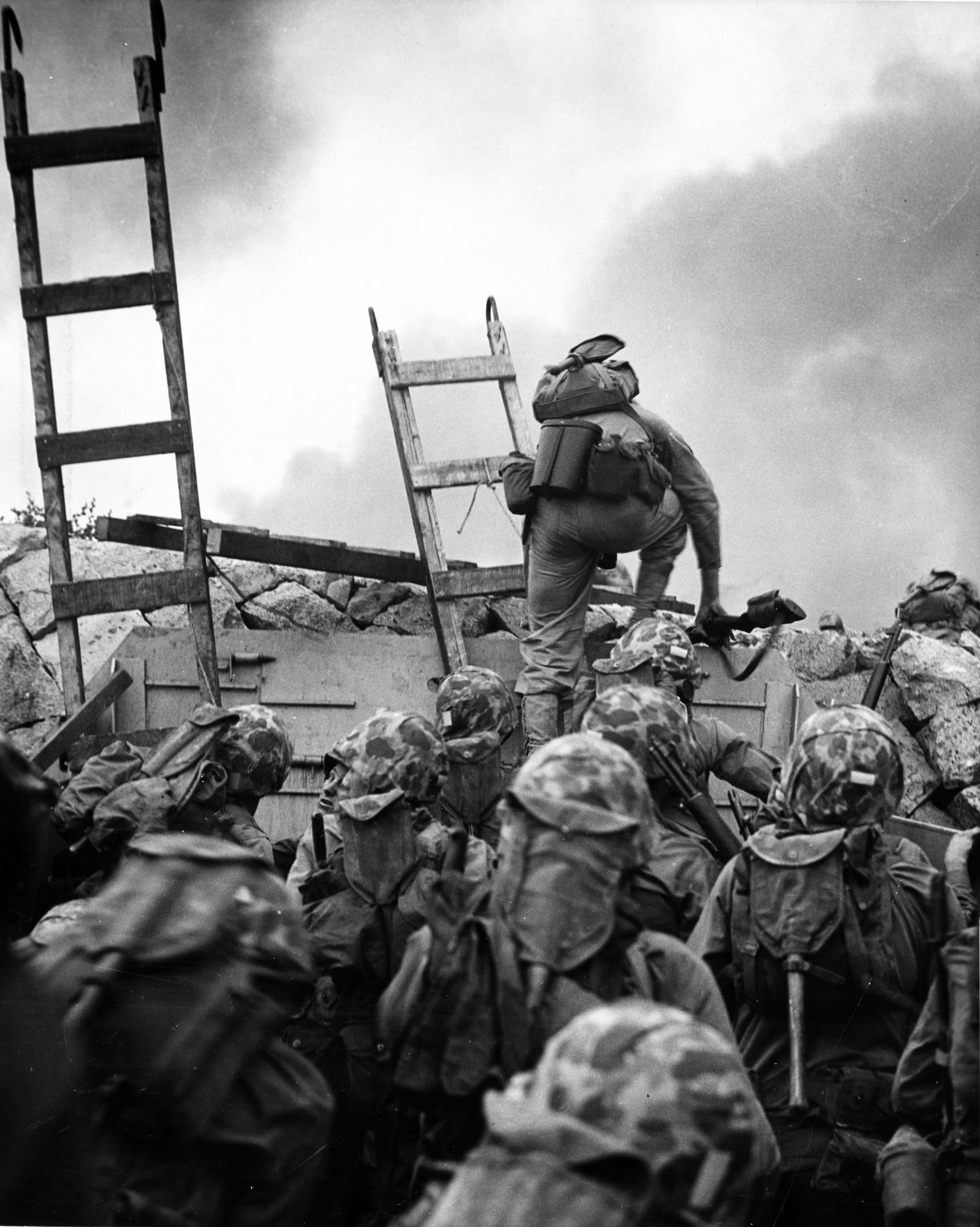
Camouflage-patterned helmet covers worn by U.S. Marines during the Battle of Incheon in 1950, during the Korean War

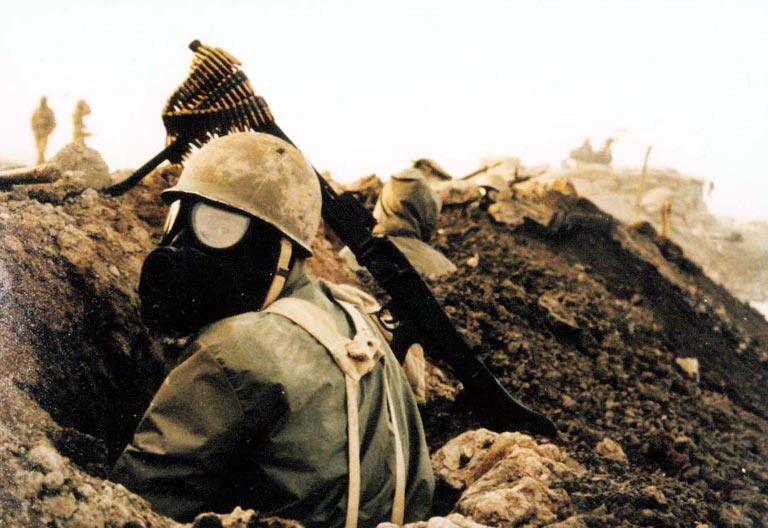
An Islamic Republic of Iran Army soldier wearing an M1 helmet and a gas mask in a trench during the Iran–Iraq War

In late 1942, the United States Marine Corps used a cloth helmet cover with a camouflage pattern for its helmets. The cover was made from cotton herringbone twill fabric. It had a "forest green" pattern on one side and a "brown coral island" pattern on the other.

The U.S. Army often used nets to reduce the helmets' shine when wet and to allow burlap scrim or vegetation to be added for camouflage purposes. Most nets were acquired from British or Canadian Army stocks or cut from larger camouflage nets. The Army did not adopt an official issue net until the "Net, Helmet, with Band" that included an elastic neoprene band to keep it in place.

After World War II, no new covers were issued. At the start of the Korean War in 1950, many soldiers had to improvise covers from burlap sandbags or parachute fabric. A consignment of 100,000 olive drab covers was dispatched to the theater, but the ship carrying them, SS Jacob Luckenbach, sank in a collision en route and they were all lost. In 1963, the Army and Marine Corps adopted a reversible fabric cover called the "Mitchell Pattern", with a leafy green pattern on one side and orange and brown cloud pattern on the other. This type was nearly omnipresent during the Vietnam War, where, for the first time, the Army wore the cloth camouflage as general issue; in Vietnam, the green portion of the reversible fabric camouflage was normally worn outermost. Helmet covers in the (European) Woodland camouflage were designed for fighting in the European Theater of Operations (NATO), and became the post-Vietnam jungle pattern camouflage cover used by the U.S. military from the late 1970s onward. The (European) Woodland pattern was only printed on one side and was not reversible, though some rare desert camouflage examples exist. These covers were all constructed from two semi-circular pieces of cloth stitched together to form a dome-like shape conforming to the helmet's shape. They were secured to the helmet by folding their open ends into the steel pot, and then placing the liner inside, trapping the cloth between the pot and the liner. An olive green elastic band, intended to hold additional camouflage materials, was often worn around the helmet to further hold the cover in place.

Other armies used these or similar covers printed with different camouflage patterns, or employed entirely different methods. In the Dutch Army, for example, it was common practice to use a square piece of burlap as a helmet cover on M1 helmets, usually secured by a net and a wide rubber band.

During the Battle of the Bulge and the Korean War, soldiers made white helmet covers as camouflage in snowy areas. They were not issued to soldiers, so many soldiers simply made them using white cloth from a shirt or tablecloth.

== Variants ==
M1
Standard model introduced in 1941 and issued until 1985. Different alterations were made to the M1's design at various stages of World War II, as well as during the Korean War and Vietnam War, but in general the M1 is the standard helmet of this type.
M2
Paratrooper variant introduced in January 1942. The main difference between it and the M1 is its D-shaped spot welded bails, as opposed to the M1's rectangular chinstrap bails. The chinstrap of the M2 also has a button snap on the end that allows it to be fastened to the liner. Otherwise, it is identical to the M1.
M1C
Improved version of the M2 helmet introduced in January 1945, replacing the M2 as the primary American paratrooper helmet until 1986. The primary difference with the M1C is its four-point "A-yoke" chinstrap with a leather chin cup, designed to support the head and neck and prevent adverse movement during jumps. It uses a belt loop-type connection to secure the chinstrap to the A-yokes, which can be opened or closed from either side and partially removed without tools. Otherwise, the M1C, like the M2, is nearly indistinguishable from the M1.
M3
"Flak" variant introduced in December 1943. The M3 was designed for United States Army Air Forces bomber crews due to their disdain for the M1, which was uncomfortable with headphones, too large to wear in ball turrets, and offered inadequate protection to the head against debris and bumps. Based on M1 helmet modifications first made by the 306th Bombardment Group in January 1943, the M3 helmet's most distinctive feature is its hinged steel ear covers lined with felt that protected against anti-aircraft flak and made the helmet compatible with headsets. The shell itself is lined with flocking to prevent the steel from freezing and ensure skin would not stick to it at high altitudes.
M5
Improved version of the M3 flak helmet introduced in February 1945. The M5 lacks the distinct swept brim of the other M1 variants and has deeper form-fitting ear covers. Another unique feature is the chinstraps being clipped to the swivel bails, which eventually became standard on postwar M1s. Some elements were taken from the Grow helmet, which was introduced for American aircrews in December 1943 as the M4 helmet.

== Users ==
=== Current ===
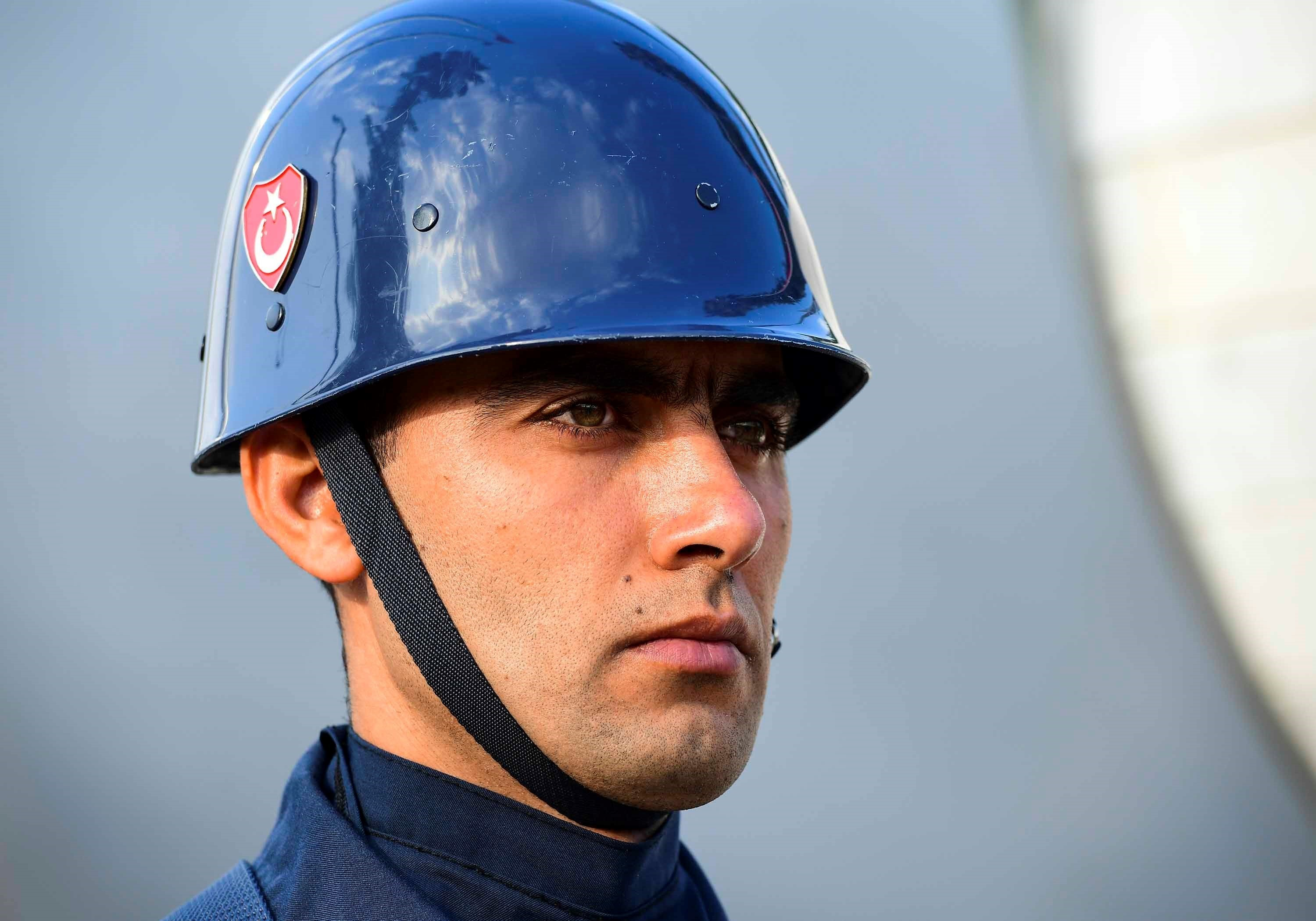
A Turkish Air Force serviceman wearing a ceremonial M1 liner during an Atatürk Memorial Day ceremony at Anıtkabir in 2019

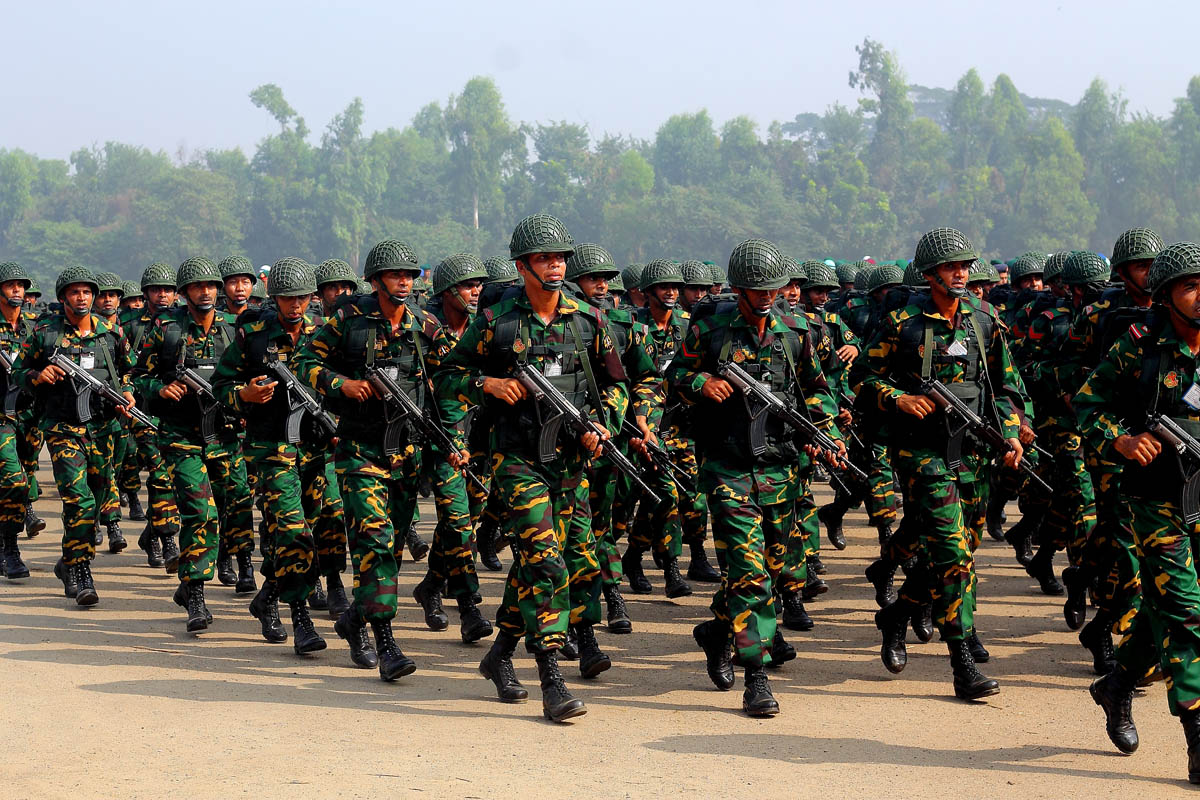
Bangladesh Army infantry wearing M1 helmets during a Victory Day parade in 2011

- China, Republic of: Used by the Republic of China Army during the Second Sino-Japanese War and the Chinese Civil War; issued as a combat helmet by Taiwan until the 1990s. Remains in use as a ceremonial helmet.
- Colombian soldiers in the Korean War using the M1
  Colombia: Some M1 helmets still in service with the Military Police and ceremonial units.
- Dominican Republic: Only used by honor guards in the Armed Forces of the Dominican Republic.
- India: M1 helmets are produced locally and are still in service with some Indian Armed Forces and Indian Police Service units.
- Iran: West German-made M1 helmets were used by the Imperial Iranian Army until the Iranian revolution. They remained in use with the Islamic Republic of Iran Armed Forces until its eventual official retirement, though some examples are reportedly still in use.
- Guatemala: Used only by the Guatemalan Army and Navy.
- Japan: Formerly used M1 helmets supplied by the U.S. until 1966, when the Japan Self-Defense Forces began issuing the Type 66 helmet, a locally produced variant. The Type 66 was replaced in frontline service by the Type 88 helmet in 1988, though they remain in use for non-combat roles and operations.
- Panama: Used by the former Panamanian militaries, with some units reportedly still used by the Panamanian Public Forces.
- Philippines: Formerly used by the Armed Forces of the Philippines as a frontline combat helmet. Remains in limited use as a training helmet.
- South Korea: Used by the Republic of Korea Armed Forces during the Korean War and the Vietnam War. Replaced by the Bangtan Helmet, which is loosely based on the M1 helmet.
- Turkey: Used by the Turkish Armed Forces before being retired from frontline service; currently remains in use as a ceremonial helmet.
- Uruguay: First units delivered between 1942 and 1945, with limited examples reportedly still in use by the Armed Forces of Uruguay.
- Vietnam: Some M1 helmets are still used by the People's Army of Vietnam, many of which were captured from American and South Vietnamese inventories during and after the Vietnam War.

=== Former ===
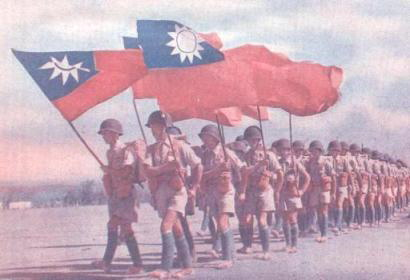
Chinese National Revolutionary Army soldiers with M1 helmets during the Second Sino-Japanese War.

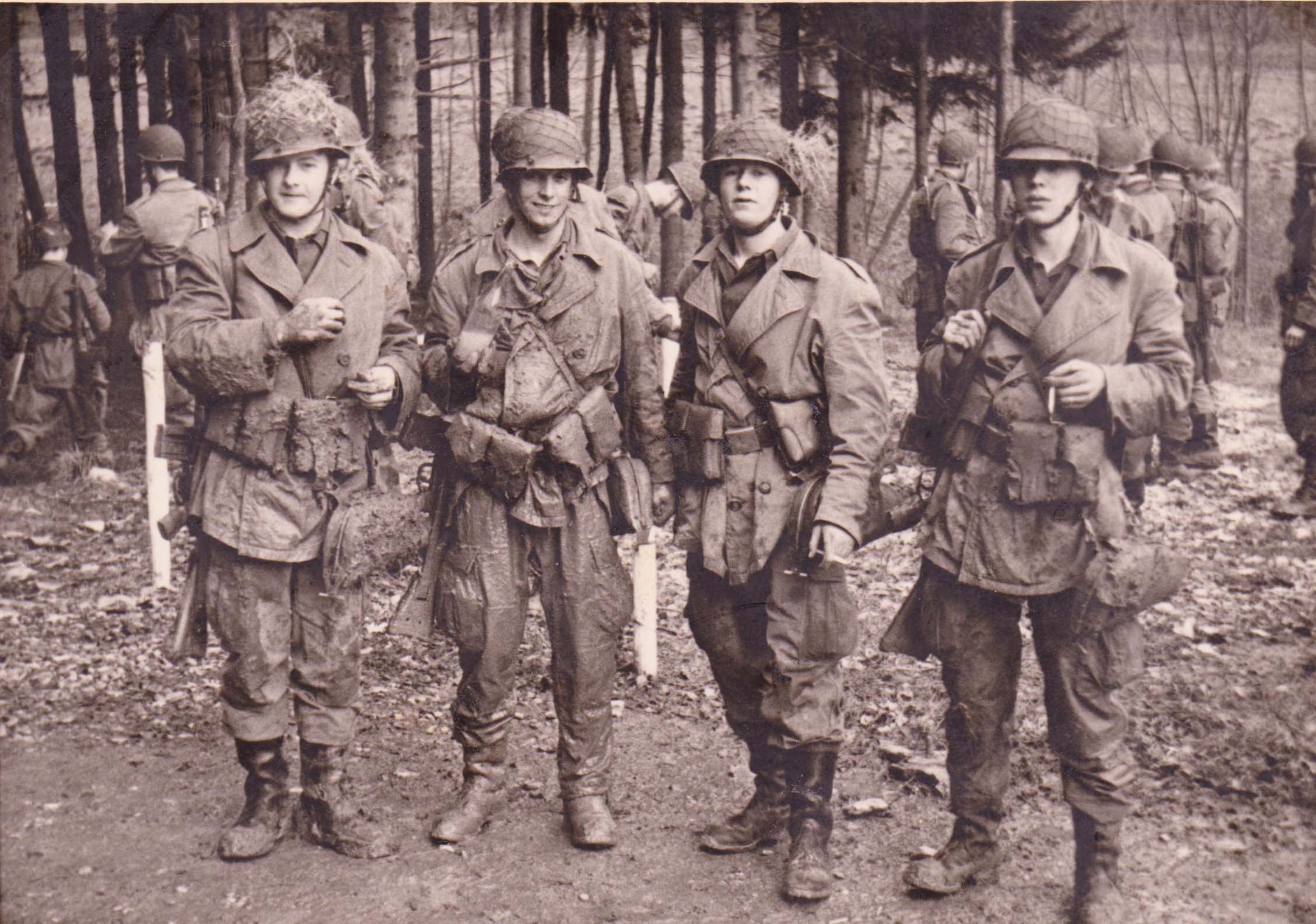
West German Army Panzergrenadier in 1968 wearing with M56 Stahlhelms adapted from American M1 helmets.

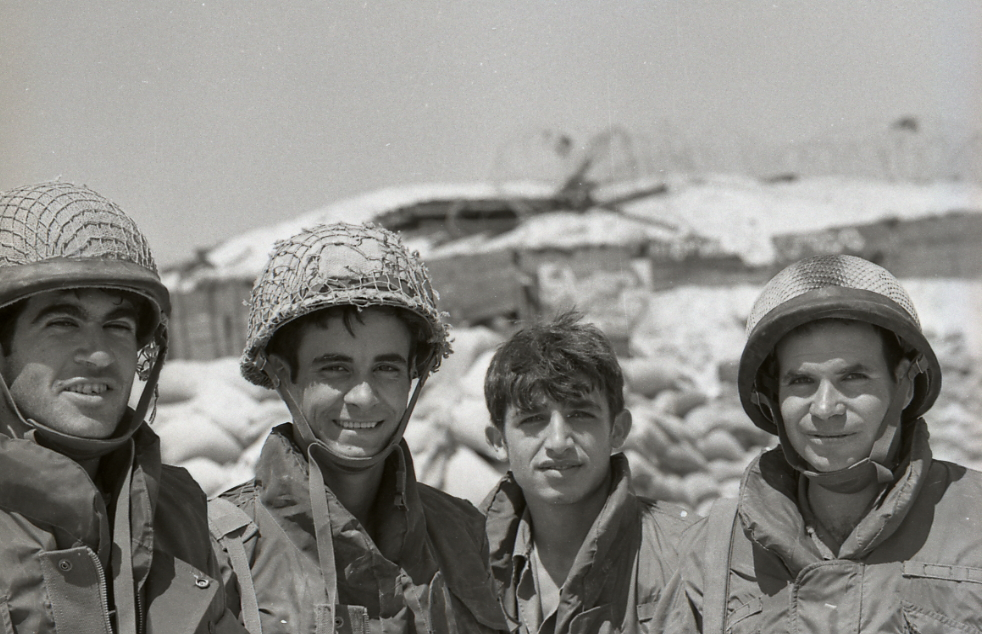
Israel Defense Forces soldiers wearing M1 Kasda helmets in 1970.

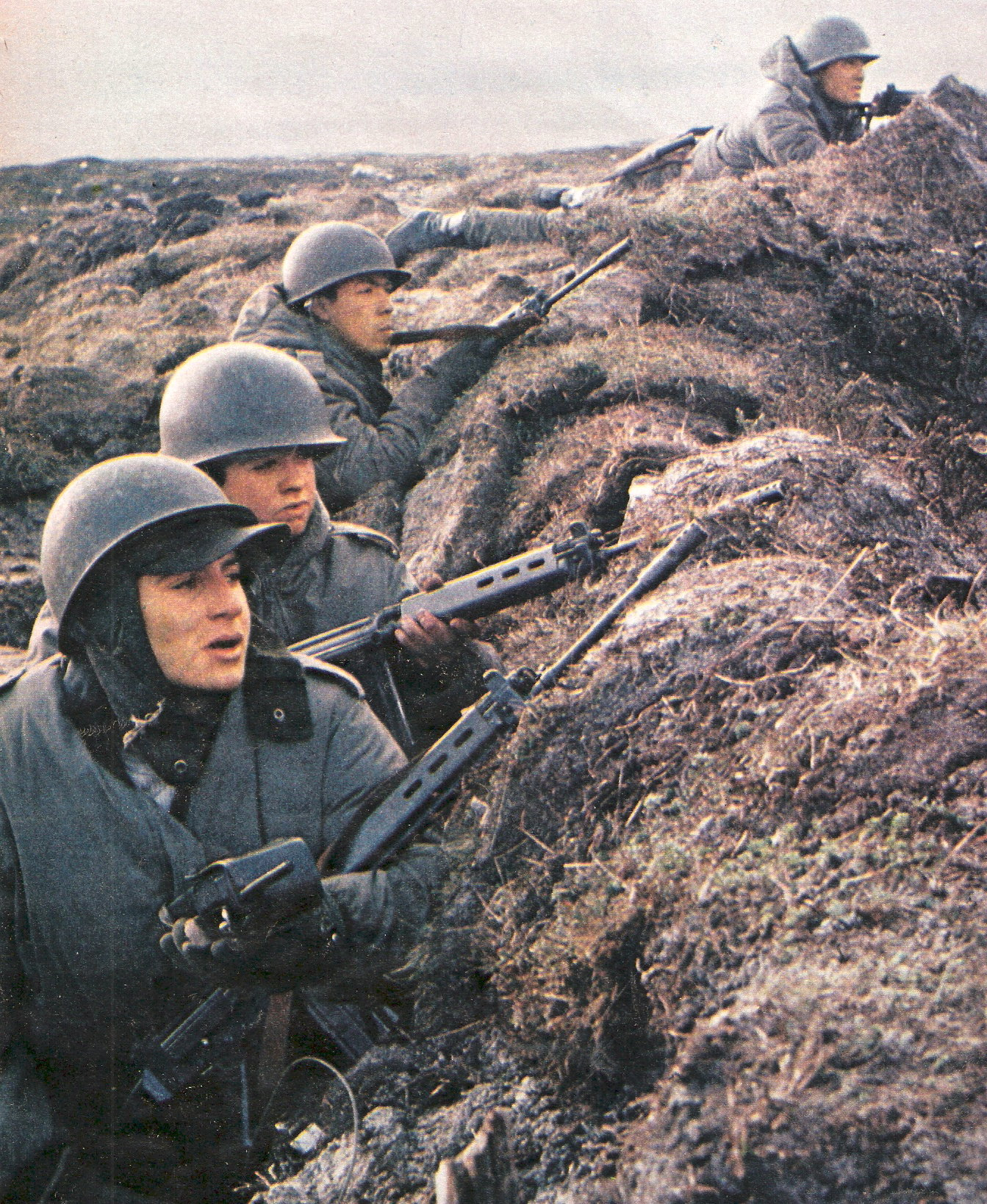
Argentine Army conscripts wearing M1 helmets during the Falklands War.

- Argentina: Used by the Armed Forces of the Argentine Republic before they were replaced.
- Australia: The Australian Defence Force used Australian and American-made M1 helmets from the 1960s to the 1990s. Replaced by the Australian-made M91 PASGT helmet in the early 1990s.
- Austria: Used by the Austrian Armed Forces after it was reformed in 1955, with 30,000 M1 helmets supplied by the U.S. Ulbrichts Witwe began producing M1 helmets in 1958, designated as the Stahlhelm 2 (M.58), with another variant made in the 1970s with a German helmet suspension.
- Belgium: Used Ulbrichts-made M1 helmets.
- Bosnia and Herzegovina: Formerly used by the Army of the Republic of Bosnia and Herzegovina with M81 Woodland camouflage.
  - Croatian Republic of Herzeg-Bosnia: Formerly used by the Croatian Defence Council with M81 Woodland camouflage during the Bosnian War.
- Brazil: Formerly used U.S. and Brazilian-made M1 helmets.
- Bolivia: Used U.S. and Brazilian-made M1 helmets before being removed from service.
- Canada: Used by the Canadian Armed Forces until the 1990s, when it was replaced by the CG634 helmet.
- Chile: Formerly used by the Chilean Armed Forces, with liners made by Baselli Hnos.
- Costa Rica: Formerly used U.S.-made M1 helmets.
- Democratic Republic of the Congo - Used during the Congo Crisis
- Croatia: Used during the Croatian War of Independence, with some remaining in service until the 2000s.
- Cuba: Used by the Cuban National Army until the Cuban Revolution, at which point they were retired by the Cuban Revolutionary Armed Forces and replaced by Warsaw Pact-made helmets.
- Denmark: Used Ulbrichts-made M1 helmets, designated the Staalhjelm model 48 (m/48).
- Ecuador: Formerly used by the Armed Forces of Ecuador.
- El Salvador: Provided by the U.S. in the 1970s as part of military aid, now replaced by the PASGT helmet.
- Ethiopia: First entered service with the Kagnew Battalion during the Korean War. Later saw service in the Ogaden War and the Ethiopian Civil War.
- France: Formerly used by the French Armed Forces, superseded by Modèle 1951 helmet in early 1950s.
- Greece: Adopted by the Hellenic Armed Forces in 1952.
- Haiti: Formerly used by the Armed Forces of Haiti.
- Honduras: Formerly used by Armed Forces of Honduras after signing the Rio Treaty.
- Indonesia: Obtained from the Netherlands after the Indonesian National Revolution in 1949 and used by the Indonesian Army until the 1990s.
- Israel: Formerly used by the Israel Defense Forces, supplied by the U.S., UK, and France. Some M1s used have a combination of American and Israeli parts with Kasda variants with "British" 3-point suspension strap offering improved support.
- Lebanon: Formerly used by the Lebanese Armed Forces. Replaced by the PASGT helmet.
- Liberia: Used by the Armed Forces of Liberia until the 2000s.
- Libyan Arab Jamahiriya: Seen in use by Libyan troops in Chad.
- Luxembourg: Formerly used by the Luxembourg Armed Forces.
- Malaysia: Used locally produced M1 helmets in the 1970s and 1980s.
- Mexico: Formerly used by the Mexican Army.
- New Zealand: Used by the New Zealand Army from 1961 to the 2000s. Gradually replaced by the PASGT helmet in the 1990s.
- Netherlands: Used Ulbrichts-made M1 helmets.
- Nicaragua: The Guardia Nacional de Nicaragua used M1 helmets supplied by the U.S. from 1954 to 1979.
- Nigeria: Formerly used by the Nigerian Armed Forces.
- Norway: Used Ulbrichts-made M1 helmets.
- Paraguay: Adopted the M1 helmet after signing the Rio Treaty.
- Peru: Formerly used M1 helmets supplied by the U.S., Israel, and West Germany.
- Saudi Arabia: Taiwan-produced copies were used by the Armed Forces of Saudi Arabia as late as the Gulf War.
- Singapore: Formerly used by the Singapore Armed Forces from the late 1950s to the mid-1980s, with inner liners made locally. Gradually replaced by a helmet similar to the PASGT helmet in the 1990s.
- Spain: Used M1 helmets made in the U.S. and Europe, modified for use by the Spanish Marine Infantry and Paratroopers Brigade "Almogávares" VI as the "Calimero" Casco Español Mº 65 (OTAN).
- South Vietnam: Used by the Army of the Republic of Vietnam until their dissolution after the fall of Saigon in 1975.
- United States: Formerly used by the U.S. Army, Marine Corps, Navy, and Coast Guard from 1941 to 1985 as the M1, with the Air Force using their own variants for flak protection designated the M3 and later the M5. Replaced by the PASGT helmet in all branches in 1985, though some reportedly remained in National Guard and Army Reserve inventories into the late 1980s and early 1990s, apparently seeing limited use in the invasion of Panama.
- Venezuela: Used by the Venezuelan military, now replaced. Majority made in the U.S. and South Korea.
- West Germany: Formerly used by the Bundeswehr, produced locally by the F. W. Quist Company. The original West German copy was a "two-piece steel helmet" ("zweiteiliger Stahlhelm") designated the M-62 Stahlhelm. In 1958, the M-62 was remade as a one-piece helmet and renamed the Stahlhelm M1A1, produced in three sizes: 66, 68, and 71. The M1A1 was issued until 1981, when a modified version was released and renamed the Helm1A1; modifications included a three-point chin strap with the third point connecting at the nape, extra large sizes, and a further adjustable liner. Use seemingly ended after German reunification in the 1990s.

== See also ==
- M1C helmet
- Modèle 1951 helmet
- Talker helmet
