= Gardner, Massachusetts =

- City
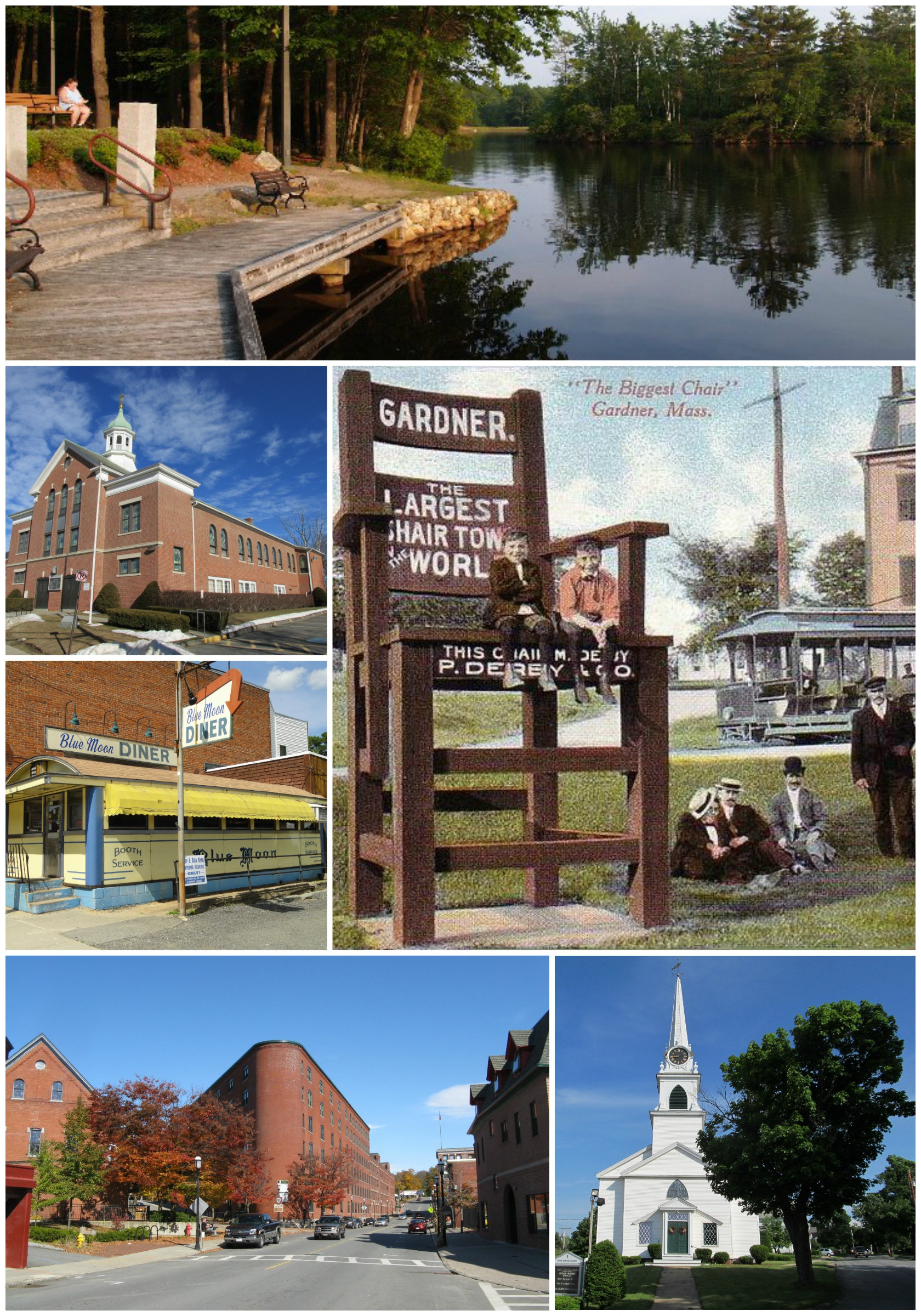
- From top, left to right: Dunn State Park; St. Joseph Parish; Blue Moon Diner; the Biggest Chair; Central Street at Heywood Place; First Baptist Church.

- Flag Seal
- Nicknames: The Chair City, G-Vegas
- Location in Worcester County and Massachusetts.

- Location in the United States
- Coordinates: 42°34′30″N 71°59′55″W
- Country: United States
- State: Massachusetts
- County: Worcester
- Settled: 1764
- Incorporated (town): 1785
- Incorporated (city): 1923

Government
  - Type: Mayor-council city
  - Mayor: Michael J. Nicholson (R)
  - City Council: Elizabeth J. Kazinskas (Council President); Calvin D. Brooks; Craig R. Cormier; Brad E. Heglin; Judy A. Mack; George C. Tyros; David R. Thibault-Munoz (Ward 1); Dana M. Heath (Ward 2); Paul G.Tassone (Ward 3); Karen G. Hardern (Ward 4); Aleksander H. Dernalowicz (Ward 5)

Area
  - Total: 23.02 sq mi (59.61 km^{2})
  - Land: 22.07 sq mi (57.15 km^{2})
  - Water: 0.95 sq mi (2.45 km^{2})
- Elevation: 1,063 ft (324 m)

Population (2020)
  - Total: 21,287
  - Density: 964.7/sq mi (372.46/km^{2})
- Time zone: UTC−5 (Eastern)
  - Summer (DST): UTC−4 (Eastern)
- ZIP Code: 01440
- Area codes: 978; 351
- FIPS code: 25-25485
- GNIS feature ID: 0610059
- Website: www.gardner-ma.gov

Gardner is a city in Worcester County in the Commonwealth of Massachusetts, United States. The population was 21,287 in the 2020 census. Gardner is home of such sites as the Blue Moon Diner, Dunn State Park, Gardner Heritage State Park, and Mount Wachusett Community College.

== History ==
Named in honor of Thomas Gardner, the land was first settled by Europeans in 1764 and was officially incorporated as a town in 1785, after receiving land grants from the surrounding towns of Ashburnham, Templeton, Westminster, and Winchendon. In circa 1805, Gardner became a center for lumber and furniture industries, and is now known as "The Chair City" and "The Furniture Capital of New England", due to its long history of production in that industry. By 1910, there were twenty chair factories, which produced four million chairs per year. It was also noted for silversmithing. The Gardner State Hospital pioneered the use of cottage residences.

In 1922, the seal of Gardner was designed by the native-born illustrator Harrison Cady. According to city code, the seal portrays Thomas Gardner standing in front of Crystal Lake with Mount Monadnock in the distance. Within five smaller circles there is a chair, representing the importance of the furniture industry to city economy, as well as the letters W, W, A, and T, representing the surrounding towns of Westminster, Winchendon, Ashburnham, and Templeton, which all contributed land to the city at its founding. Gardner was incorporated as a city in 1923.

Gardner is the birthplace of the Heywood-Wakefield Company, dating from 1826 when the five Heywood brothers, Walter, Levi, Seth, Benjamin, and William, began to fashion wooden chairs and furniture in a barn near their family farm. In the early years, Walter fashioned chairs by hand, also using a foot lathe. He was soon joined by Levi and Benjamin on a part-time basis, while running a nearby country store. In 1831, Levi moved to Boston, where he established an outlet store to sell the chairs, while Benjamin and William remained in Gardner to manufacture them. A fire destroyed their chair shop in 1834. A year later, the partnership of B. F. Heywood and Company was formed, composed of Benjamin, Walter, and William, as well as Moses Wood and James Gates. Gardner was also the home of the Conant Ball Company. Nichols and Stone Chair Company traces their origin to 1762 in Westminster, Massachusetts. The company moved to Gardner at the turn of the twentieth century. As of July 2008, it was announced production would terminate. The name, intellectual property, and the design rights were purchased by L. and J.G. Stickley of Manlius, New York.

Gardner is also home to the first practical time clock. It was invented in 1894 by Edward G. Watkins, while he was an engineer at Heywood-Wakefield when he was asked to make a better time clock to keep track of employees. After recognizing growing nationwide need for a better time clock, Watkins opened Simplex Time Recorder. In 1958, Simplex bought the IBM Time Recorder Division, which also included the fire protection division. This purchase helped propel Simplex to become a leader in fire alarms and business systems. Simplex would be owned and operated under the Watkins family for over a century with family including son, Curt, from 1942 to 1967, and grandson, Chris, from 1967, until it was sold in 2000, to Tyco International.

In 2009, the Annual Chair Luge began and takes place on the last Saturday in September in downtown Gardner and features teams of two racing down the streets in homemade chairs on wheels. The city is also home of the largest American Cancer Society Relay For Life event in New England. Gardner has recently been dubbed the "Model City for America" for the accolades the city has received for progress in infrastructure, community development, 41% reduction in crime since 2020, and advances in education including successful partnerships with Mount Wachusett Community College and Montachusett Regional Vocational Technical School.

== Geography ==
According to the United States Census Bureau, Gardner has a total area of 23.0 square miles (60 km^{2}), of which 22.2 square miles (57 km^{2}) is land and 0.8 square miles (2.1 km^{2}), or 3.52%, is water. The city is situated on Crystal Lake. Its highest point is the summit of Reservoir Hill, close to the city center, with an elevation of over 1,280 feet (390 m) above sea level.

Gardner is bordered by Winchendon and Ashburnham to the north, Westminster to the east, Hubbardston to the south, and Templeton to the west, all in Massachusetts.

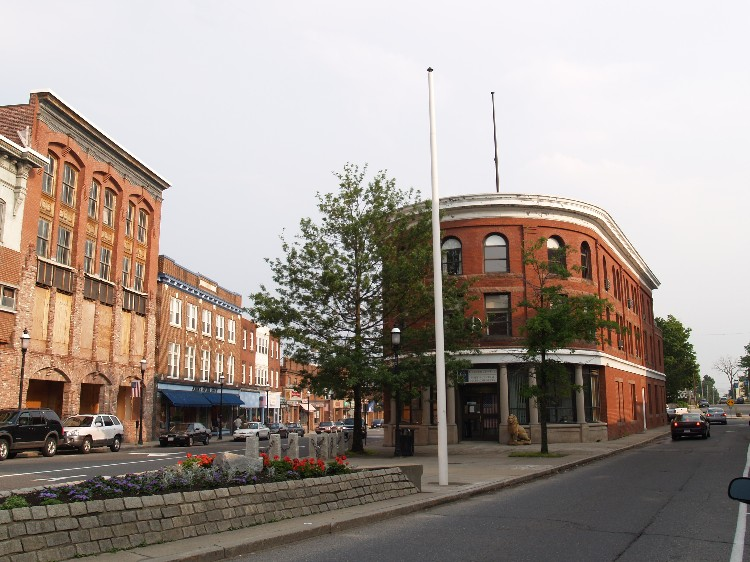
Downtown Gardner, 2005

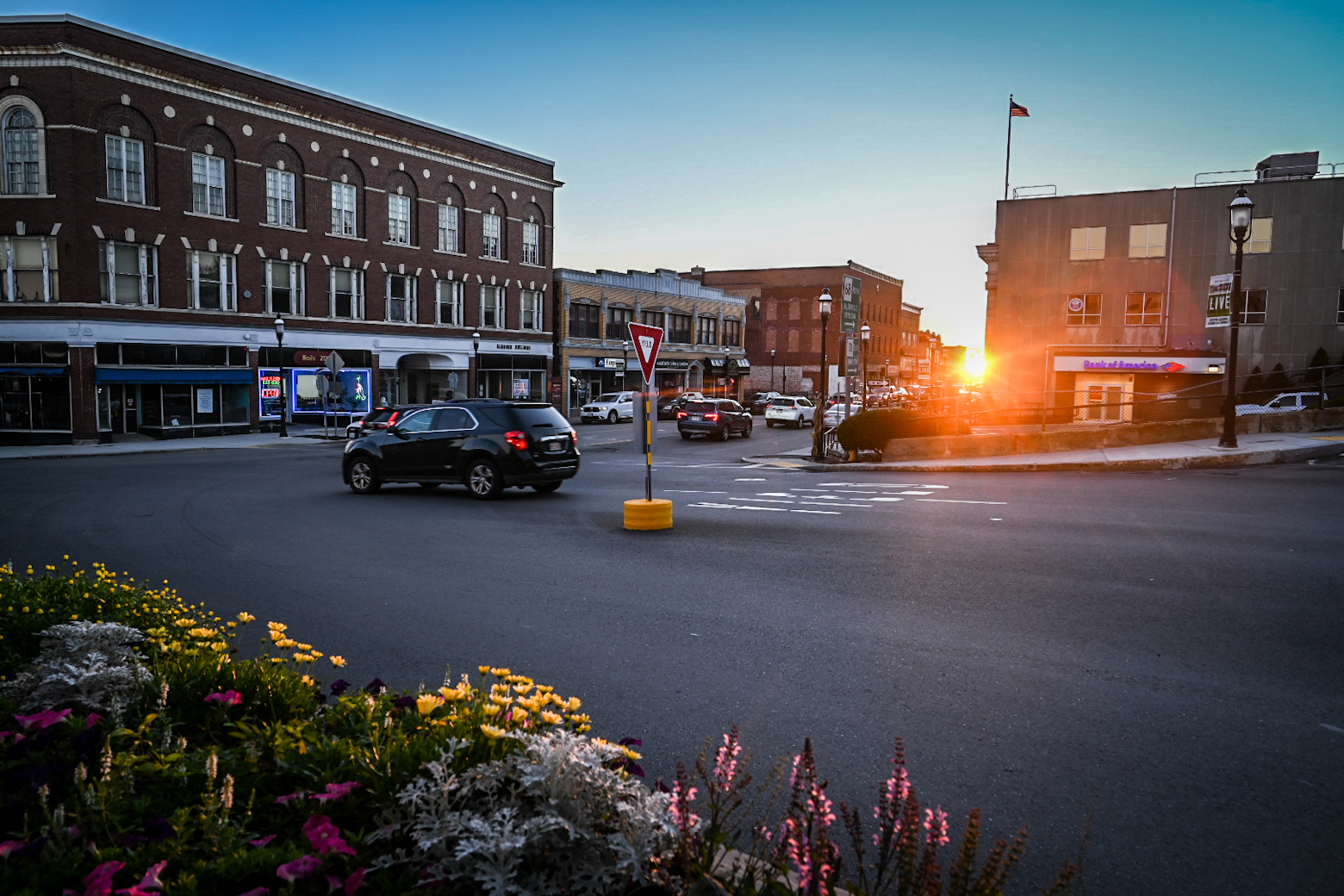
View of the West Gardner Square Historic District in 2021.

== Demographics ==
Historical population
| Year | Pop. | ±% |
|---|---|---|
| 1790 | 531 | — |
| 1800 | 667 | +25.6% |
| 1810 | 815 | +22.2% |
| 1820 | 911 | +11.8% |
| 1830 | 1,023 | +12.3% |
| 1840 | 1,260 | +23.2% |
| 1850 | 1,533 | +21.7% |
| 1860 | 2,646 | +72.6% |
| 1870 | 3,333 | +26.0% |
| 1880 | 4,988 | +49.7% |
| 1890 | 3,424 | −31.4% |
| 1900 | 10,813 | +215.8% |
| 1910 | 14,699 | +35.9% |
| 1920 | 16,971 | +15.5% |
| 1930 | 19,399 | +14.3% |
| 1940 | 20,206 | +4.2% |
| 1950 | 19,581 | −3.1% |
| 1960 | 19,038 | −2.8% |
| 1970 | 19,748 | +3.7% |
| 1980 | 17,900 | −9.4% |
| 1990 | 20,125 | +12.4% |
| 2000 | 20,770 | +3.2% |
| 2010 | 20,228 | −2.6% |
| 2020 | 21,287 | +5.2% |
| 2024* | 21,381 | +0.4% |
* = population estimate. Source: U.S. Decennial Census

=== 2020 census ===
As of the 2020 census, Gardner had a population of 21,287. The median age was 42.1 years. 18.5% of residents were under the age of 18 and 18.3% of residents were 65 years of age or older. For every 100 females there were 107.5 males, and for every 100 females age 18 and over there were 107.4 males age 18 and over.

91.5% of residents lived in urban areas, while 8.5% lived in rural areas.

There were 8,720 households in Gardner, of which 24.7% had children under the age of 18 living in them. Of all households, 37.0% were married-couple households, 22.8% were households with a male householder and no spouse or partner present, and 30.1% were households with a female householder and no spouse or partner present. About 33.3% of all households were made up of individuals and 13.2% had someone living alone who was 65 years of age or older.

There were 9,411 housing units, of which 7.3% were vacant. The homeowner vacancy rate was 1.4% and the rental vacancy rate was 6.8%.

Racial composition as of the 2020 census
| Race | Number | Percent |
|---|---|---|
| White | 17,317 | 81.4% |
| Black or African American | 778 | 3.7% |
| American Indian and Alaska Native | 60 | 0.3% |
| Asian | 401 | 1.9% |
| Native Hawaiian and Other Pacific Islander | 8 | 0.0% |
| Some other race | 882 | 4.1% |
| Two or more races | 1,841 | 8.6% |
| Hispanic or Latino (of any race) | 2,344 | 11.0% |

=== 2018 population density estimate ===
The population density was 931.0 people per square mile in 2018.

=== 2000 census ===
As of the United States Census of 2000, there were 20,770 people, 8,282 households, and 5,085 families residing in Gardner. There were 8,838 housing units at an average density of 398.3 per square mile (153.8/km^{2}). The racial makeup of the city was 93.13% White, 2.29% African American, 0.34% Native American, 1.37% Asian, 0.08% Pacific Islander, 1.22% from other races, and 1.58% from two or more races. Hispanic or Latino of any race were 4.08% of the population, while 19.6% were of French Canadian, 17.6% French, 12.7% Irish, 6.7% English, 6.3% Polish and 6.2% Italian ancestry.

There were 8,282 households, out of which 30.3% had children under the age of 18 living with them, 44.4% were married couples living together, 12.7% had a female householder with no husband present, and 38.6% were non-families. Of all households, 32.4% were made up of individuals, and 13.5% had someone living alone who was 65 years of age or older. The average household size was 2.35 and the average family size was 2.97.

In the city, the population was spread out, with 23.7% under the age of 18, 7.7% from 18 to 24, 31.8% from 25 to 44, 20.7% from 45 to 64, and 16.1% who were 65 years of age or older. The median age was 38 years. For every 100 females, there were 105.1 males. For every 100 females age 18 and over, there were 103.7 males.

The median income for a household in the city was $37,334, and the median income for a family was $47,164. Males had a median income of $35,804 versus $26,913 for females. The per capita income for the city was $18,624. About 7.0% of families and 9.6% of the population were below the poverty line, including 12.8% of those under age 18 and 11.7% of those age 65 or over.

== Economy ==
Throughout its history, Gardner has been known for its furniture industry, earning its nickname as "The Chair City". While the location has undergone deindustrialization in recent decades, a handful of manufacturers remain in Gardner and its neighboring towns, including Standard Chair of Gardner and the Saloom Furniture Company. A new company, Wood You Build It launched its own Gardner manufacturing location in 2023. It started in a basement workshop in 2012. The city is also home to a multinational paper and packaging manufacturer, Seaman Paper.

== Arts and culture ==
The Gardner Public Library opened in 1885. The original building is now a museum of the city's history. In 2008, Gardner spent 1.84% ($734,164) of its budget on the public library.

== Government ==
State government
| State Representative(s): | Jonathan Zlotnik (D) |
| State Senator(s): | Peter Durant (R) |
| Governor's Councilor(s): | Paul DePalo (D) |
Federal government
| U.S. Representative(s): | Lori Trahan (D-3rd District), |
| U.S. Senators: | Elizabeth Warren (D), Ed Markey (D) |

== Education ==
There is one elementary school in Gardner, Gardner Elementary School it serves grades K–4. Gardner Middle School serves grades 5–7. Gardner High School is the city's high school and serves grades 8–12. There is also Gardner Academy (alternative school)

== Media ==
Gardner was a filming location for the 1992 movie School Ties, and the television series Castle Rock.

== Infrastructure ==
=== Transportation ===
Public transportation for Gardner is largely supplied by the Montachusett Regional Transit Authority (MART). It operates local fixed-route bus services, shuttle services, as well as para-transit services within the Montachusett Region.

Beginning in 1871, the Boston, Barre and Gardner Railroad provided rail service to the town. Gardner Station was the terminus of the Fitchburg Line for the MBTA from 1980 to 1986, but was cut back to Fitchburg at the beginning of 1987. MART began weekday van service from Gardner to the new Wachusett terminus of the Fitchburg line in 2016.

== Notable people ==
- Larry Alexander, politician
- Samantha Arsenault, Olympic swimmer
- Red Blanchard, radio personality
- Harrison Cady, illustrator
- Thomas J. Campbell, football player
- Jacques Cesaire, football player
- Karl Dean, politician
- Oliver Drake, baseball player
- Walt Dubzinski, football player
- Alan D. Eames, writer
- Mark Gearan, lawyer
- Dawn George, boxer
- Levi H. Greenwood, politician
- Matt Griffin, college football coach
- Shawn Halloran, football player
- Edward Hill, painter
- Vincent Ialenti, anthropologist
- Justus K. Jillson, educator
- Abner Kneeland, theologian
- Nicholas LaRoche, figure skater
- Omer Léger, politician
- Hadassah Lieberman, wife of Joe Lieberman
- Increase Sumner Lincoln, minister
- Ollie Manninen, Olympic long-distance runner
- Bob Menne, golfer
- Christine Mitchell, filmmaker
- Frank Morze, football player
- Mark Pieloch, business executive
- Barbara Richardson, wife of Bill Richardson
- Peter Roberts, inventor
- Sybil Laura Smith, home economist
- Lucy Stone, abolitionist
- Asa Stratton, baseball player
- George Clinton Sweeney, judge
- Richard Taylor, cross-country skier
- Charles H. Thomas, baseball executive
- Robert D. Wetmore, politician
- Oshea Wilder, pioneer
- William Wilder, politician
- Jesse P. Wolcott, politician
- Jonathan Zlotnik, politician

== See also ==
- List of mill towns in Massachusetts
