= List of Massachusetts state parks =

Massachusetts State Parks (Hover mouse over pog to popup clickable link)

This list of Massachusetts State Parks contains the state parks and recreation areas in the Commonwealth of Massachusetts managed by the Massachusetts Department of Conservation and Recreation as of 2015.

The Bureau of State Parks and Recreation division of Department of Conservation and Recreation (Massachusetts) (DCR) is responsible for the maintenance and management of over 450,000 acres (1,820 sq km) of privately and state-owned forests and parks, nearly 10% of the Commonwealth's total land mass. Within the lands managed by the Bureau of State Parks and Recreation are some 29 campgrounds, over 2,000 miles (3,200 km) of trails, 87 beaches, 37 swimming, wading, and spray pools, 62 playgrounds, 55 ballfields, and 145 miles (233 km) of paved bike and rail trails.

DCR's Bureau of Urban Parks and Recreation manages the Metropolitan Park System of Greater Boston, the components of which are included in this list.

== State parks ==
Name	County	Area		Estab- lished	River / lake / other	Image	Remarks
Name	County	acres	ha	Estab- lished	River / lake / other	Image	Remarks
Ames Nowell State Park	Plymouth; 42°7′12.8994″N 70°59′13.632″W	612 acres	248 ha	1959	Cleveland Pond		The park is primarily used for boating and fishing.
Ashland State Park	Middlesex; 42°14′30″N 71°27′58″W	472 acres	191 ha	1947	Ashland Reservoir		
Bash Bish Falls State Park	Berkshire; 42°06′53″N 73°29′34″W	424 acres	172 ha	1924	Bash Bish Falls		Massachusetts' highest single-drop waterfall lies within the park borders.
Blackstone River and Canal Heritage State Park	Worcester; 42°05′40″N 71°37′23″W	1,066 acres	431 ha	1981	Blackstone River		The park is the midpoint of the Blackstone River Valley National Heritage Corridor of the National Park System.
Borderland State Park	Bristol, Norfolk; 42°4′3″N 71°9′13″W	1,843 acres	746 ha	1971			On National Register of Historic Places
Boston Harbor Islands State Park	Norfolk, Plymouth, Suffolk; 42°19′11.6″N 70°55′45.6″W	404 acres	163 ha	1996	Boston Harbor		
Bradley Palmer State Park	Essex; 42°38′0″N 70°53′43″W	736 acres	298 ha	1944	Ipswich River		The park that features rolling meadows, lush evergreens and old carriage roads lined with rhododendrons.
Brook Farm Historic Site	Suffolk; 42°17′29″N 71°10′26.7″W	141 acres	57 ha	1988			
C. M. Gardner State Park	Hampden; 42°16′31″N 72°52′14.5″W	85 acres	34 ha	1959	Westfield River		
Callahan State Park	Middlesex; 42°20′35″N 71°26′55″W	958 acres	388 ha	1970			
Camp Nihan Environmental Education Camp	Essex; 42°29′32.6″N 71°1′11.4″W	65 acres	26 ha	1929	Saugus River		Part of Breakheart Reservation
Castle Island	Suffolk; 42°20′15″N 71°0′38″W	22 acres	8.9 ha		Boston Harbor		The present fort, built between 1834 and 1851, is the eighth generation of forts and it is one of the oldest fortified sites in British North America.
Chicopee Memorial State Park	Hampden; 42°10′45″N 72°32′13″W	562 acres	227 ha	1893	Cooley Brook Reservoir		The park includes two 25-acre (10 ha) ponds.
Clarksburg State Park	Berkshire; 42°44′5″N 73°4′35″W	3,629 acres	1,469 ha		Mauserts Pond		Adjoins 3,011 acre Clarksburg State Forest
Cochituate State Park	Middlesex; 42°18′45″N 71°22′27″W	872 acres	353 ha		Lake Cochituate		
Connecticut River Greenway State Park	Franklin, Hampden, Hampshire; 42°36′27″N 72°32′30″W	1,048 acres	424 ha	1986	Connecticut River		Multiple state land holdings in the Pioneer Valley of Western Massachusetts
Constitution Beach	Suffolk; 42°23′5.5″N 71°0′36.2″W	82 acres	33 ha	1952	Boston Harbor		
Demarest Lloyd State Park	Bristol; 41°31′44″N 70°59′0″W	200 acres	81 ha	1953	Buzzards Bay		
Dighton Rock State Park	Bristol; 41°48′46″N 71°6′23″W	98 acres	40 ha	1955	Taunton River		Dighton Rock is an 11-foot (3.4 m) high glacial erratic covered with petroglyphs and has since been moved to a museum at the park.
Dunn State Park	Worcester; 42°34′48″N 71°58′12″W	132 acres	53 ha	1915	Dunn Pond		
Ellisville Harbor State Park	Plymouth; 41°50′34″N 70°32′13″W	97 acres	39 ha	1991	Cape Cod Bay		Walking trails overlooking a tidal marsh, sandy/rocky beach at trail end
Fall River Heritage State Park	Bristol; 41°42′20″N 71°9′38″W	14 acres	5.7 ha	1985	Taunton River		
Fort Revere Park	Plymouth; 42°18′17″N 70°54′21″W	6 acres	2.4 ha	1976	Atlantic Ocean		On Telegraph Hill in Hull, Massachusetts. Remnants of two seacoast fortifications, water tower with observation deck, military history museum and picnic facilities
Francis D. Martini Memorial Shell Park and Moynihan Recreation Area	Suffolk; 42°14′36″N 71°7′37″W	5.6 acres	2.3 ha		Neponset River		Outdoor theatre and play fields
Great Brook Farm State Park	Middlesex; 42°33′21″N 71°21′12″W	909 acres	368 ha	1967	Meadow Pond		
Greycourt State Park	Essex; 42°43′46″N 71°10′51″W	24 acres	9.7 ha	2001			The park is built atop the restored ruins of the Charles H. Tenney estate.
Halibut Point State Park	Essex; 42°41′22″N 70°37′59″W	55 acres	22 ha	1981			Features a former granite quarry and 60-foot (18 m) tower with coastal views
Hampton Ponds State Park	Hampden; 42°10′45″N 72°41′22″W	47 acres	19 ha		Pequot Pond		
Holyoke Heritage State Park	Hampden; 42°12′18″N 72°36′26″W	7 acres	2.8 ha	1986			The park features include a visitor center with exhibits about paper manufacturing and Holyoke's industrial and cultural history.
Hopkinton State Park	Middlesex; 42°14′57″N 71°31′32″W	1,245 acres	504 ha	1947	Hopkinton Reservoir		The park features a bathing pond for swimming that is physically separated from the reservoir, where nonmotorized boating is permitted
Lake Dennison Recreation Area	Worcester	121 acres	49 ha		Lake Dennison		The park is an extension of Otter River State Forest
Lake Wyola State Park	Franklin	42 acres	17 ha	1997	Lake Wyola		
Lawrence Heritage State Park	Essex	50 acres	20 ha	1980			
Lowell Heritage State Park	Middlesex	60 acres	24 ha	1975	Merrimack River		Precursor to Lowell National Historical Park; preserves the city's seminal role in the American Industrial Revolution
Lynn Heritage State Park	Essex	4 acres	1.6 ha	1986			
Massasoit State Park	Bristol	1,207 acres	488 ha		Lake Rico, Furnace Pond, King's Pond, Middle Pond, Little Bearhole Pond, and Big Bearhole Pond		
Maudslay State Park	Essex	483 acres	195 ha	1985	Merrimack River		
Moore State Park	Worcester	737 acres	298 ha		Eames Pond		
Mount Holyoke Range State Park	Hampshire	3,000 acres	1,200 ha	1940			
Natural Bridge State Park	Berkshire	44 acres	18 ha	1985	Hudson Brook		It contains the only natural white marble arch/bridge in North America. The natural bridge spanning Hudson Brook, was formed by glacial melt about 11,000 BC, from 550 million year old bedrock.
Nickerson State Park	Barnstable	1,967 acres	796 ha	1934	Cliff Pond		
Pearl Hill State Park	Middlesex	1,000 acres	400 ha		Park Hill Brook		
Pilgrim Memorial State Park	Plymouth	6 acres	2.4 ha	1920			Site of Plymouth Rock
Quinsigamond State Park	Worcester	38 acres	15 ha				
Robinson State Park	Hampden	1,025 acres	415 ha	1934	Westfield River		
Roxbury Heritage State Park	Suffolk	3 acres	1.2 ha	1992			The 1750 Dillaway-Thomas House and a small park
Rutland State Park	Worcester	284 acres	115 ha		Whitehall Pond		Swimming, picnicking and boating.
J.A. Skinner State Park	Hampshire	843 acres	341 ha	1940	Connecticut River		
South Cape Beach State Park	Barnstable	460 acres	190 ha				A component of the Waquoit Bay National Estuarine Research Reserve with a one-mile (1.6 km) stretch of beach.
Southwest Corridor Park	Suffolk	221 acres	89 ha	1987			Greenway of 4.7 miles (7.6 km) that runs South End, Back Bay, Roxbury and Jamaica Plain neighborhoods
Squantum Point Park	Norfolk	46 acres	19 ha	2001			
Streeter Point Recreation Area	Worcester	1 acre	0.40 ha		East Brimfield Reservoir		Fishing, swimming, picnicking
Wahconah Falls State Park	Berkshire	48 acres	19 ha		Wahconah Falls Brook		
Watson Pond State Park	Bristol	163 acres	66 ha				
Webb Memorial State Park	Norfolk	59 acres	24 ha	1980	Hingham Bay		
Wells State Park	Worcester	1,445 acres	585 ha	1968	Walker Pond		
Western Gateway Heritage State Park	Berkshire	8 acres	3.2 ha	1986			
Whitehall State Park	Middlesex	837 acres	339 ha	1947	Whitehall Reservoir		
Wompatuck State Park	Plymouth	3,579 acres	1,448 ha	1967	Aaron River Reservoir		

== Closed state parks ==
Name	County	Area		Estab- lished	River / lake / other	Image	Remarks
Name	County	acres	ha	Estab- lished	River / lake / other	Image	Remarks
Gardner Heritage State Park	Worcester	0 acres	0 ha	1985			Restored 19th century fire station with exhibits; closed since 2002
Lake Lorraine State Park	Hampden	3 acres	1.2 ha		Lake Lorraine		Closed to the public

== State reservations ==
Name	County	Area		Estab- lished	River / lake / other	Image	Remarks
Name	County	acres	ha	Estab- lished	River / lake / other	Image	Remarks
Alewife Brook Reservation	Middlesex; 42°23′48″N 71°8′38″W	136 acres	55 ha	1900	Little Pond, Little River, Alewife Brook		A major portion of the Alewife Reservation is designated wetland. The Reservation is located at the end of the Minuteman Bike Path in Arlington
Beaver Brook Reservation	Middlesex; 42°23′26″N 71°11′52″W	303 acres	123 ha	1893			The park includes a cascading waterfall and a wading pool.
Belle Isle Marsh Reservation	Suffolk; 42°23′21″N 70°59′21″W	188 acres	76 ha	1978	Belle Isle Marsh		The reservation includes landscaped pathways, benches, and an observation tower. A portion of the Boston Harborwalk runs through the reservation.
Blue Hills Reservation	Norfolk; 42°12′40″N 71°7′40″W	6,165 acres	2,495 ha	1893	Houghton's Pond, Ponkapoag Pond		The reservation has the distinction of being the largest conservation land within a major metropolitan area.
Breakheart Reservation	Essex, Middlesex; 42°29′21″N 71°2′23″W	652 acres	264 ha	1934	Silver Lake, Pearce Lake, Saugus River		The reservation is hardwood forest principally used for birding, fishing and hiking.
Bristol Blake State Reservation	Norfolk; 42°6′28.6″N 71°19′5″W	140 acres	57 ha	1959	Kingfisher Pond, Stony Brook Pond, Teal Marsh		Adjacent to Stony Brook Wildlife Sanctuary
Charles River Reservation	Suffolk, Middlesex; 42°21′20″N 71°6′56″W	863 acres	349 ha	1910	Charles River		Includes Charles River Dam, Charles River Basin and Esplanade, John F. Kennedy Park, and Teddy Ebersol's Red Sox Fields. Covers Charles River below Watertown Dam; see also Upper Charles River Reservation
Chestnut Hill Reservation	Suffolk; 42°20′7″N 71°9′29″W	1 acre	0.40 ha	1870	Chestnut Hill Reservoir		The Chestnut Hill Reservoir Historic District is considered a nineteenth-century masterpiece of engineering, urban planning and landscape design.
Cutler Park Reservation	Norfolk; 42°16′16″N 71°11′45″W	739 acres	299 ha	1962	Charles River		It contains the largest remaining fresh water marsh on the middle Charles, and includes a boardwalk through a cattail marsh out onto an island.
Dorchester Shores Reservation	Suffolk; 42°17′50″N 71°2′44″W	44 acres	18 ha	1962	Neponset River		The reservation comprises two beaches and a park.
Elm Bank Reservation	Norfolk; 42°16′34″N 71°18′9″W	175 acres	71 ha	1996	Charles River		Benjamin Pierce Cheney's property, now run by Massachusetts Horticultural Society
Fort Phoenix State Reservation	Bristol; 41°37′27″N 70°53′56″W	1 acre	0.40 ha		Atlantic Ocean		Revolutionary War fort; 1/2 mile of Buzzards Bay beachfront
Hammond Pond Reservation	Middlesex; 42°19′30″N 71°10′36″W	59 acres	24 ha	1968			
Hemlock Gorge Reservation	Middlesex; 42°18′52″N 71°13′35″W	16 acres	6.5 ha	1895	Charles River		
Horseneck Beach State Reservation	Bristol; 41°30′28″N 71°2′55″W	815 acres	330 ha	1956			Popular for its two-mile (3 km) long sandy beach on the shore of Buzzards Bay. Also camping, fishing and a salt marsh.
Lynn Shore Reservation	Essex	22 acres	8.9 ha				
Jug End State Reservation and Wildlife Management Area	Berkshire	1,191 acres	482 ha	1994			
Middlesex Fells Reservation	Middlesex	2,283 acres	924 ha	1893	Bellevue and Spot Ponds		
Mount Everett State Reservation	Berkshire	2,492 acres	1,008 ha	1908	Guilder Pond		
Mount Greylock State Reservation	Berkshire	12,455 acres	5,040 ha	1898			
Mount Sugarloaf State Reservation	Franklin	533 acres	216 ha	1907			
Mount Tom State Reservation	Hampden	1,967 acres	796 ha	1902			
Myles Standish Monument State Reservation	Plymouth	30 acres	12 ha	1920			A 120-foot (37 m) tower with 125 steps that overlooks Plymouth Harbor and Duxbury Beach.
Mystic River Reservation	Middlesex	359 acres	145 ha	1893	Mystic Lakes; Mystic River		
Nahant Beach Reservation	Essex	67 acres	27 ha		Atlantic Ocean		
Nantasket Beach Reservation	Plymouth	39 acres	16 ha				
Nasketucket Bay State Reservation	Plymouth	210 acres	85 ha	1999			
Neponset River Reservation	Suffolk	1,880 acres	760 ha				
Pope John Paul II Park Reservation	Suffolk	66 acres	27 ha	2001	Neponset River Estuary		Reclaimed former landfill and commercial area
Purgatory Chasm State Reservation	Worcester	100 acres	40 ha	1919			The Chasm was created when glacial meltwater from a burst ice dam ripped out blocks of bedrock at the end of the last Ice Age (14,000 years ago).
Quincy Quarries Reservation	Norfolk	22 acres	8.9 ha	1985			
Quincy Shores Reservation	Norfolk	87 acres	35 ha	1899			
Revere Beach Reservation	Suffolk	84 acres	34 ha	1896			
Rumney Marsh Reservation	Essex, Suffolk	815 acres	330 ha	1992	Saugus River; Pines River		
Salisbury Beach State Reservation	Essex	355 acres	144 ha	1931			The park's main feature is its 3.8-mile (6.1 km)-long beach, one of the most popular in the Commonwealth.
Sandy Point State Reservation	Essex	134 acres	54 ha				
Scusset Beach State Reservation	Barnstable	459 acres	186 ha	1957			On Cape Cod Bay at the east end of the Cape Cod Canal, a popular swimming and camping area.
Stony Brook Reservation	Suffolk	616 acres	249 ha	1894	Turtle Pond		
Upper Charles River Reservation	Middlesex, Norfolk, Suffolk	863 acres	349 ha		Charles River		Covers Charles River between Watertown Dam and Riverdale Park, West Roxbury; see also Charles River Reservation
Wachusett Mountain State Reservation	Worcester	2,288 acres	926 ha	1899			
Walden Pond State Reservation	Middlesex	335 acres	136 ha	1922	Walden Pond		
Weymouth Back River Reservation	Norfolk	35 acres	14 ha				Site of Stodder's Neck and Abigail Adams Park
Wilson Mountain Reservation	Norfolk	215 acres	87 ha	1995			
Winthrop Shore Reservation	Suffolk	18 acres	7.3 ha	1900	Atlantic Ocean		

== State forests ==
Name	County	Area		Estab- lished	River / lake / other	Image	Remarks
Name	County	acres	ha	Estab- lished	River / lake / other	Image	Remarks
Beartown State Forest	Berkshire; 42°14′00″N 73°16′28″W	120 acres	49 ha	1921	Benedict Pond		Approximately 7.5 miles (12.1 km) of the Appalachian Trail travels through the forest.
Berkley State Forest	Bristol	6 acres	2.4 ha				
Brimfield State Forest	Hampden; 42°6′0″N 72°14′56″W	3,523 acres	1,426 ha	1924	Dean Pond		
Chester-Blandford State Forest	Hampden; 42°14′58″N 72°56′58″W	2,776 acres	1,123 ha	1924			
D.A.R. State Forest	Hampshire; 42°27′25″N 72°47′50″W	1,728 acres	699 ha	1929	Upper and Lower Highland Lake		
Douglas State Forest	Worcester; 42°3′30″N 71°47′13″W	5,525 acres	2,236 ha	1934	Wallum Lake		Features include a rare Atlantic White Cedar swamp and 7.8 miles (12.6 km) of the Midstate Trail
Erving State Forest	Franklin; 42°37′21″N 72°22′41″W	2,422 acres	980 ha	1920	Millers River		The 110-mile (180 km) Metacomet-Monadnock Trail passes through a western parcel of the state forest.
F. Gilbert Hills State Forest	Norfolk; 42°3′28″N 71°17′0″W	1,030 acres	420 ha				
Federated Women's Club State Forest	Worcester; 42°29′27″N 72°15′15″W	970 acres	390 ha	1933	Fever Brook		
Freetown-Fall River State Forest	Bristol; 41°45′28″N 71°3′48″W	5,217 acres	2,111 ha	1930			The park includes Profile Rock, a granite outcropping which local Native Americans believe to be the image of Chief Massasoit. Also in the forest is a 227-acre (92 ha) Wampanoag reservation
Georgetown-Rowley State Forest	Essex; 42°42′5″N 70°58′26″W	1,041 acres	421 ha				
Granville State Forest	Hampden; 42°3′35″N 72°58′17″W	2,432 acres	984 ha	1921	Hubbard River		
Harold Parker State Forest	Essex; 42°37′33″N 71°4′54″W	3,320 acres	1,340 ha	1916	Stearns Pond		
Kenneth Dubuque Memorial State Forest	Franklin	7,405 acres	2,997 ha	1997	Hallockville Pond, Crooked Pond		
Leominster State Forest	Worcester	4,246 acres	1,718 ha	1922			The Midstate Trail runs through the western edge of the forest.
Lowell-Dracut-Tyngsboro State Forest	Middlesex	1,109 acres	449 ha	1941			
Manuel F. Correllus State Forest	Dukes	5,215 acres	2,110 ha	1908	Little Pond		In the interior of Martha's Vineyard, the park is the focus of one of the largest environmental restoration projects in the country.
Mohawk Trail State Forest	Franklin	7,758 acres	3,140 ha	1921			Includes Cold River Virgin Forest, National Natural Landmark
Monroe State Forest	Franklin	3,750 acres	1,520 ha	1924	Dunbar Brook		
Mount Grace State Forest	Franklin	1,578 acres	639 ha	1920	Mount Grace		
Mount Washington State Forest	Berkshire	4,619 acres	1,869 ha	1958			
Myles Standish State Forest	Plymouth	12,029 acres	4,868 ha	1916			Pitch pine and scrub oak forest with sixteen ponds for fishing, canoeing, swimming. Camping on four of the ponds, bicycle trails, equestrian trails, and horse camping.
October Mountain State Forest	Berkshire	16,460 acres	6,660 ha	1915			
Otter River State Forest	Worcester	1,022 acres	414 ha	1915	Otter River, Millers River		
Pittsfield State Forest	Berkshire	10,601 acres	4,290 ha				
Sandisfield State Forest	Berkshire	4,190 acres	1,700 ha		York Lake		
Savoy Mountain State Forest	Berkshire	10,457 acres	4,232 ha	1918			
Shawme-Crowell State Forest	Barnstable	624 acres	253 ha				Forested 285 site campground
Spencer State Forest	Worcester	903 acres	365 ha	1922	Howe Pond		
Tolland State Forest	Berkshire	4,415 acres	1,787 ha	1925	Otis Reservoir		
Upton State Forest	Worcester	2,790 acres	1,130 ha	1915			Has Civilian Conservation Corps structures
Wendell State Forest	Franklin	7,566 acres	3,062 ha	1921	Millers River, Quabbin Reservoir		
Willard Brook State Forest	Middlesex	2,929 acres	1,185 ha	1930			
Willowdale State Forest	Essex	2,491 acres	1,008 ha		Hood Pond		
Windsor State Forest	Berkshire	1,824 acres	738 ha	1925	Westfield River		

== Other areas ==
Name	County	Area		Estab- lished	River / lake / other	Image	Remarks
Name	County	acres	ha	Estab- lished	River / lake / other	Image	Remarks
Quabbin Reservoir	Hampshire	39 sq mi	100 km^{2}	1938			
Sudbury Reservoir	Middlesex; Worcester	4,943 acres	2,000 ha	1898	Sudbury Reservoir		
Wachusett Reservoir	Worcester	4,135 acres	1,673 ha	1908	Nashua River; Quinapoxet River		
Waquoit Bay National Estuarine Research Reserve	Barnstable	110 acres	45 ha	1987	Waquoit Bay; Quashnet River; Childs River; ponds		
Ware River Watershed Area	Worcester	23,000 acres	9,300 ha				

== State trails ==
Name	Towns	County	Length		Estab- lished	Image	Remarks
Name	Towns	County	mi	km	Estab- lished	Image	Remarks
Ashuwillticook Rail Trail	Cheshire, Lanesborough, Adams	Berkshire	11 mi	18 km	2001		Conversion of rail corridor dating from 1845
Canalside Rail Trail	Deerfield, Montague	Franklin	3.7 mi	6.0 km	2008		Trail along the Connecticut River
Cape Cod Rail Trail	Dennis, Harwich, Brewster, Orleans, Eastham, Wellfleet	Barnstable	25.5 mi	41.0 km	1976		22-mile trail on Cape Cod
Lower Neponset River Trail	City of Boston	Suffolk	2.4 mi	3.9 km	2010		Runs along the Neponset River in Dorchester
Mahican-Mohawk Trail		Berkshire, Franklin	30 mi	48 km			In development
Mass Central Rail Trail—Wayside	Waltham, Weston, Wayland, Sudbury, Marlborough, Hudson, Stow, Bolton, Berlin	Middlesex, Worcester	23 mi	37 km	2010		In development, sections in Waltham, Wayland, Weston, Sudbury, and Hudson are complete.
Nashua River Rail Trail	Ayer, Groton, Pepperell, Dunstable	Middlesex	12.5 mi	20.1 km	2002		Trail along the Nashua River
Norwottuck Rail Trail	Northampton, Hadley, Amherst, Belchertown	Hampshire	11 mi	18 km	1992		Part of the Mass Central Rail Trail
Southern New England Trunkline Trail	Douglas, Uxbridge, Millville, Blackstone, Bellingham, Franklin	Norfolk, Worcester	22 mi	35 km	1984		22-mile trail from Franklin State Forest to Douglas State Forest

== Other trails ==
Name	Towns	County	Length		Estab- lished	Image	Remarks
Name	Towns	County	mi	km	Estab- lished	Image	Remarks
Appalachian Trail	Great Barrington, Dalton, Cheshire, North Adams, Williamstown	Berkshire	90 mi	140 km	1923		Part of 2200-mile East Coast foot trail; maintained by the Berkshire Chapter of the Appalachian Mountain Club

== See also ==
- List of National Natural Landmarks in Massachusetts
- List of Massachusetts state forests
