= List of Massachusetts state forests =

Massachusetts, with forests covering 3,060,000 acres (12,400 km^{2}) (59%) of its land area, administers more than 500,000 acres (2,000 km^{2}) of state forest, wildlife and watershed land under the cabinet level Executive Office of Energy and Environmental Affairs. Lands are managed by Department of Conservation and Recreation, Division of State Parks and Recreation (285,000 acres (1,150 km^{2})), Division of Fisheries and Wildlife (MassWildlife) (140,000 acres (570 km^{2})), and the Division of Water Supply Protection's Office of Watershed Management (104,000 acres (420 km^{2})).

== Current state forests ==
Name	Location (of main entrance)	Town(s)	Size	Image
Ashburnham State Forest	Ashburnham	Ashburnham; 42°41′20″N 71°54′39″W	2,844 acres (1,151 ha)	
Arthur Wharton Swann State Forest		Great Barrington and Monterey; 42°12′04″N 73°14′20″W	850 acres (340 ha)	
Barnstable State Forest	Barnstable	Barnstable; 41°41′28″N 70°20′35″W	54 acres (22 ha)	
Beartown State Forest	Monterey	Monterey, Great Barrington, Lee, Otis, Stockbridge and Tyringham; 42°12′09″N 73°17′20″W	11,204 acres (4,534 ha)	
Becket State Forest	Becket	Becket; 42°16′06″N 73°01′45″W	1,311 acres (531 ha)	
Berkley State Forest	Berkley	Berkley; 41°49′32″N 71°04′22″W	5.9 acres (2.4 ha)	
Billerica State Forest	Billerica	Billerica; 42°34′05″N 71°17′53″W	370 acres (150 ha)	
Boxford State Forest	Boxford	Boxford, Middleton, and North Andover; 42°38′55″N 71°01′02″W	1,045 acres (423 ha)	
Bridgewater State Forest	Bridgewater	Bridgewater; 41°59′01″N 70°57′02″W	58.5 acres (23.7 ha)	
Brimfield State Forest	Brimfield	Brimfield, Monson and Wales; 42°06′01″N 72°14′02″W	4,941 acres (2,000 ha)	
Bryant Mountain State Forest	Cummington	Cummington; 42°29′11″N 72°58′22″W	636 acres (257 ha)	
Buckland State Forest	Buckland	Buckland; 42°34′39″N 72°45′17″W	93 acres (38 ha)	
Cadwell Memorial State Forest	Pelham	Pelham and Belchertown; 42°21′46″N 72°26′22″W	1,203 acres (487 ha)	
Carlisle State Forest	Carlisle	Carlisle; 42°32′27″N 71°22′54″W	23 acres (9.3 ha)	
Catamount State Forest	Colrain	Colrain and Charlemont; 42°39′08″N 72°45′21″W	1,474 acres (597 ha)	
Chester-Blandford State Forest	Chester	Chester and Blandford; 42°15′14″N 72°56′58″W	2,490 acres (1,010 ha)	
Chesterfield Gorge State Forest	Chesterfield	Chesterfield; 42°23′17″N 72°52′54″W	31.4 acres (12.7 ha)	
Clarksburg State Forest	Clarksburg	Clarksburg and North Adams; 42°43′02″N 73°08′59″W	3,668 acres (1,484 ha)	
Conway State Forest	Conway	Conway and Williamsburg; 42°28′46″N 72°42′34″W	1,874 acres (758 ha)	
Cookson State Forest		New Marlborough and Sandisfield; 42°03′13″N 73°11′36″W	2,798 acres (1,132 ha)	
D.A.R. State Forest	Goshen	Goshen, Ashfield and Williamsburg; 42°27′46″N 72°47′10″W	2,095 acres (848 ha)	
Dead Branch State Forest	Chesterfield	Chesterfield and Westhampton; 42°21′22″N 72°49′16″W	482 acres (195 ha)	
Douglas State Forest	Douglas	Douglas, Oxford and Webster; 42°01′54″N 71°46′27″W	5,754 acres (2,329 ha)	
East Branch State Forest	Chesterfield	Chesterfield; 42°21′46″N 72°52′09″W	1,232 acres (499 ha)	
East Mountain State Forest	Great Barrington	Great Barrington, New Marlborough and Sheffield; 42°10′38″N 73°19′46″W	1,867 acres (756 ha)	
Erving State Forest	Erving	Erving and Orange; 42°36′55″N 72°22′49″W	2,261 acres (915 ha)	
F. Gilbert Hills State Forest	Foxboro	Foxboro and Wrentham; 42°03′04″N 71°15′58″W	1,040 acres (420 ha)	
Federated Women's Club State Forest	Petersham	Petersham; 42°29′15″N 72°15′17″W	469 acres (190 ha)	
Florida State Forest	Florida	Florida and Clarksburg; 42°42′01″N 73°03′26″W	2,135 acres (864 ha)	
Franklin State Forest	Franklin	Franklin and Wrentham; 42°04′26″N 71°26′13″W	914 acres (370 ha)	
Freetown-Fall River State Forest	Freetown	Freetown, Fall River and Lakeville; 41°46′38″N 71°02′43″W	6,052 acres (2,449 ha)	
Georgetown-Rowley State Forest	Georgetown	Georgetown, Rowley and Boxford; 42°42′11″N 70°58′23″W	993 acres (402 ha)	
Gilbert A. Bliss State Forest	Chesterfield	Chesterfield and Cummington; 42°26′21″N 72°52′00″W	2,341 acres (947 ha)	
Granville State Forest	Granville	Granville and Tolland; 42°03′24″N 72°58′00″W	2,378 acres (962 ha)	
H.O. Cook State Forest	Heath	Heath and Colrain; 42°43′48″N 72°47′21″W	4,465 acres (1,807 ha)	
Harold Parker State Forest	North Andover	North Andover. Andover, Middleton and North Reading; 42°36′59″N 71°04′35″W	3,148 acres (1,274 ha)	
Hubbardston State Forest	Hubbardston	Hubbardston and Phillipston; 42°30′35″N 72°02′42″W	1,369 acres (554 ha)	
Huntington State Forest	Huntington	Huntington, Montgomery and Westhampton; 42°15′24″N 72°50′18″W	885 acres (358 ha)	
J. Harry Rich State Forest	Groton	Groton and Pepperell; 42°38′09″N 71°35′15″W	566.5 acres (229.3 ha)	
Kingston State Forest	Kingston	Kingston; 41°57′30″N 70°44′54″W	161 acres (65 ha)	
Kenneth Dubuque Memorial State Forest	Hawley	Hawley, Buckland, Plainfield and Windsor; 42°33′11″N 72°54′42″W	7,535 acres (3,049 ha)	
Krug Sugarbush State Forest	Chesterfield	Chesterfield; 42°21′41″N 72°49′37″W	92 acres (37 ha)	
Lancaster State Forest	Lancaster	Lancaster; 42°29′37″N 71°41′10″W	91 acres (37 ha)	
Lawton State Forest	Athol	Athol; 42°37′12″N 72°12′49″W	439 acres (178 ha)	
Leominster State Forest	Leominster	Leominster, Fitchburg, Princeton, Sterling and Westminster; 42°30′58″N 71°51′26″W	3,253 acres (1,316 ha)	
Leyden State Forest	Leyden	Leyden; 42°42′49″N 72°38′18″W	60 acres (24 ha)	
Lowell-Dracut-Tyngsboro State Forest	Lowell	Lowell, Dracut and Tyngsborough; 42°39′42″N 71°21′38″W	984 acres (398 ha)	
Ludlow State Forest	Ludlow	Ludlow; 42°10′46″N 72°25′59″W	50 acres (20 ha)	
Manuel F. Correllus State Forest	Edgartown	Edgartown; 41°24′38″N 70°36′14″W	900 acres (360 ha)	
Marlborough-Sudbury State Forest		Marlborough, Hudson, Stow and Sudbury; 42°23′32″N 71°29′22″W	695 acres (281 ha)	
Martha's Vineyard State Forest		Edgartown and West Tisbury; 41°24′00″N 70°38′34″W	3,321 acres (1,344 ha)	
Middlefield State Forest	Middlefield	Middlefield and Peru; 42°22′48″N 73°02′32″W	2,902 acres (1,174 ha)	
Mohawk Trail State Forest	Charlemont	Charlemont, Florida, Hawley and Savoy; 42°38′35″N 72°56′44″W	6,887 acres (2,787 ha)	
Monroe State Forest	Monroe	Monroe, Florida and Rowe; 42°43′13″N 72°59′30″W	3,959 acres (1,602 ha)	
Montague State Forest	Montague	Montague and Wendell; 42°32′48″N 72°29′20″W	1,346 acres (545 ha)	
Mount Grace State Forest	Warwick	Warwick; 42°41′37″N 72°20′29″W	352 acres (142 ha)	
Mount Toby State Forest	Sunderland	Sunderland, Leverett and Montague; 42°30′12″N 72°31′35″W	1,553 acres (628 ha)	
Mount Washington State Forest	Mount Washington	Mount Washington; 42°05′09″N 73°27′54″W	6,348 acres (2,569 ha)	
Myles Standish State Forest	Carver	Carver, Duxbury, Plymouth and Wareham; 41°51′14″N 70°40′47″W	12,819 acres (5,188 ha)	
Nantucket State Forest	Nantucket	Nantucket; 41°15′54″N 70°04′46″W	116 acres (47 ha)	
Natural Bridge State Forest	North Adams	North Adams and Clarksburg; 42°42′33″N 73°05′17″W	33.5 acres (13.6 ha)	
New Salem State Forest	New Salem	New Salem; 42°30′46″N 72°21′02″W	170 acres (69 ha)	
North Brookfield State Forest	North Brookfield	North Brookfield; 42°14′44″N 72°02′18″W	77 acres (31 ha)	
Northfield State Forest	Northfield	Northfield and Erving; 42°39′00″N 72°23′53″W	3,879 acres (1,570 ha)	
Oakham State Forest	Oakham	Oakham and Rutland; 42°19′36″N 72°00′55″W	830 acres (340 ha)	
October Mountain State Forest	Lee	Lee, Becket, Lenox, Pittsfield and Washington; 42°20′41″N 73°11′24″W	15,925 acres (6,445 ha)	
Orange State Forest	Orange	Orange; 42°35′03″N 72°20′46″W	453 acres (183 ha)	
Otis State Forest	Otis	Otis, Becket and Sandisfield; 42°10′39″N 73°07′09″W	6,600 acres (2,700 ha)	
Otter River State Forest	Templeton	Templeton; 42°37′34″N 72°04′45″W	485 acres (196 ha)	
Peru State Forest	Peru	Peru, Middlefield and Worthington; 42°23′18″N 73°01′02″W	2,760 acres (1,120 ha)	
Petersham State Forest	Petersham	Petersham and Athol; 42°31′26″N 72°12′32″W	636 acres (257 ha)	
Pittsfield State Forest	Pittsfield	Pittsfield, Hancock and Lanesborough; 42°30′32″N 73°19′39″W	10,021 acres (4,055 ha)	
Prospect Hill State Forest	Rowley	Rowley; 42°42′14″N 70°53′28″W	98 acres (40 ha)	
Raynham State Forest	Raynham	Raynham; 41°54′55″N 71°00′50″W	17.3 acres (7.0 ha)	
Rehoboth State Forest	Rehoboth	Rehoboth; 41°53′21″N 71°12′35″W	138 acres (56 ha)	
Richmond State Forest	Richmond	Richmond	79 acres (32 ha)	
Rowe State Forest	Rowe	Rowe	134 acres (54 ha)	
Royalston State Forest	Royalston	Royalston; 42°42′48″N 72°13′44″W	1,362 acres (551 ha)	
Sandisfield State Forest	Sandisfield	Sandisfield and New Marlborough; 42°06′52″N 73°10′40″W	6,616 acres (2,677 ha)	
Savoy Mountain State Forest	Savoy	Savoy, Adams, Florida and North Adams; 42°39′10″N 73°03′09″W	10,435 acres (4,223 ha)	
Shawme-Crowell State Forest	Sandwich	Sandwich and Bourne; 41°45′38″N 70°31′26″W	579 acres (234 ha)	
Shelburne State Forest	Shelburne	Shelburne; 42°35′23″N 72°43′21″W	52 acres (21 ha)	
Shutesbury State Forest	Shutesbury	Shutesbury and New Salem; 42°28′23″N 72°22′45″W	270 acres (110 ha)	
South River State Forest	Conway	Conway; 42°33′30″N 72°41′10″W	591 acres (239 ha)	
Spencer State Forest	Spencer	Spencer; 42°12′52″N 72°00′04″W	1,122 acres (454 ha)	
Sutton State Forest	Sutton	Sutton; 42°07′25″N 71°43′18″W	1,085 acres (439 ha)	
Taconic Trail State Forest	Williamstown	Williamstown and Hancock; 42°42′39″N 73°15′22″W	2,197 acres (889 ha)	
Templeton State Forest	Templeton	Templeton; 42°34′39″N 72°05′20″W	291 acres (118 ha)	
Tolland State Forest	Tolland	Tolland, Otis and Blandford; 42°08′38″N 73°02′45″W	6,878 acres (2,783 ha)	
Townsend State Forest	Townsend	Townsend; 42°41′39″N 71°41′51″W	3,903 acres (1,579 ha)	
Upton State Forest	Upton	Upton, Hopedale and Northbridge; 42°12′33″N 71°36′33″W	2,962 acres (1,199 ha)	
Warren H. Manning State Forest	Billerica	Billerica; 42°35′10″N 71°18′11″W	195 acres (79 ha)	
Warwick State Forest	Warwick	Warwick, Northfield, Orange and Royalston; 42°38′36″N 72°22′08″W	11,635 acres (4,709 ha)	
Wendell State Forest	Wendell	Wendell; 42°33′24″N 72°25′48″W	7,297 acres (2,953 ha)	
West Bridgewater State Forest	West Bridgewater	West Bridgewater	217 acres (88 ha)	
West Brookfield State Forest	West Brookfield	West Brookfield; 42°15′50″N 72°08′30″W	140 acres (57 ha)	
Westminster State Forest	Westminster	Westminster, Gardner and Hubbardston; 42°31′06″N 71°56′38″W	372 acres (151 ha)	
Willard Brook State Forest	Ashby	Ashby, Fitchburg, Lunenburg and Townsend; 42°40′19″N 71°46′36″W	2,475 acres (1,002 ha)	
Willowdale State Forest	Ipswich	Ipswich, Boxford, Rowley and Topsfield; 42°41′01″N 70°53′57″W	2,325 acres (941 ha)	
Winchendon State Forest	Winchendon	Winchendon; 42°37′21″N 72°01′42″W	712 acres (288 ha)	
Windsor State Forest	Windsor	Windsor and Savoy	1,845 acres (747 ha)	
Worthington State Forest	Worthington	Worthington	219 acres (89 ha)	
Wrentham State Forest	Wrentham	Wrentham and Plainville	927 acres (375 ha)	

== See also ==
- List of national forests of the United States
- List of Massachusetts state parks
