= Hannah Cope Plimpton =

American educator, relief worker

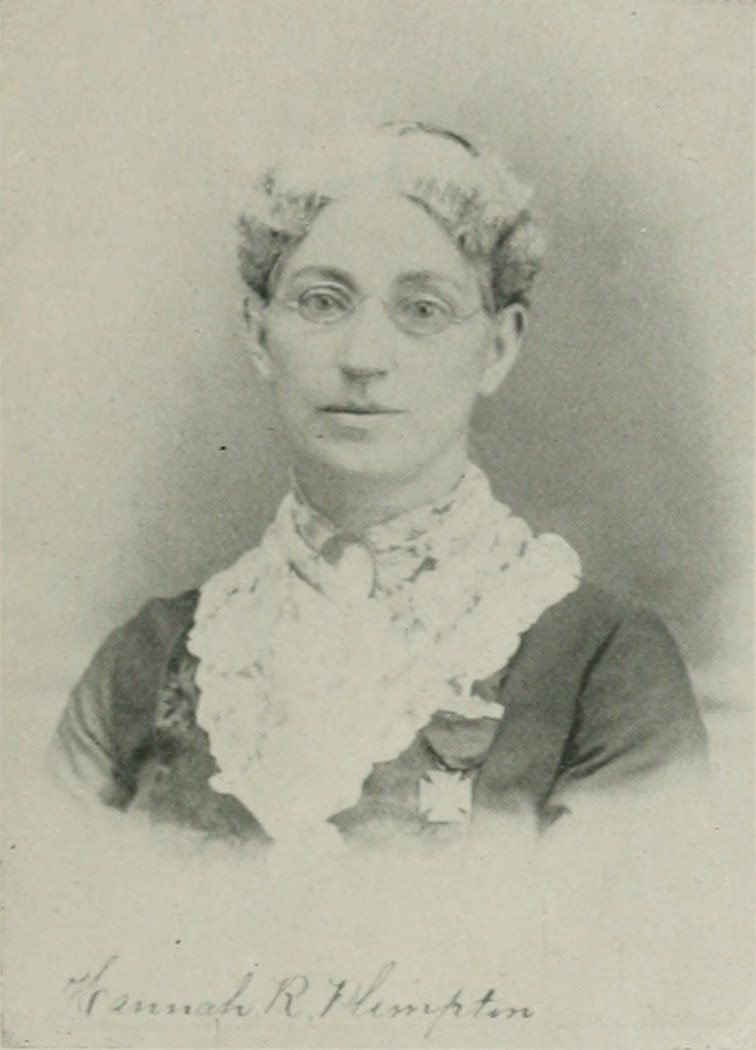
- Born: Hannah Rebecca Cope; June 19, 1841; Hanover, Ohio.
- Died: July 7, 1929 (aged 88); Chicago, Illinois
- Occupations: Educator, relief worker
- Known for: National secretary of the Woman's Relief Corps
- Spouse(s): Silas Wheelock Plimpton, jr.
- Children: 2
- Parents: Elizabeth B. Taylor (father); Nathan Cope (mother)

Hannah Rebecca Cope Plimpton (June 19, 1841 – July 7, 1929 in Chicago, Illinois) was a Woman's Relief Corps worker.

== Early life ==
Hannah Rebecca Cope was born in Hanover, Ohio, on June 18, 1841. She was in a direct line of descendants from Oliver Cope, a Quaker, who came to America with William Penn in 1662. Her father, Nathan Cope, and mother, Elizabeth B. Taylor, were reared in West Chester, Pennsylvania. After their marriage, in 1833, they emigrated to the "Far West", to Columbiana County, Ohio, where their daughter Hannah was born, in the town of Hanover, Ohio.

In 1856, the Copes moved to Cincinnati, Ohio, to give their children better educational advantages.

== Career ==
A few years after moving to Cincinnati, Hannah Cope became one of the teachers in the public schools of that city, teaching for four years in Mount Auburn.

It was during that time, in the spring of 1862, after the Battle of Shiloh, when the wounded soldiers were sent up the Ohio River to Cincinnati, and a call was made for volunteers to help take care of them, that she, with her mother, responded and did what they could in ministering to the needs of the sick and afflicted ones, providing many delicacies and such things as were needed in a hastily improvised hospital. Finally, the old orphan asylum was secured and fitted up as comfortably as possible, and called the Washington Park Military Hospital. Many of the convalescent soldiers were entertained in Cope's home.

She always took an active part in church and temperance work, having served as treasurer and secretary in various societies, and as secretary of the local Woman's Christian Temperance Union for fifteen years.

At the institution of John A. Logan Corps, No. 56, in March 1885, in Denison, with Mrs. Mary Sears McHenry as its president, Hannah Cope, who was by then known as Hannah Plimpton, was her secretary. The following year Mrs McHenry was elected department president, and Plimpton served as department secretary. The next year she was department instituting and installing officer, and in 1889, during Mrs. Stocking's administration as department president of Iowa, she was department secretary, working again with Mrs. McHenry, who was department treasurer. In December 1889, Mrs. McHenry was elected conductor of John A. Logan Corps No. 56, and Plimpton was her assistant. They both served in that capacity until the National convention, held in Boston, on August 5, 1890, when she was appointed national secretary of the Woman's Relief Corps. In the fall of 1891, she was elected matron of the National Woman's Relief Corps Home, in Madison, Ohio.

== Personal life ==
After the close of the war, on August 29, 1865, Hannah Cope became the wife of Silas Wheelock Plimpton Jr. (1838–1927), of Providence, Rhode Island, and moved to Caldwell County, Missouri, residing there nine years, and moving from there to her home in Denison, Iowa. The couple had two children: Lois Elizabeth Plimpton (b. 1869) and Nathan Cope Plimpton (b. 1873).

They moved to Chicago and lived at 6027 University Avenue. Her husband died in Chicago on October 6, 1927.
