= New Boston Village Historic District =

Historic district in Massachusetts, United States

- U.S. National Register of Historic Places
- U.S. Historic district
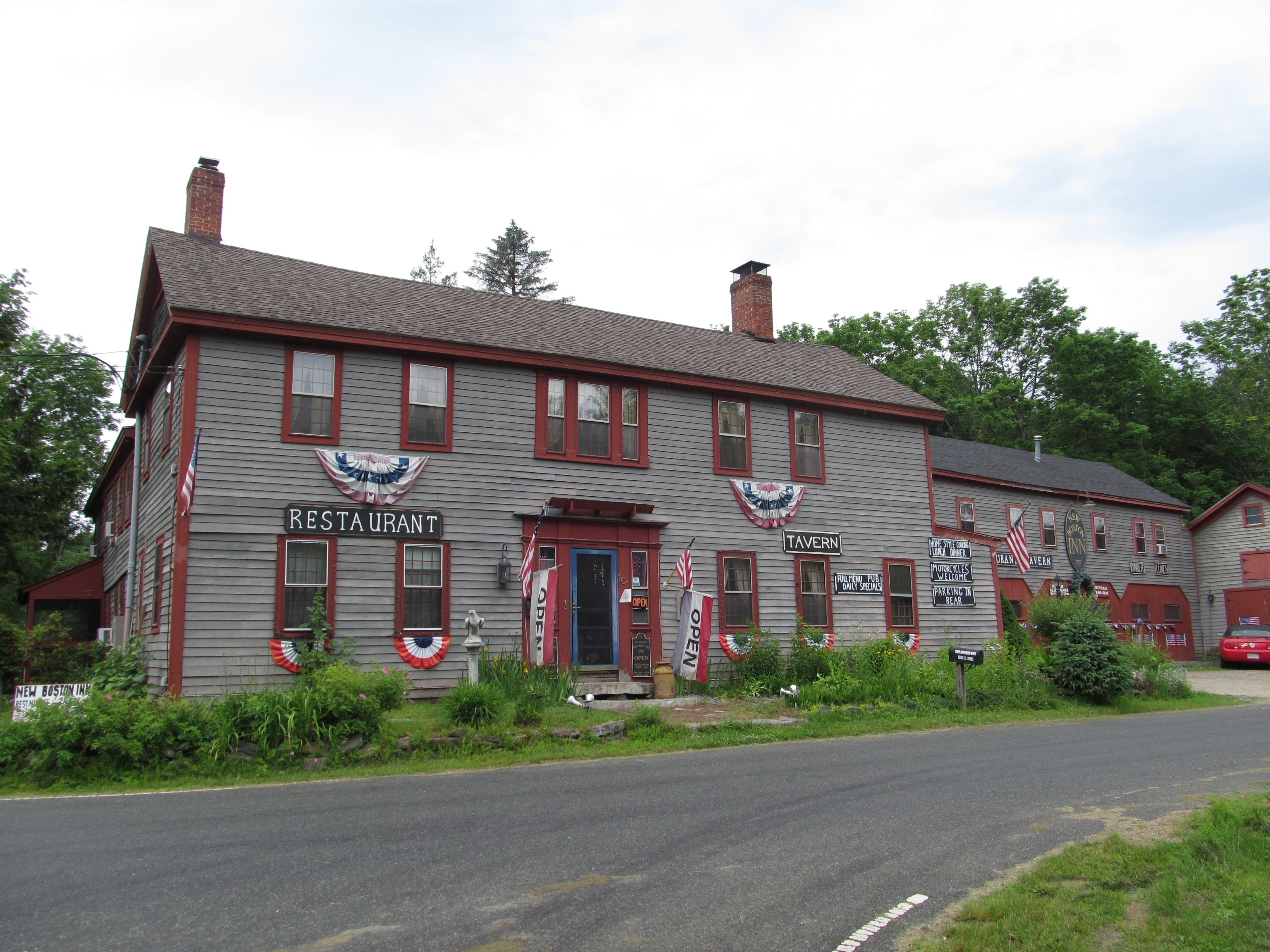
- The New Boston Inn

- Location within Massachusetts Location within the United States
- Location: 97-101 North Main and 79-110 South Main Sts. (MA 8), 2-4 Tolland (MA 57), 3-22 Sandisfield, (MA 57), and 2 River Rds., 4 Cannon Mountain and 3 & 5 Willow Lns., Sandisfield, Massachusetts
- Coordinates: 42°5′38″N 73°4′37″W
- Area: 256 acres (104 ha)
- NRHP reference No.: 100007554
- Added to NRHP: April 8, 2022

The New Boston Village Historic District is a historic district encompassing the heart of the oldest village in Sandisfield, Massachusetts. It includes properties on Massachusetts Route 57, New Marlborough, Monterey and Southfield Roads. It was the town's civic heart through the late 19th century, and retains character from that period. The district was added to the National Register of Historic Places in 1982.

== Description and history ==
New Boston is a rural village in central eastern Sandisfield, not far from the town line with Tolland. The center of the village is essentially a crossroads bisected by the north–south flow of the West Branch Farmington River, with Massachusetts Route 57 running east–west, and Massachusetts Route 8 running north–south, crossing a bridge with Route 57 at the village center. The main intersection is dominated by the New Boston Inn, located on the northwest corner. With its oldest part dating to the 1750s, it is one of the town's oldest surviving buildings, and has served as a public accommodation for much of the town's history. Also present in the village are a variety of residential and formerly commercial properties dating to the first half of the 19th century, representing the height of its economic prosperity.

The area that is now Sandisfield was acquired by colonial proprietors in the 1730s, with settlement not beginning until the 1750s, when the Brown family arrived in what is now New Boston village. Although it did not become the town center (owing to its geographic placement in its far east), the village flourished as a crossroads on a major east–west route across the Berkshires, as well as a location of water-powered light industry. Both agriculture and industry declined in the second half of the 19th century after the town was bypassed by railroad development.

== See also ==
- National Register of Historic Places listings in Berkshire County, Massachusetts
