= New Boston Inn =

- U.S. National Register of Historic Places
- U.S. Historic district – Contributing property
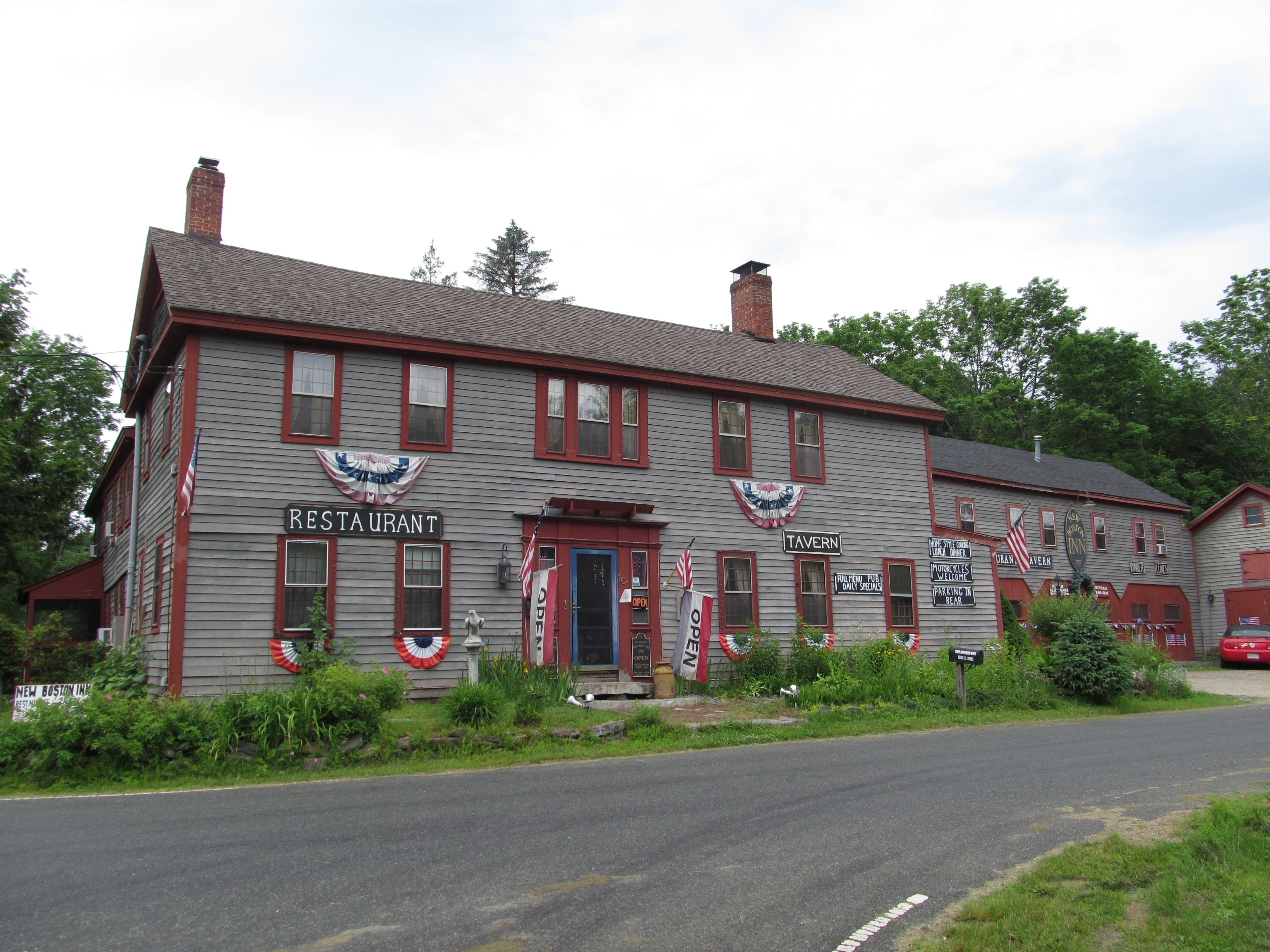
- New Boston Inn

- Location within Massachusetts Location within the United States
- Location: 101 N. Main St., Sandisfield, Massachusetts
- Coordinates: 42°5′38″N 73°4′40″W
- Area: 2 acres (0.81 ha)
- Built: 1750
- Architectural style: Federal
- Part of: New Boston Village Historic District (ID100007554)
- NRHP reference No.: 88001459

Significant dates
- Added to NRHP: September 1, 1988
- Designated CP: April 8, 2022

The New Boston Inn is a historic inn at 101 North Main Street, the junction of Massachusetts Routes 8 and 57 in the center of the New Boston village of Sandisfield, Massachusetts. With a construction history dating back to c. 1750, it is one of the oldest buildings in the town, and a prominent local example of Federal period architecture. It has served as a traveler accommodation of some sort for over two centuries. The building was listed on the National Register of Historic Places in 1988.

== Description and history ==
The New Boston Inn occupies a prominent location in the center of New Boston village, at the northwest corner of Routes 8 and 57. Both roads are historically old roads, and the bridge over the West Branch Farmington River just to the inn's east is at the site of one of the first bridges to be built in what is now Sandisfield. The inn is a 2 1/2-story clapboarded wood-frame structure with Federal period styling. Its main entrance is flanked by sidelights and topped by an entablature, with a Palladian window in the second floor above. Inside, the second-floor ballroom is noted for arched ceiling. Extending west, and facing Route 57, is a two-story ell that is probably the oldest portion of the building. Extending northward from that ell is another long two-story ell.

The area that is now Sandisfield was first settled in 1740s. One of the early settlers was Daniel Brown, whose house is recorded as standing on this site in 1752. He is also later recorded as being an innkeeper. The architecture of the ell is consistent with the idea that it constitutes in large part the house that Brown built. Brown's son Sanford, who took over the property in 1792, was likely responsible for the construction of what is now the main portion of the inn. The inn flourished economically, in part because it was on the main stagecoach route between Hartford, Connecticut and Albany, New York. Although business declined as the expansion of railroads led to a decline in business on the stage routes, the inn was updated around 1885 to a "country hotel". It was revitalized with the advent of increased automobile traffic in the 1920s, which brought tourists to the area.

== See also ==
- National Register of Historic Places listings in Berkshire County, Massachusetts
