= Indian Orchard, Springfield, Massachusetts =

Neighborhood in Springfield, Massachusetts, United States

Coordinates: 42°9′33.6″N 72°29′58.1″W

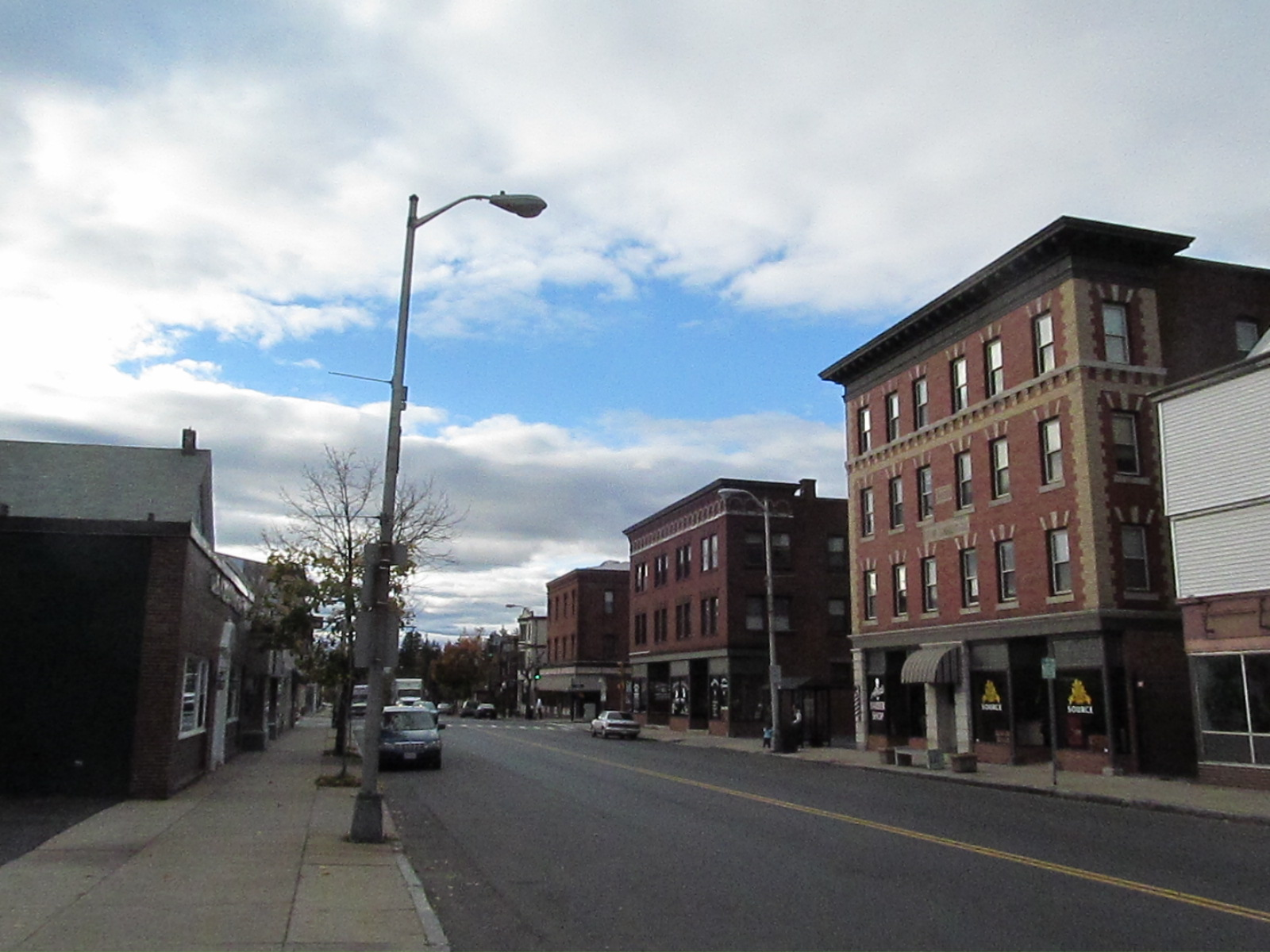
Main Street, Indian Orchard

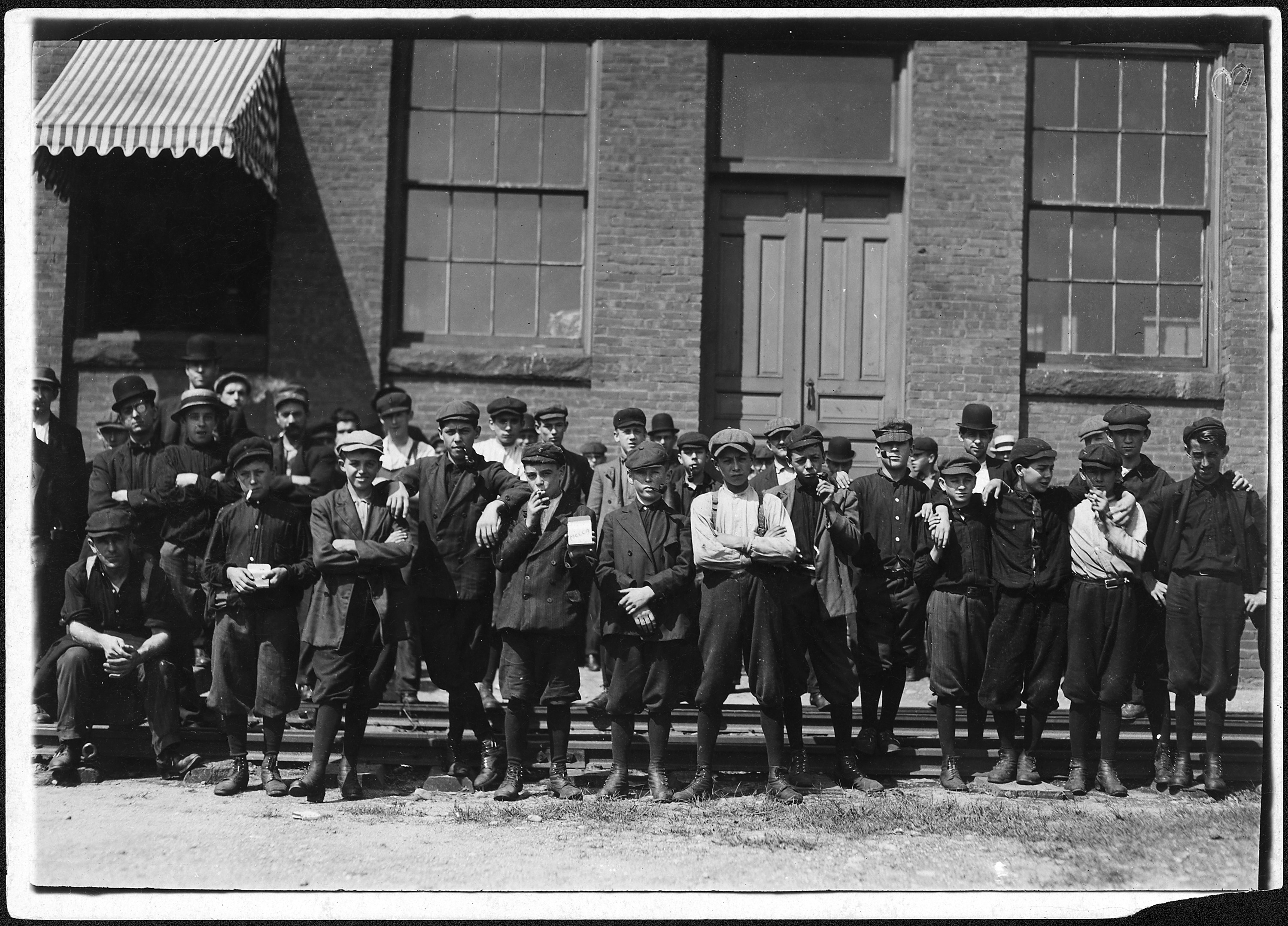
Child laborers at Indian Orchard Manufacturing Company, 1911. Photo by Lewis Hine.

Indian Orchard is a village in Springfield, Massachusetts. Located in the northeast corner of Springfield, next to the Chicopee River, Indian Orchard is the city's fifth largest neighborhood.

== History ==
Indian Orchard began in the 1840s as an isolated mill town and has preserved its identity over the years, even after becoming more fully encompassed by Springfield. Many of the early mill workers were French-Canadian immigrants.

The First Congregational Church of Indian Orchard, built in 1863, is Springfield's third-oldest church.

Indian Orchard was also home to Chapman Valve Manufacturing Company, which converted uranium rods into slugs to be used as nuclear reactor fuel, for the U.S. Army Corps of Engineers Manhattan Engineer District. The site was remediated in 1995. It is now occupied by a solar energy facility.

== Neighborhood ==
One of Indian Orchard's former mills is now a large artists' studio space; this has been the catalyst for the neighborhood's growing arts & crafts scene. The Indian Orchard Mills/Dane Gallery hosts an artists' open house twice a year. Hubbard Park is a major source of recreational activities. The Indian Orchard branch of the Springfield Library offers adult and family activities. The neighborhood is also home to Lake Lorraine State Park, a swimming beach formerly open to the public; however, the beach has been closed since budget cuts in 2009. Large employers include Solutia and a US Postal Service bulk mail facility.

Indian Orchard is home to the Titanic Museum.
