= Barnstable State Forest =

Protected area in Massachusetts, United States

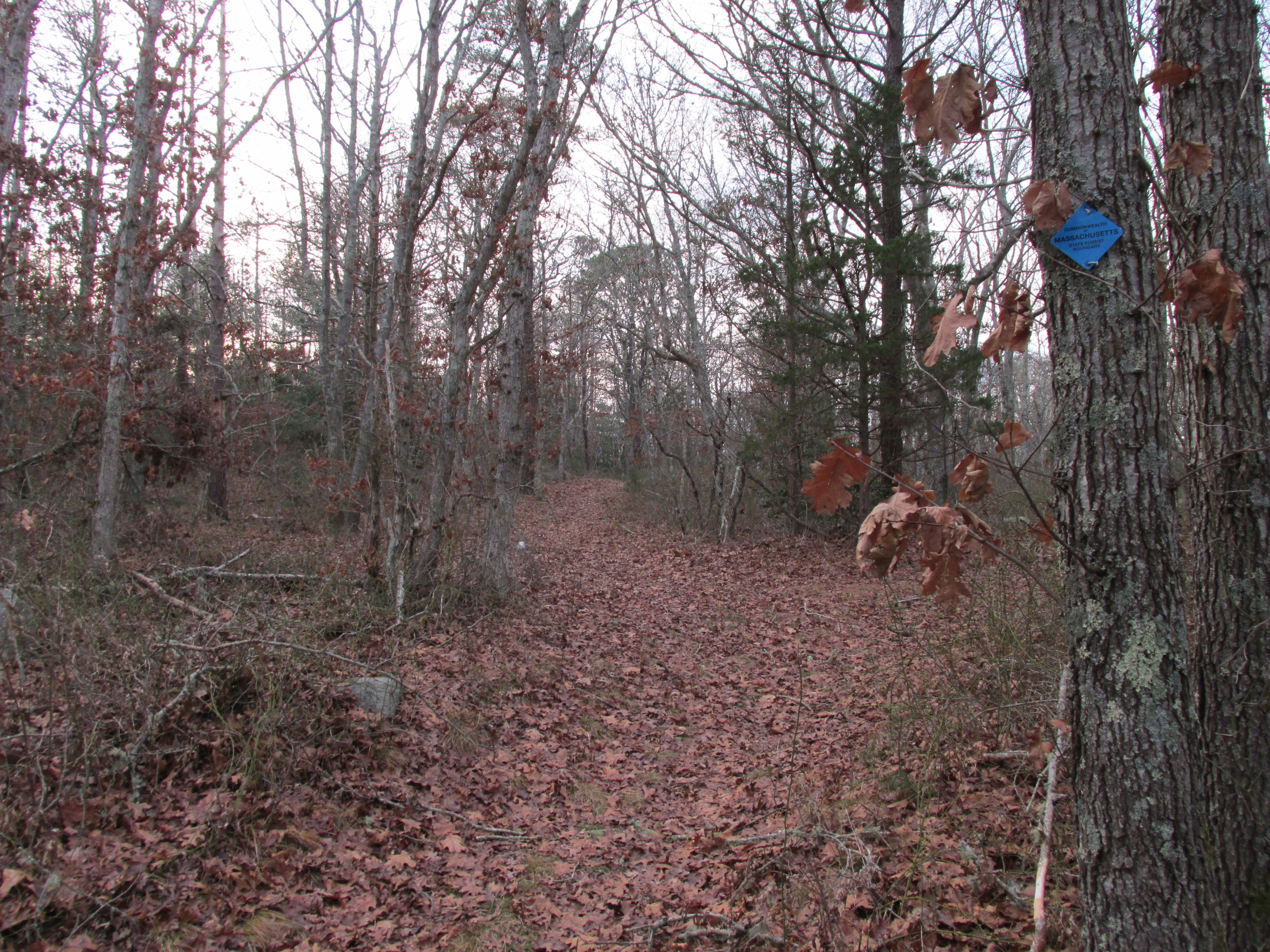
- Entering Barnstable State Forest

- Location within Massachusetts
- Interactive map of Barnstable State Forest

Geography
- Location: Barnstable County, Massachusetts, United States
- Coordinates: 41°41′23.51″N 70°20′40.04″W

Administration
- Authority: Massachusetts Department of Conservation and Recreation

Barnstable State Forest is a Massachusetts state forest located in Barnstable. The forest is managed by the Department of Conservation and Recreation (DCR).

== See also ==
- List of Massachusetts state forests
