= South River State Forest =

Protected area in Massachusetts, United States

- Location within Massachusetts Location within the United States
- Interactive map of South River State Forest

Geography
- Location: Bristol County, Massachusetts, United States
- Coordinates: 42°33′27″N 72°41′4″W
- Elevation: 243 ft (74 m)
- Area: 591 acres (239 ha)

Administration
- Established: 1965
- Authority: Massachusetts Department of Conservation and Recreation

South River State Forest covers 591 acres (239 ha) in Conway, Massachusetts. The forest is managed by the Department of Conservation and Recreation.

== Description ==
The South River State Forest consists of two separate sections—one adjacent to Bardwell's Ferry Bridge and the other where the old Conway Electric Street Railway met the New York, New Haven and Hartford Railroad line. Its name comes from the river that runs through it, part of the Deerfield River watershed.

The Mahican-Mohawk Trail runs through the park, often following the location of the abandoned New York, New Haven and Hartford Railroad.

== See also ==
- List of Massachusetts state forests
