= Mary Sears McHenry =

American philanthropist (1834–1912)

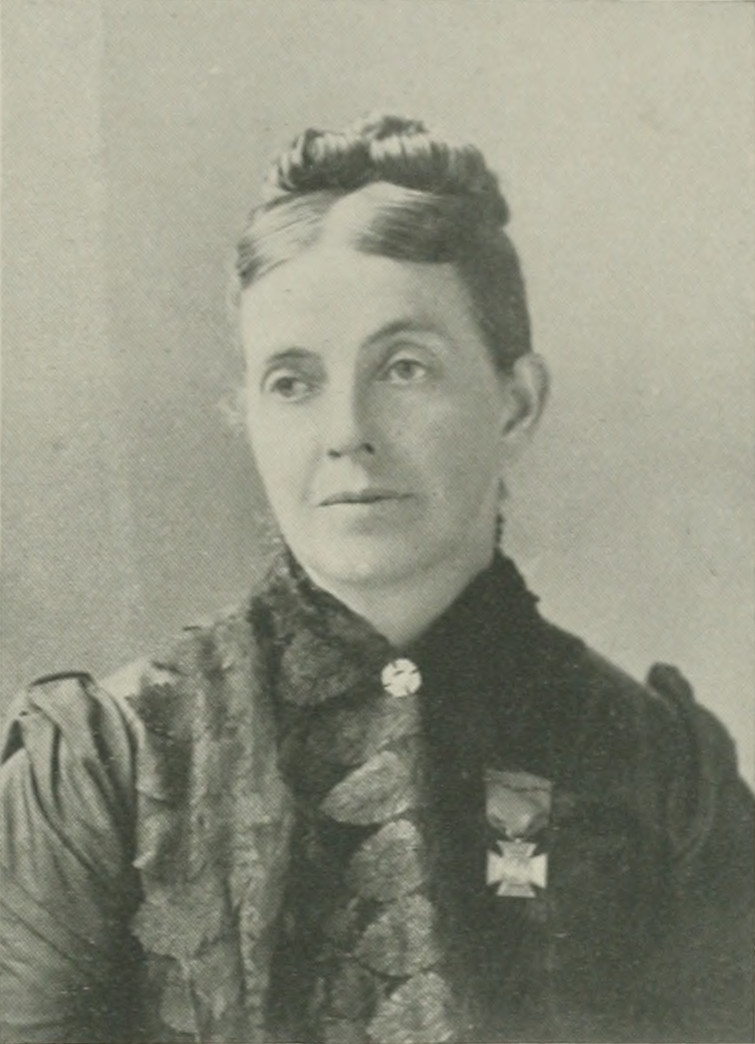
- Portrait photo from A Woman of the Century
- Born: Mary Sears; December 30, 1834; New Boston, Sandisfield, Massachusetts, U.S.
- Died: July 26, 1912 (aged 77); Lake Okoboji, Iowa, U.S.
- Known for: National President, Woman's Relief Corps
- Spouse: William A. McHenry (m. 1864)

Mary Sears McHenry (December 30, 1834 – July 26, 1912) was an American charitable organization leader who served as the eighth National President of the Woman's Relief Corps (WRC) in 1890, which at the time, was the largest fraternal association in the country.

== Early life and education ==
Mary Sears was a native of New Boston village, in the town of Sandisfield, Berkshire County, Massachusetts, December 30, 1834. Her parents were David G. and Olive (Deming) Sears.

She was descended from an old English family that included preachers, scholars, patriots and nobles. The Sears family was of Saxon origin, and the family line extended back to Edward III. The U.S. branch came directly from Richard Sears, who was married to Lady Anne Bonchier Knyvet. Their only son, John Bonchier Sears, was married to Elizabeth, daughter of Sir John Hawkins, the navigator and admiral. Their great-grandson, Richard Sears, came to America and was called "the Pilgrim." He married and settled in Plymouth, and his descendants have distinguished themselves as patriots, scholars, statesmen and philanthropists. Some of their descendants were foremost in resenting the Stamp act. Isaac Sears led the company that marched to the house of the lieutenant-governor to demand the stamps. Such was the energy of Isaac Sears and his influence in the American Colonies that he was nicknamed "King Sears". Two of this family fitted out at their own expense war vessels, which engaged in battles on the sea during the American Revolutionary War. One of them established the first bank in America. Barnas Sears, D.D., LL.D., an uncle of McHenry, served as professor in Hamilton College, New York, was later president of Newton Theological Seminary, then president of Brown University, and afterwards was superintendent of the Peabody Education Fund.

David G. Sears, after the birth of his daughter Mary, resided successively in Hartford, Connecticut and in New York City, engaged in the mercantile business. The family subsequently settled in Ogle County, Illinois, where the father purchased a section of land and applied himself to farming. Mary Sears completed her school studies at the Rockford Seminary (now Rockford University) in Rockford, Illinois.

== Career ==
It was in Rockford that she met William A. McHenry, a young man employed by her father. Their courtship was interrupted by the American Civil War's call for volunteers. In the stress of patriotism, marriage plans were held in abeyance and the young man enlisted for three years of service. After three years in the army, Mr. McHenry's period of enlistment ended and it was planned that he should return to Illinois, to wed. After his re-enlistment as a sergeant of Company S, 8th Regiment Illinois Volunteer Cavalry, he obtained a furlough and on January 28, 1864, the couple wed at the Rockford home.

The furlough was for 30 days. During that time, William's brother, Morris, then treasurer of Crawford County, Iowa, visited his brother and his wife, and knowing her clerical ability and excellent handwriting, he proposed that she come to Crawford County to act as deputy treasurer and recorder. This offer was accepted and Mrs. McHenry moved to this county, while her husband rejoined his regiment.

When her husband returned from the war, they settled in Denison, Iowa. The husband became a banker and a breeder of Angus cattle. He was interested in the Relief Corps and also in other patriotic and charitable work in which his wife was a leader. He was Department Commander of Iowa Grand Army of the Republic (GAR), 1886–87, and represented that order in San Francisco at the GAR'S National Encampment in 1886. A local camp of Sons of Veterans (S. of V.) bears his name, W. A. McHenry Camp, S. of V., No. 53.

In July 1883, at the WRC convention in Denver, Colorado, of all the women's societies in the country that were working for the GAR, McHenry was an unauthorized representative from Iowa. The Denver convention resulted in the organization of the National WRC. Upon McHenry's return to Denison, a local corps was formed under her leadership. She was elected President thereof, her secretary was Hannah Cope Plimpton, and was active in the work throughout the State. After serving in various other capacities, she was chosen Department President of Iowa, and later served as Department Treasurer. At the convention held in Tremont Temple, Boston, in July 1890, McHenry was elected National President of the WRC, to succeed Annie Turner Wittenmyer. During McHenry's administration, many corps and members were added to its rolls. At the next national convention, in Detroit, Michigan, in August 1891, McHenry gave a detailed and interesting account of the year's work.

McHenry was a liberal contributor to various charities. In her later life, she was interested in public work.

== Personal life ==
The McHenrys had four children, two sons and two daughters. She died at her summer home on the banks of Lake Okoboji, (Note: There are two similarly named lakes in the same area—East Okoboji Lake and West Okoboji Lake—and the sources do not specify which was the site of McHenry's home. There is a location on West Okoboji Lake called McHenry's Point, named for a former resident.) in Iowa, on July 26, 1912. Her remains were brought to Denison, and she was buried in the Oakland cemetery.
