= Lake Lorraine State Park =

State park in Hampden County, Massachusetts

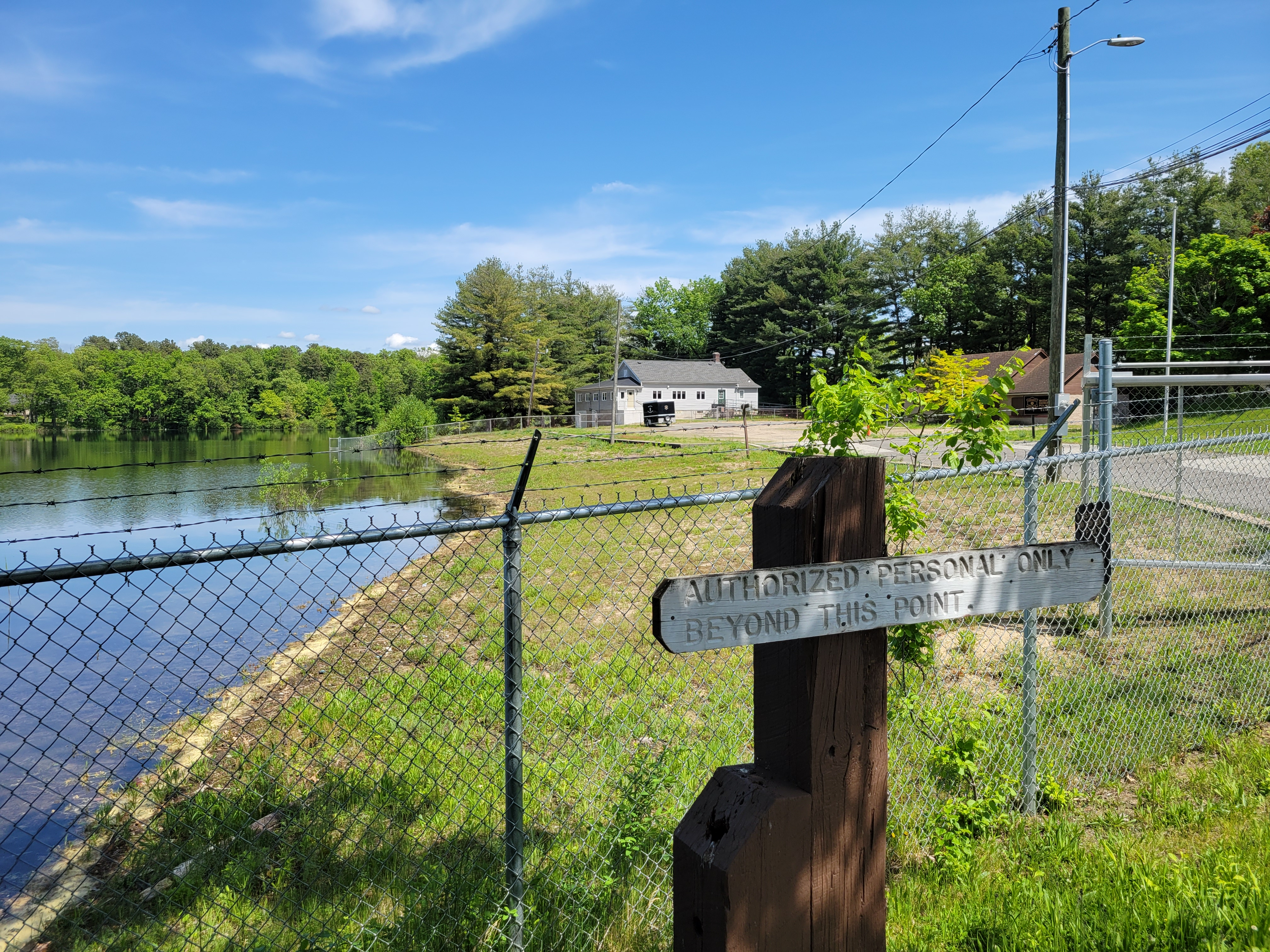
- Former Lake Lorraine State Park

- Location within Massachusetts Location within the United States
- Location: Springfield, Hampden, Massachusetts, United States
- Coordinates: 42°08′40″N 72°30′48″W
- Area: 3 acres (1.2 ha)
- Elevation: 207 ft (63 m)
- Established: 1989
- Operator: Massachusetts Department of Conservation and Recreation
- Website: Lake Lorraine State Park (archived)

Lake Lorraine State Park was a small Massachusetts state park located in the neighborhood of Indian Orchard, on the northeast side of the city of Springfield. The park was located on the southern shore of Lake Lorraine and once offered a sand beach, swimming, fishing, and restrooms. The state park has been unstaffed and closed since 2009 due to claimed budget cuts by the Massachusetts state government. The park was later quietly turned over for use by the Environmental Police as a satellite headquarters.

The beach is now completely overgrown and all picnic facilities and State Park signage were removed sometime after 2014. Only members of the Massachusetts Environmental Police are allowed within the park property and the gates of the park are kept locked at all times. Thefts of unattended equipment left by the Environmental Police in June 2015 led to more aggressive prosecution of trespassers. Signs threatening state fines as well as an infrared trap camera were installed at the entrance to the park for some time. The park is managed by the Department of Conservation and Recreation.
