= Federated Women's Club State Forest =

Protected area in Massachusetts, United States

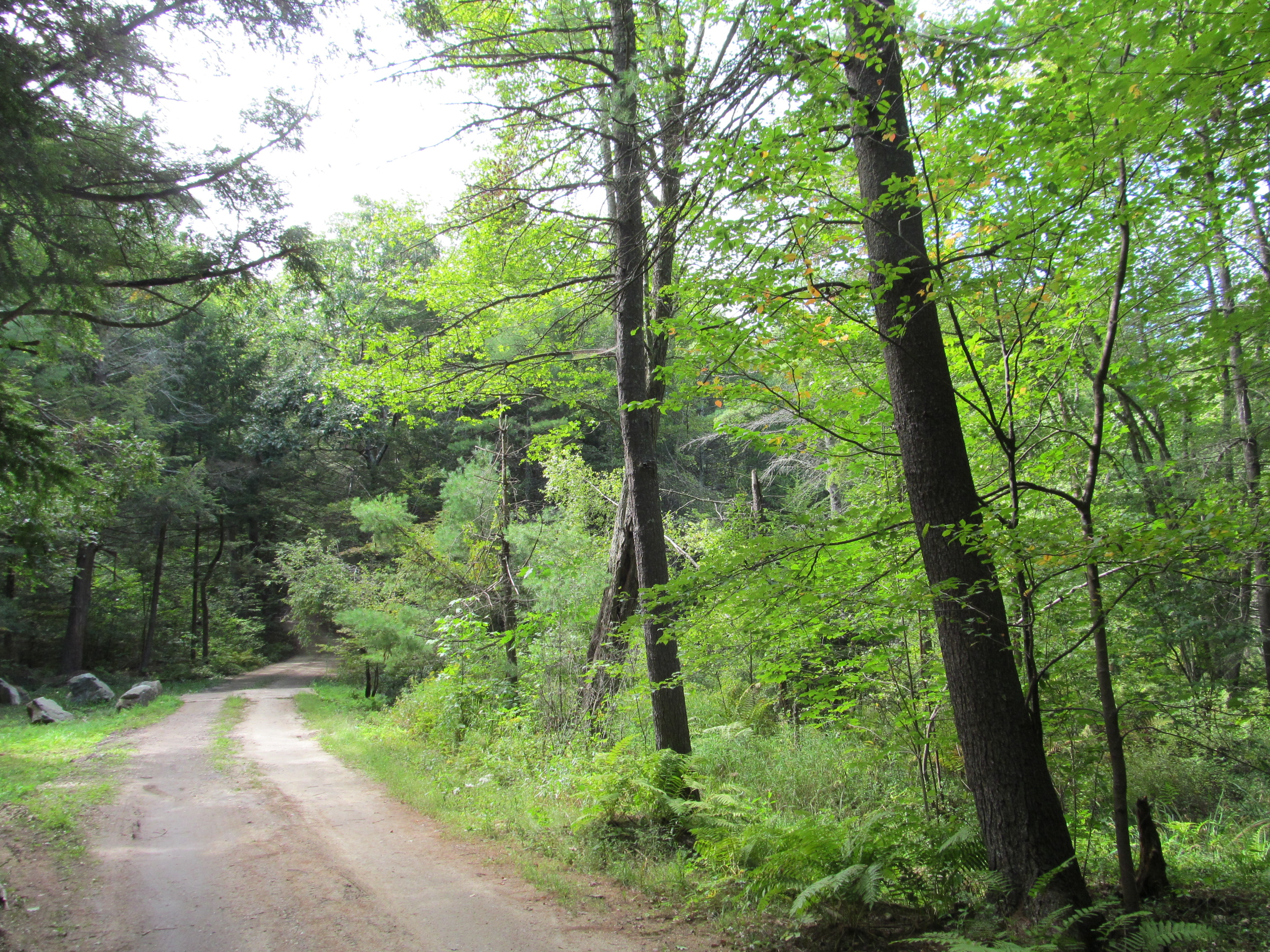
- West Street

- Location within Massachusetts Location within the United States
- Location: Petersham and New Salem, Massachusetts, United States
- Coordinates: 42°29′55″N 72°14′19″W
- Area: 984 acres (398 ha)
- Elevation: 692 ft (211 m)
- Administrator: Massachusetts Department of Conservation and Recreation
- Website: Official website

Federated Women's Club State Forest is a Massachusetts state forest located in the towns of Petersham and New Salem. Notable forest scenery is found along wooded roads with views of Fever Brook, which has been dammed and provides a stopover for migrating birds. The forest's most prominent geological feature, "The Gorge," is found in the southwest part of the property. The forest is managed by the Department of Conservation and Recreation.

== Activities and amenities ==
The forest offers camping, trails are used for hiking and cross-country skiing, fishing and restricted hunting.
