= C. M. Gardner State Park =

State Park in Massachusetts, United States

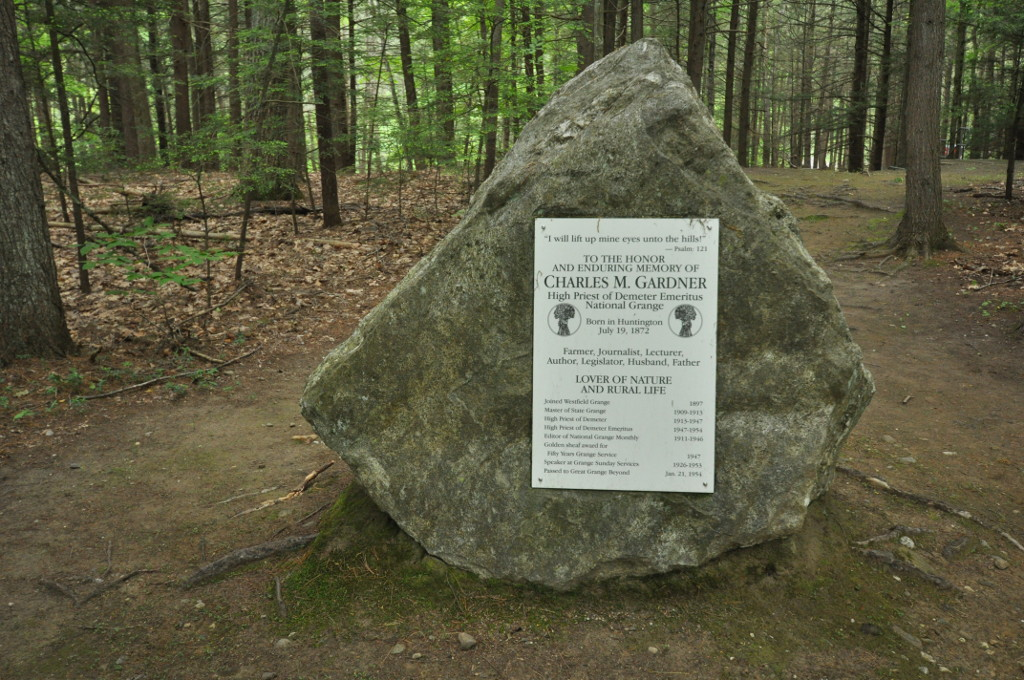
- Commemorative marker in the park

- Location within Massachusetts Location within the United States
- Interactive map of C. M. Gardner State Park
- Location: Huntington, Massachusetts, United States
- Coordinates: 42°16′30.72″N 72°52′14.52″W
- Area: 85 acres (34 ha)
- Elevation: 440 ft (130 m)
- Established: 1959
- Administrator: Massachusetts Department of Conservation and Recreation
- Website: Official website

C. M. Gardner State Park is a Massachusetts state park, located in the town of Huntington, along a section of the east branch of the Westfield River. The land was donated to the state in 1959, in memory of Charles M. Gardner, a local farmer, writer, and National Grange leader. It is managed by the Department of Conservation and Recreation.

== Activities and amenities ==
The park offers walking trails, picnicking, restrooms, a boat launch for canoeing, and fishing on the Westfield River. Restricted hunting is also available. Swimming has been prohibited since 2006, due to failure to meet water quality standards.
