= Wompatuck State Park =

State park in Massachusetts, United States

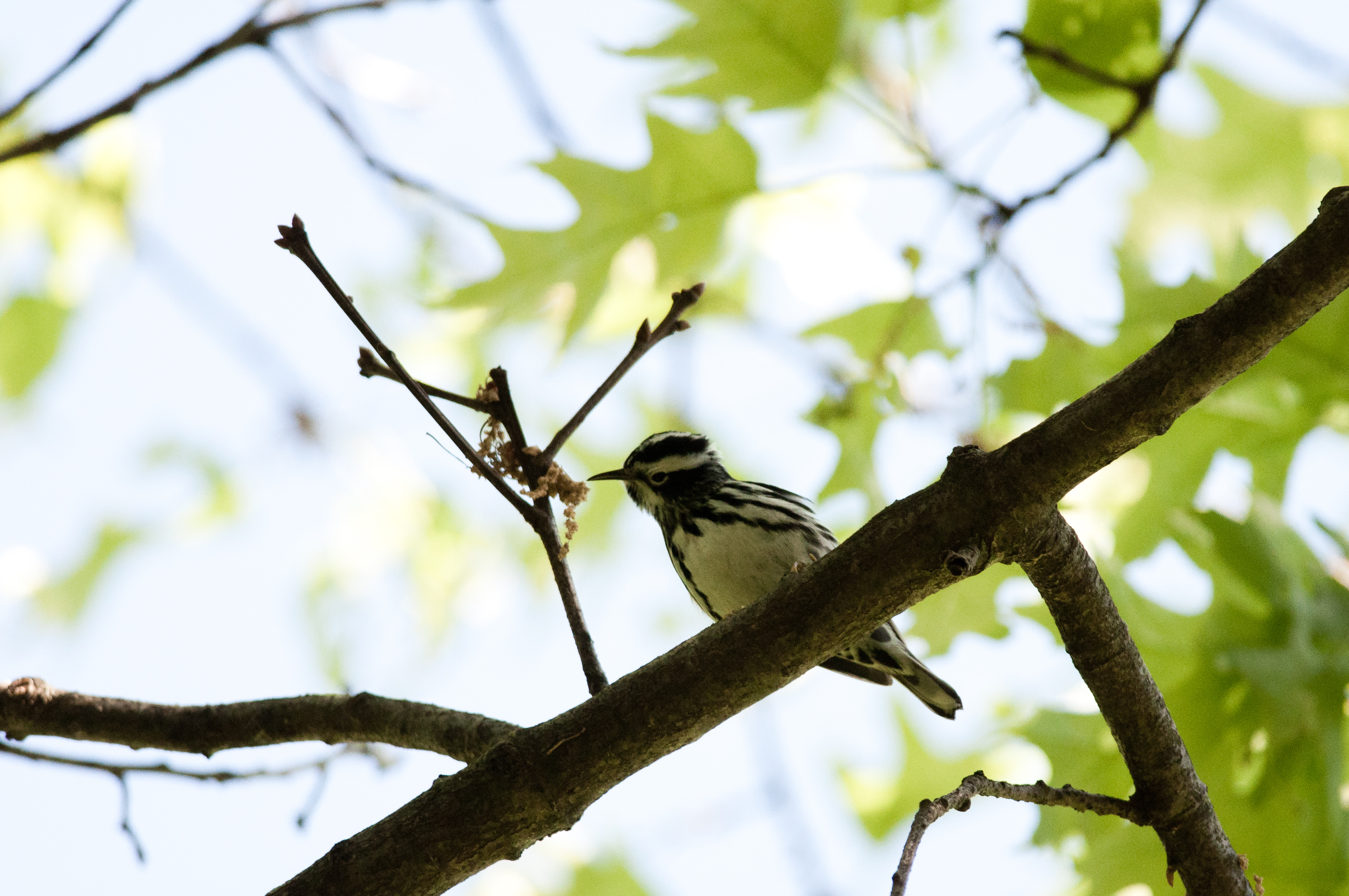
- Black-and-white warbler in Wompatuck State Park

- Location within Massachusetts Location within the United States
- Location: Hingham, Cohasset, Norwell, and Scituate, Massachusetts, United States
- Coordinates: 42°12′27″N 70°49′34″W
- Area: 3,579 acres (1,448 ha)
- Elevation: 62 ft (19 m)
- Established: 1969
- Administrator: Massachusetts Department of Conservation and Recreation
- Named for: Indian Chief Josiah Wompatuck
- Website: Official website

Wompatuck State Park is a public recreation area of about 3,500 acres (1,400 ha) in size. It is located primarily in the town of Hingham, with portions in the neighboring towns of Cohasset, Norwell, and Scituate, Massachusetts, in the United States. In addition to a large campground and an extensive trail system, the park is noted for the free spring water that can be obtained at Mt. Blue Spring, which has been in operation since the mid-19th century. The park is managed by the Massachusetts Department of Conservation and Recreation which protects forests of the northeastern coastal forests ecoregion.

== History ==
The land was originally the property of Native American chief Josiah Wompatuck, who deeded the land to English settlers in 1655. The park is built on the former Hingham Naval Ammunition Depot Annex (known by natives as the "Cohasset Annex"), which was in use from 1941 until 1965. It contains over 100 decommissioned military bunkers, many of which have been backfilled, but some of which remain exposed, including one which housed parts of the Navy's first nuclear depth charge in the 1950s. Several old military buildings can be found on park property as well as an extensive network of abandoned railroad. Most buildings have had their roofs and windows removed and are open to the elements.

Whitney Spur

A rail spur known as the Whitney Spur formerly connected the Ammunition Depot to the Old Colony Railroad's Greenbush Line. In 2003, the DCR sold the land for the Cohasset commuter rail station and parking lot to the MBTA in exchange for the construction of a rail trail on the former rail spur. The station opened with the rest of the Greenbush Line on October 31, 2007. The 1.5-mile (2.4 km) Whitney Spur Rail Trail opened from the station to the park around the same time.

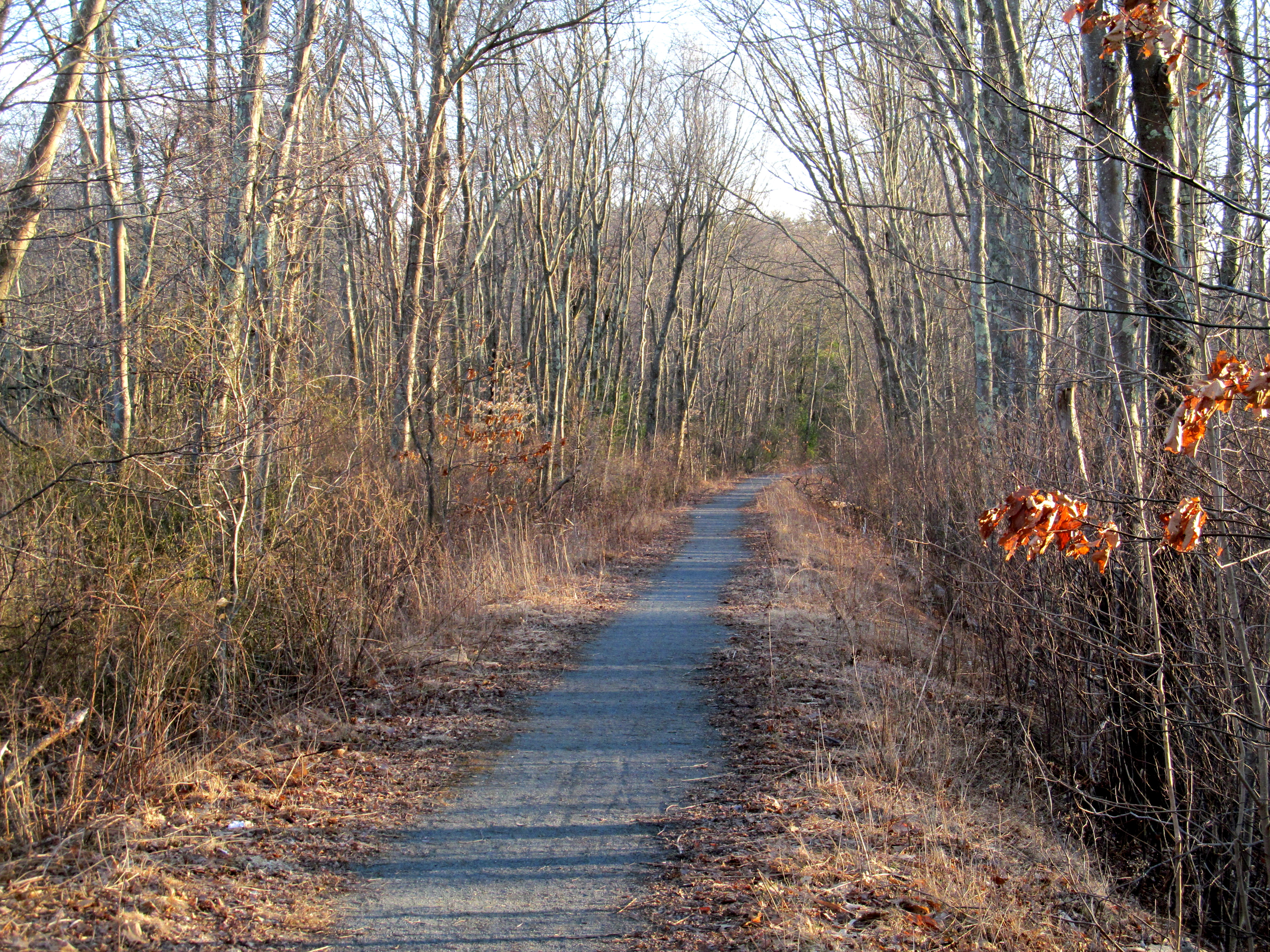
Whitney Spur Rail Trail in March 2014

However, a gate blocked access from the trail to the northwest section of the park, which still had several dangerous abandoned buildings. After years of requests, demolition of the buildings began in April 2014. The northwest section opened in November 2014 and the gate was removed. With the trail now serving as usable access to the park, 20 spaces in the station lot were dedicated for park users.

== Activities and amenities ==
The park's campground offers 262 campsites, 140 of which have electrical service. Camping is open from mid-April until mid-October. A boat ramp allows access to Aaron River Reservoir for non-motorized boating. Park trails include 12 miles of paved bicycle routes as well as trails for hiking, mountain biking, horseback riding, and cross-country skiing. Upland game bird hunting is allowed in season in the South Field area.
