= Dean Pond =

Lake in Putnam County, New York, U.S.

- Deane Pond
- Location within New York
- Interactive map of Dean Pond
- Location: Somers, New York
- Coordinates: 41°27′26.90″N 73°41′8.16″W
- Type: Pond
- Basin countries: United States
- Surface area: 12 acres (4.9 ha)
- Surface elevation: 728 feet (222 m)
- Settlements: Lake Carmel, New York

Dean Pond is a lake in Putnam County, in the U.S. state of New York. The pond has a surface area of 12 acres (4.9 ha).

Dean Pond was named after the local Dean family.
