= Jug End State Reservation and Wildlife Management Area =

Protected area in Massachusetts, United States

Jug End State Reservation & Wildlife Management Area
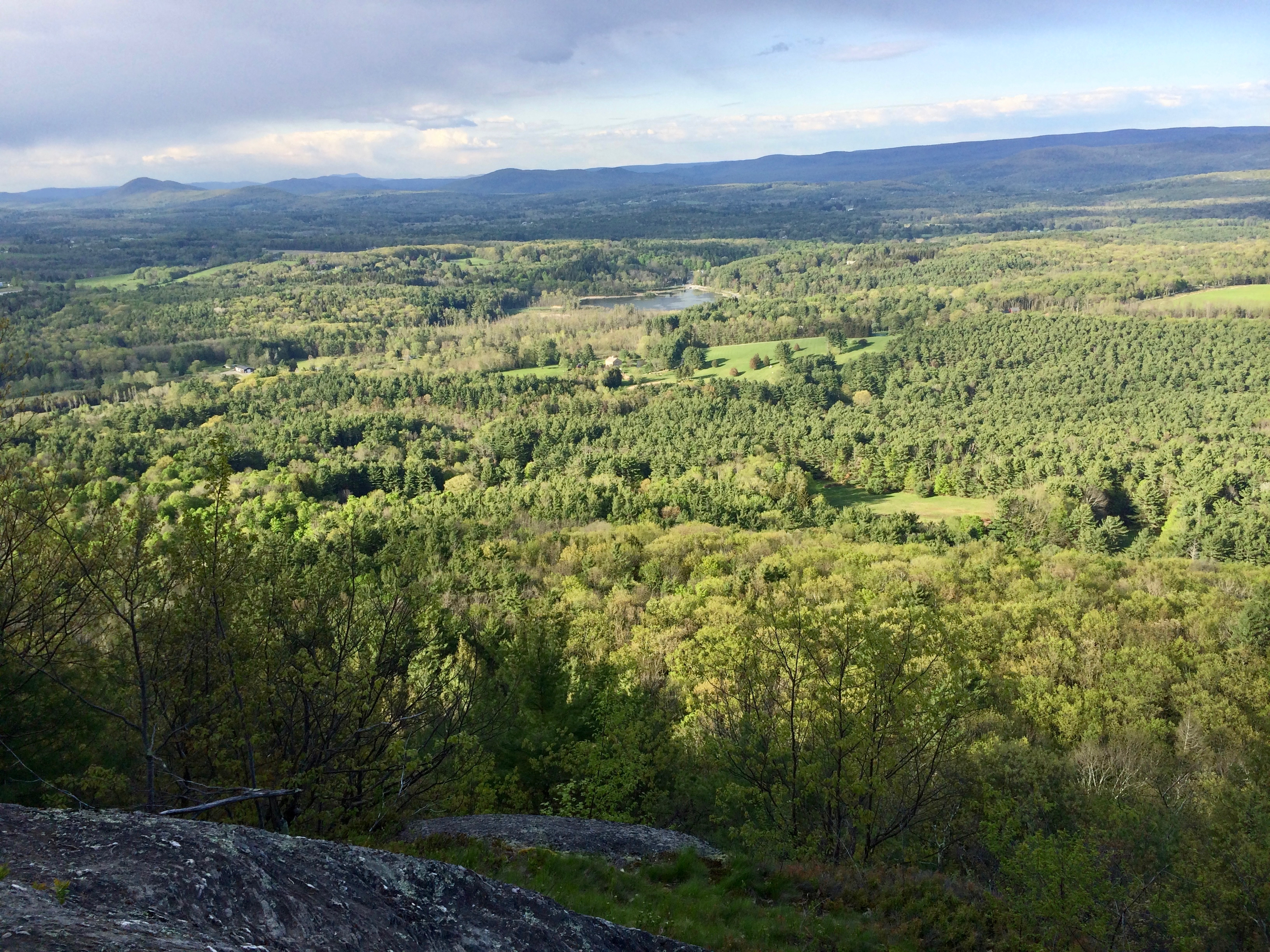
- View of Guilder Hollow Road & the Berkshires from Jug End peak

- Location within Massachusetts Location within the United States
- Location: Egremont and Mount Washington, Massachusetts, United States
- Coordinates: 42°08′37″N 73°26′20″W
- Area: 1,191 acres (482 ha)
- Elevation: 1,499 ft (457 m)
- Established: 1994
- Administrator: Massachusetts Department of Conservation and Recreation
- Website: Official website

Jug End State Reservation and Wildlife Management Area is a public recreation area located in the towns of Egremont and Mount Washington, Massachusetts. The reservation occupies the site of the former Jug End Barn resort, which has been allowed to return to a natural state. Mount Everett State Reservation is adjacent to the south. It is managed by the Department of Conservation and Recreation.

== History ==
The Jug End Barn ski resort operated under various owners from 1938 until its permanent closure in 1983. The state took control of the property in 1994, enacting a program of environmental remediation to return the property to a suitable condition for use by the public.

== Activities and amenities ==
The Jug End Loop Trail passes through 2 miles (3.2 km) of open fields, northern hardwood and eastern hemlock woodlands. A portion of the Appalachian Trail also crosses the property.
