= Hanover, Ohio =

- Village
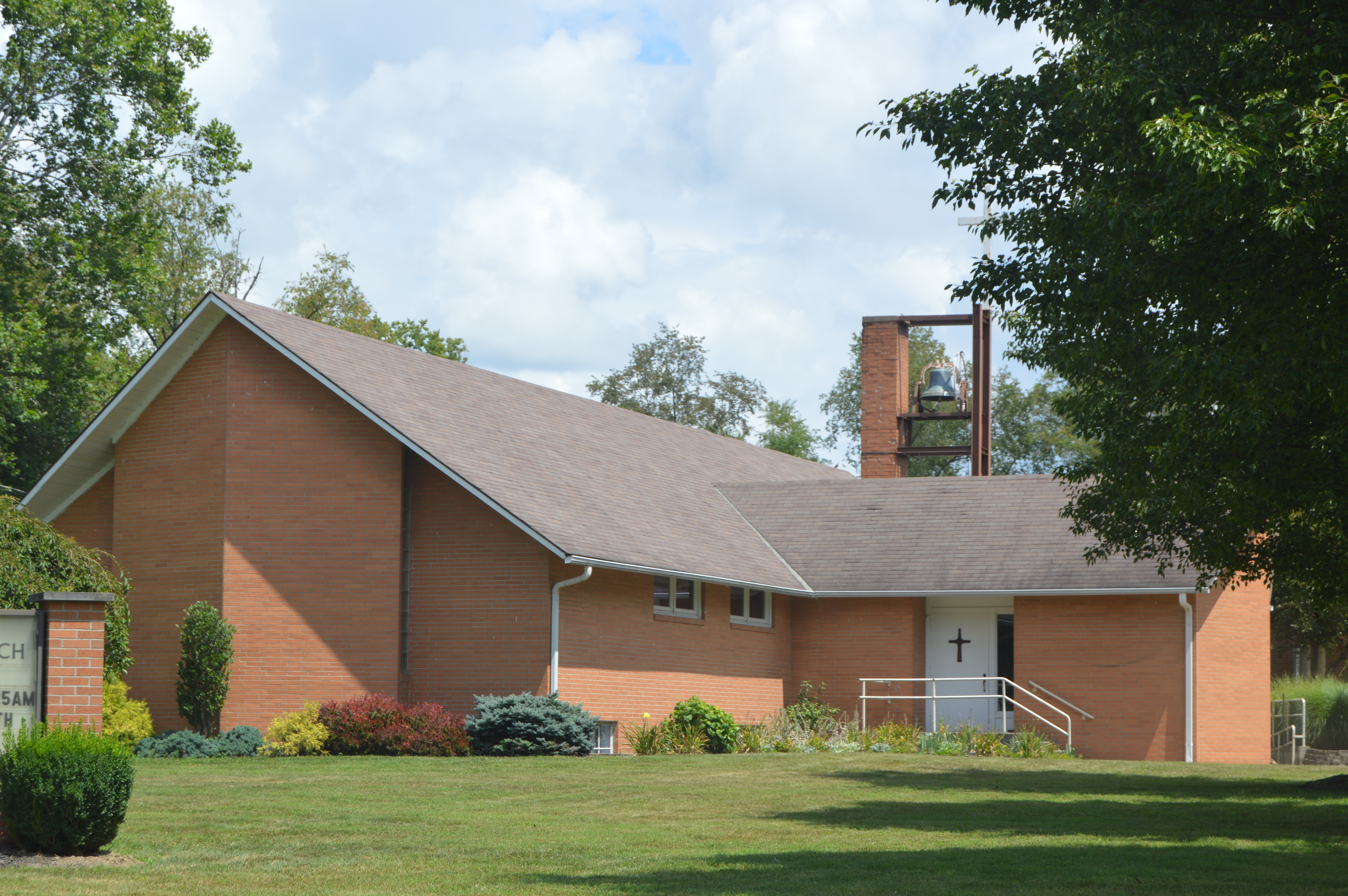
- Presbyterian church

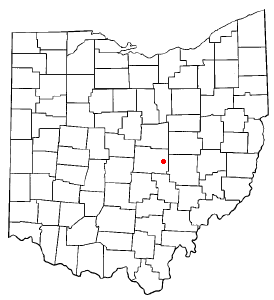
- Location of Hanover, Ohio

- Location within Licking County
- Coordinates: 40°04′55″N 82°16′34″W
- Country: United States
- State: Ohio
- County: Licking

Area
  - Total: 1.85 sq mi (4.78 km^{2})
  - Land: 1.83 sq mi (4.73 km^{2})
  - Water: 0.019 sq mi (0.05 km^{2})
- Elevation: 807 ft (246 m)

Population (2020)
  - Total: 1,270
  - Estimate (2023): 1,317
  - Density: 695.1/sq mi (268.39/km^{2})
- Time zone: UTC-5 (Eastern (EST))
  - Summer (DST): UTC-4 (EDT)
- FIPS code: 39-33292
- GNIS feature ID: 2398241
- Website: https://hanoverohio.net/

Hanover is a village in Licking County, Ohio, United States. The population was 1,270 at the 2020 census. The village lies along Ohio State Route 16.

== History ==
Hanover was laid out in 1849, although there had been business activity at the site for some time. An early variant name was Fleming, for John Fleming, the original owner of the town site.

== Geography ==
According to the United States Census Bureau, the village has a total area of 1.68 square miles (4.35 km^{2}), of which 1.66 square miles (4.30 km^{2}) is land and 0.02 square miles (0.05 km^{2}) is water.

== Demographics ==
Historical population
Census	Pop.	Note	%±
1870	322		—
1880	302		−6.2%
1890	288		−4.6%
1900	314		9.0%
1910	331		5.4%
1920	321		−3.0%
1930	355		10.6%
1940	325		−8.5%
1950	308		−5.2%
1960	267		−13.3%
1970	626		134.5%
1980	926		47.9%
1990	803		−13.3%
2000	885		10.2%
2010	921		4.1%
2020	1,270		37.9%
2023 (est.)	1,317	▲	3.7%
U.S. Decennial Census

=== 2010 census ===
As of the census of 2010, there were 921 people, 323 households, and 253 families living in the village. The population density was 554.8 inhabitants per square mile (214.2/km^{2}). There were 334 housing units at an average density of 201.2 per square mile (77.7/km^{2}). The racial makeup of the village was 97.5% White, 1.0% African American, 0.3% Native American, 0.2% Asian, 0.4% from other races, and 0.5% from two or more races. Hispanic or Latino of any race were 0.7% of the population.

There were 323 households, of which 42.7% had children under the age of 18 living with them, 64.1% were married couples living together, 11.5% had a female householder with no husband present, 2.8% had a male householder with no wife present, and 21.7% were non-families. 17.0% of all households were made up of individuals, and 9.3% had someone living alone who was 65 years of age or older. The average household size was 2.85 and the average family size was 3.21.

The median age in the village was 37.5 years. 29.3% of residents were under the age of 18; 6.9% were between the ages of 18 and 24; 23.7% were from 25 to 44; 26.3% were from 45 to 64; and 13.8% were 65 years of age or older. The gender makeup of the village was 51.8% male and 48.2% female.

=== 2000 census ===
As of the census of 2000, there were 885 people, 314 households, and 258 families living in the village. The population density was 885.2 inhabitants per square mile (341.8/km^{2}). There were 328 housing units at an average density of 328.1 per square mile (126.7/km^{2}). The racial makeup of the village was 98.53% White, 0.45% African American, 0.23% Native American, 0.23% from other races, and 0.56% from two or more races. Hispanic or Latino of any race were 0.23% of the population.

There were 314 households, out of which 41.4% had children under the age of 18 living with them, 69.4% were married couples living together, 10.2% had a female householder with no husband present, and 17.8% were non-families. 15.0% of all households were made up of individuals, and 6.7% had someone living alone who was 65 years of age or older. The average household size was 2.82 and the average family size was 3.10.

In the village, the population was spread out, with 27.7% under the age of 18, 9.3% from 18 to 24, 27.9% from 25 to 44, 24.7% from 45 to 64, and 10.4% who were 65 years of age or older. The median age was 37 years. For every 100 females there were 102.5 males. For every 100 females age 18 and over, there were 95.7 males.

The median income for a household in the village was $50,313, and the median income for a family was $53,438. Males had a median income of $39,048 versus $23,854 for females. The per capita income for the village was $20,679. About 3.9% of families and 4.4% of the population were below the poverty line, including 4.5% of those under age 18 and 5.0% of those age 65 or over.
