= Mahican-Mohawk Trail =

Hiking trail in Massachusetts, United States

- Length: 40 of projected 100 miles
- Location: Berkshire and Franklin counties, Massachusetts
- Trailheads: Deerfield, Massachusetts; North Adams, Massachusetts
- Use: Hiking, biking, snowmobiling, horseback riding, paddling
- Difficulty: Moderate to hard
- Season: Year round
- Sights: Forest, river

The Mahican-Mohawk Trail is a long-distance hiking trail that is under construction.

Originally a trail used by Native Americans, the Mahican-Mohawk Trail faded away as the automobile became popular and subsequently, the Mohawk Trail was constructed. In 1992, after some research by Williams College students, volunteers started to reclaim the trail.

There are currently multiple sections open in western Massachusetts, including one that follows the old New York, New Haven and Hartford Railroad grade. It is estimated that 40 miles (64 km) of trail are currently open. A large portion of the open trail is located in Mohawk Trail State Forest and South River State Forest.

Upon completion, the trail is projected to reach from the Connecticut River to the Hudson River.
