= Aaron River Reservoir =

Lake in Cohasset, Massachusetts, USA

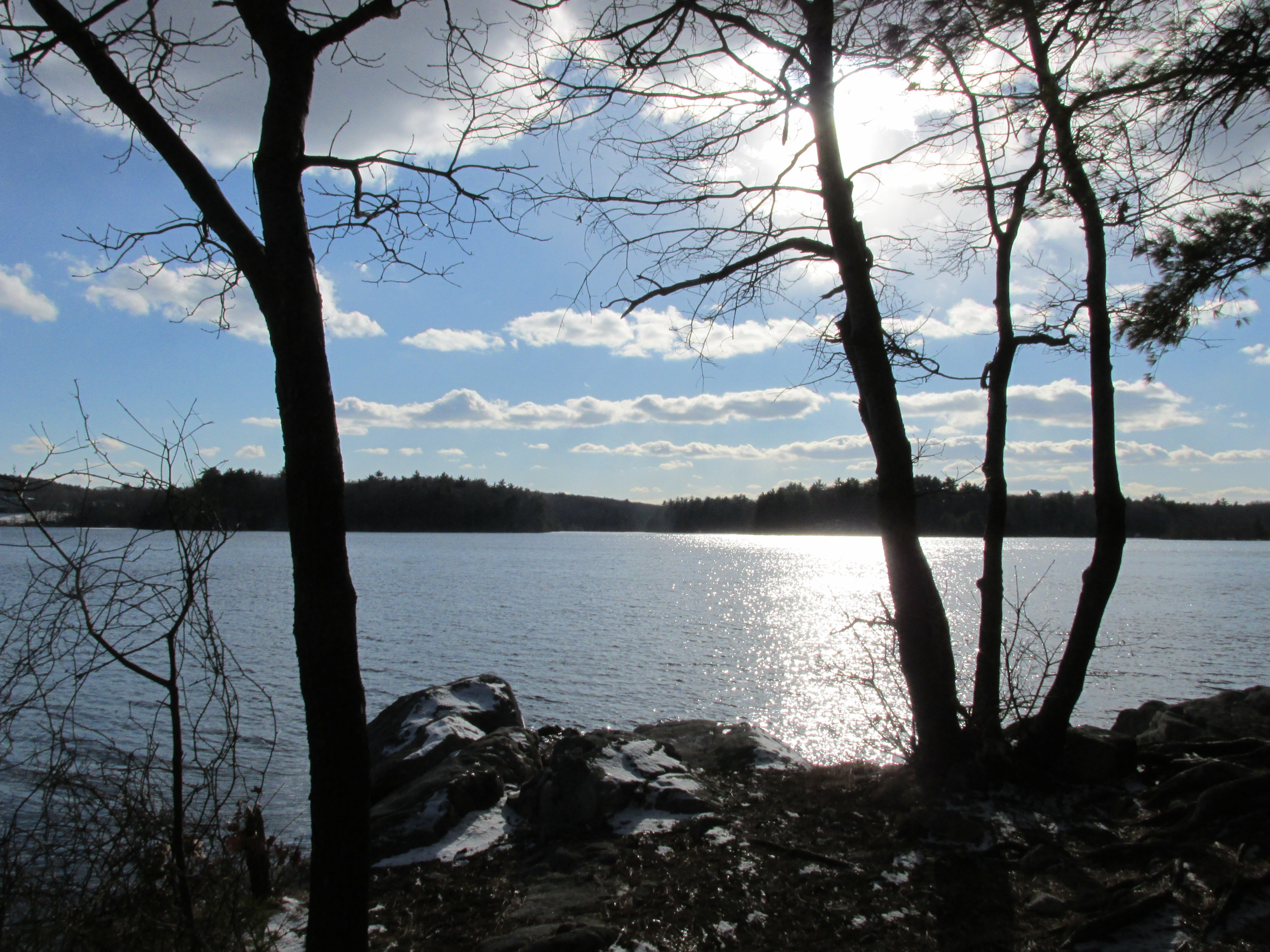
- Aaron River Reservoir

- Location within Massachusetts Location within the United States
- Location: Cohasset, Massachusetts
- Coordinates: 42°12′25″N 70°49′37″W
- Type: reservoir
- Primary outflows: Aaron River
- Basin countries: United States
- Surface area: 136 acres (0.55 km^{2})
- Surface elevation: 62 ft (19 m)
- Settlements: Beechwood

Aaron River Reservoir is a 136-acre (0.55 km^{2}) reservoir mostly in Cohasset, Massachusetts, with small stretches extending into Hingham and Scituate. The outflow of the pond is Aaron River. Most of the reservoir is in the eastern side of Wompatuck State Park. The village of Beechwood lies to the east of the reservoir. The reservoir is a Class A water supply source used as a backup source for the Town of Cohasset. The water quality is impaired due to mercury contamination, although the source of the mercury is unknown.
