= Wahconah Falls State Park =

Massachusetts state park

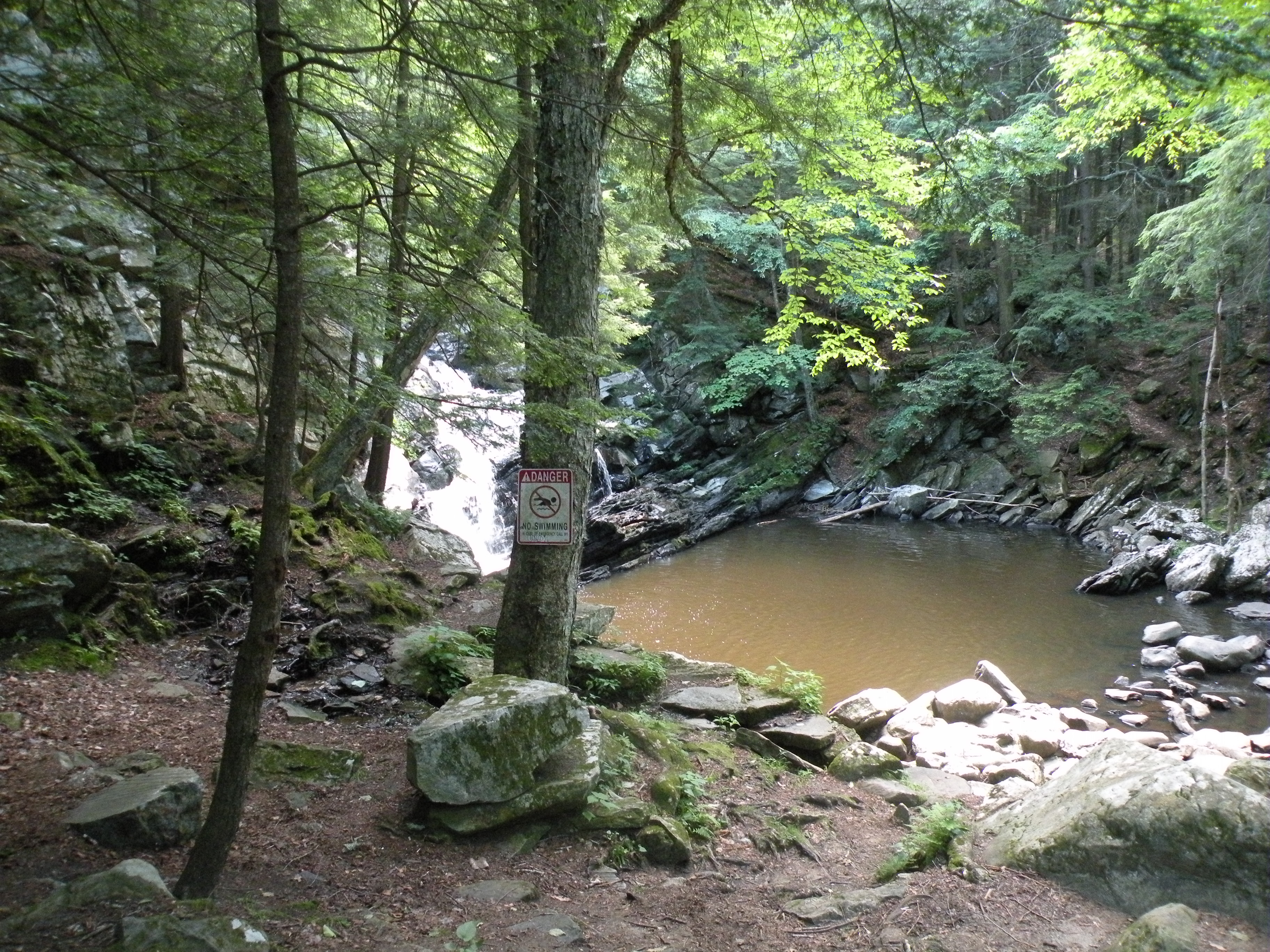

- Location within Massachusetts Location within the United States
- Location: Dalton, Massachusetts, United States
- Coordinates: 42°29′15″N 73°06′53″W
- Area: 48 acres (19 ha)
- Elevation: 1,319 ft (402 m)
- Administrator: Massachusetts Department of Conservation and Recreation
- Website: Official website

Wahconah Falls State Park is a small Massachusetts state park in the town of Dalton managed by the Department of Conservation and Recreation. The park protects the scenic waterfall for which it is named.

Wahconah Falls are created where Wahconah Falls Brook makes four individual drops, tumbling over an outcrop of the Becket Gneiss formation. The falls have been described as "rather photogenic" depending on time of year.

Visitors can hike, fish, and picnic. Swimming is not allowed, but wading is possible.
