= Camp Nihan =

Environmental education center in Massachusetts, US

Coordinates: 42.4925°N 71.0204°W

Camp Nihan is an environmental education center located in Saugus, Massachusetts, that is managed by the Department of Conservation and Recreation. Camp Nihan offers free environmental education programs for schools and nonprofit organizations. Its trails can be viewed on the map for Breakheart Reservation, although it remains a separate state park. It contains sixty five acres of woodland forest, marsh and a spring fed pond. The Saugus River flows through the camp property providing habitats for animals such as heron and mallards. A variety of mammals reside in and around the area, including fox, deer and river otter.

The camp was established in 1929 and named after George Nihan, Scout Executive for the Lynn Council Boy Scouts, who negotiated the purchase of the land for use as a Boy Scout camp. In the early 1970s, the property was purchased by the Metropolitan District Commission.
