= Sandisfield State Forest =

Protected area in Massachusetts, United States

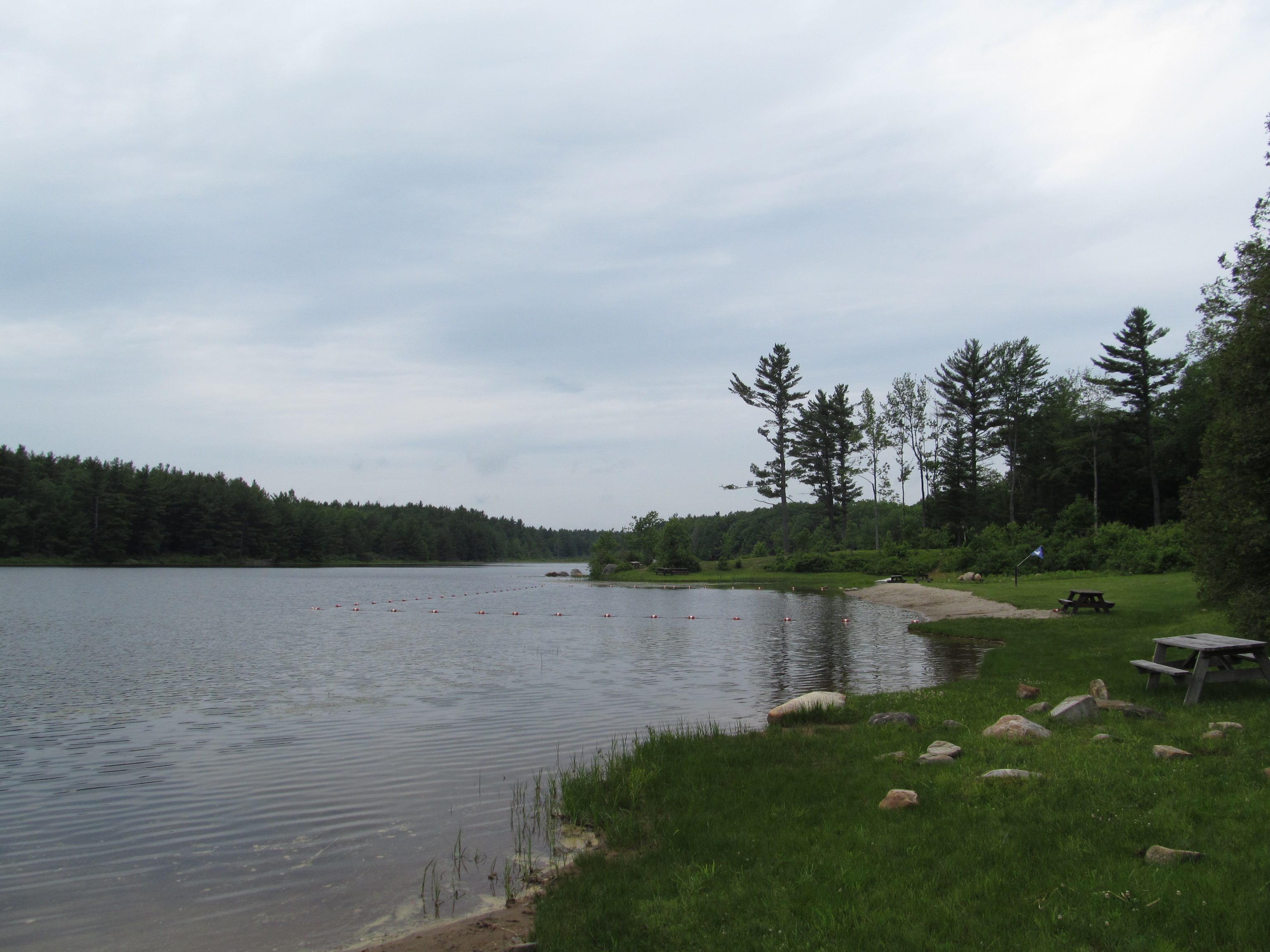
- York Lake

- Location within Massachusetts Location within the United States
- Location: Sandisfield, Massachusetts, United States
- Coordinates: 42°05′53″N 73°10′58″W
- Area: 4,190 acres (17.0 km^{2})
- Elevation: 1,542 ft (470 m)
- Established: 1922-26
- Administrator: Massachusetts Department of Conservation and Recreation
- Website: Official website

Sandisfield State Forest is a Massachusetts state forest filled with rolling hardwood forests in the town of Sandisfield. A highlight of the forest is York Lake, which was created from swampy ground by the Civilian Conservation Corps in 1935. It is managed by the Department of Conservation and Recreation.

== Activities and amenities ==
The shallow, 35-acre (14 ha), man-made York Lake offers a 300-foot (91 m) swimming beach, fishing, non-motorized boating, boat ramp, picnic grounds, and restrooms. The lake is stocked with trout three times each year. West and Abby lakes also have fishing. Trails available for hiking and cross-country skiing include the 2.2-mile (3.5 km) York Lake Loop Trail. The forest offers seasonal hunting. Black bears might be seen within the park.
