= Berkley State Forest =

Protected area in Massachusetts, United States

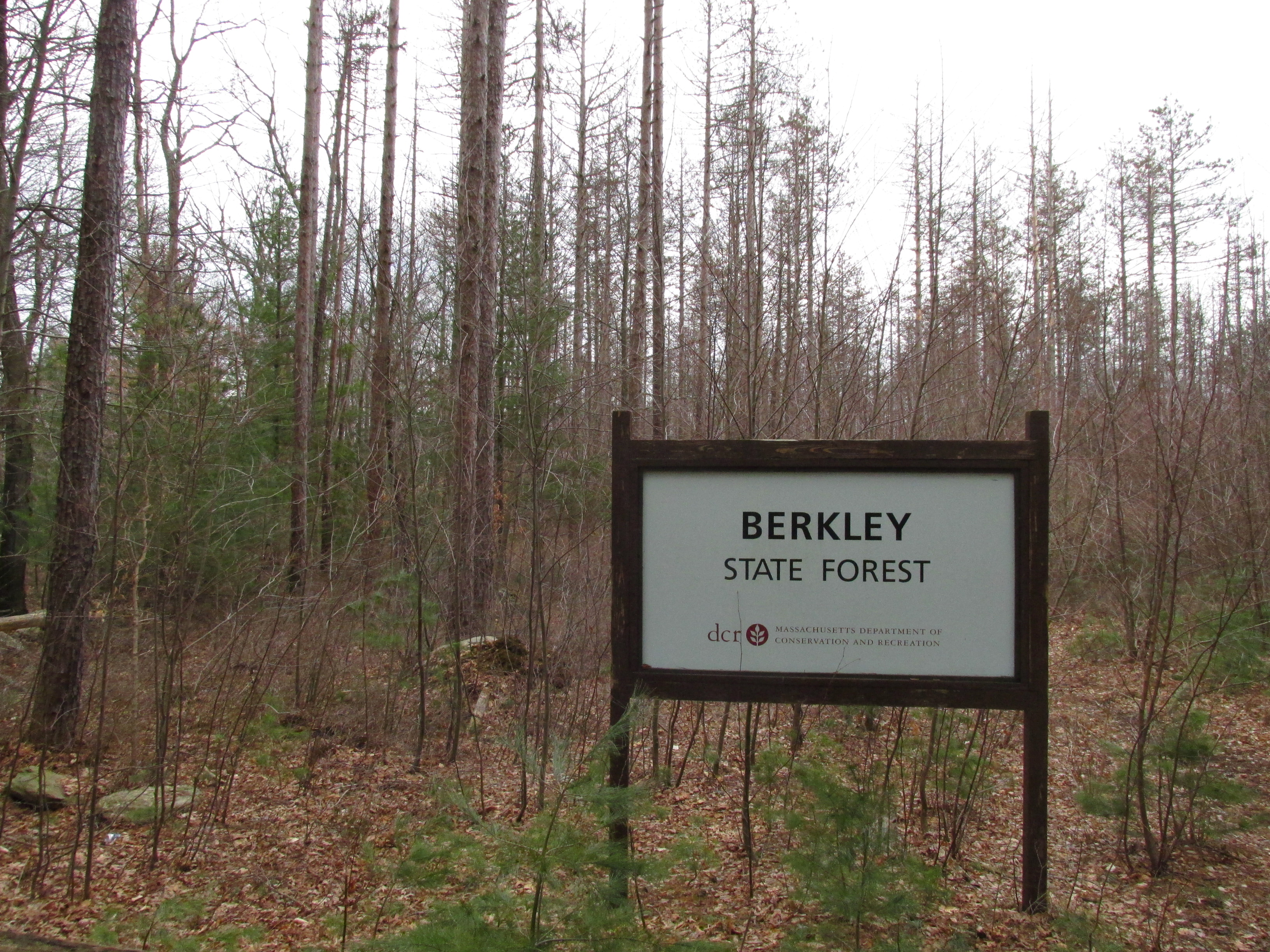
- Berkley State Forest, Berkley Massachusetts

- Location within Massachusetts
- Interactive map of Berkley State Forest

Geography
- Location: Bristol County, Massachusetts, United States
- Coordinates: 41.8263°N 71.0733°W
- Elevation: 79 ft (24 m)
- Area: 5.53 acres (0.0224 km^{2})

Administration
- Established: 1918
- Authority: Massachusetts Department of Conservation and Recreation

The Berkley State Forest is a small tract of forest land located near Route 24 in Berkley, Massachusetts in Dighton Rock State Park. It is owned by the Commonwealth of Massachusetts and operated by the Department of Conservation and Recreation.
