= Sandisfield, Massachusetts =

- Town
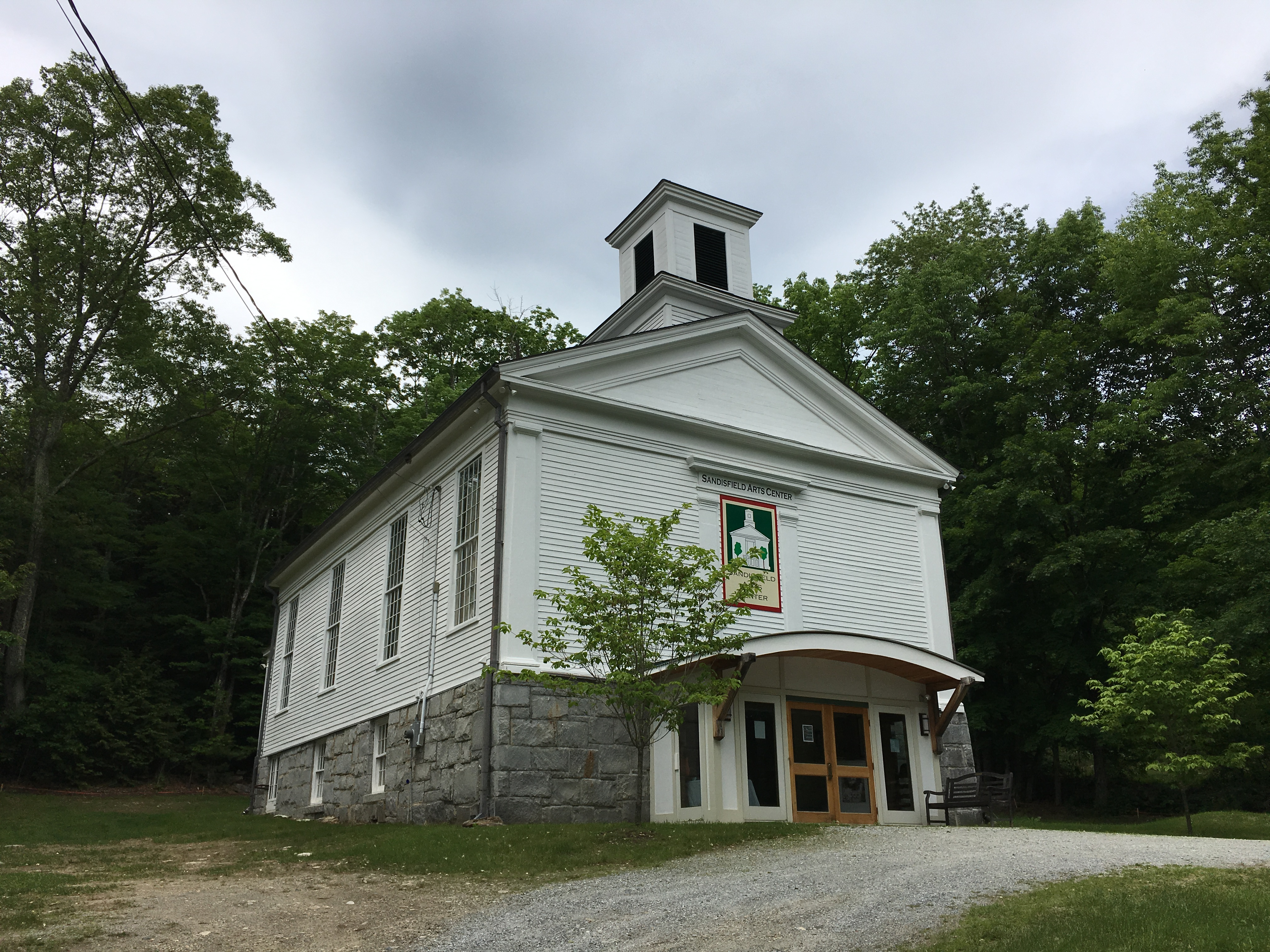
- The Sandisfield Arts Center

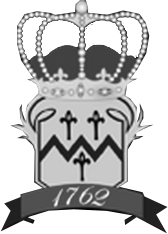
- Seal

- Location in Berkshire County and the state of Massachusetts.
- Coordinates: 42°06′45″N 73°08′37″W
- Country: United States
- State: Massachusetts
- County: Berkshire
- Settled: 1750
- Incorporated: 1762

Government
  - Type: Open town meeting

Area
  - Total: 53.0 sq mi (137.2 km^{2})
  - Land: 51.8 sq mi (134.2 km^{2})
  - Water: 1.2 sq mi (3.0 km^{2})
- Elevation: 1,578 ft (481 m)

Population (2020)
  - Total: 989
  - Density: 19.1/sq mi (7.37/km^{2})
- Time zone: UTC-5 (Eastern)
  - Summer (DST): UTC-4 (Eastern)
- ZIP Code: 01255
- Area code: 413
- FIPS code: 25-59665
- GNIS feature ID: 0619426
- Website: www.sandisfieldma.gov

Sandisfield is a town in Berkshire County, Massachusetts, United States. It is part of the Pittsfield Metropolitan Statistical Area. The population was 989 at the 2020 census.

== History ==
Sandisfield was first settled in 1750 as Housatonic Township Number 4, and was officially incorporated in 1762. It was most likely named to honor Lord Sandys, a British colonial official—pronounced "Sands". The town was mostly agricultural, with rye fields and orchards filling the land. There were several sawmills built along the rivers, but most industry failed in the late nineteenth century when a planned railway along the Farmington River fell through. Significant numbers of Ukrainian farmers moved in during the late nineteenth century, many of them running chicken farms.

The Record was published from 1981 to 1985 and The Newsletter for a decade during the 1990s. The volunteer-run Sandisfield Times has been published 11 times a year since 2009. Today the town is mostly rural, and one of the least densely populated parts of the state.

== Geography ==
According to the United States Census Bureau, the town has a total area of 53.0 square miles (137.2 km^{2}), of which 51.8 square miles (134.2 km^{2}) is land and 1.2 square miles (3.0 km^{2}), or 2.22%, is water. The town is the largest by land area in Berkshire County, and eighth largest in the state. Sandisfield lies at the southeast corner of Berkshire County along the Connecticut border, with Hampden County to the east and Litchfield County, Connecticut, to the south. Sandisfield is bordered by Otis to the north and northeast, Tolland to the east, Colebrook and Norfolk, Connecticut, to the south, New Marlborough to the west, and Monterey to the northwest. Sandisfield lies 28 miles (45 km) south-southeast of Pittsfield, 32 miles (51 km) west of Springfield, and 118 miles (190 km) west-southwest of Boston.

Sandisfield lies in the southeastern part of the Berkshire Mountains, along the western banks of the Farmington River. The town is on a plateau, with the Buck and Clam rivers flowing through town towards the Farmington, as well as several small, marshy brooks and small ponds and lakes. The town is dotted by pieces of the Sandisfield State Forest, with the highest point in town, Abbey Hill (1,810 ft or 550 m) lying in the northwest section of the forest. A small portion of Otis State Forest also crosses the northern border of town.

The town lies along Massachusetts Route 8, which passes along the banks of the Farmington River on the eastern part of town. Route 57 crosses through the center of town from west to east, crossing the river into Tolland at the village of New Boston. Route 183 passes through the southwest corner of town, crossing into Connecticut to become Connecticut Highway 183. The nearest interstate, Interstate 90 (the Massachusetts Turnpike) passes north of the town through Otis, with the nearest access being in Lee and Westfield.

There is no rail service in town, with the nearest rail and bus service being in Great Barrington. The nearest local airport is in Great Barrington, and the nearest national air service can be found at Bradley International Airport in Windsor Locks, Connecticut.

== Demographics ==
Historical population
Year	Pop.	±%
1776	1,044	—
1790	1,581	+51.4%
1800	1,637	+3.5%
1810	1,648	+0.7%
1820	1,646	−0.1%
1830	1,655	+0.5%
1840	1,464	−11.5%
1850	1,649	+12.6%
1860	1,585	−3.9%
1870	1,482	−6.5%
1880	1,107	−25.3%
1890	807	−27.1%
1900	661	−18.1%
1910	566	−14.4%
1920	460	−18.7%
1930	412	−10.4%
1940	421	+2.2%
1950	437	+3.8%
1960	536	+22.7%
1970	547	+2.1%
1980	720	+31.6%
1990	667	−7.4%
2000	824	+23.5%
2010	915	+11.0%
2020	989	+8.1%
2022*	982	−0.7%
* = population estimate. Source: United States census records and Population Estimates Program data.

As of the census of 2010, there were 915 people, 327 households, and 212 families residing in the town. By population, Sandisfield ranks 23rd out of the 32 cities and towns in Berkshire, and 330th out of the 351 cities and towns in Massachusetts. The population density was 15.7 people per square mile (6.1/km^{2}), which rank third to last in the county, and eighth to last in the Commonwealth. There were 647 housing units at an average density of 12.4 per square mile (4.8/km^{2}). The racial makeup of the town was 96.84% White, 0.49% African American, 0.12% Native American, 0.12% Asian, 0.36% from other races, and 2.06% from two or more races. Hispanic or Latino of any race were 0.97% of the population.

There were 327 households, out of which 24.8% had children under the age of 18 living with them, 58.4% were married couples living together, 4.0% had a female householder with no husband present, and 34.9% were non-families. 30.0% of all households were made up of individuals, and 11.9% had someone living alone who was 65 years of age or older. The average household size was 2.37 and the average family size was 2.99.

In the town, the population was spread out, with 20.1% under the age of 18, 4.1% from 18 to 24, 26.1% from 25 to 44, 31.7% from 45 to 64, and 18.0% who were 65 years of age or older. The median age was 45 years. For every 100 females, there were 115.7 males. For every 100 females age 18 and over, there were 117.9 males.

The median income for a household in the town was $45,972, and the median income for a family was $57,083. Males had a median income of $36,875 versus $24,271 for females. The per capita income for the town was $27,628. About 1.3% of families and 2.4% of the population were below the poverty line, including none of those under age 18 and 3.5% of those age 65 or over.

== Government ==
Sandisfield employs the open town meeting form of government, and is led by a board of selectmen. The town has its own small police station, as well as a post office and two volunteer fire stations (in New Boston and west of the town center). The town's library is connected to the regional library systems. The nearest hospitals are in Great Barrington and Westfield.

On the state level, Sandisfield is represented in the Massachusetts House of Representatives by the Fourth Berkshire district, which covers southern Berkshire County, as well as the westernmost towns in Hampden County. In the Massachusetts Senate, the town is represented by the Berkshire, Hampshire and Franklin district, which includes all of Berkshire County and western Hampshire and Franklin counties. The town is patrolled by the Sandisfield Police Department as well as First (Lee) Station of Barracks "B" of the Massachusetts State Police.

On the national level, Sandisfield is represented in the United States House of Representatives as part of Massachusetts's 1st congressional district, and has been represented by Richard Neal of Springfield since January 2013. Massachusetts is currently represented in the United States Senate by senior Senator Elizabeth Warren and junior Senator Ed Markey.

== Education ==
Sandisfield, along with neighboring Otis, is part of the Farmington River Regional School District. Until 1998, the town ran its own school, but budget cuts closed it. The district's only school, Farmington River Elementary School, is in Otis, and houses students from pre-kindergarten through sixth grades. For the upper grades, most students attend W.E.B. DuBois Regional Middle School, Monument Mountain Regional High School in Great Barrington, Lee High School, and Mt. Everett Regional High School in Sheffield. The nearest private schools are in Great Barrington, Lee and Westfield.

The nearest community college is Berkshire Community College in Pittsfield and Sheffield. The nearest state college is Westfield State University. The nearest private colleges are Elms College in Chicopee, Bay Path University in Longmeadow, Smith College in Northampton, and American International College, Springfield College, and Western New England University, all located in Springfield. University of Saint Joseph and University of Hartford, both located in West Hartford, Connecticut, are also located within an hour's drive.

== Notable people ==
- Mary Sears McHenry (1834–1912), president of the Women's Relief Corps in 1890, which at the time was the largest fraternal association in the United States
- Simon Winchester (1944–2026), British author and journalist
- James Worden (1819–1884), Justice of the Indiana Supreme Court, mayor of Fort Wayne, Indiana
