= Tolland, Massachusetts =

- Town
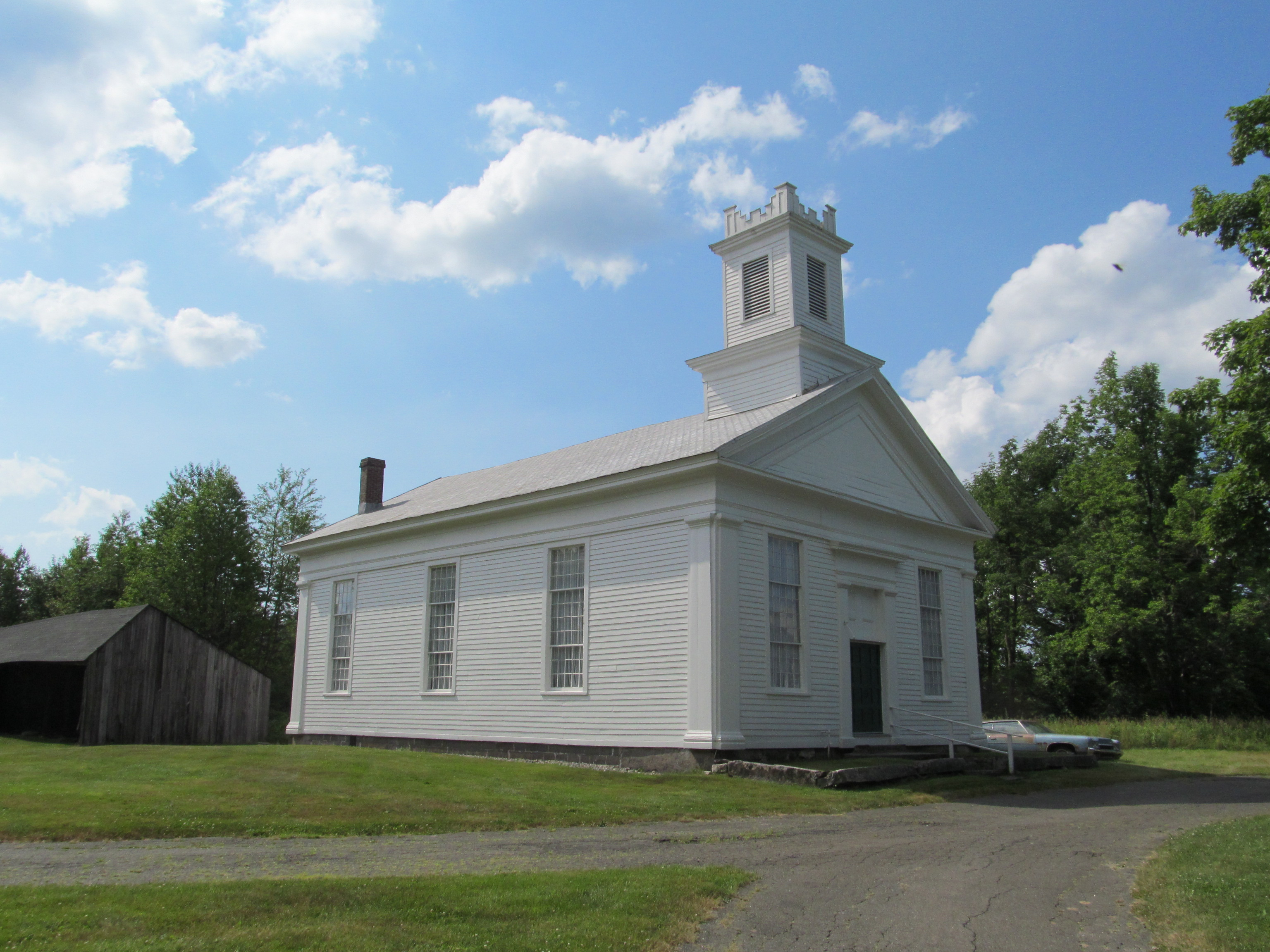
- Congregational Church

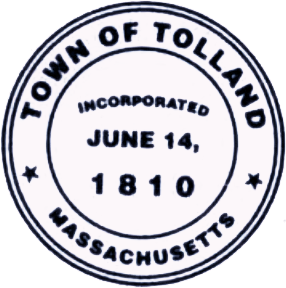
- Seal

- Location in Hampden County in Massachusetts
- Coordinates: 42°04′52″N 73°00′45″W
- Country: United States
- State: Massachusetts
- County: Hampden
- Settled: 1750
- Incorporated: 1810

Government
  - Type: Open town meeting

Area
  - Total: 32.8 sq mi (84.9 km^{2})
  - Land: 31.5 sq mi (81.7 km^{2})
  - Water: 1.2 sq mi (3.2 km^{2})
- Elevation: 1,519 ft (463 m)

Population (2020)
  - Total: 471
  - Density: 14.9/sq mi (5.76/km^{2})
- Time zone: UTC−5 (Eastern)
  - Summer (DST): UTC−4 (Eastern)
- ZIP Codes: 01034 (Tolland); 01008 (Blandford)
- Area code: 413
- FIPS code: 25-70045
- GNIS feature ID: 0618192
- Website: www.tolland-ma.gov

Tolland is a town in Hampden County, Massachusetts, United States. It is part of the Springfield, Massachusetts Metropolitan Statistical Area. The population was 471 at the 2020 census, making it the smallest town in Hampden County by population.

== History ==
Tolland was first settled in 1750 when it was part of neighboring Granville. Tolland was officially incorporated in 1810.

== Geography ==
Tolland occupies the southwestern corner of Hampden County and is bordered on the north by Otis and Blandford, on the east by Granville, on the south by Hartland and Colebrook, Connecticut, and on the west by Sandisfield. Massachusetts Route 57 crosses the center of the town, leading east to Agawam and west New Marlborough. The West Branch of the Farmington River forms most of the western boundary of the town. The southern end of Otis Reservoir is in the northern part of town. The eastern part of town is drained by tributaries of the Hubbard River, which flows southeast to the East Branch of the Farmington River. The northeast corner of the town is drained by Ripley Brook, which flows east via the Little River to the Westfield River. The entire town is part of the Connecticut River watershed.

According to the U.S. Census Bureau, the town has a total area of 32.8 square miles (84.9 km^{2}), of which 31.5 square miles (81.7 km^{2}) are land and 1.2 square miles (3.2 km^{2}), or 3.77%, are water.

Tolland State Forest and Granville State Forest protect a part of the town's area.

== Demographics ==
Historical population
| Year | Pop. | ±% |
|---|---|---|
| 1850 | 594 | — |
| 1860 | 596 | +0.3% |
| 1870 | 509 | −14.6% |
| 1880 | 452 | −11.2% |
| 1890 | 393 | −13.1% |
| 1900 | 275 | −30.0% |
| 1910 | 180 | −34.5% |
| 1920 | 192 | +6.7% |
| 1930 | 134 | −30.2% |
| 1940 | 129 | −3.7% |
| 1950 | 107 | −17.1% |
| 1960 | 101 | −5.6% |
| 1970 | 172 | +70.3% |
| 1980 | 235 | +36.6% |
| 1990 | 289 | +23.0% |
| 2000 | 426 | +47.4% |
| 2010 | 485 | +13.8% |
| 2020 | 471 | −2.9% |
| 2024* | 474 | +0.6% |
* = population estimate. Source: United States census records and Population Estimates Program data.

As of the census of 2000, there were 426 people, 169 households, and 114 families residing in the town. The population density was 13.5 people per square mile (5.2/km^{2}). There were 478 housing units at an average density of 15.1 per square mile (5.8/km^{2}). The racial makeup of the town was 97.42% White, 0.94% African American, 1.17% Native American, 0.23% Asian, and 0.23% from two or more races. Hispanic or Latino of any race were 1.17% of the population.

There were 169 households, out of which 26.6% had children under the age of 18 living with them, 66.3% were married couples living together, 1.2% had a female householder with no husband present, and 32.0% were non-families. Of all households 28.4% were made up of individuals, and 13.0% had someone living alone who was 65 years of age or older. The average household size was 2.52 and the average family size was 3.06.

In the town, the population was spread out, with 23.9% under the age of 18, 3.3% from 18 to 24, 31.0% from 25 to 44, 28.9% from 45 to 64, and 12.9% who were 65 years of age or older. The median age was 41 years. For every 100 females, there were 114.1 males. For every 100 females age 18 and over, there were 118.9 males.

The median income for a household in the town was $53,125, and the median income for a family was $65,417. Males had a median income of $41,094 versus $35,278 for females. The per capita income for the town was $30,126. About 2.3% of families and 4.2% of the population were below the poverty line, including none of those under age 18 and 17.7% of those age 65 or over.

== Education ==
Tolland is part of the Southwick-Tolland-Granville Regional School District, along with Granville, and Southwick. Students attend Woodland School from K–2, and Powder Mill School from 3–6. High School students attend Southwick Regional School from 7–12.

== Library ==
The Tolland Public Library was established in 1892. In fiscal year 2008, the town of Tolland spent 0.97% ($10,271) of its budget on its public library—approximately $22 per person, per year ($28.99 adjusted for inflation to 2022).

== Notable person ==
- John Easton Mills (1796–1847), fifth Mayor of Montréal, Canada (1846–1847)
