= Little Pond =

Little Pond may refer to:

- Little Pond (Massachusetts), a lake in Massachusetts
- Little Pond (Delaware County, New York), a lake in New York
- Little Pond (Orange County, New York), a lake in New York
- Little Pond, Nova Scotia, a community in Canada
- Little Pond, Prince Edward Island, a community in Canada

== See also ==
- A Little Pond, a South Korean film
