= Big Pond =

Big pond may refer to:

- Big Pond (Massachusetts), a lake in Massachusetts
- Big Pond (Orange County, New York), a lake in New York
- Big Pond, Nova Scotia, a Canadian township
  - Big Pond (Nova Scotia), the lake after which the township is named
- Big Pond, Pennsylvania, an unincorporated village in Bradford County, USA
- BigPond, an Australian Internet service provider
- The Big Pond, a 1930s romantic comedy film
- Big Pond (Middle Caicos, Turks and Caicos Islands), a lake in Middle Caicos
