= Hubbard River =

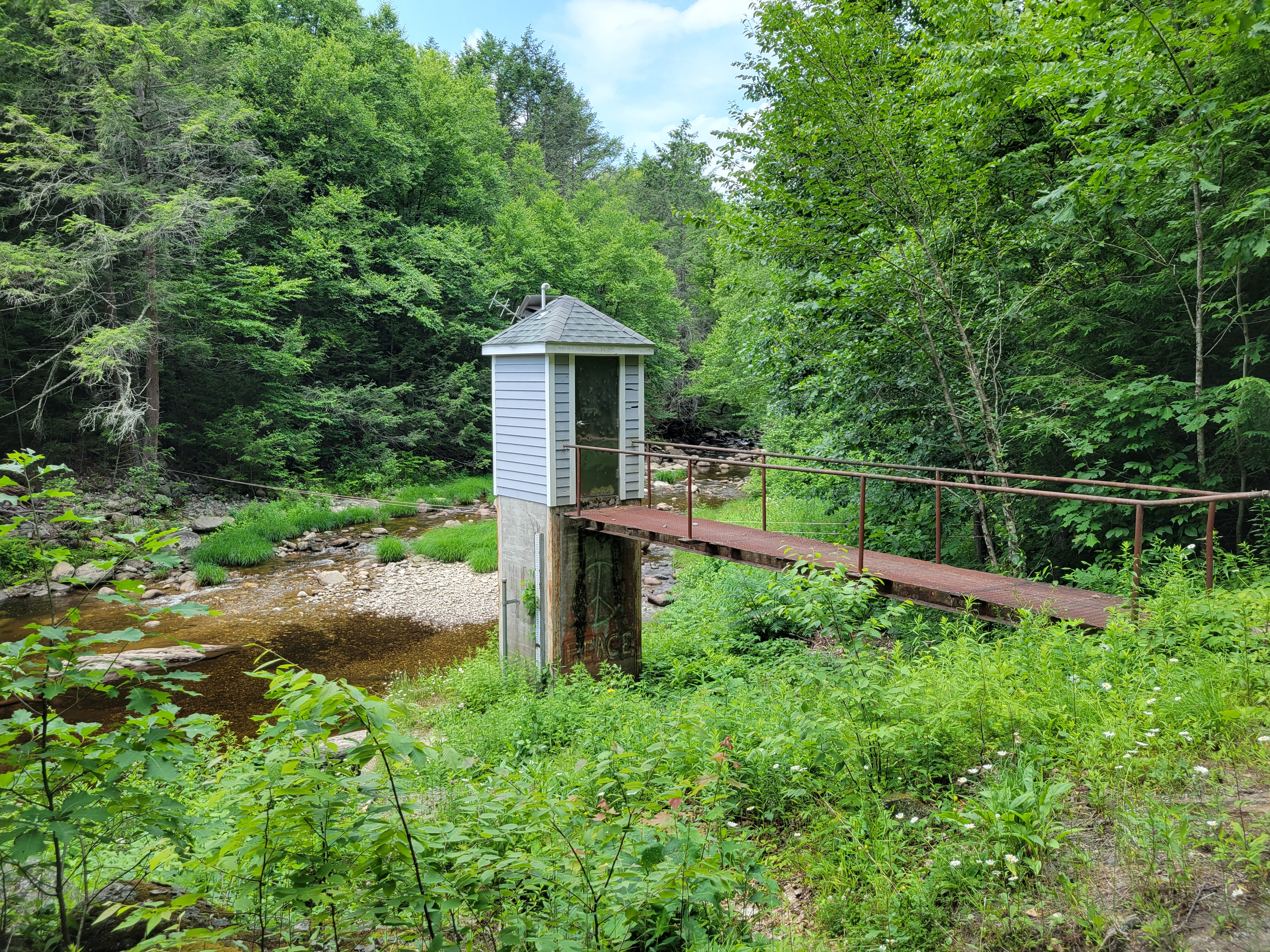
- Hubbard River

Location
- Country: United States

Physical characteristics
- Source
  - location: Junction of Babcock Brook and Hall Pond Brook Tolland, Massachusetts
  - coordinates: 42.0816°N 72.9737°W
- Mouth
  - location: Barkhamsted Reservoir, Hartland, CT
  - coordinates: 42.0292°N 72.9356°W
  - elevation: 528 feet (161 m)
- Length: 4.6 mi (7.4 km)

Basin features
- References: U.S. Geological Survey Geographic Names Information System: Hubbard River

The Hubbard River, 4.6 miles (7.4 km) long, is part of the Farmington River watershed. It flows through Connecticut and Massachusetts.

The river is a main feature of Massachusetts's Granville State Forest where it drops 450 feet (140 m) in 2.5 miles (4.0 km). It is named for Samuel Hubbard, the English colonist who came to the area, operating a saw mill near the river in 1749. The river heads in Tolland, Massachusetts, at the junction of Babcock Brook and Hall Pond Brook, then flows southeast across Granville, Massachusetts to Barkhamsted Reservoir in the town of Hartland, Connecticut.

== Tributaries ==
- Babcock Brook, Hall Pond Brook, Halfway Brook and Pond Brook

== See also ==
- List of rivers of Connecticut
