= Tunxis Forest Ski Cabin =

- U.S. National Register of Historic Places
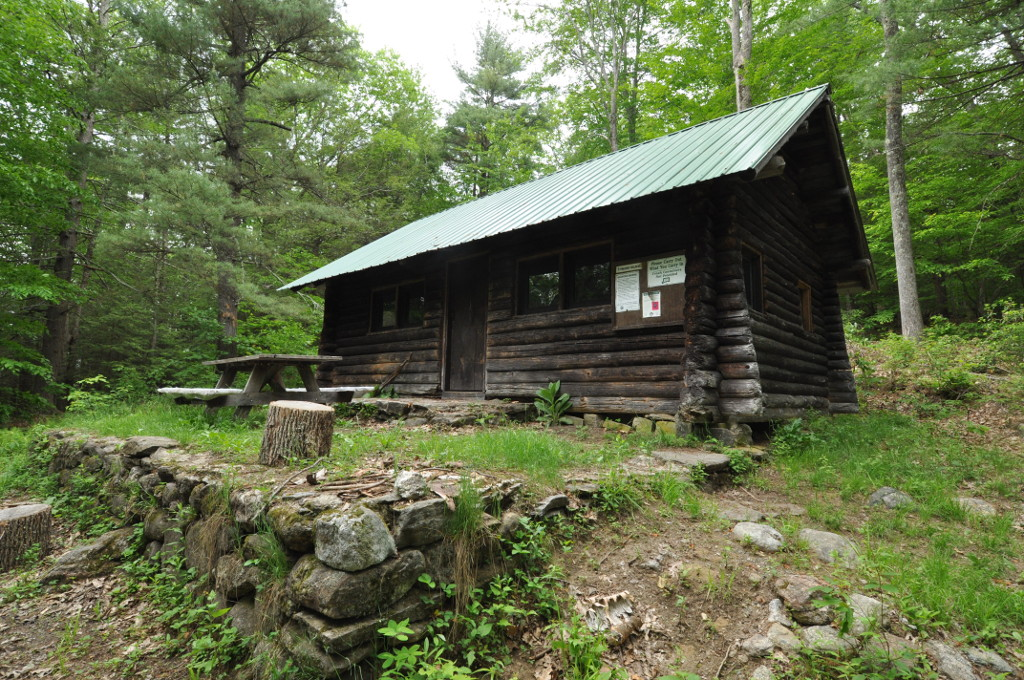

- Location within Connecticut Location within the United States
- Location: Western End of Balance Rock Road, Hartland, Connecticut
- Coordinates: 42°0′32″N 72°55′47″W
- Area: 6.5 acres (2.6 ha)
- Built: 1937
- Built by: Civilian Conservation Corps
- Architectural style: Rustic-log cabin
- MPS: Connecticut State Park and Forest Depression-Era Federal Work Relief Programs Structures TR
- NRHP reference No.: 86001761
- Added to NRHP: September 5, 1986

The Tunxis Forest Ski Cabin is a historic ski lodge at the end of Balance Rock Road in Tunxis State Forest, Hartland, Connecticut. Built in 1937, it is one of the few surviving ski-related recreational structures built by the Civilian Conservation Corps in the state. It was listed on the National Register of Historic Places in 1986.

== Description and history ==
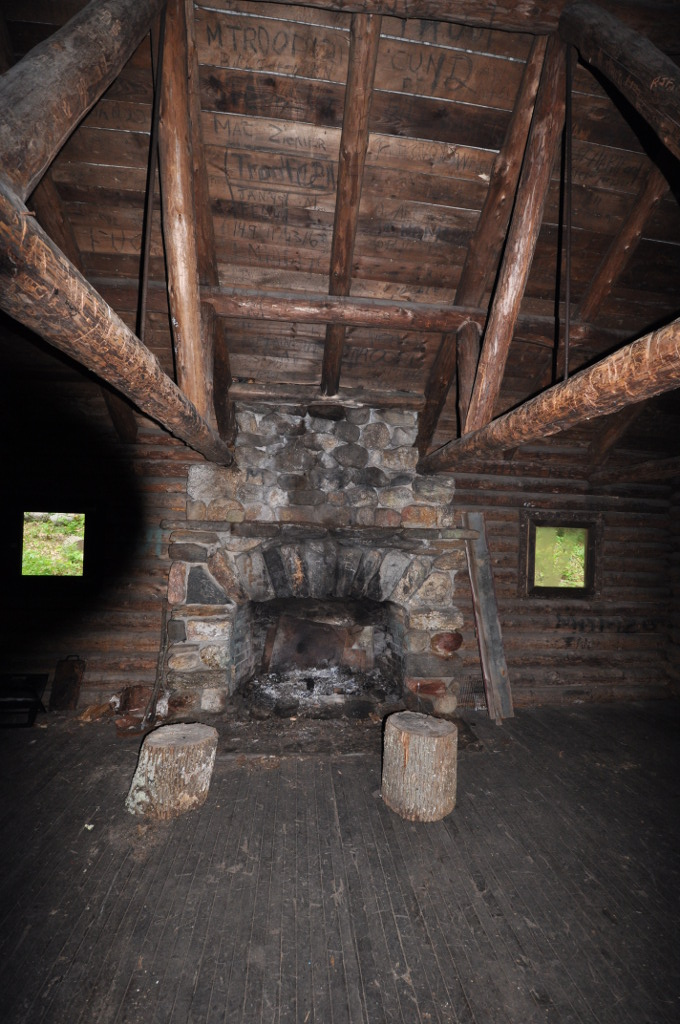
Stone fireplace

The Tunxis Forest Ski Cabin is located in the eastern unit of Tunxis State Forest, a short hike off the western end of Balance Rock Road. It is a single-story log structure, with a gabled roof and massive fieldstone chimney. Its logs are laid with dovetailed corners, each level slightly smaller than that below it. The front facade is three bays wide, with an entrance flanked by paired square windows. The side walls each have two square windows set in individual openings. The roof is built with an extended overhang, its trusses exposed both outside and inside.

The cabin was built as the base lodge of a ski area that the CCC crews of nearby Camp Robinson built in 1937. As part of this work the CCC also built Balance Rock Road, where culverts and retaining walls also still survive. The CCC also built a ski area in Mohawk State Forest, which later became the site of Mohawk Ski Area. The ski cabin served a novice trail, since overgrown, and an expert trail of which only the upper portion still remains. It is believed to be one of the oldest surviving artifacts related to downhill skiing in the state.

== See also ==
- National Register of Historic Places listings in Hartford County, Connecticut
