= Otis Center Historic District =

Historic district in Massachusetts, United States

- U.S. National Register of Historic Places
- U.S. Historic district
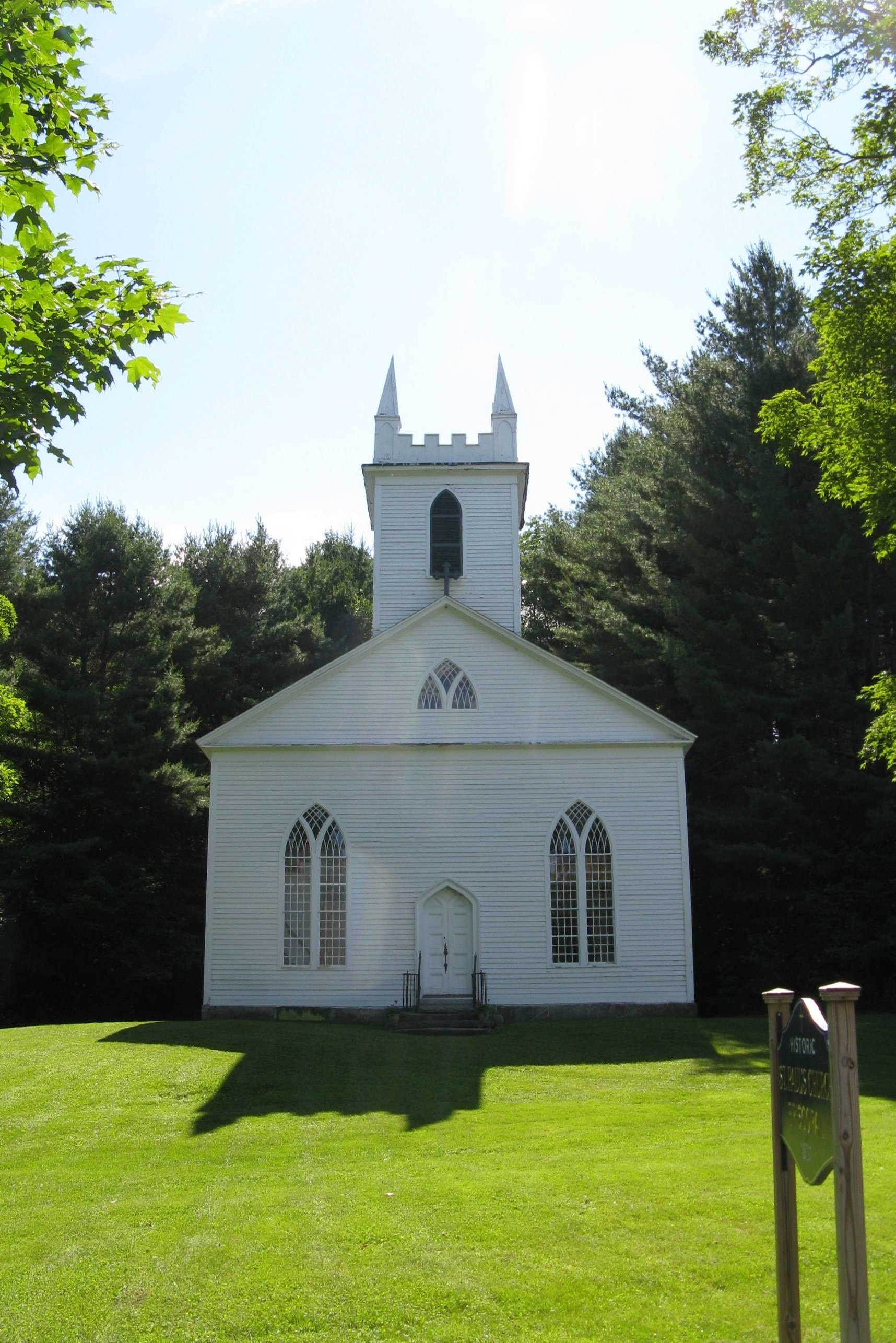
- St. Paul's Church

- Location within Massachusetts Location within the United States
- Location: 11-29 East Otis, 12-41 Monterey, 14-144 North Main, 8-120 South Main, 25 & 37 Witter Rds., Otis, Massachusetts
- Coordinates: 42°11′35″N 73°5′31″W
- Area: 111 acres (45 ha)
- Built: 1777
- Architectural style: Federal, Greek Revival, Italianate, Queen Anne, Colonial Revival
- NRHP reference No.: 100007553
- Added to NRHP: April 7, 2022

Otis Center Historic District is a historic district encompassing the historic village of Otis Center in the Berkshire hill town of Otis, Massachusetts. The village began as a crossroads settlement in the 18th century, and has served as the town's civic center since its incorporation. It features a diversity of architectural styles from the late 18th century to the early 20th. It was listed on the National Register of Historic Places in 2022.

== Description and history ==
Otis Center is located near the town's geographic center, at the junction of Main Road and East Otis Road, portions of both forming part of Massachusetts Route 23, a major east–west road through the region, and Massachusetts Route 8, a north–south artery. The village consists of a cluster of civic, religious, commercial, and residential buildings roughly bounded on the east by the West Branch Farmington River. St. Paul's Church, a fine Gothic Revival building, anchors the northern end of the district, with its oldest feature, the c. 1777 cemetery, just to its southwest across Monterey Road. other prominent buildings include the 1814 Otis Congregational Church, a fine example of Federal period church architecture, and the 1949 Colonial Revival library and museum.

The area that became Otis was laid out in a series of colonial land grants in the first half of the 18th century. The crossroad village at its center was first known as Bethlehem, and was combined with the neighboring town of Louden to form the town of Otis (named for politician Harrison Gray Otis) in 1810. The village's central location and location along a major east–west roadway across the Berkshires ensured its prosperity as a modest farming community. Its early growth was also helped by industry powered by the waters of the West Branch Farmington River. In the mid-19th century the community began to see modest declines, as farmers left the region for better lands out west, and it failed to secure a railroad connection for its industries.

== See also ==
- National Register of Historic Places listings in Berkshire County, Massachusetts
