= Camp Nawaka =

Residential summer camp in Massachusetts, US

Coordinates: 42.1665°N 73.0598°W

Camp Nawaka was a non-profit co-ed residential summer camp located in the Berkshires, East Otis, Massachusetts. The property was formerly a boys' swimming camp known as Camp Aquatic, which operated during the 1940s and closed in the mid-1950s. Nawaka opened in 1967 and closed following the summer of 2009. Nawaka offered sessions for children between the ages of 8 and 16. The camp was owned and run by Camp Fire. It was a small camp of approximately 40 staff members and up to 120 campers, the last director was Nicole, and some of the last counselors included Andrew, AJ, Mike, Pam, and Brian (Dukie). The camp centered on its own 16-acre (65,000 m^{2}) private pond, Larkum Pond. The camp ran from the end of June until the end of August. The last session was called color week where the camp was split into two competing teams, this week was often the most popular. The facility was available to rent during late spring and early fall. Campers aged 13–15 were able to sign up for the "Senior Camp" program, where they slept in tents and often traveled outside of the camp. Another option was "Adventure Camp," where campers slept in cabins or dorms (for younger campers.) Nawaka campers developed a strong attachment, returned for multiple years, and remained active as adult alumni.
