= Tolland State Forest =

Publicly-owned forest in Massachusetts

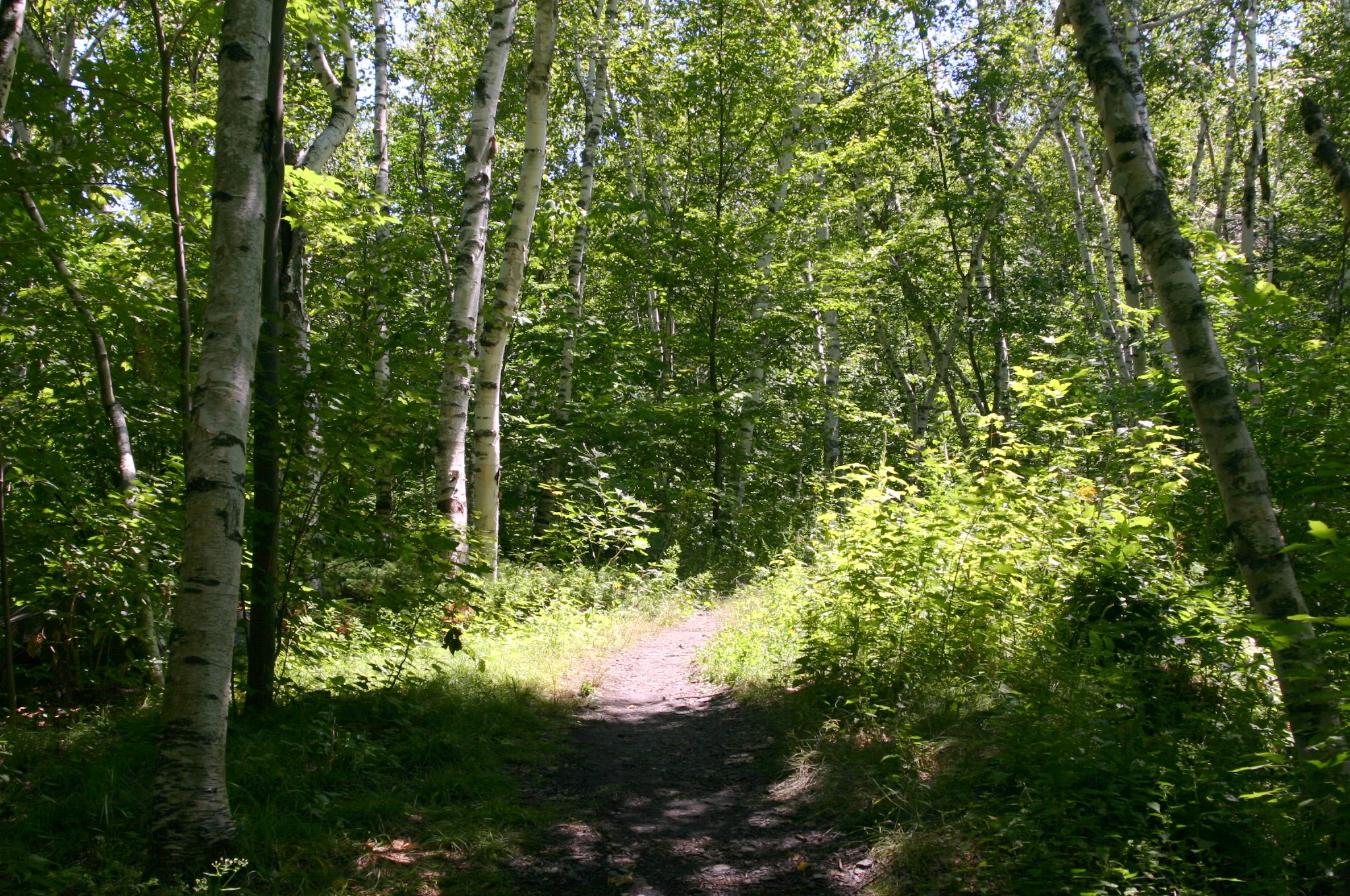
- Tolland State Forest, August 2007

- Location within Massachusetts Location within the United States
- Location: Otis, Tolland, Blandford and Sandisfield, Massachusetts, United States
- Coordinates: 42°09′04″N 73°02′27″W
- Area: 4,415 acres (17.87 km^{2})
- Elevation: 1,414 ft (431 m)
- Established: 1925
- Administrator: Massachusetts Department of Conservation and Recreation
- Website: Official website

Tolland State Forest is a publicly owned forest with recreational features covering 4,415 acres (1,787 ha) in the towns of Otis, Tolland, Blandford and Sandisfield in the southern Berkshire Hills of Massachusetts. The state forest centers on the 1,065-acre (431 ha) Otis Reservoir, the largest body of water for recreational use in western Massachusetts. The forest is managed by the Department of Conservation and Recreation.

== History ==
The state forest was created with the state's purchase of cut-over lumber lands in 1925. A Civilian Conservation Corps camp opened here in 1933. The Corps created the day-use and camping areas on the peninsula that extends into Otis Reservoir. In 1966, the state expanded the forest through the purchase of the reservoir and surrounding lands.

== Activities and amenities ==
Forest trails are available for hiking, mountain biking, off-road vehicles, and cross-country skiing. The campground includes sites for tents and RVs. The day-use area offers swimming, picnicking, and a boat ramp. The reservoir is stocked in spring and fall with trout by the Massachusetts Division of Fisheries & Wildlife. The forest also offers educational programs and restricted hunting.
