= Tunxis Forest Headquarters House =

Historic house in Connecticut, United States

- U.S. National Register of Historic Places
- Location within Connecticut Location within the United States
- Location: North Hollow Road, (CT 20) Hartland, Connecticut
- Coordinates: 42°0′51″N 72°54′58″W
- Area: 6.5 acres (2.6 ha)
- Built: 1936
- Built by: Civilian Conservation Corps
- MPS: Connecticut State Park and Forest Depression-Era Federal Work Relief Programs Structures TR
- NRHP reference No.: 86001759
- Added to NRHP: September 4, 1986

The Tunxis Forest Headquarters House is a historic house on North Hollow Road Connecticut Route 20) in Hartland, Connecticut. Built in 1936, it is one of the few surviving houses built in the state by the Civilian Conservation Corps, and now serves as part of the headquarters complex of Tunxis State Forest. It was listed on the National Register of Historic Places in 1986.

== Description and history ==
The Tunxis Forest Headquarters House is located on the west side of North Hollow Road, about 0.3 miles (0.48 km) north of its Junction with Old Town Road. It is set among a cluster of other buildings that make up the forest headquarters. It is a 1 1/2-story timber-frame structure, measuring about 40 by 20 feet (12.2 m × 6.1 m), with a gabled roof. Its end walls are built out of fieldstone laid in random courses, with fireplaces and chimneys built into them. Its exterior is otherwise finished in wooden shingles. The interior, as originally built, was fitted with a living room and kitchen on the ground floor, and three small bedrooms and a bathroom on the upper level.

The house was built in 1936 by a crew of the Civilian Conservation Corps (CCC), and was constructed to serve as the principal administration building of the CCC camp. After the CCC program ended, the house was used by the local forester as a residence until 1948. It continued to be used as a residence until 1974, and after a period of vacancy was adapted by the state for use in an educational program for troubled youth.

== See also ==
- National Register of Historic Places listings in Hartford County, Connecticut
