= Theophilus Gates =

American religious leader (1787–1846)

- Born: January 12, 1787; Hartland, Connecticut, U.S.
- Died: October 30, 1846 (aged 59)
- Burial place: Oak Grove Cemetery, Parker Ford, Pennsylvania, U.S.
- Occupation: Religious leader
- Known for: Founder of the Battle Axes sect

Theophilus Ransom Gates (January 12, 1787 – October 30, 1846) was an American religious leader who founded a sect known as the "Battle Axes", a free-love perfectionist Christian sect near Pottstown, Pennsylvania.

== Biography ==
Theophilus Gates was born in 1787 in Hartland, Connecticut. As a young man, he left town to travel, teach, and eventually preach. By 1810, he had settled in Philadelphia and he began to publish religious tracts and pamphlets. He became acquainted with Lorenzo Dow, the itinerant preacher, and John Humphrey Noyes, the future founder of the Oneida Community.

In 1837, Gates began to develop and publicize his religious philosophy by publishing and selling the broadside "Battle-Axe and Weapons of War". It opens with a quotation from the Book of Jeremiah (51:20): "Thou art my battle-axe and weapons of war; for thee will I break in pieces the nations; and with thee will I destroy kingdoms." He wrote "The truths of the Battle Axe are from the Lord and those that have opposed them will have to bear their own shame." Gates railed against Sunday blue laws, organized religion, clergymen, and marriage. While Gates was married, he described marriage as "man and wife, so called, living in strife and disagreement" and believed this institution would fade away.

Gates believed that the coming of Christ changed the very nature of human love. He believed that "falling in love" was "an enchantment of the devil". Gates instead advocated a "free intercourse between sexes" instead of monogamy. His free-love ideal emphasized kindness, generosity and tenderness for the loved one.

Along with Hannah Williamson, a self-declared prophet, Gates established a small community for himself and his followers in East Coventry Township, Pennsylvania. The area became known as Free Love Valley due to two of the more controversial tenets of his sect: nudism and polyamory.

Gates died in 1846 and was succeeded by Williamson. An unsolved murder within the community ultimately led to its breakup: one of the members, Hannah Shingle, was murdered in her own home with her own axe. The sect dissolved and Williamson left the area in 1857.

== Selected works ==
- Gates, Theophilus (1810). The Trials, Experience, Exercises of Mind, and First Travels, of Theophilus R. Gates. Poughkeepsie.
- Gates, Theophilus (1811). Truth, or the Religious Sentiments of Theophilus R. Gates.
- Gates, Theophilus (1812). Truth Advocated. Poughkeepsie.
- Gates, Theophilus (1813). Remarks upon the Goodness and Severity of God. Philadelphia.
- Gates, Theophilus (1814). A View of the Last Dispensation of Light that will be in the World. Philadelphia.
- Gates, Theophilus (1815). A Measuring Reed, to separate between The Precious and the Vile. Philadelphia.
- Gates, Theophilus (1837). Battle Axe and Weapons of War. Philadelphia.
