= East Otis, Massachusetts =

Village in Otis, Massachusetts, US

Coordinates: 42°10′24″N 73°02′04″W

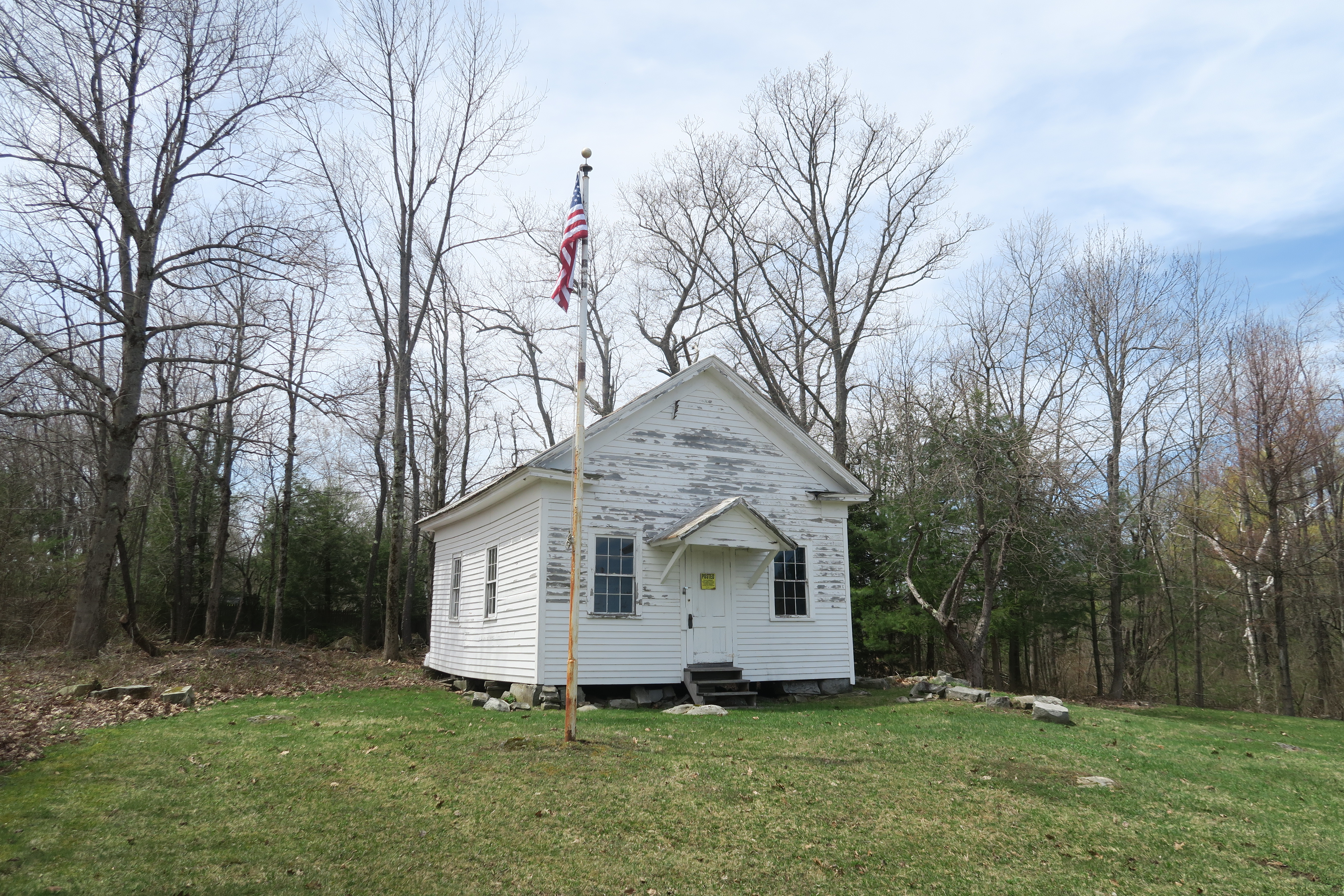
East Otis School

East Otis is part of the town of Otis in Berkshire County, Massachusetts, United States. As of the 2000 census, East Otis had a total population of 572.

== Geography ==
According to the United States Census Bureau, East Otis has a total area of 14.12 mi^{2}, of which 12.32 mi^{2} is land and 1.81 mi^{2} is water.

== Demographics ==
As of the census of 2000, there were 572 people and 993 households residing in East Otis. Its racial makeup was 561 White, one African American, and two of the population were Hispanic or Latino of any race.

The average household size was 2.56.

The median income for a household in East Otis was $46528, and the median income for a family was $139300.

== Notable site ==
Most of Otis Reservoir is located within the limits of East Otis.
