= Consider Tiffany =

British loyalist in colonial America (1732–1796)

- Born: March 15, 1732; Lyme, Connecticut, British America
- Died: June 19, 1796 (aged 64); Hartland, Connecticut, United States
- Resting place: Hartland, Connecticut
- Known for: Loyalist views
- Criminal charge: House arrest for outspoken Toryism
- Spouse: Sarah Wilder
- Children: 6

Consider Tiffany (March 15, 1732 – June 19, 1796) was a British loyalist and storekeeper in Colonial America. He also served as a sergeant during the French and Indian War. He is described in the book The Tiffanys of America by Nelson Otis Tiffany: "in addition to making his living as a storekeeper and a farmer, was a brave soldier, good churchman, a writer of prose and poetry, and astronomer."

Tiffany was one of the first settlers of West Hartland, Connecticut. One of his manuscripts was donated to the Library of Congress by his patrilineal descendant, G. Bradford Tiffany. It is viewed by historians as an important primary source document for understanding the American Revolution and Nathan Hale. Tiffany wrote a broadside in a thirty four-stanza verse, called "Of the Melancholy Death of Six Young Persons Who Were Killed by Lightning in the Month of June, 1767", noting the deaths of Martin Wilcox, James Rice, Sarah Larkim, Joseph Young, Curtis Chuet, and William Burt. Another edition, with slight textual variations and eight additional stanzas also exists.

== The Tiffany Elm ==
Tiffany planted an elm tree in 1775, which became known as the "Tiffany Elm." It was the second largest tree in the state (circumference 21 feet, branch spread 100 feet), though some sources say it was the fourth largest tree in Connecticut at the time. In full bloom, the Tiffany Elm was known for its beauty and symmetry and its image became the seal for the Town of Hartland.

== Tiffany family history ==
In 1901, Charles Lewis Tiffany, founder of Tiffany and Co., commissioned a family genealogy documenting the Tiffany family history back to Squire Humphrey Tiffany. Much is written of the "Consider Tiffany Line." Consider Tiffany was the son of Consider Tiffany Sr. and Naomi Niles, who married in November 1731. His great-grandfather, Squire Humphrey Tiffany, is the forefather of the Tiffany family in the United States, arriving in America from Yorkshire, England in 1660. Squire Tiffany was killed by a lightning strike on July 15, 1685, while en route to Boston. Scholars have surmised that this death had an important impact on Consider Tiffany's writing, particularly his broadsides.

Tiffany's wife Sarah Wilder was a descendant of Deacon Edmund Rice, founder of Sudbury, Massachusetts, and Thomasine Frost.
