= Granville State Forest =

Protected area in Massachusetts, United States

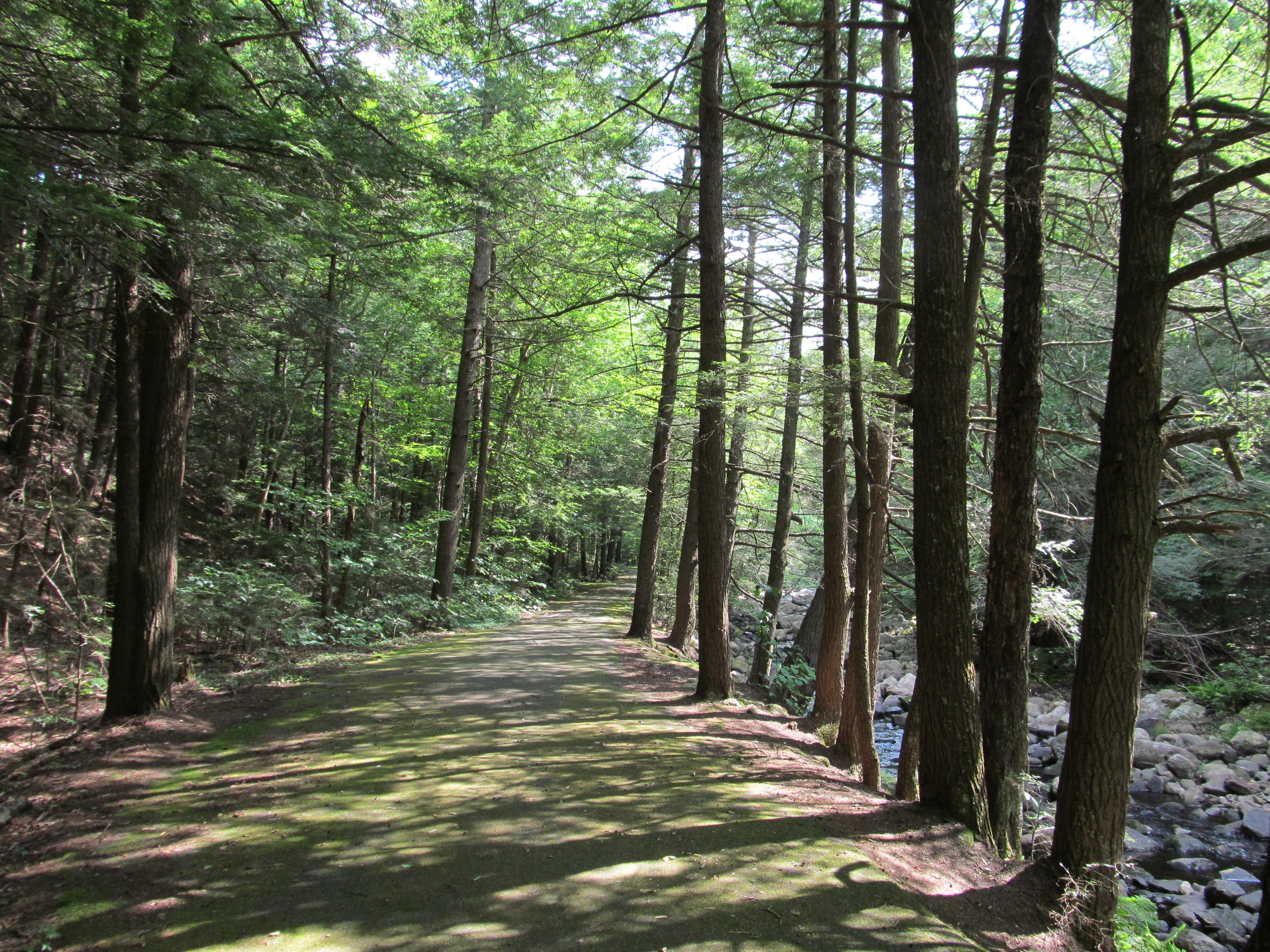
- Granville State Forest

- Location within Massachusetts Location within the United States
- Location: Granville and Tolland, Massachusetts, United States
- Coordinates: 42°3′35″N 72°58′17″W
- Area: 2,432 acres (984 ha)
- Elevation: 1,194 ft (364 m)
- Administrator: Massachusetts Department of Conservation and Recreation
- Website: Official website

Granville State Forest is a Massachusetts state forest with recreational features located in the towns of Granville and Tolland in the southern Berkshire Hills along the state's southern border with Connecticut. The forest is managed by the Department of Conservation and Recreation. It is adjacent to Connecticut's Tunxis State Forest.

== Description ==
This area was once the Tunxis Native American tribe's hunting and fishing grounds. After discovery by English pioneer Samuel Hubbard in 1749 much of it was converted to open pasture and farmland. Under protection, the forest is regenerating with typical northern conifers and hardwoods. The Hubbard River drops 450 feet (140 m) in 2.5 miles (4.0 km), forming pools and waterfalls as it passes over various rock formations.

== Activities and amenities ==
The forest offers trails for hiking, horseback riding, mountain biking, snowshoeing, and cross-country skiing, plus camping, fishing and restricted hunting.
