= Little Pond (Orange County, New York) =

- Location within New York
- Location: Orange County, New York
- Coordinates: 41.4695256°N 74.6918554°W
- Type: lake
- Surface area: 6 acres (2.4 ha)

Little Pond is a lake in Orange County, in the U.S. state of New York. The pond has a surface area of 6 acres (2.4 ha).

Little Pond was so named on account of its diminutive size. Just over three miles away, its twin Big Pond sits. Big Pond is rather larger than Little Pond, and is accessible from Little Pond via a hiking trail and Big Pond Road.
