= Otis, Massachusetts =

Town in Massachusetts, United States

- Town
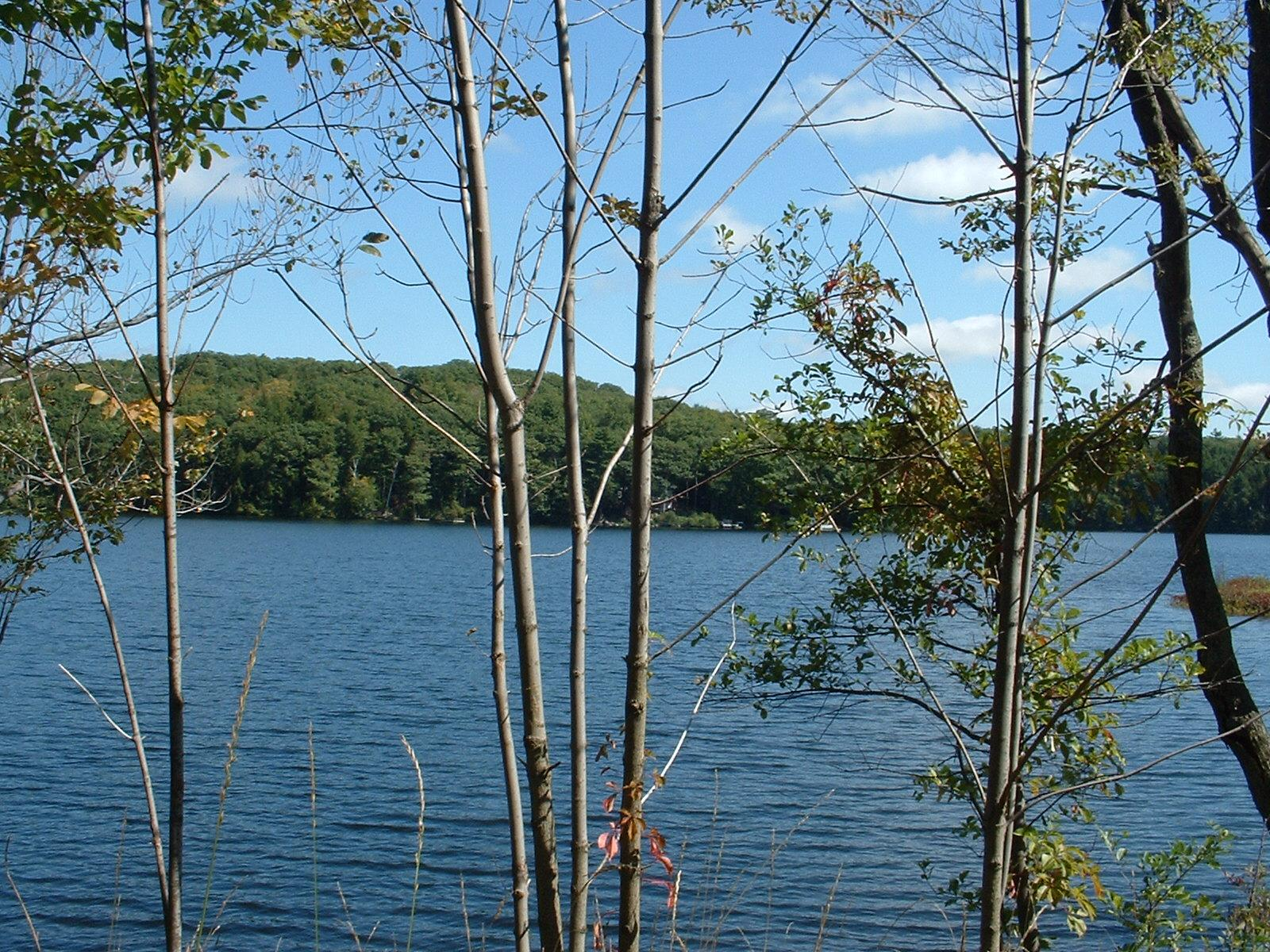
- Benton Pond, East Otis

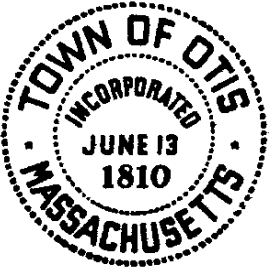
- Seal

- Location in Berkshire County and the state of Massachusetts.
- Coordinates: 42°11′35″N 73°05′32″W
- Country: United States
- State: Massachusetts
- County: Berkshire
- Settled: 1735
- Incorporated (as Loudon): 1810
- Incorporated (as Otis): June 13, 1810

Government
  - Type: Open town meeting

Area
  - Total: 38.0 sq mi (98.5 km^{2})
  - Land: 35.6 sq mi (92.1 km^{2})
  - Water: 2.5 sq mi (6.5 km^{2})
- Elevation: 1,220 ft (372 m)

Population (2020)
  - Total: 1,634
  - Density: 46.0/sq mi (17.7/km^{2})
- Time zone: UTC−5 (Eastern)
  - Summer (DST): UTC−4 (Eastern)
- ZIP Codes: 01253 (Otis); 01029 (East Otis); 01245 (West Otis); 01008 (Blandford)
- Area code: 413
- FIPS code: 25-51580
- GNIS feature ID: 0619422
- Website: www.townofotisma.com

Otis is a town in Berkshire County, Massachusetts, United States. It is part of the Pittsfield, Massachusetts, Metropolitan Statistical Area. The population was 1,634 at the 2020 census.

== History ==
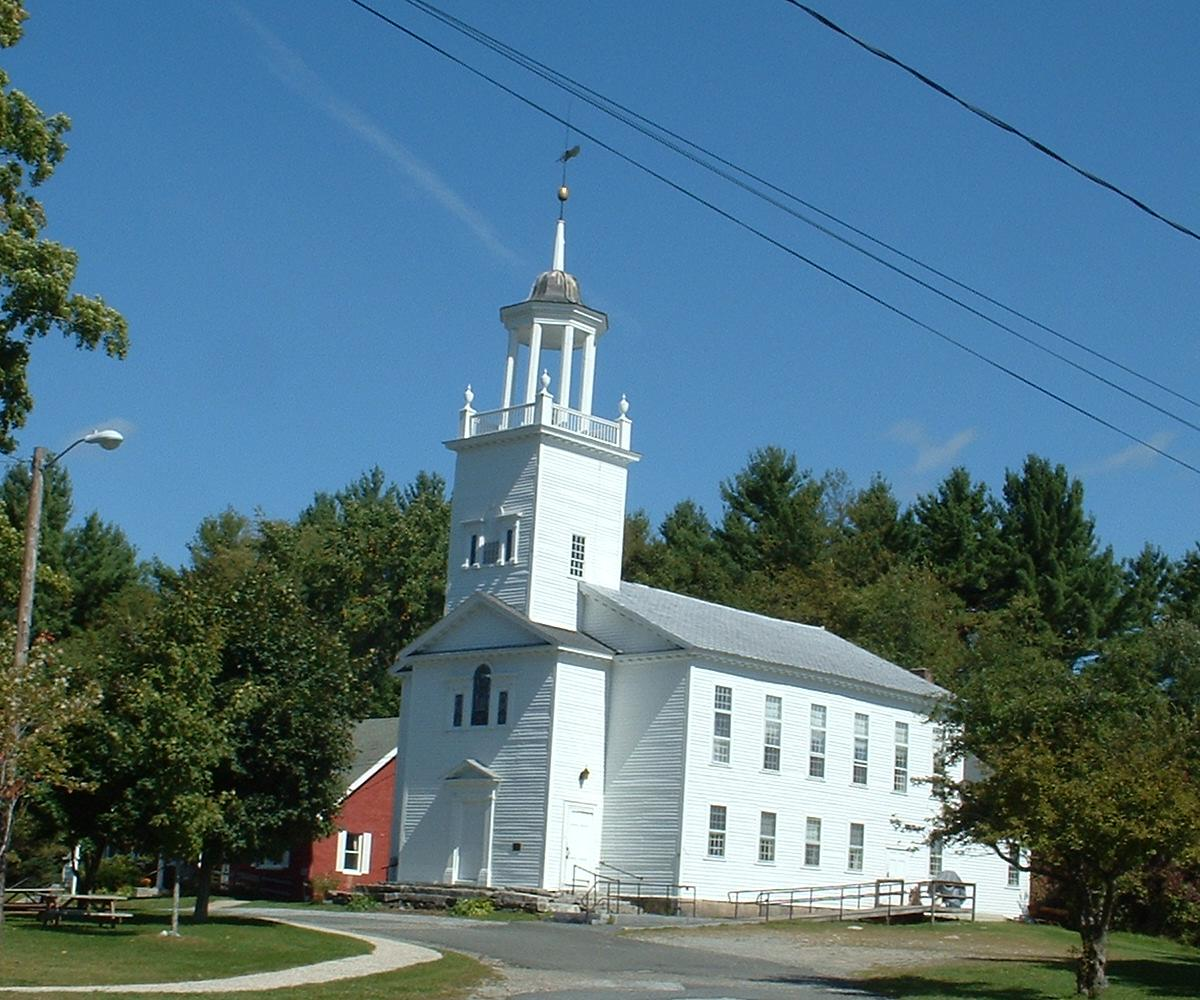
Otis First Congregational Church

The town was incorporated in 1810, created when the unincorporated town of Loudon annexed the adjacent District of Bethlehem in 1809. It was named after Harrison Gray Otis, an influential lawyer, financier, and politician in revolutionary Massachusetts. Colonel Henry Knox passed through the town in January 1776, bringing cannons from Fort Ticonderoga in New York to aid in ending the Siege of Boston, a route now known as the Knox Trail. The town was a farming community, with several small mill industries growing along the waterways, and today is mostly rural with some tourism.

== Geography ==
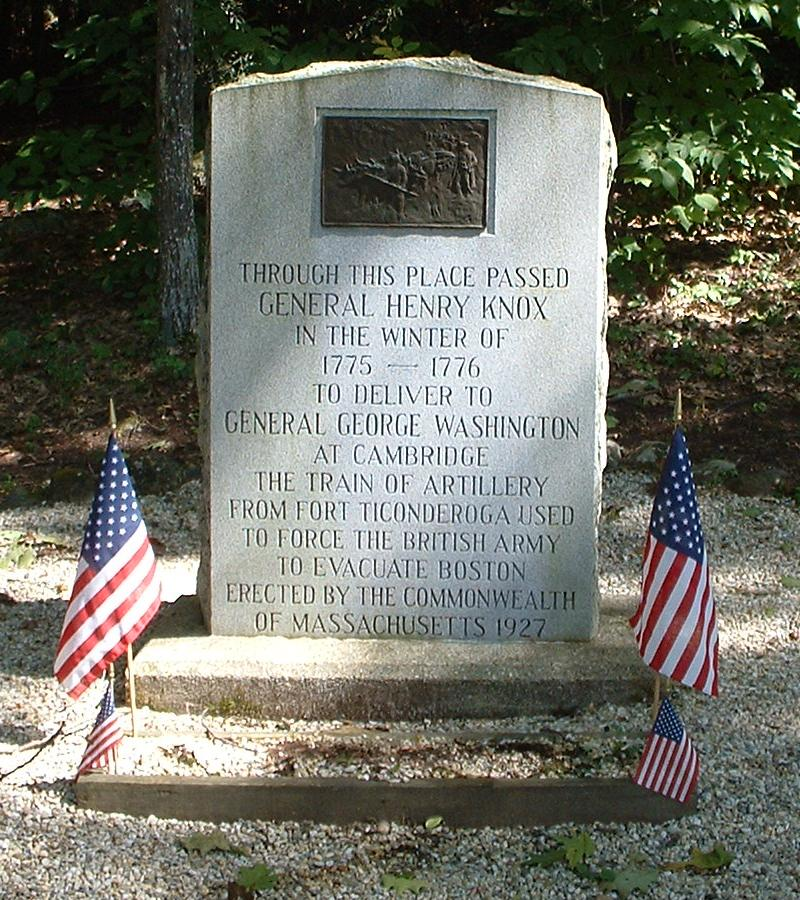
A Knox Trail marker, near Benton Pond in East Otis

According to the United States Census Bureau, the town has a total area of 38.0 square miles (98.5 km^{2}), of which 35.6 square miles (92.1 km^{2}) is land and 2.5 square miles (6.5 km^{2}), or 6.55%, is water. Otis lies along the eastern border of Berkshire County with Hampden County, bordered by Becket to the north, Blandford to the east, Tolland to the southeast, Sandisfield to the south, and Monterey and Tyringham to the west. Otis is 23 miles (37 km) southeast of Pittsfield, 30 miles (48 km) west-northwest of Springfield, and 116 miles (187 km) west of Boston.

Otis lies in the southern end of the Berkshire Mountains, and is dotted by several hills. The West Branch of the Farmington River rises in the town, heading southward towards the Connecticut River. The southeastern part of town is dominated by the Otis Reservoir and Big Pond, as well as portions of Tolland State Forest and Otis State Forest. The highest points in the town are to the north, with Church Hill to the east and Kingsbury Mountain to the west. Much of the land around the brooks of town is marshy. Just west of the town center is Otis Ridge Ski Area. Most of the population is around the reservoir and the center of town.

Otis lies at the intersection of Massachusetts Route 8 and Route 23. Route 8 was once part of the New England highway network, as the Stratford-Waterbury-North Adams Route. Route 23 is known as the Knox Trail, with a historical marker along the route in the eastern part of town. Interstate 90 (the Massachusetts Turnpike) passes through the northern edge of town twice, with the nearest exit being in Lee. There is no rail, bus or air service in town, with the nearest being in Pittsfield and Westfield. The nearest national air service is at Bradley International Airport in Windsor Locks, Connecticut.

== Climate ==
In a typical year temperatures in Otis fall below 50 °F (10 °C) on 205 days. Annual precipitation averages 48 inches per year, and snow covers the ground 69 days (or 18.9% of the year) .The humidity is below 60% for approximately 18.4 days (or 5% of the year).

Climate data for West Otis, Massachusetts, 1981–2010 normals
Month	Jan	Feb	Mar	Apr	May	Jun	Jul	Aug	Sep	Oct	Nov	Dec	Year
Mean daily maximum °F (°C)	28.8 (−1.8)	32.7 (0.4)	40.9 (4.9)	54.3 (12.4)	66.3 (19.1)	72.9 (22.7)	77.8 (25.4)	76.0 (24.4)	68.5 (20.3)	57.2 (14.0)	46.3 (7.9)	33.8 (1.0)	54.6 (12.6)
Daily mean °F (°C)	19.8 (−6.8)	22.9 (−5.1)	31.2 (−0.4)	43.0 (6.1)	54.3 (12.4)	62.4 (16.9)	67.1 (19.5)	65.6 (18.7)	58.0 (14.4)	46.9 (8.3)	37.2 (2.9)	25.7 (−3.5)	44.5 (7.0)
Mean daily minimum °F (°C)	10.9 (−11.7)	13.0 (−10.6)	21.4 (−5.9)	31.7 (−0.2)	42.2 (5.7)	51.8 (11.0)	56.4 (13.6)	55.2 (12.9)	47.5 (8.6)	36.6 (2.6)	28.1 (−2.2)	17.6 (−8.0)	34.4 (1.3)
Average precipitation inches (mm)	3.33 (85)	3.16 (80)	3.88 (99)	3.96 (101)	4.08 (104)	4.49 (114)	4.02 (102)	4.08 (104)	4.13 (105)	4.67 (119)	4.18 (106)	3.72 (94)	47.70 (1,212)
Average snowfall inches (cm)	16.1 (41)	11.4 (29)	8.3 (21)	2.1 (5.3)	0.0 (0.0)	0.0 (0.0)	0.0 (0.0)	0.0 (0.0)	0.0 (0.0)	0.5 (1.3)	3.5 (8.9)	11.7 (30)	53.6 (136.5)
Average precipitation days (≥ 0.01 in)	11.3	10.5	11.1	11.3	12.7	12.0	10.3	10.1	8.9	9.8	10.8	11.9	130.7
Average snowy days (≥ 0.1 in)	6.7	6.3	4.5	1.3	0.0	0.0	0.0	0.0	0.0	0.1	1.3	5.5	25.7
Source: NOAA

== Demographics ==
Historical population
Year	Pop.	±%
1790	605^{1}	—
1850	1,224	—
1860	998	−18.5%
1870	960	−3.8%
1880	785	−18.2%
1890	583	−25.7%
1900	476	−18.4%
1910	494	+3.8%
1920	361	−26.9%
1930	367	+1.7%
1940	364	−0.8%
1950	359	−1.4%
1960	473	+31.8%
1970	820	+73.4%
1980	963	+17.4%
1990	1,073	+11.4%
2000	1,365	+27.2%
2010	1,612	+18.1%
2020	1,634	+1.4%
2022*	1,626	−0.5%
^1 sum for Loudon and Bethlehem * = population estimate. Source: United States census records and Population Estimates Program data.

As of the census of 2000, there were 1,365 people, 567 households, and 386 families residing in the town. By population, Otis ranks 19th out of the 32 cities and towns in Berkshire County, and 312th out of 351 cities and towns in Massachusetts. The population density was 38.1 inhabitants per square mile (14.7/km^{2}), which ranks it 18th in the county and 312th in the Commonwealth. There were 1,572 housing units at an average density of 43.9 per square mile (16.9/km^{2}). The racial makeup of the town was 96.56% White, 0.59% African American, 0.29% Native American, 0.88% Asian, 0.37% from other races, and 1.32% from two or more races. Hispanic or Latino of any race were 0.29% of the population.

There were 567 households, out of which 26.6% had children under the age of 18 living with them, 59.1% were married couples living together, 5.5% had a female householder with no husband present, and 31.9% were non-families. Of all households, 24.3% were made up of individuals, and 7.6% had someone living alone who was 65 years of age or older. The average household size was 2.4 and the average family size was 2.9.

In the town, the population was spread out, with 21.8% under the age of 18, 5.7% from 18 to 24, 28.1% from 25 to 44, 30.3% from 45 to 64, and 14.1% who were 65 years of age or older. The median age was 42 years. For every 100 females, there were 111.6 males. For every 100 females age 18 and over, there were 108.2 males.

The median income for a household in the town was $51,488, and the median income for a family was $55,455. Males had a median income of $41,065 versus $30,179 for females. The per capita income for the town was $25,029. About 4.6% of families and 7.4% of the population were below the poverty line, including 11.4% of those under age 18 and 4.2% of those age 65 or over.

== Government ==
Otis uses the open town meeting form of government, and is led by a board of selectmen and an administrative assistant. The current Board of Selectmen consists of Bill Hiller, Larry Southard, and Gary Thomas. All four of the town's main offices, including the town hall, police and fire departments and the town library, are located at the center of town, as is the central post office. A second post office is located in East Otis. The library is a part of the regional library systems. The nearest hospital, Noble Hospital, is 20 miles (32 km) away in Westfield.

On the state level, Otis is represented in the Massachusetts House of Representatives by the Fourth Berkshire district, which covers southern Berkshire County, as well as the westernmost towns in Hampden County. In the Massachusetts Senate, the town is represented by the Berkshire, Hampshire and Franklin district, which includes all of Berkshire County and western Hampshire and Franklin counties. The town is patrolled by the Otis Police Department, as well as the First (Lee) Station of Barracks "B" of the Massachusetts State Police. Kris McDonough serves as the Chief of Police and Director of Emergency Management for the town. Richard Phair serves as the Fire Chief.

On the national level, Otis is represented in the United States House of Representatives as part of Massachusetts's 1st congressional district, and has been represented by Democrat Richard Neal of Springfield, Massachusetts since January 2013. Massachusetts is currently represented in the United States Senate by senior senator Elizabeth Warren and junior senator Ed Markey, both Democrats as well.

Otis presidential election results
Year	Democratic	Republican	Third parties	Total Votes	Margin
2020	54.24% 550	43.49% 441	2.27% 23	1,014	10.75%
2016	47.10% 431	44.48% 407	8.42% 77	915	2.62%
2012	58.84% 489	37.55% 312	3.61% 30	831	21.30%
2008	58.95% 504	37.19% 318	3.86% 33	855	21.75%
2004	56.27% 422	42.67% 320	1.07% 8	750	13.60%
2000	44.29% 283	44.91% 287	10.80% 69	639	0.63%
1996	48.30% 298	30.79% 190	20.91% 129	617	17.50%
1992	40.00% 240	29.33% 176	30.67% 184	600	9.33%
1988	41.63% 199	58.16% 278	0.21% 1	478	16.53%
1984	27.34% 117	72.43% 310	0.23% 1	428	45.09%
1980	29.87% 135	53.76% 243	16.37% 74	452	23.89%
1976	46.59% 205	50.23% 221	3.18% 14	440	3.64%
1972	36.50% 142	63.50% 247	0.00% 0	389	26.99%
1968	31.21% 98	57.96% 182	10.83% 34	314	26.75%
1964	56.64% 128	42.48% 96	0.88% 2	226	14.16%
1960	26.67% 68	73.33% 187	0.00% 0	255	46.67%
1956	19.17% 51	79.32% 211	1.50% 4	266	60.15%
1952	21.13% 56	78.49% 208	0.38% 1	265	57.36%
1948	26.82% 59	70.91% 156	2.27% 5	220	44.09%
1944	31.75% 60	68.25% 129	0.00% 0	189	36.51%
1940	30.37% 58	69.11% 132	0.52% 1	191	38.74%

== Education ==
Otis, along with neighboring Sandisfield is part of the Farmington River Regional School District. The district's only school, Farmington River Elementary School, houses students from pre-kindergarten through sixth grades. For the upper grades, most students attend either (1) Great Barrington-based Monument Valley Regional Middle School and Monument Mountain Regional High School or (2) Lee Middle/High School. Proximity to private schools located in Lenox, Great Barrington, or Westfield allow alternatives to public school.

The nearest community college is Berkshire Community College in Pittsfield and Great Barrington. The nearest state college is Westfield State University. The nearest private colleges are Elms College in Chicopee and Smith College in Northampton.
