= Blandford Ski Area =

Defunct ski area in Blandford, Massachusetts, United States

Ski Blandford
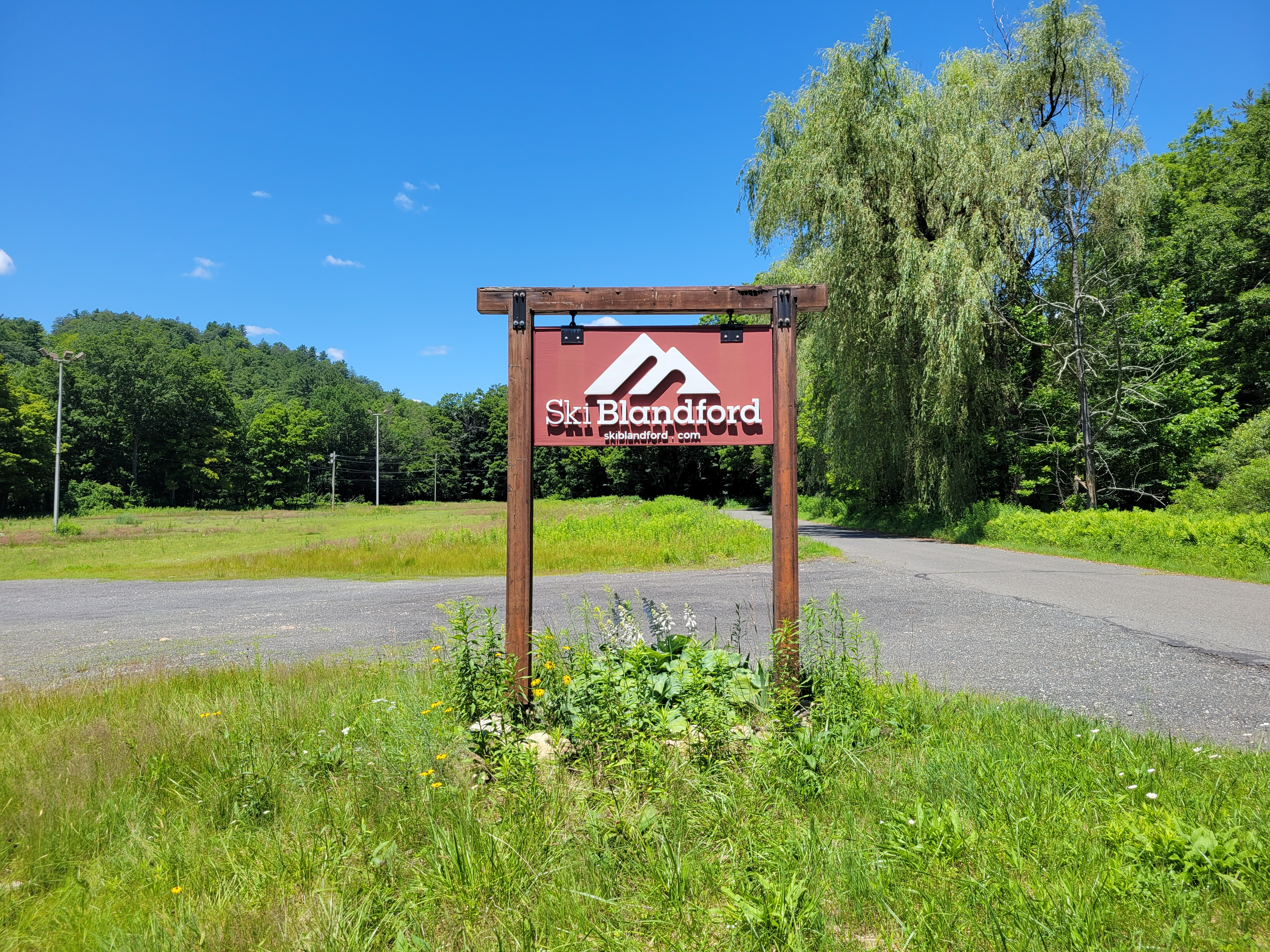
- Ski Blandford sign
- Interactive map of Ski Blandford
- Location: 41 Nye Brook Road, Blandford, Massachusetts
- Nearest city: Blandford, Massachusetts
- Coordinates: 42°11′19.865″N 72°54′2.765″W
- Vertical: 465 ft (142 m)
- Top elevation: 1,490 ft (450 m)
- Base elevation: 1,025 ft (312 m)
- Skiable area: 132 acres (53 ha)
- Trails: 27 trails
- Longest run: North Slope
- Lift system: 3 doubles, 2 surface lifts
- Terrain parks: 2
- Snowfall: average of 60-70 inches/year
- Snowmaking: 80%
- Night skiing: 12 trails, 4 lifts
- Website: skiblandford.com

Ski Blandford (formally known as Blandford Ski Area) was a ski area located in Blandford, Massachusetts. It was owned and operated by the Springfield Ski Club from 1936 until 2017, when it was sold to private hands, and was the oldest, continuously operating club-owned ski area in North America.

In 1960, Springfield Ski Club had seven runs, six tow ropes, a lodge and cafeteria, lift fees were US$2.50, and the season ran from December 1 to April 1.

In fall of 2017, Blandford underwent a private sale to Ski Butternut. Butternut had planned on re-opening the ski area that same year and had started making snow when inspections of their lifts and other facilities made it abundantly clear that they would need more time to get everything up to code. The mountain and its buildings have since been heavily remodeled. More snowmaking was added, two new groomers were brought in and the ski lodges interiors and exteriors were updated. Following successful refurbishments, it reopened as Ski Blandford for the 2018/2019 ski season and had remained open until March 26, 2020, when it was announced that Ski Blandford would not reopen for 2020/2021 season and would be permanently closed.

== Mountain Information ==
Blandford Ski Area had 27 trails (12 lighted for night skiing), 2 terrain parks, and 5 lifts: 3 double chairlifts, a rope tow, and a magic carpet lift. The base is located at 1,025 ft and the summit is located at 1,490 ft; a 465 ft vertical drop. They had updated snow-making that covers about 80% of the mountain, as well as up-to-date grooming. They had two lodges; an older lodge, and a new lodge with hot food service. The average season at Blandford Ski Area lasted from mid to late December to middle March.

=== Trails ===
- - Easier 30%
- - More Difficult 45%
- - Most Difficult: 25%
