= Blandford (CDP), Massachusetts =

Blandford, Massachusetts
- Census-designated place
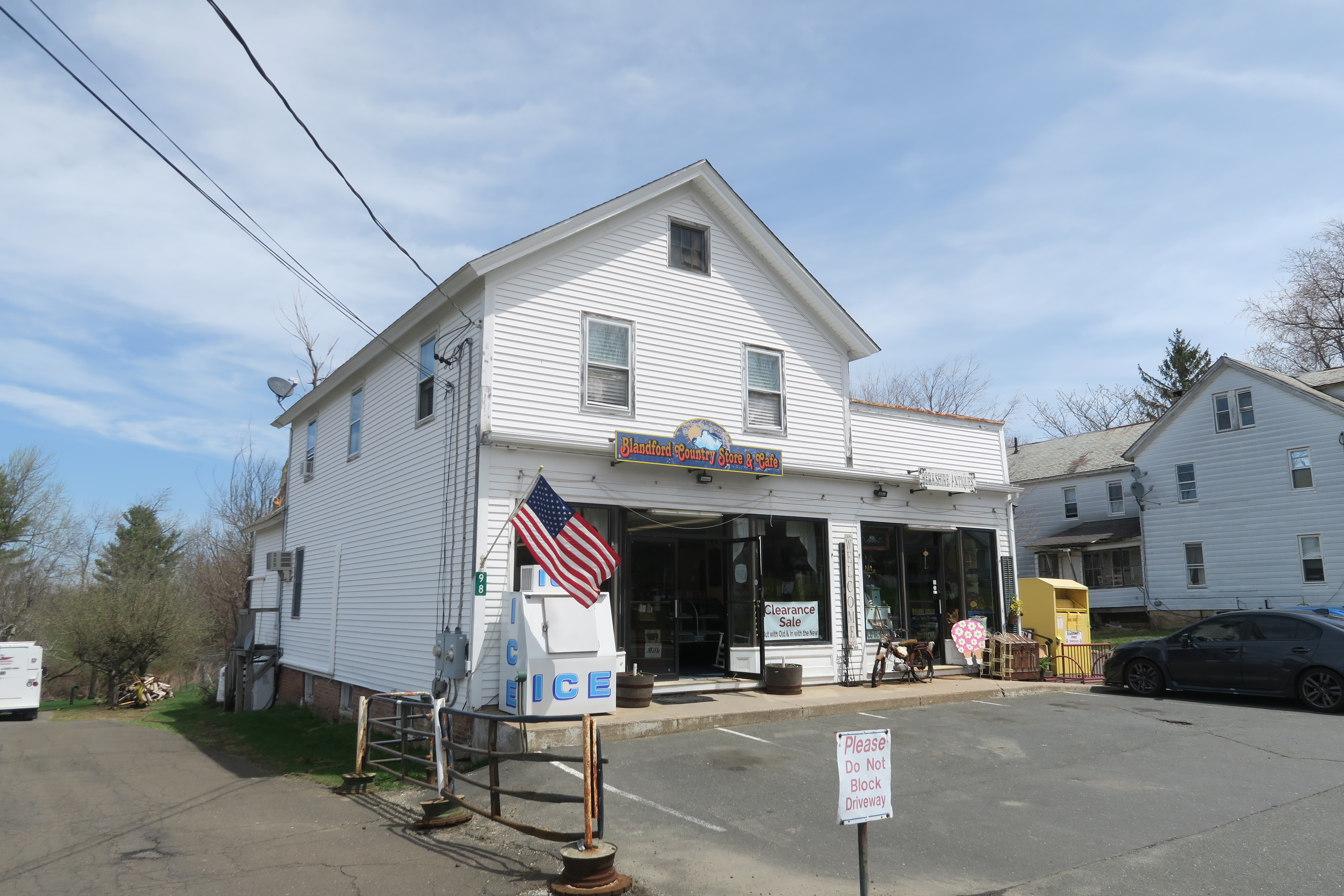
- Blandford Country Store

- Location in Hampden County in Massachusetts
- Coordinates: 42°10′49″N 72°55′46″W
- Country: United States
- State: Massachusetts
- County: Hampden
- Town: Blandford

Area
  - Total: 1.15 sq mi (2.98 km^{2})
  - Land: 1.15 sq mi (2.98 km^{2})
  - Water: 0.0039 sq mi (0.01 km^{2})
- Elevation: 1,451 ft (442.4 m)

Population (2020)
  - Total: 363
  - Density: 315.6/sq mi (121.84/km^{2})
- Time zone: UTC-5 (Eastern (EST))
  - Summer (DST): UTC-4 (EDT)
- ZIP code: 01008
- Area code: 413
- FIPS code: 25-06050
- GNIS feature ID: 0608279

Blandford is a census-designated place that comprises the populated center of the town of Blandford in Hampden County, Massachusetts, United States. The population of the CDP was 393 at the 2010 census, out of 1,233 in the entire town of Blandford. It is part of the Springfield, Massachusetts Metropolitan Statistical Area.

== Geography ==
The Blandford CDP is in the east-central part of the town of Blandford, at the junction of Massachusetts Route 23 and North Street. The CDP extends approximately 0.5 miles (0.8 km) north, west, and south from the town center and approximately 1.5 miles (2.4 km) east along Route 23. Interstate 90, the Massachusetts Turnpike, forms the northeastern edge of the CDP, although there is no direct access to the community from the turnpike. Blandford sits at an elevation of 1,451 feet (442.4 m) at the eastern edge of the Berkshires.

According to the United States Census Bureau, the CDP has a total area of 1.2 square miles (3.0 km^{2}), all land.

== Demographics ==
Historical population
Census	Pop.	Note	%±
2020	363		—
U.S. Decennial Census
