= HMS Blandford (1720) =

Sixth-rate frigate of the Royal Navy

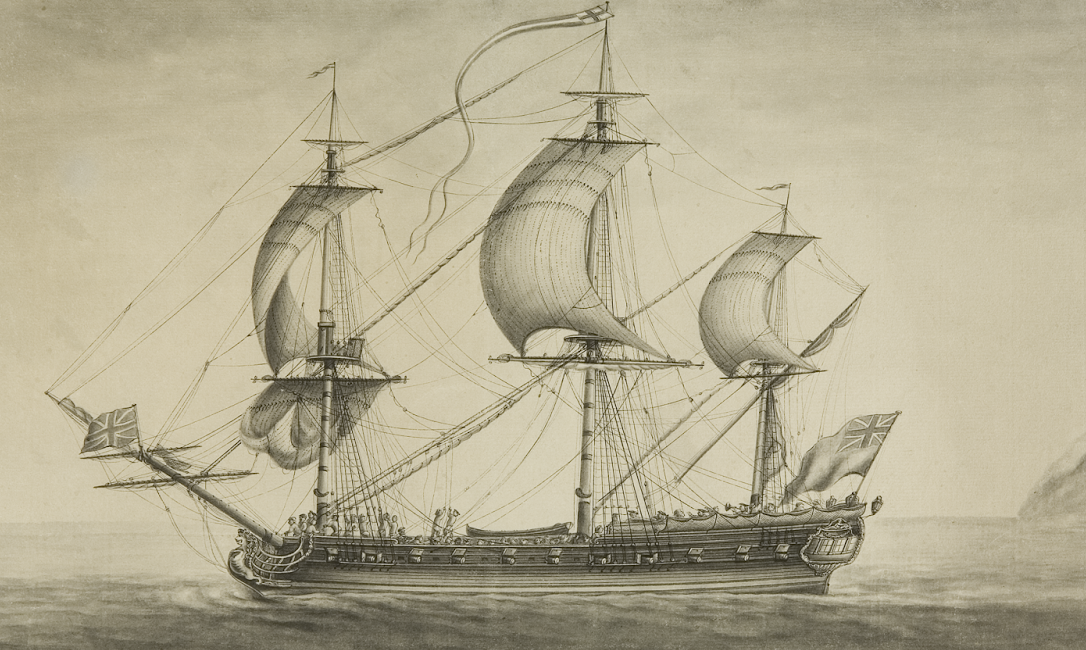
- c. 1760 engraving of Blandford by Nicholas Pocock

History

United Kingdom
- Name: HMS Blandford
- Ordered: 4 July 1719
- Builder: Royal Dockyard, Deptford
- Cost: £3,041.11.3d plus £480.0.83/4 for fitting
- Launched: 13 February 1720
- Completed: 4 March 1720
- Commissioned: 1720
- Fate: Sold at Deptford 28 October 1742

General characteristics
- Type: 20-gun Sixth Rate
- Tons burthen: 375 18/94 bm
- Length: 106 ft 0 in (32.3 m) gundeck; 87 ft 3 in (26.6 m) keel for tonnage
- Beam: 28 ft 5.5 in (8.7 m) for tonnage
- Depth of hold: 9 ft 2 in (2.8 m)
- Armament: 20 × 6-pdr 19 cwt guns on wooden trucks (UD)

HMS Blandford was a 20-gun sixth-rate frigate of the Royal Navy. Launched in 1720, she was a member of the 1719 Establishment Group of 20-gun sixth rates. After being commissioned, she spent her career in the British Isles, the Baltic, North America and the Mediterranean on trade protection duties. After more than 20 years of service in the Royal Navy, she was sold at Deptford Dockyard in October 1742. Her new owner, the Bristol merchant James Pearce, refitted the vessel and entered her into the Atlantic slave trade. She made a single slave voyage before being sold again; her final fate is unknown. Blandford was the second named vessel since it was used for a 24-gun sixth rate launched at Woolwich on 29 October 1711 and lost with all hands in the Bay of Biscay on 23 March 1719.

== Construction ==
She was ordered on 4 July 1719 from Deptford Dockyard to be built under the guidance of Richard Stacey, Master Shipwright of Deptford. She was launched on 13 February 1720. She was completed for sea on 4 March 1720 at a cost of 3,041.11.3d (Note: A total cost accounting for inflation of approximately £543,300 in today's money.) plus 480.0.83/4 (Note: A total cost accounting for inflation of approximately £85,800 in today's money.) for fitting.

== Royal Navy career ==
She was commissioned in 1720 under the command of Captain William Martin, RN for service in the Baltic then to Carolina from 1721 to 24. She under the command of Captain George Protheroe, RN in 1727 for service in the Mediterranean in 1728 then she moved to New England in 1730/31. She returned home and paid off in July 1732. She was underwent a great repair at Sheerness from September 1732 to February 1733 at a cost of £1,872.1.9d. (Note: A total cost accounting for inflation of approximately £385,400 in today's money.) She was under the command of Captain George Burrish, RN for service in the North Sea in May 1732, She went to the Portuguese coast in 1734, then back to the English Channel in 1735 on to Georgia in 1738 and Jamaica 1739–40. She sailed for home with dispatches on 1 September 1740. She was surveyed in December 1740.

== Private career ==
In 1742, the Bristol merchant James Pearce purchased the vessel. After refitted her, he decided to enter Blandford into the Atlantic slave trade. Under Captain John Brackenridge, she undertook a slaving voyage. Of the 468 slaves embarked during Blandford's first and only known slavery voyage, only around 400 survived to be landed ashore in Kingston, Jamaica. Upon her return to England in June 1745, she was put up for sale a second time. The purchaser and her future unfolded is not known.

== Homage ==
The town of Blandford, Massachusetts, in the US, is named after her.
