= Otis Reservoir =

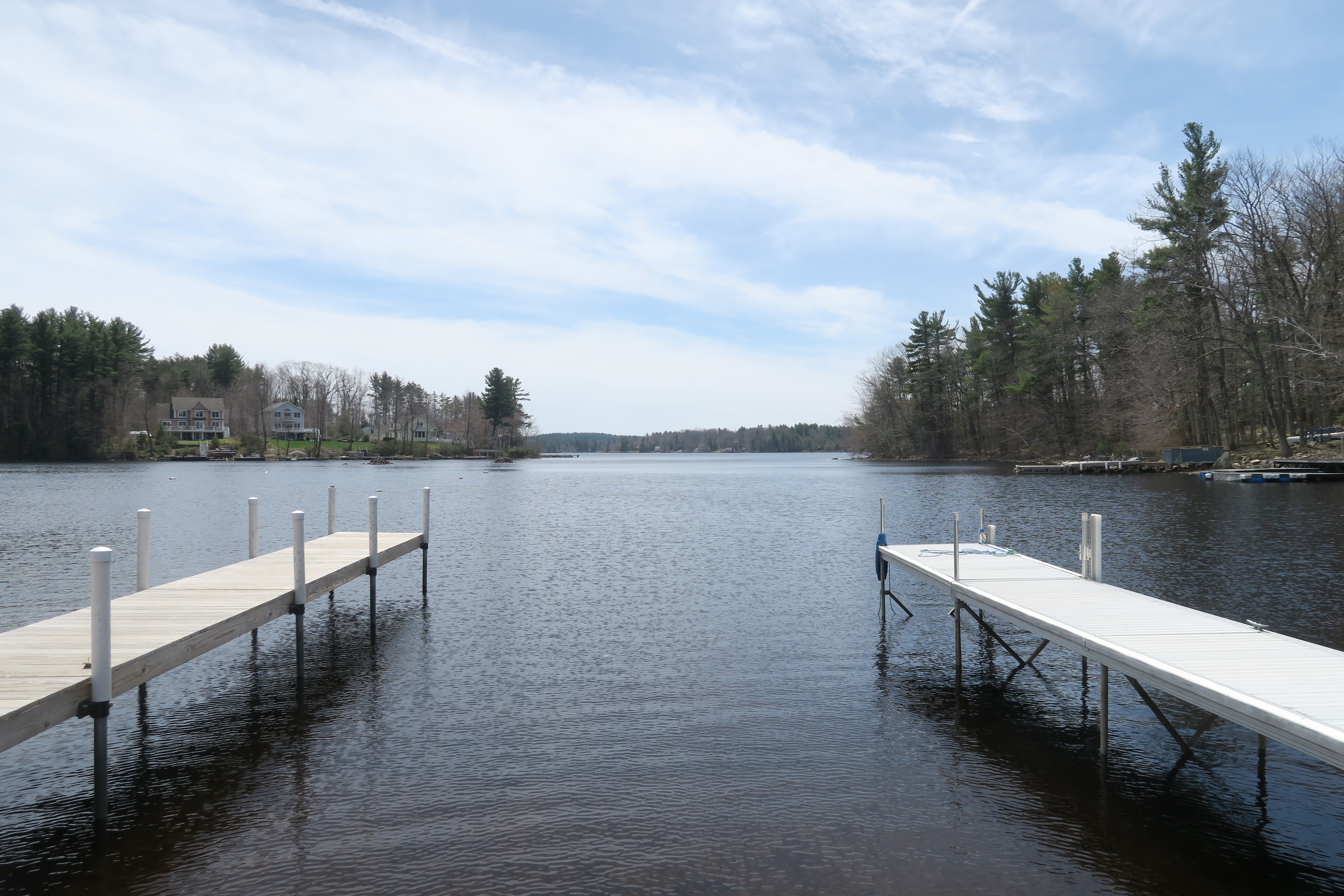
- Otis Reservoir

- Location within Massachusetts Location within the United States
- Location: Otis / Tolland / Blandford, Massachusetts, United States
- Coordinates: 42°09′15″N 73°02′26″W
- Lake type: reservoir
- Basin countries: United States
- Max. length: 3.0 mi (4.8 km)
- Surface area: 1,085 acres (4.39 km^{2})
- Average depth: 17.5 ft (5.33 m)
- Max. depth: 48.0 ft (14.63 m)
- Water volume: 5.6 billion US gallons (21,000,000 m^{3})
- Surface elevation: 1,417 ft (432 m)
- Islands: several

Otis Reservoir is a 1,085-acre (4 km^{2}) reservoir located primarily in Otis, Massachusetts, United States. Small portions are also in Tolland, MA, and Blandford, MA. The lake is popular for boating, swimming, fishing, water skiing, snowmobiling, camping, and water-related recreation. Fish include bass, white perch, yellow perch, tiger muskies, catfish, and bluegills. The reservoir is stocked with trout by the Massachusetts Division of Fisheries & Wildlife.

The current lake was formed from the flooding of three ponds, Rand, Little and Messenger Ponds in 1865, by a dam across the Fall River, a tributary of the Farmington River created by the Farmington River Power Company. It was used for water storage, ensuring a steady supply of water power for mills along the Farmington River. In the early part of the twentieth century, the rise of the automobile led to the development of many seasonal cottages along the lake shore. Building took place along most of the lake shore and on many inland lots. These cottages were fairly inexpensive, being purchased by middle-class people: bankers, barbers, tradesmen, construction contractors, and others.

A trend that accelerated in the 1980s was for wealthy people to purchase cottages and upgrade or replace them with expensive second homes. This trend continues. Many people from Connecticut and New York use these as weekend or vacation homes. In addition, many have converted their cottages into year-round residences.

Tolland State Forest, a popular camping, boat launch, and swimming area occupies about a quarter of the shoreline. A private campground, Camp Overflow, is also located on the reservoir. A small marina, D&J Marina, also run a boat launch facility on the north side of the lake.

The water level is seasonal, being lowered by about 10 feet (3.0 m) over the winter. The reservoir fills in the spring from snow melt and underground springs. The lake is usually at full level by late spring, but in the occasional years of low snow melt and low rainfall, it may remain up to several feet below its typical level. Water is let out of the lake in the fall so that ice will not damage docks and other structures around the lake. This also leads to excellent water quality, as a significant portion of the water is replaced every year.
