= Little Pond (Delaware County, New York) =

- Location of Little Pond within New York
- Location: Delaware County, New York
- Coordinates: 42°02′23″N 74°44′49″W
- Type: Lake
- Basin countries: United States
- Surface area: 17 acres (6.9 ha)
- Surface elevation: 1,991 ft (607 m)
- Settlements: Lewbeach

Little Pond is a small lake located northeast of the hamlet of Lewbeach in Delaware County, New York. Little Pond drains southeast via an unnamed creek that flows into Beaver Kill.

== See also ==
- List of lakes in New York
