= Big Pond (Massachusetts) =

Lake in Massachusetts, U.S.

- Location within Massachusetts Location within the United States
- Location: Berkshire County, Massachusetts, U.S.
- Coordinates: 42°11′36″N 73°02′31″W
- Max. length: 0.93 mi (1.5 km)
- Surface area: 330 acres (130 ha)
- Average depth: 15 ft (4.6 m)
- Max. depth: 26 ft (7.9 m)
- Surface elevation: 1,470 ft (450 m)

Big Pond is a 330-acre (130 ha) lake located in Otis, Massachusetts. The lake is popular for boating, swimming, fishing, water skiing, snowmobiling, camping, and water-related recreation. Fish include lake trout, bass, white perch, yellow perch, catfish, and bluegills. Big Pond is stocked with trout by the Division of Fisheries and Wildlife.

The Big Pond Association is a 501(c)(3) non-profit organization that oversees a number of activities throughout the year. In addition, the association has an active weed watcher program to identify invasive plant species and raises awareness of the threat.

On July 25, 1919, Big Pond was the site of the drowning of 11 boys and young men of the Springfield Boys' Club. A group of about 60 boys had been crossing the pond in several canoes and small boats when a squall swamped a rowboat. Efforts to save the boys were hindered by confusion and panic.
