= Hartland, Connecticut =

- Town
- Town of Hartland
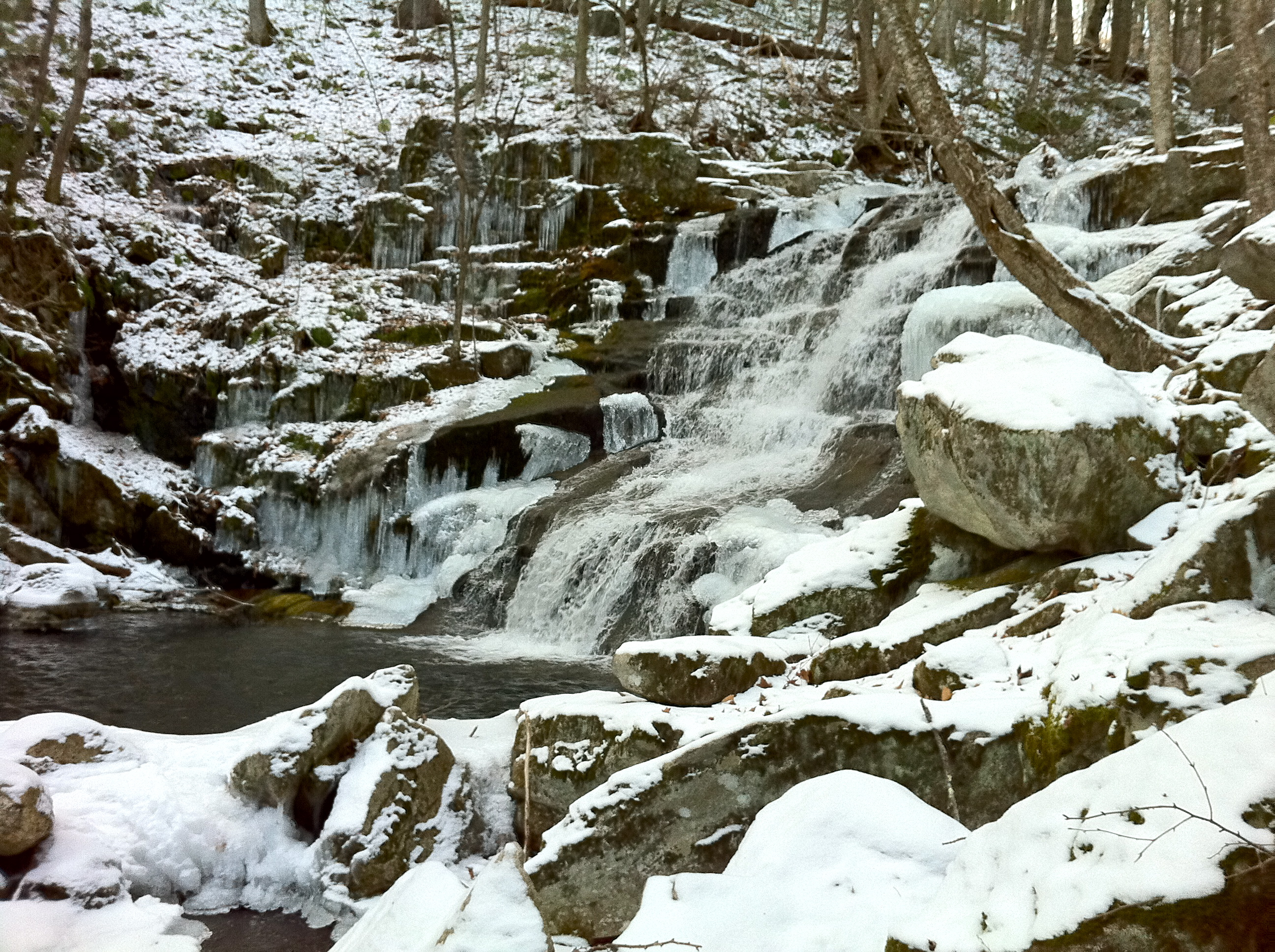
- Falls Brook in the Tunxis State Forest

- Seal
- Interactive map of Hartland, Connecticut
- Coordinates: 42°00′18″N 72°56′53″W
- Country: United States
- U.S. state: Connecticut
- County: Hartford
- Region: Northwest Hills
- Settled: 1754
- Incorporated: 1761
- Villages: East Hartland; West Hartland

Government
  - Type: Selectman-town meeting
  - First Selectman: Magi Winslow (D)
  - Selectman: Scott M. Levan (R)
  - Selectman: Gregory M. Sottile (D)

Area
  - Total: 34.6 sq mi (89.6 km^{2})
  - Land: 33.1 sq mi (85.7 km^{2})
  - Water: 1.5 sq mi (3.9 km^{2})
- Elevation: 531 ft (162 m)

Population (2020)
  - Total: 1,901
  - Density: 57.5/sq mi (22.2/km^{2})
- Time zone: UTC-5 (Eastern)
  - Summer (DST): UTC-4 (Eastern)
- ZIP Codes: 06027, 06091
- Area codes: 860/959
- FIPS code: 09-37140
- GNIS feature ID: 0213443
- Website: www.hartlandct.org

Hartland is a town in Hartford County, Connecticut, United States. The population was 1,901 at the 2020 census. The rural town is part of the Northwest Hills Planning Region and forms the northwestern border of Hartford County. Currently, the town consists of two unincorporated areas, East and West Hartland, entirely separated by the northern portion of the Barkhamsted Reservoir. A third area, Hartland Hollow (also referred to as Hartland Center), was flooded when the reservoir was completed in 1940.

== History ==
Originally referenced as the "Western Lands," the unsettled area was the subject of a 37-year controversy over competing claims by the Connecticut Colony and the towns of Hartford and Windsor. After the Colony's General Court was petitioned in 1724 to settle the dispute, it divided the lands among the three parties, which was followed by a confirming patent issued by Governor Joseph Talcott in 1729.

After another division agreement, Hartford's proprietors were granted a patent in 1732 for four parcels encompassing the lands now known as Hartland, Winchester, and New Hartford. Land in Hartland was proportionally granted on the basis of Hartford's 1720 Grand List. In 1733, the 67 landowners organized the Proprietors of Hartland association, and received a decree from the General Court for "Hartford land," then shortened to Hartland.

In 1754, Captain/Deacon Thomas Giddings Jr II (1723 -1790) and his wife Mary Coult became the town's first permanent settlers. In 1761, the 44 families of Hartland petitioned the General Court, and Hartland was incorporated as an independent town that same year.

== Geography ==
The town is bisected by the Farmington River's east branch which became the northern section of Barkhamsted Reservoir after construction of the Saville Dam in 1940. The reservoir and surrounding land, owned by the Metropolitan District Commission (MDC) water authority, fills the hollow between East and West mountains.

According to the United States Census Bureau, the town has a total area of 34.6 square miles (89.6 km^{2}), of which 33.1 square miles (85.7 km^{2}) is land and 1.5 square miles (3.9 km^{2}), or 4.39%, is water. Bounded on the north by the Massachusetts border, Hartland is drained by the Farmington River, a tributary of the Connecticut River. The 42nd parallel north and the 73rd meridian west meet in the central western part of town.

Hartland is home to parts of three Connecticut State forests, Peoples State Forest, Tunxis State Forest, and American Legion State Forest The Barkhamsted Reservoir, which cuts through the middle of Hartland, is 11 miles long and holds approximately 30 billion gallon reservoir, and serves the primary source of drinking water for most of Hartford County. The construction of the reservoir and the Saville Dam required the relocation of over 1,000 people, four cemeteries, and numerous family farms in Hartland and Barkhamsted. In total, over 70% of Hartland's land, or over 15,500 acres, is permanently designated as open space, encompassing state forests and parks, watersheds, and public land conservation trusts.

== Demographics ==
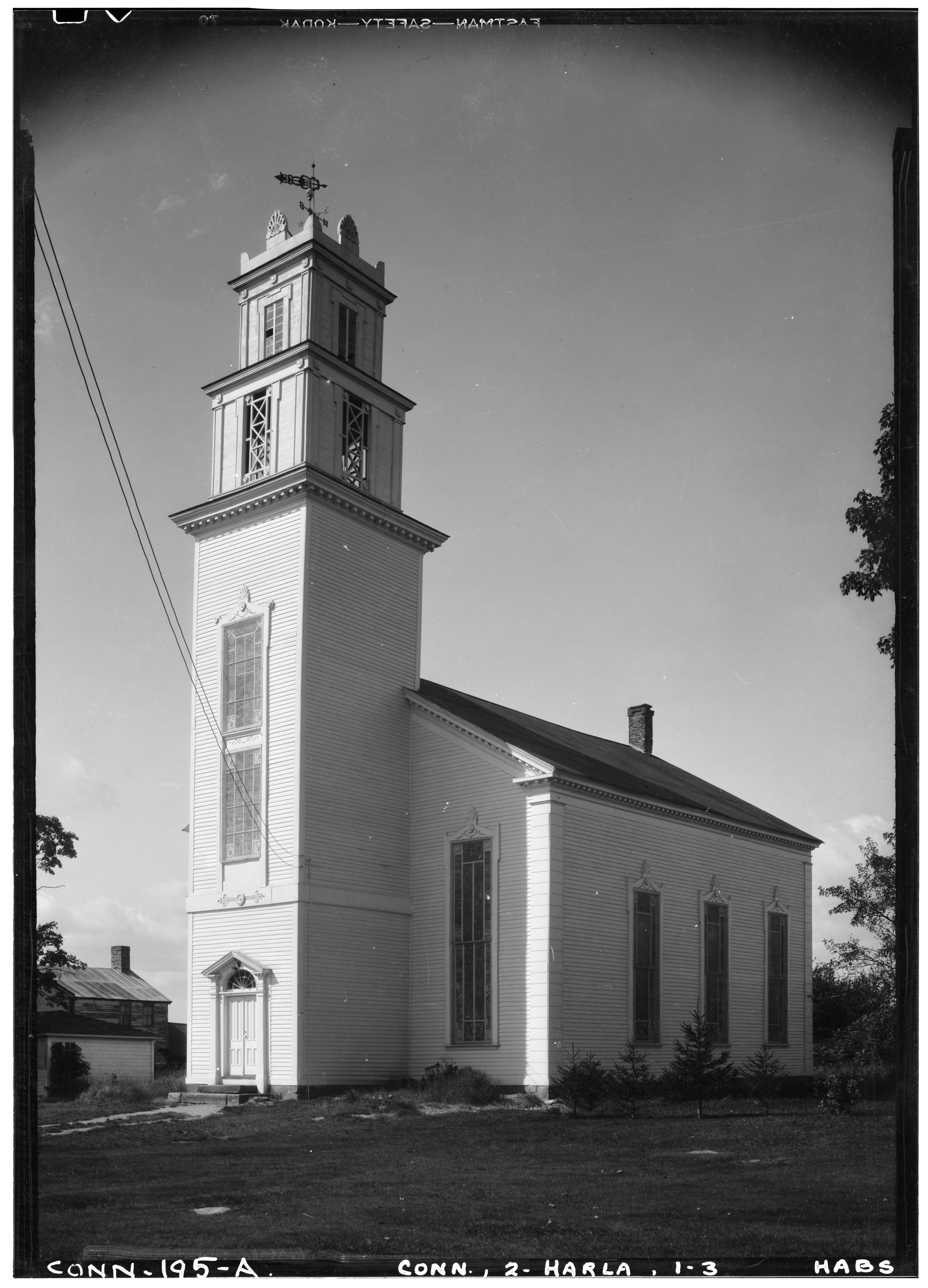
Congregational Church, East Hartland

Historical population
Census	Pop.	Note	%±
1800	1,318		—
1810	1,284		−2.6%
1820	1,254		−2.3%
1830	1,221		−2.6%
1840	1,060		−13.2%
1850	848		−20.0%
1860	846		−0.2%
1870	789		−6.7%
1880	643		−18.5%
1890	565		−12.1%
1900	592		4.8%
1910	544		−8.1%
1920	448		−17.6%
1930	296		−33.9%
1940	300		1.4%
1950	549		83.0%
1960	1,040		89.4%
1970	1,303		25.3%
1980	1,416		8.7%
1990	1,866		31.8%
2000	2,012		7.8%
2010	2,114		5.1%
2020	1,901		−10.1%

As of the U.S. Census Bureau's 2023 American Community Survey, there were 1,971 people and 818 households residing in the town. The population density was 60 people per square mile (23.2/km^{2}). There were 923 housing units, of which 840 (91%) were owner-occupied. The racial makeup of the town was 89% White, less than 1% African American, less than 1% Asian, 10% from other races and two or more races. Hispanic or Latino of any race were less than 1% of the population.

The population distribution in 2023 was 18.82% (397) age 19 and under, 8.22% (162) ages 20 to 29, 9.79% (193) ages 30 to 39, 9.49% (187) ages 40 to 49, 19.13% (377) ages 50 to 59, 22.83% (450) ages 60 to 69, 6.50% (137) ages 70 to 79, and 3.45% (68) who were 80 years of age or older. Median age was 52.

The median household income was $105,921. 2% of the population were below the poverty line. As of 2022, 2.16% (40) of the town qualified for Supplemental Nutritional Assistance Program (SNAP).

== Education ==
Educational data is provided by the Connecticut Economic Resource Center (CERC). Hartland School District consists of one school, Hartland School, Pre-K through grade eight, with an enrollment in 2017 of 162. High school students can attend any of the CREC magnet schools, State of Connecticut vocational schools, State of Connecticut vocational-agricultural schools, the town-designated public high school (Granby High School as of 2019), or receive a voucher to attend another town public high school. Because of the wide variety in high school choice, four-year cohort graduation rates were not available. From 2013 to 2017, 73.1% of students attended public school, while 26.9% attended private school. By highest education level achieved as of 2017, 32% of the town earned a high school diploma, 12% an associate degree, and 32% bachelor's degree or higher.

== Government ==
Hartland is governed by a three-person, elected Board of Selectman with supporting elected town boards for Finance, Education, and Library. The remaining boards and committees, including Planning & Zoning, Wetlands, and Recreation, are appointed by the Board of Selectman. Total Revenues for 2017 was $7,217,096, with total expenditures of $6,988,601 including $115,495 (1.7% of expenditures) for debt (bond) service. Hartland is rated A1 by Moody's and conveys a mill rate of 25.50 on a net Grand List of $198,192,769. Of the net Grand List, 1.3% is commercial/industrial.

Voter Registration and Party Enrollment as of November 5, 2018
Party	Active Voters	Inactive Voters	Total Voters	Percentage
Republican	626	29	655	40.89%
Democratic	332	15	347	21.66%
Minor Parties	31	1	32	2.00%
Unaffiliated	539	29	568	35.46%
Total	1,528	74	1,602	100%

== Politics ==
Hartland has published results for all presidential elections since 1856. From 1856 to 1876, Hartland supported Democratic candidates for president except for Abraham Lincoln received in the four-way race in 1860. Since 1880, Hartland voters have supported the Republican presidential candidate for 36 consecutive elections. As of 2022, Hartland had the largest share of registered Republican voters in the state, at 40% of the electorate.

Hartland town vote by party in presidential elections
Year	Democratic	Republican	Third Parties
2020	35.39% 457	63.66% 818	1.24% 16
2016	28.19% 349	64.94% 804	6.87% 85
2012	34.36% 414	64.56% 778	1.08% 13
2008	38.87% 496	59.25% 756	1.88% 24
2004	37.15% 435	60.46% 708	2.39% 28
2000	36.60% 388	54.81% 581	8.59% 91
1996	32.31% 317	50.56% 496	17.13% 168
1992	28.42% 303	42.96% 458	28.61% 305*
1988	35.25% 318	63.97% 577	0.78% 7
1984	22.97% 181	76.40% 602	0.63% 5
1980	25.83% 178	57.62% 397	16.55% 114
1976	33.12% 206	66.24% 412	0.64% 4
1972	21.31% 130	77.71% 474	0.98% 6
1968	26.12% 146	67.26% 376	6.62% 37
1964	43.01% 203	56.99% 269	0.00% 0
1960	21.03% 98	78.70% 362	0.00% 0
1956	13.23% 52	86.77% 341	0.00% 0
1952	17.47% 58	82.53% 274	0.00% 0
1948	21.27% 47	78.28% 173	0.45% 1
1944	25.98% 53	74.02% 151	0.00% 0
1940	31.71% 52	68.29% 112	0.00% 0
1936	27.88% 40	72.22% 104	0.00% 0
1932	24.31% 35	75.69% 109	0.00% 0
1928	17.56% 23	82.44% 108	0.00% 0
1924	17.89% 22	79.67% 98	2.44% 3
1920	18.87% 20	80.19% 85	0.94% 1
1916	38.00% 38	59.00% 59	3.00% 3
1912	38.00% 38	49.00% 49	13.00% 13
1908	25.56% 23	73.33% 66	1.11% 1
1904	23.64% 26	73.64% 81	2.73% 3
1900	23.16% 22	76.84% 73	0.00% 0
1896	20.80% 26	67.20% 84	12.00% 15
1892	35.81% 53	62.84% 93	1.35% 2
1888	42.01% 71	56.21% 95	1.78% 3
1884	45.50% 86	52.89% 100	1.59% 3
1880	48.57% 85	51.43% 90	0.00% 0
1876	64.71% 110	35.29% 60	0.00% 0
1872	61.97% 88	38.03% 54	0.00% 0
1868	60.22% 109	39.78% 72	0.00% 0
1864	55.50% 106	44.50% 85	0.00% 0
1860	39.49% 62	47.13% 74	13.38% 21
1856	49.74% 96	47.67% 92	2.59% 5

== Notable locations ==
- Hartland Historical Society & Museum
- Tunxis Forest Headquarters House
- Tunxis Forest Ski Cabin

== Notable people ==
- Asher Benjamin, architect
- Gary Burghoff, actor
- Don Winslow, author
- Theophilus Gates, religious leader
- Uriel Holmes, congressman
- Consider Tiffany, British loyalist
- John Trumbull, artist
- Cody Wolfe, country artist
