= Tunxis State Forest =

State forest in northern Connecticut, U.S.

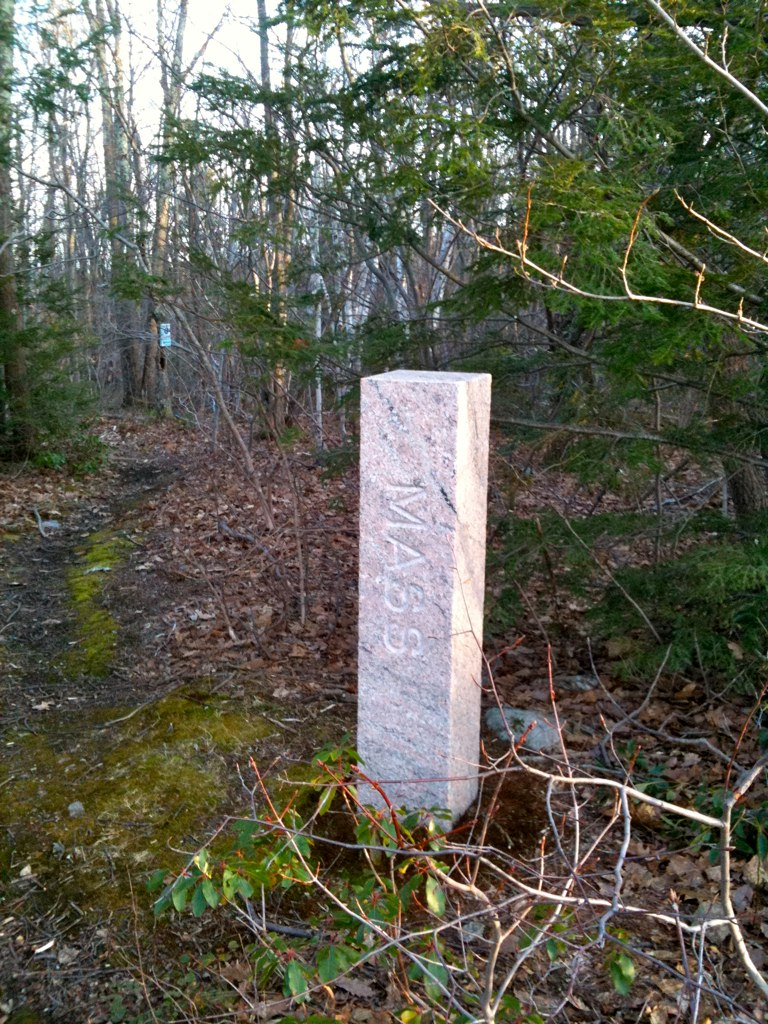
- Massachusetts-Connecticut boundary marker on northern border of Tunxis State Forest in Hartland (near northern end of Pell Road).

- Location within Connecticut Location within the United States
- Location: Hartland, Barkhamsted, and Granby, Connecticut, United States
- Coordinates: 42°01′08″N 72°57′30″W
- Area: 10,242 acres (4,145 ha)
- Elevation: 1,014 ft (309 m)
- Established: 1923
- Administrator: Connecticut Department of Energy and Environmental Protection
- Website: Tunxis State Forest

Tunxis State Forest is a state forest located in the towns of Colebrook, Hartland, Barkhamsted, and Granby in Connecticut, United States. The forest surrounds Barkhamsted Reservoir and borders the Granville State Forest in Massachusetts. Several trails cross the forest, including the northern end of the blue-blazed Tunxis Trail. The forest is used for hiking, mountain biking, cross-country skiing, fishing, and hunting. Letterboxing is no longer active in the forest.
