= Big Pond (Orange County, New York) =

- Location within New York Location within the United States
- Location: Orange County, New York
- Coordinates: 41.4682275°N 74.6610649°W
- Type: Lake
- Surface elevation: 1,319 feet (402 m)

Big Pond is a lake in the U.S. state of New York. The lake has a surface area of 77 acres (31 ha).
