= Otter River (Massachusetts) =

Tributary of the Millers River in Massachusetts

Coordinates: 42°38′10″N 72°05′38″W

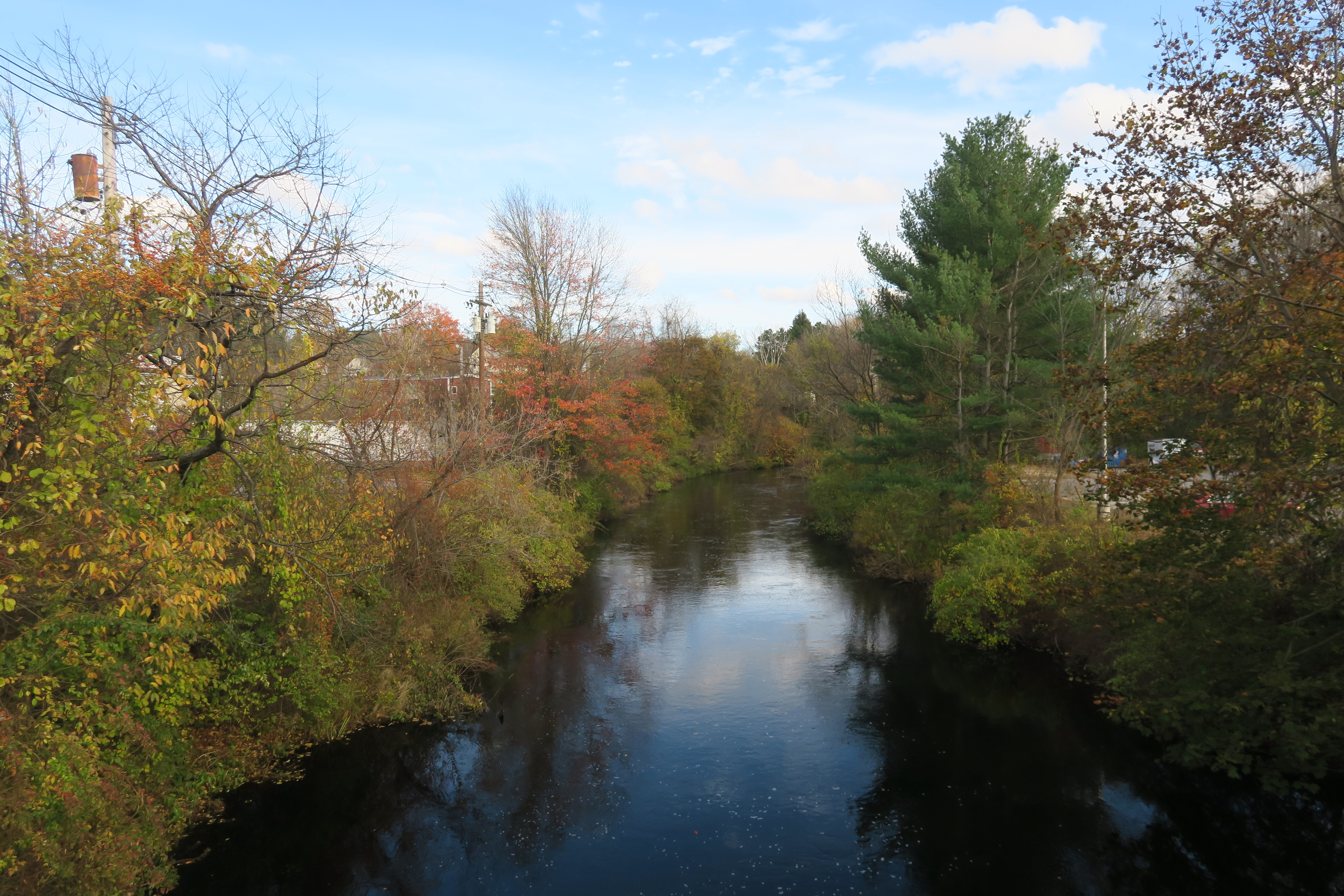
In Baldwinville

The Otter River is a river in Massachusetts that flows approximately 10 miles and is a major tributary of the Millers River which in turn is a tributary of the Connecticut River. The Otter River enters the Millers River in Winchendon in Otter River State Forest. Otter River is also a precinct village in the town of Templeton bordering Gardner, Winchendon, Baldwinville, and East Templeton.
