= John Boynton =

John Boynton may refer to:

- John F. Boynton (1811–1890), early leader in the Latter Day Saint movement and American geologist and inventor
- John Keyworth Boynton (1918–2007), British legal officer
- John Boynton (Worcester Polytechnic Institute) (1791–1868), American tinware entrepreneur and founder of Worcester Polytechnic Institute
- John Boynton (American football), American football player
