= Lake Dennison Recreation Area =

State park in Winchendon, Massachusetts

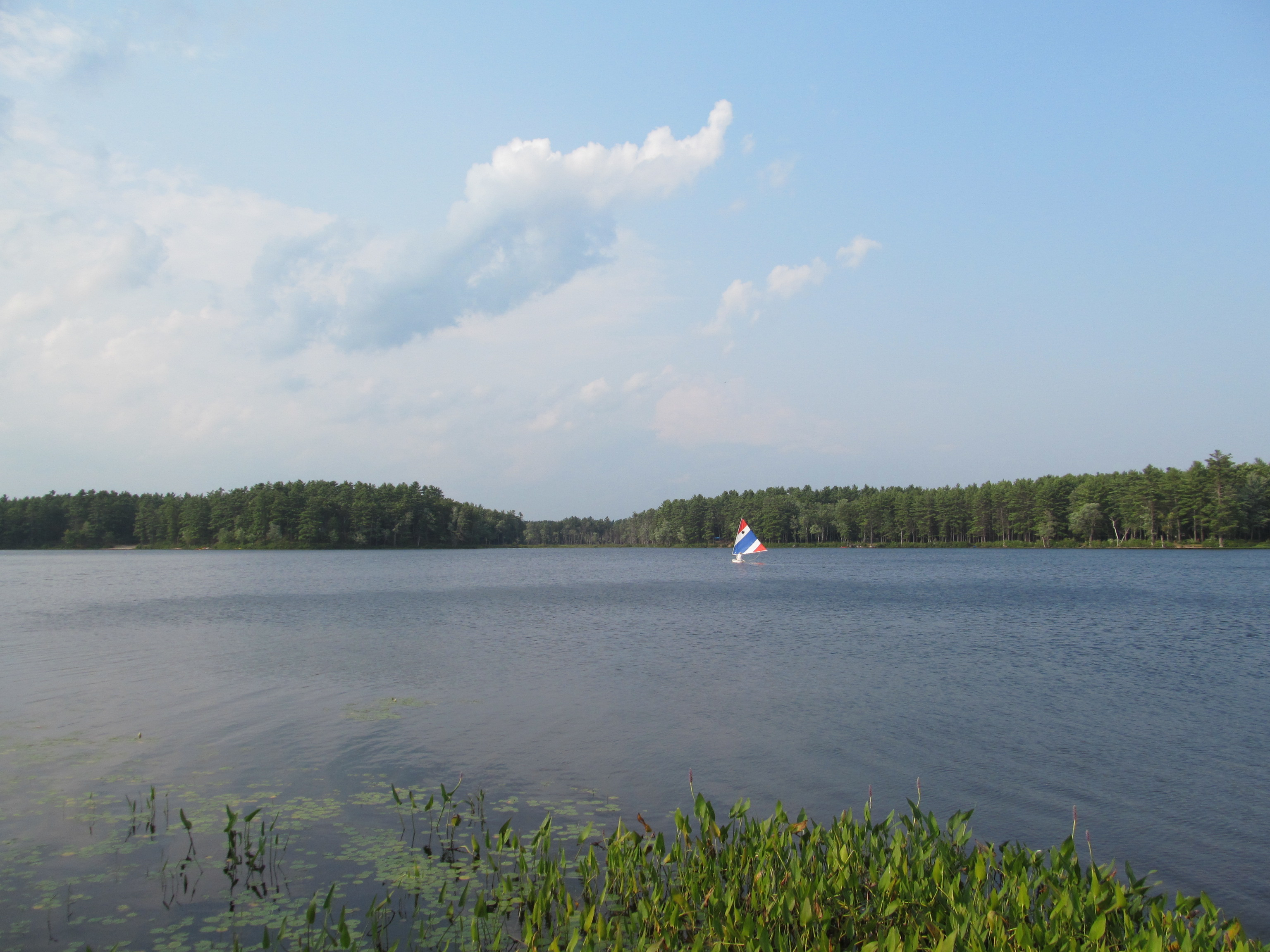
- Lake Dennison

- Location within Massachusetts Location within the United States
- Location: Winchendon, Massachusetts, United States
- Coordinates: 42°38′39″N 72°05′16″W
- Area: 121 acres (49 ha)
- Elevation: 820 ft (250 m)
- Administrator: Massachusetts Department of Conservation and Recreation
- Website: Official website

Lake Dennison Recreation Area is a 121-acre (49 ha) Massachusetts state park located in the town of Winchendon. It comprises a small portion of the 4,221 acres (1,708 ha) of the U.S. Army Corps of Engineers' Birch Hill Flood Control Project that are managed by the Department of Conservation and Recreation and that also include Otter River State Forest.

== Activities and amenities ==
Lake Dennison offers a swimming beach, restrooms, pavilion, picnic areas, fishing, and boat ramp for non-motorized craft. The park has 150 campsites plus trails for hiking, horseback riding, cross-country skiing, and snowmobiling.
