= North Branch Millers River =

Tributary of the Millers River in New England

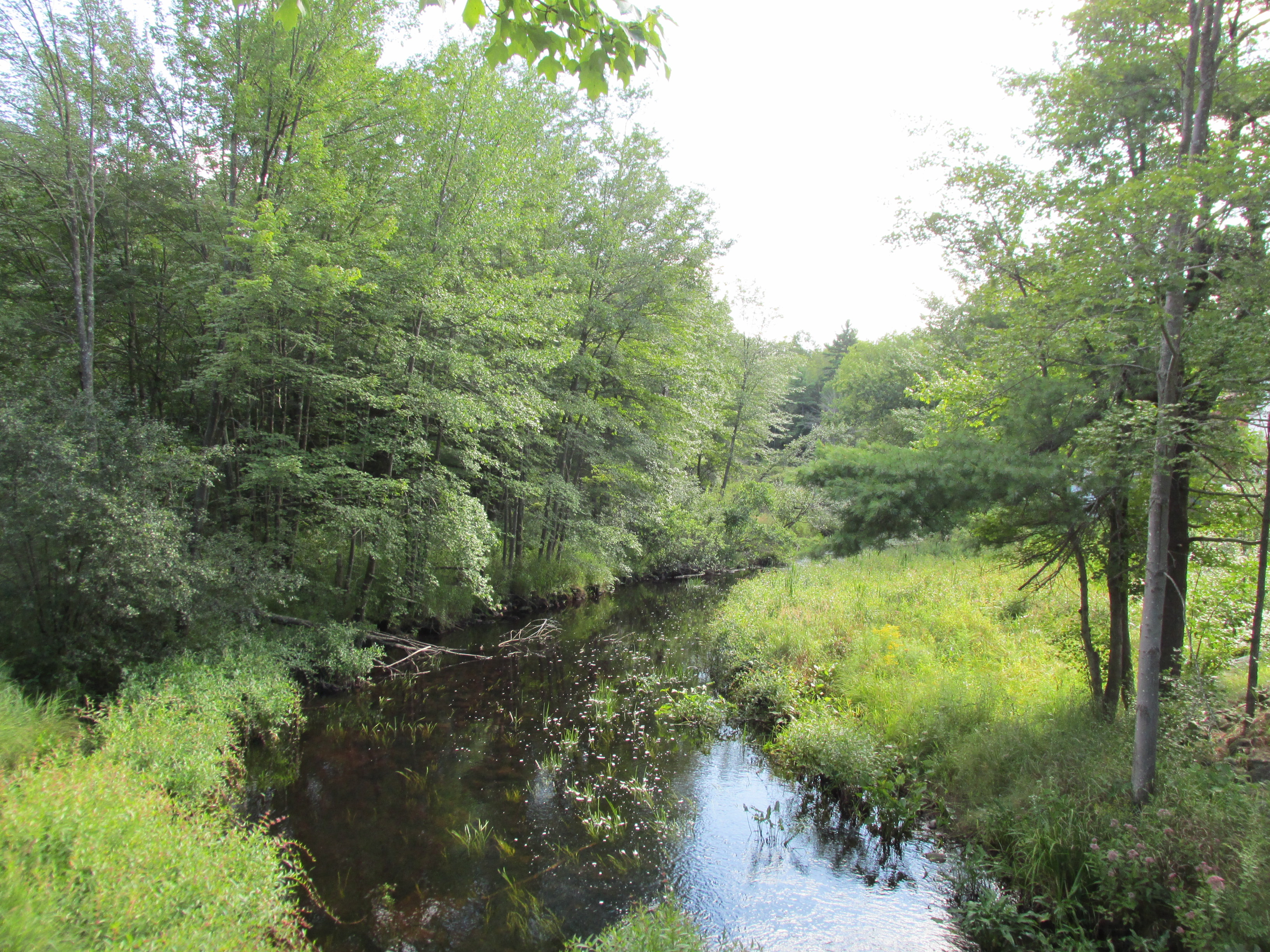
- The North Branch at Winchendon Springs

- Location within Massachusetts Location within New Hampshire Location within the United States

Location
- Country: United States
- States: New Hampshire, Massachusetts
- Counties: Hillsborough, NH, Cheshire, NH, Worcester, MA
- Towns: New Ipswich, NH, Rindge, NH, Winchendon, MA

Physical characteristics
- Source: Mountain Pond
  - location: New Ipswich, NH
  - coordinates: 42°44′55″N 71°55′48″W
  - elevation: 1,257 ft (383 m)
- Mouth: Whitney Pond, Millers River
  - location: Winchendon, MA
  - coordinates: 42°40′54″N 72°1′41″W
  - elevation: 972 ft (296 m)
- Length: 6.0 mi (9.7 km)

The North Branch of the Millers River is a river in southwestern New Hampshire and northern Massachusetts in the United States. It is a tributary of the Millers River, which flows west to the Connecticut River, which in turn flows south to Long Island Sound, an arm of the Atlantic Ocean.

The North Branch rises in New Ipswich, New Hampshire, at the outlet of Mountain Pond. It flows west through Island Pond into Rindge, and passes the villages of East Rindge and Converseville to Lake Monomonac. From the lake's outlet in Massachusetts, the North Branch flows south parallel to U.S. Route 202, joining the Millers River at Whitney Pond in Winchendon.

The North Branch is 6.0 miles (9.7 km) long, 4.0 miles (6.4 km) of which are in New Hampshire, with 2.0 miles (3.2 km) in Massachusetts. If the channel length of 2.9 miles (4.7 km) through Lake Monomonac were included, the total length would be 8.9 miles (14.3 km).

== See also ==
- List of rivers of Massachusetts
- List of rivers of New Hampshire
