= Narragansett Regional High School =

Location
- 464 Baldwinville Road; Templeton, Massachusetts 01436; United States; 42°35′17″N 72°04′23″W

Information
- Type: Public secondary Open enrollment
- Motto: Crescat scientia (Let Knowledge Grow)
- Established: 1955
- Superintendent: Christopher Casavant
- Teaching staff: 36.05 (FTE)
- Grades: 8-12
- Enrollment: 475 (2023–2024)
- Student to teacher ratio: 13.18
- Campus type: Rural
- Colors: Royal Blue, White & Silver
- Athletics conference: Midland Wachusett League
- Nickname: Gansett Warriors
- Yearbook: Arrow Yearbook
- Communities served: Templeton, Phillipston
- Website: www.nrsd.org/o/nrhs

Narragansett Regional High School (NRHS) is a US public high school serving students from the towns of Templeton, Massachusetts and Phillipston, Massachusetts, United States. The Narragansett Regional School District superintendent is Christopher Casavant. The school is located in Baldwinville, a village that is part of Templeton.

In 2010, a multimillion-dollar project to erect a 1.5 megawatt wind turbine was completed behind the school's practice field. The turbine was named after John LeClerc, a middle school technology teacher. The LeClerc Wind Turbine serves as the finish area for the LeClerc Wind Turbine 5K. The race is run annually on the first Saturday in August as a scholarship benefit for Narragansett Cross Country Runners.

== Athletics ==
Cheering; Basketball (girls and boys); Football; Soccer (girls and boys); Ice hockey (co-op with Gardner); Swimming; Softball; Baseball; Field Hockey; Track (winter and spring); Marching Band; and Cross Country.
