= NAFCA =

NAFCA may refer to:

- Nollywood and African Film Critics Awards
- North American Family Campers Association
