= Millers River =

River in Massachusetts, United States

Coordinates: 42°35′50″N 72°29′48″W

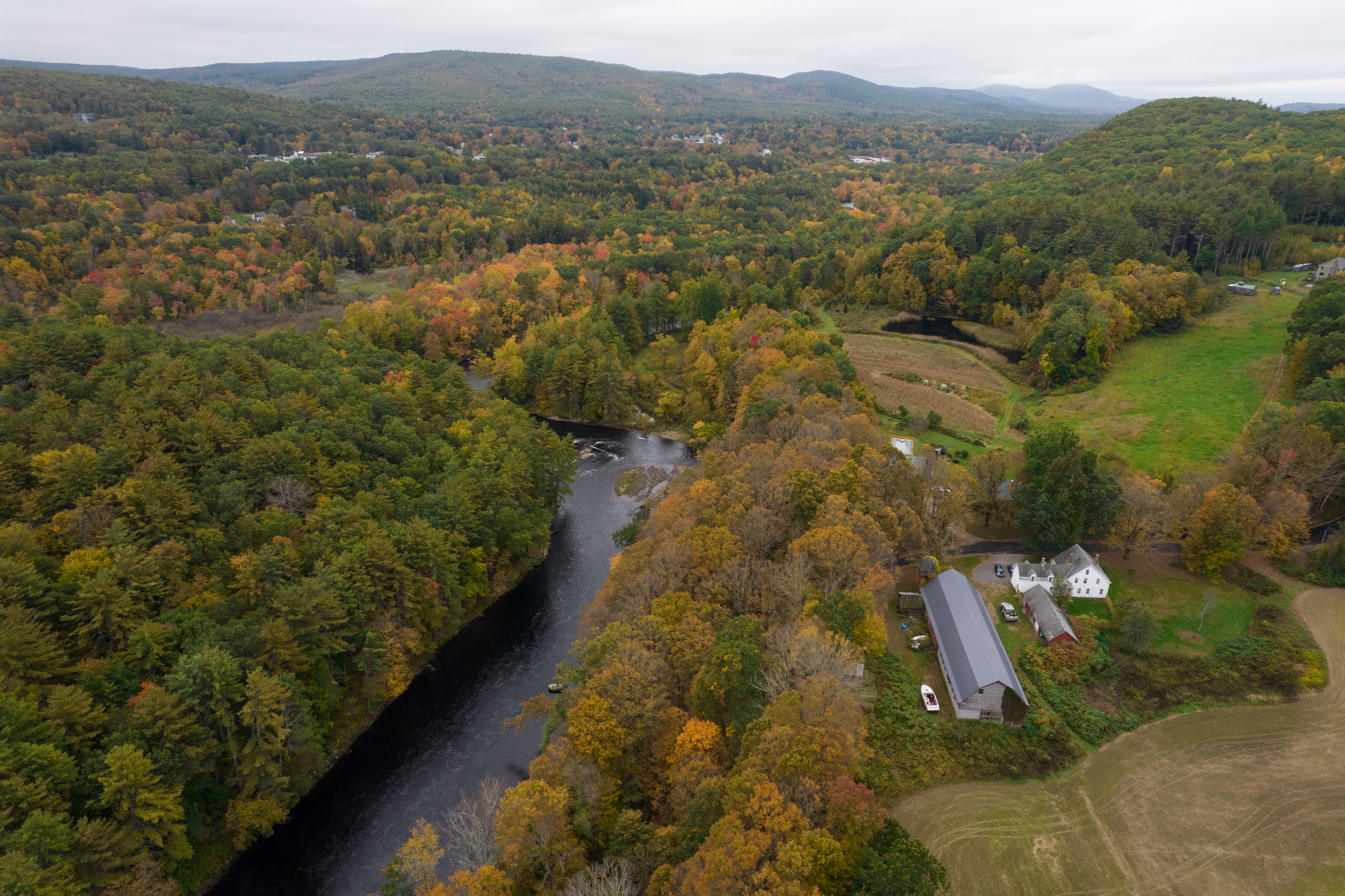
- Millers River at Millers Falls, Massachusetts

Physical characteristics
- Source
  - location: Confluence of Bear Meadow Brook and Bluefield Brook, Ashburnham, Massachusetts
  - elevation: 1,124 feet (343 m)
- Mouth
  - location: Connecticut River at Millers Falls, Massachusetts
  - elevation: 175 feet (53 m)
- Length: 52 mi (84 km)
- Basin size: 390 mi^{2} (1,000 km^{2})
- Discharge
  - average: 1,000 cu ft/s (28 m^{3}/s)

The Millers River is a 52.1-mile-long (83.8 km) river in northern Massachusetts, originating in Ashburnham and joining the Connecticut River just downstream from Millers Falls. Sections of the river are used for whitewater kayaking, and a section upriver is popular with flatwater racers (canoe racing), and the river is known locally as a good place for pike fishing.

== Native names ==
The river was formerly known as Papacontuckquash, a Nipmuc word meaning "split banks river", from papahe ("split"), akun ("bank"), tekw ("river"), and esh, a plural marker. Papacontuckquash is cited as the name for the Miller's River, signed and witnessed by the Native leaders on the "Indian Land Deeds for Hampshire County, Later Including Franklin . . . ", where it is also noted that this name is given on "an ancient map" in the collections of Williams College. Additionally, Papcontuckquash is given by Sonskqua Mishalisk, 17th century Pocumtuck leader, as the name for the Miller's River.

Some have assigned "Paquag", "Baqaug", or "Pacquoag" as the name of the river. However, "Paquoag" refers to the location of the town of Athol. This identification was confirmed by Kchisogmo (Grand Chief) Henry Lorne Masta in 1932 as Pakwaik, meaning "arrows place", for the arrowwood (Viburnum dentatum) that grew there, used for making arrow shafts. The term Pachaug refers to "clear water" in Nipmuc for a creek and meadow in Squakheag, now Northfield, where the word displays the palatization of "k" that conforms to the northern and western dialect of Nipmuk, as indicated by Holly Gustafson in Nipmuk Grammar, and confirmed in Dr. Ives Goddard's "The 'Loup' Languages of Western Massachusetts: The Dialectal Diversity of Southern New England Algonquian", while Pacoag retains the unpalatized feature associated with Massachusett and Natick dialect and is associated on land documents with Rutland in Worcester County.

== Topography ==
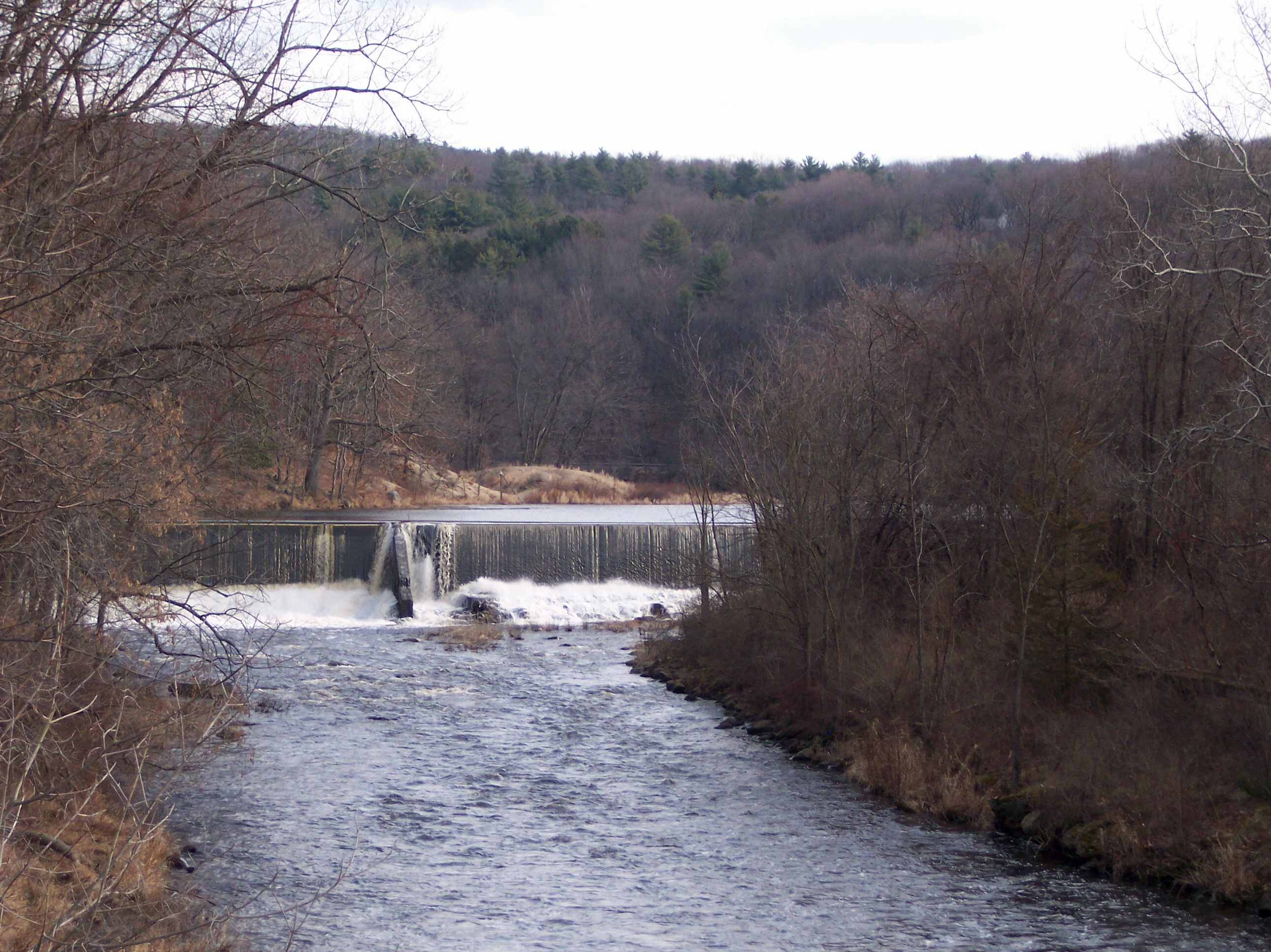
The Millers River at Athol, MA

The Millers River drains a total area of about 390 square miles (1,000 km^{2}), about 313 square miles (810 km^{2}) of which are in Massachusetts, with the remainder in New Hampshire. About 78 percent of the basin is forested, 11 percent is open land, 8 percent is wetland, and 3 percent contains urban areas. The watershed is made up of all or part of 17 municipalities, with a population of approximately 87,000 people. Population centers within the watershed are concentrated around Winchendon, Gardner, Athol, and Orange.

Many wetlands in the basin indicate areas of former shallow lakes and ponds that have gradually been filled. There are a total of 107 lakes and ponds in the basin, 72 of which have an area of 10 acres (40,000 m^{2}) or more. Only one lake, 592-acre (2.40 km^{2}) Lake Monomonac in Winchendon, Massachusetts, and Rindge, New Hampshire, is larger than 500 acres (2.0 km^{2}).

== Origin ==
The Millers River formed at the end of the last glacial period when several glacial lakes joined and, eventually, drained into the Connecticut River. The river's headwaters are in Ashburnham, Massachusetts, and the headwaters of the North Branch are in Mountain Pond, at the western foot of the Wapack Range in New Ipswich, New Hampshire.

== Course and connecting waterways ==
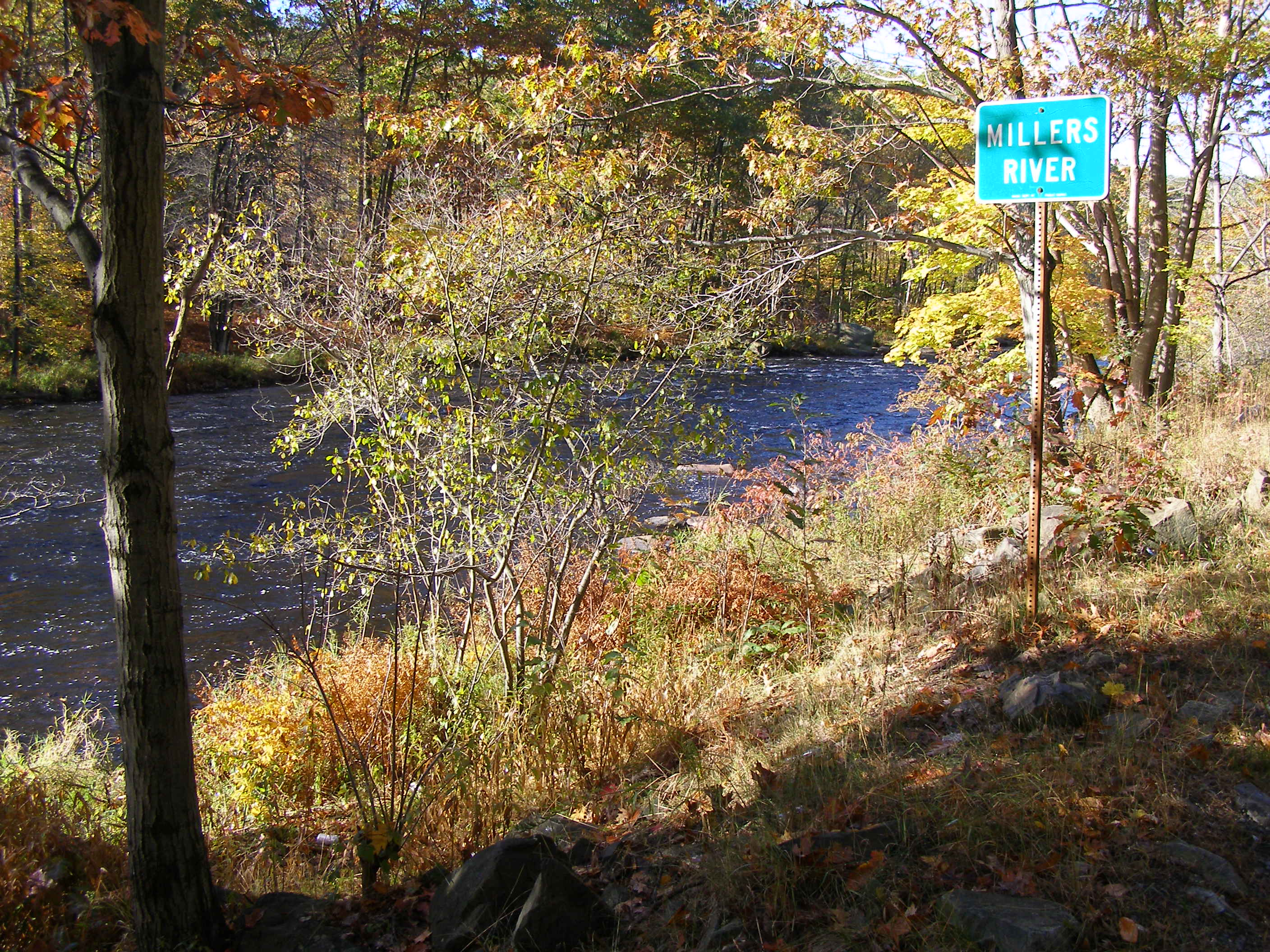
Millers River near Erving at autumn

The North Branch and the main stem of the river join in Winchendon, and the river flows westward to the Connecticut River. Major tributaries of the Millers River are Tarbell Brook, which enters about two miles west of Winchendon Center, the Otter River, which enters in Winchendon in Otter River State Forest, and the Tully River, which enters in Athol. These tributaries flow mainly through wetlands. Overall, the Millers River has a moderate gradient, averaging about 18 feet/mile from the headwaters area to the USGS streamflow-gaging station at Erving, a stream distance of about 43 miles (69 km).

However, a 5-mile (8.0 km) reach of the Millers River through a wooded area between South Royalston and Athol (the "Bear's Den") has an average gradient of about 43 feet/mile, which is about five times the average for rivers in Massachusetts, and some of the most rugged and steep terrain of the state's central upland. The gradient of the tributary Otter River averages about 18 feet/mile for a distance of about 11.5 miles (18.5 km), and that of the East Branch Tully River, the major tributary of the Tully River, averages about 52 feet/mile over a distance of about 13 miles (21 km).

== Birch Hill Dam ==
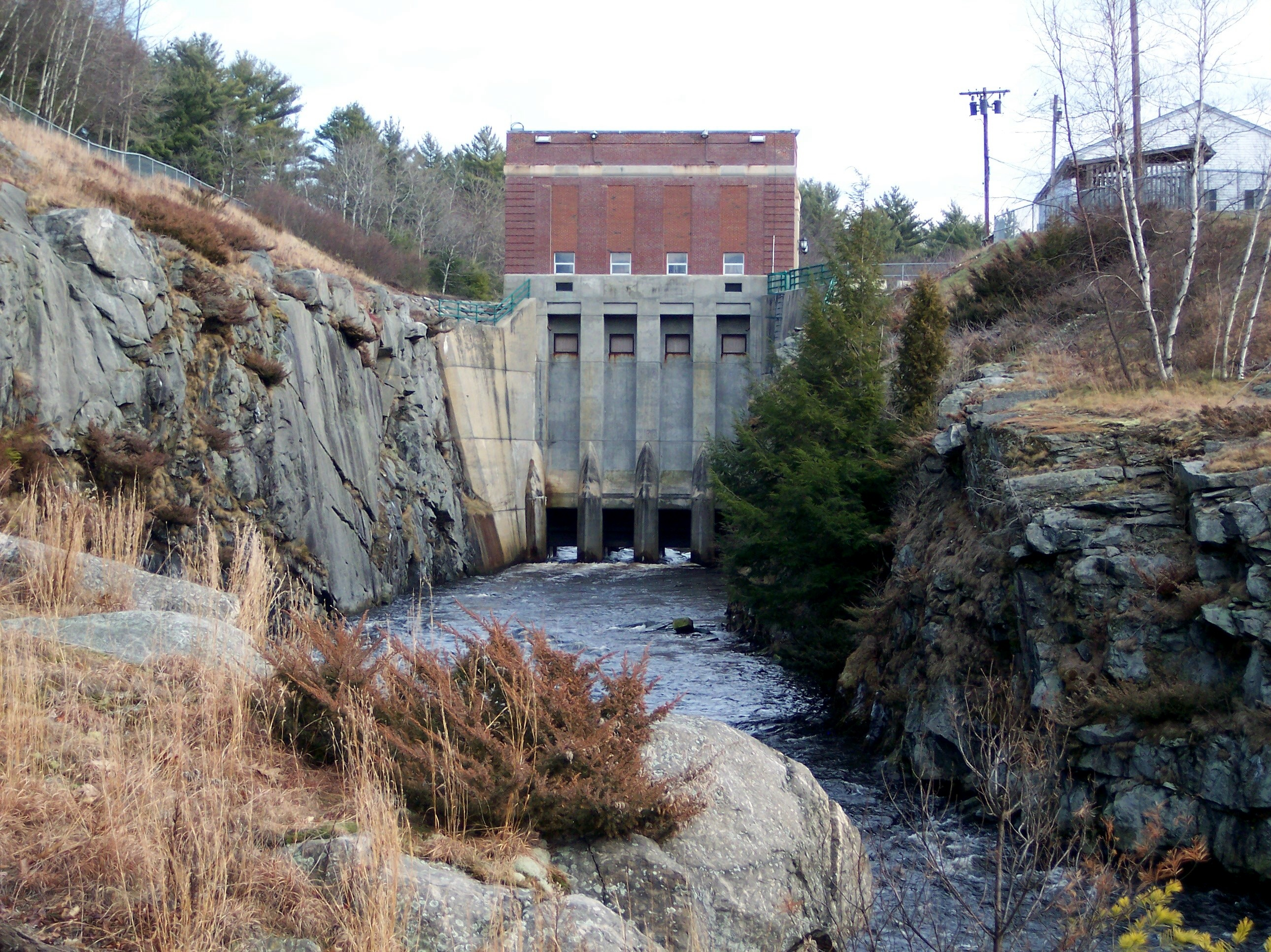
Birch Hill Dam on the Millers River

The Birch Hill Dam is a flood control dam located on the Millers River in South Royalston, Massachusetts. It is a part of a network of flood control dams on tributaries of the Connecticut River. Completed in 1941 at a cost of US$4 million, Birch Hill Dam was one of the first dams the Army Corps of Engineers built in New England to prevent floods like those that devastated Athol and Orange in 1936 and 1938. It has a storage capacity of 16.3 billion US gallons (62,000,000 m^{3}).

The Reservoir Regulation Team (RRT) is the "nerve center" for the New England flood control dams such as Birch Hill Dam. Using radio and satellite communications, RRT constantly monitors river levels and weather conditions that influence flood control decisions. Corps personnel, in conjunction with RRT, regulate the amount of water released downstream by raising or lowering the four 6 ft (1.8 m) by 12 ft (3.7 m) gates located in the gatehouse at the dam. In a time of high water, the gates are lowered in order to hold back the water, only to be released when downstream river conditions begin to recede. In April 1987, two storms dropped over 6 inches (150 mm) of rain, raising the water level to over 33 feet (10 m) at the dam, utilizing 80% of the storage capacity. It is estimated that Birch Hill Dam prevented over $9 million in damages to downstream property from this one storm.

== See also ==
- List of rivers of Massachusetts
