= List of music festivals in Massachusetts =

This is a list of music festivals in Massachusetts, United States, both ongoing and defunct.

- Amesbury Harvest Fair and Country Music Festival
- Aston Magna Music Festival
- Boston Calling Music Festival
- Boston Early Music Festival
- Byfield Music & Arts Festival
- Cape Cod Chamber Music Festival
- Chicopee Downtown Get Down
- Downtown Brockton Arts and Music Festival
- Festival at the Farm
- Freshgrass Festival
- Gloucester Harvest Music Festival
- Green River Festival
- HONK! Music Festival
- Jam & Jest Fest
- Lakeville Arts & Music Festival
- Levitate Music and Arts Festival
- Life is Good Arts and Music Festival
- Lowell Folk Festival
- Narrows Winter Blues Festival
- New Bedford Folk Festival
- New England Blues Summit
- New England Folk Festival
- Newburyport Riverfront Music Festival
- Nice, A Fest
- North River Blues Festival
- Remember September Music Festival
- South Mountain Concerts
- South Shore Country Festival
- South Shore Indie Music Festival
- Tanglewood Music Festival
- The New England Festy
- Vinegrass at Truro Vineyards
- Winchendon Music Festival
- Worcester Music Festival
- World's Peace Jubilee and International Musical Festival
- Wormtown Music Festival
- Yellow Dog Music Fest
- Ziontific Summer Solstice Music Festival
