= Ichabod Washburn =

American businessman (1798–1868)

John Boynton (left) and Ichabod Washburn (right)

Ichabod Washburn (1798–1868) was an American Congregational deacon and industrialist from Worcester County, Massachusetts. His financial endowments led to the naming of Washburn College, now Washburn University in Topeka, Kansas, and the founding of Worcester Polytechnic Institute in Worcester, Massachusetts.

Washburn became an apprentice in a Leicester, Massachusetts blacksmith shop at the age of sixteen. He attended Leicester Academy with his distant relative Emory Washburn (later Governor of Massachusetts) and Stephen Salisbury II, both of whom would many years later help in the founding of Worcester Polytechnic Institute.

By 1865, Washburn was co-proprietor (with his son-in-law Philip Moen) of Washburn and Moen Manufacturing Company, the world's largest wire mill. The company manufactured piano wire, crinoline and supports for hoop skirts, wire for fences and other similar products.

== Worcester Polytechnic Institute ==
Washburn was interested in setting up a vocational school for mechanics and wrote:

I have long been satisfied that a course of instruction might be adopted in the education of apprentices to mechanical employments, whereby moral and intellectual training might be united with the processes by which the arts of mechanism as well as skill in the use and adaptation of tools and machinery are taught, so as to elevate our mechanics as a class in the scale of intelligence and influence, and add to their personal independence and happiness, while it renders them better and more useful citizens, and so more like our Divine Master, whose youth combined the conversations of the learned with the duties of a mechanic's son, and whose ideas and teachings now underlie the civilization of the world.

Along with John Boynton, another prominent Worcester industrialist, he founded the Worcester County Free Institute of Industrial Science in 1865. Its name was later changed to Worcester Polytechnic Institute. The collaboration between Boynton, who wanted to teach science, and Washburn, who wanted to teach vocational skills, led to the university's philosophy of "theory and practice."

Washburn suffered a paralyzing stroke in February 1868 and died on December 31 of that year, only a month after the Institute opened and before the completion of the shop building. Boynton died before the first class entered in 1868. Their contributions to WPI in its infancy are memorialized by Boynton Hall and Washburn Shops, the first two buildings on the campus.

"The Ichabod", Washburn University's mascot

== Washburn University ==
Lincoln College, established in 1865 in Topeka, Kansas, changed its name in 1868 to Washburn college after receiving a bequest of $25,000 from Ichabod Washburn's estate.

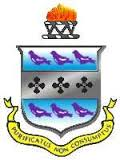
Washburn College adopted a variation of the Washbourne arms as its emblem, substituting the school colors for the tinctures of the arms. Today, the Washburn Crest is only used in an official capacity as approved by the President's office. A stylized "W" with "Washburn" across the center, known as the "Spirit W" is now more frequently used. The school mascot, "The Ichabod", is still in use and very much beloved. On campus in front of the Memorial Union is a statue of Mr. Ichabod Washburn in honor of his generous gift that saved the college from closing.

"The Ichabod" existed only in name until 1938, when alumnus (and later prominent graphic artist) Bradbury Thompson created the studious-looking, tailcoat-wearing figure the university uses today. The athletic teams are nicknamed "the Ichabods".
