= Dudley W. Adams =

American surveyor (1831–1897)

- Born: Dudley Warren Adams; November 30, 1831; Winchendon, Massachusetts, U.S.
- Died: February 13, 1897 (aged 65); Tangerine, Florida, U.S.
- Occupation: Horticulturalist
- Spouse: Hannah Heustis (m. 1856)
- Parents: Joseph Boynton Adams; Hannah Whitney

Dudley Warren Adams (November 30, 1831 in Winchendon, Worcester County, Massachusetts – February 13, 1897 in Tangerine, Florida) was a horticulturalist and a leader in the Granger movement.

== Background and career development ==
Adams was born in 1831 to Joseph Boynton Adams and Hannah Whitney. At age 4 he moved with his widowed mother and siblings to a farm where he spent his childhood. His mother later married Morace Whitcombe of Winchendon. Dudley became a teacher as a young man and, at age 21, traveled west and became one of the first settlers of Waukon, Allamakee County, Iowa.

== Role in the Grange movement ==
In Iowa, Adams learned surveying and was the county's assessor for 10 years. He created the "Iron Clad Nursery" in 1856, which was counted as one of the best tree nurseries in the area, and a top Grain Belt 4,000-tree orchard for that time. He then became a top promoter of the Grange and in 1873 was elected National President of the organization. He headed the first attempt to legislate railroad freight and aided in framing proposals for fixing rates and outlawing discrimination on that basis. These efforts were introduced into the United States Congress of 1873–1874, which at the time, had no such legislation due to opposition based upon unconstitutionality.

However, such a proposition was upheld and passed into law in the Iowa Congress. The resulting conflict brought about federal and state regulation of the railroad industry.

== Florida citrus pioneer ==
Adams went to Florida to seek relief from bronchitis in 1875. In rural northwest Orange County, he found an idyllic spot near the eastern shore of Lake Beauclaire, which he immortalized in poetry:

In the radiant west, the magic glow
Reflects itself in the lake below;
The rainbow clouds have each shining fold
Richly embroidered 'round with gold,
O! where on earth is a scene more fair
Than a sunset view on Lake Beauclaire?

Adams built a cabin on the spot about the same time and built a permanent home there in about 1882. Then he planted a large orange grove, and a small village called "Lake Ola" grew up around it. At the suggestion of his sister-in-law Bessie Heustis, the name was changed to "Tangerine." He also named nearby Lake Angelina for his younger half-sister, Angelina Whitcombe.

In Florida, Adams was credited with organizing the Tangerine Development Society in 1885 and dedicating a community school in 1886. He was also appointed to a committee to publish a booklet about Orange County for distribution at the Cotton States and International Exposition in Atlanta in 1895. But he was best known locally for organizing and presiding over Florida's State Horticultural Society until his death. Through his efforts, citrus growers were encouraged to bud their root stock and develop improved varieties.

Adams was married January 31, 1856, at Winchendon, Massachusetts, to Hannah Heustis, a native of Yarmouth, Nova Scotia, Canada. They had no children.

In 1970, Adams was inducted into the Florida Citrus Hall of Fame.

== See also ==
- Order of the Sovereigns of Industry
