= Otter River State Forest =

Protected area in Massachusetts, United States

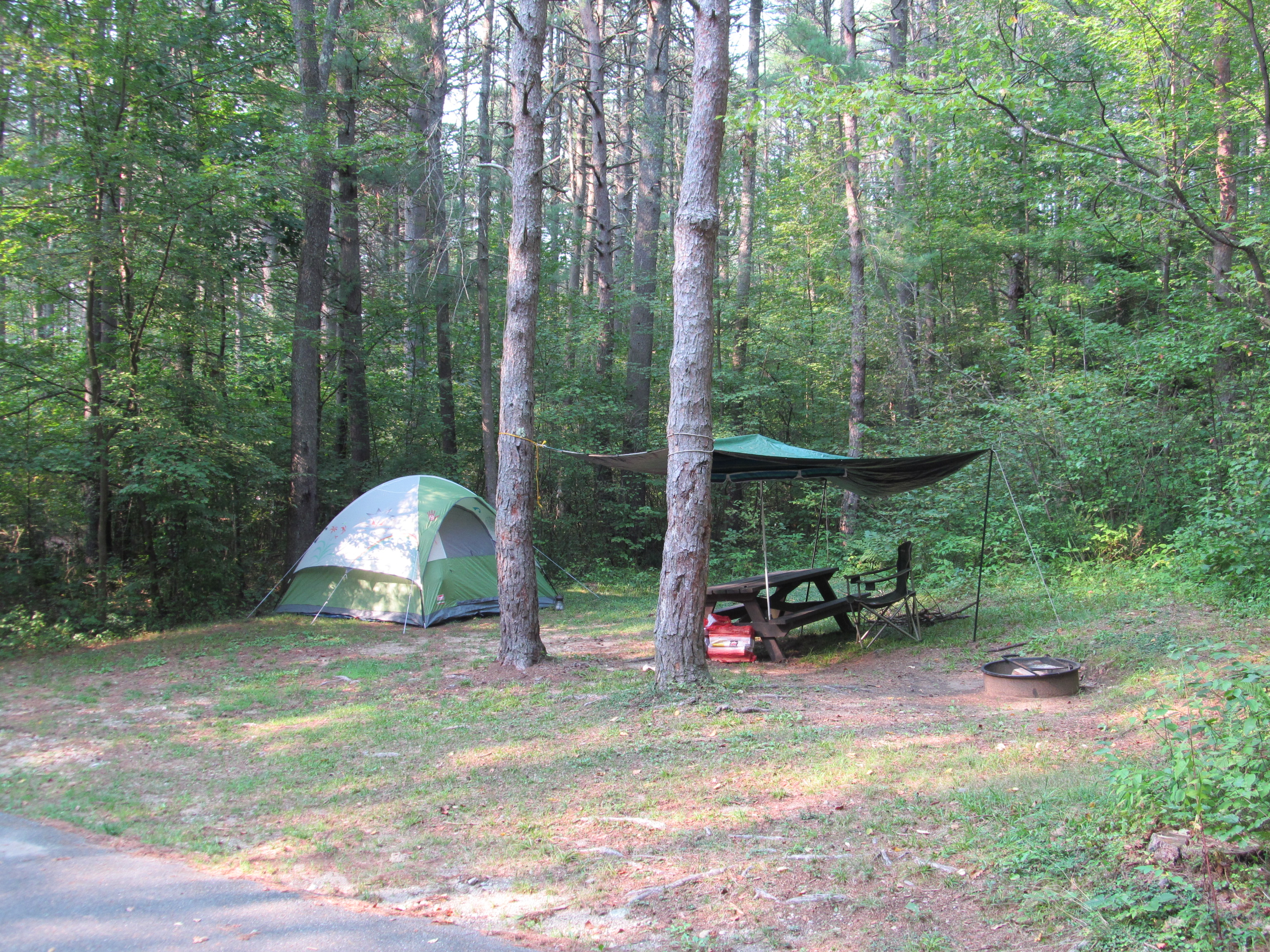

- Location within Massachusetts Location within the United States
- Location: Templeton, Winchendon and Royalston, Massachusetts, United States
- Coordinates: 42°38′39″N 72°05′16″W
- Area: 1,022 acres (414 ha)
- Elevation: 820 ft (250 m)
- Established: 1915
- Administrator: Massachusetts Department of Conservation and Recreation
- Website: Official website

Otter River State Forest is a publicly owned forest and recreational preserve located in the towns of Templeton, Winchendon, and Royalston in Massachusetts managed by the Massachusetts Department of Conservation and Recreation. The state forest encompasses the land surrounding the junction of the Otter and Millers rivers. Habitats include freshwater marsh, northern hardwood stands, and pine groves planted by the Civilian Conservation Corps to reforest former farmlands.

== History ==
The forest was the first property acquired by the State Forest Commission in 1915; it was formally established in 1917. A 100-year birthday celebration was held on the forest grounds in August 2015.

The Civilian Conservation Corps was active in the forest during the 1930s. The Corps' handiwork can be seen in the dam at the northern end of Beaman Pond and the visitor contact station on the east side of the pond. The pond's Corps-built stone bathhouse no longer exists.

The camping club that formed at Otter River State Forest as the New England Campers Association in 1957 and known today as the North American Family Campers Association maintains a brick garden to remember members and chapters. A garden bench is dedicated to former NAFCA President, Roger Swallow (1941-2007).

== Activities and amenities ==
The developed portion of the forest is accessed from Winchendon Road (Rt 202) on the north side of the village of Baldwinville. Facilities centered on Beaman Pond include a swimming beach, ballfield, picnicking areas, and pavilion. Handicapped-accessible facilities include restrooms and showers. The trail system is used for hiking, mountain biking, and cross-country skiing. The forest also offers camping, fishing, restricted hunting, and interpretive programs.
