= Templeton, Massachusetts =

- Town
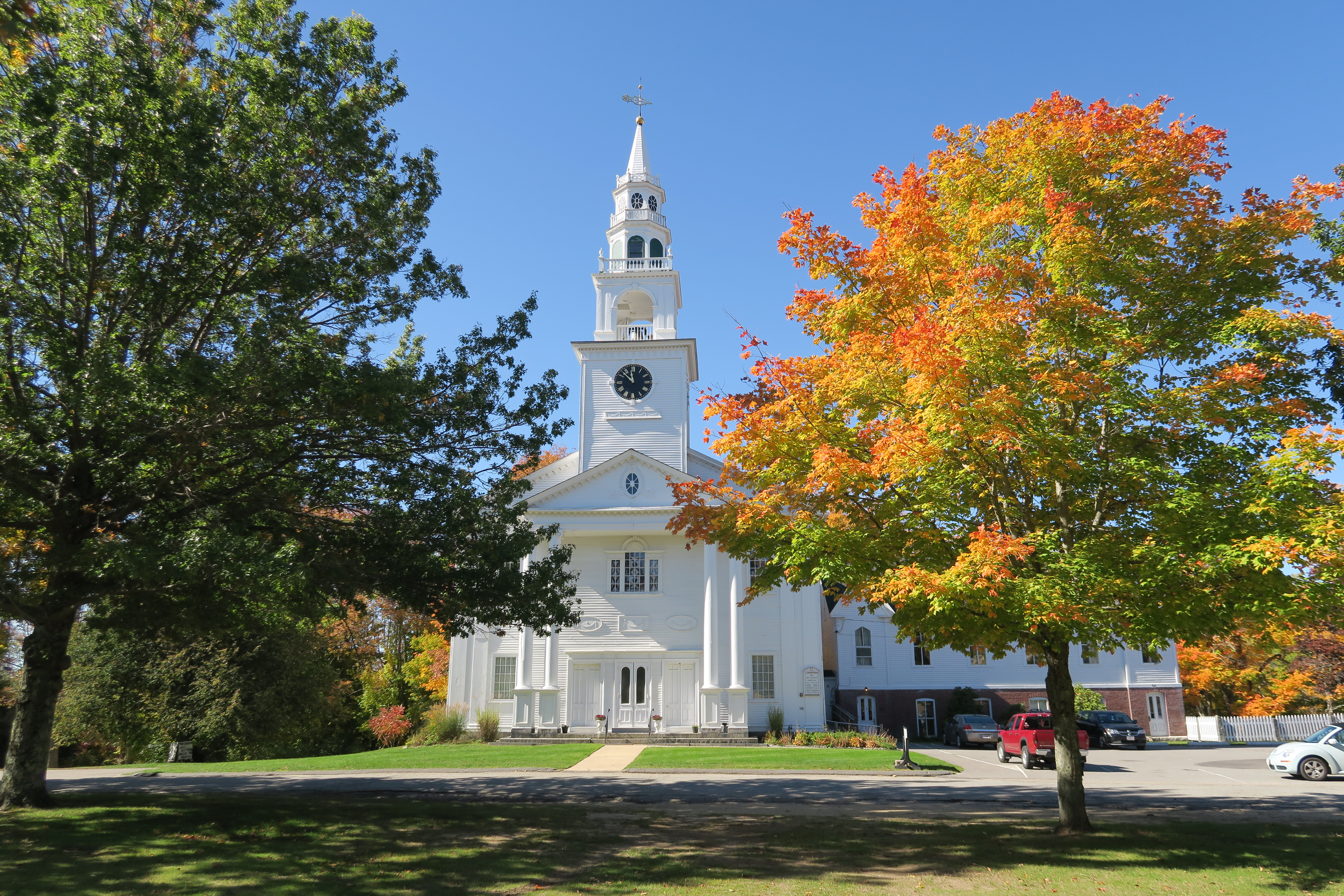
- First Church of Templeton

- Seal
- Motto: "Industry"
- Location in Worcester County and Massachusetts.
- Coordinates: 42°33′20″N 72°04′05″W
- Country: United States
- State: Massachusetts
- County: Worcester
- Settled: 1751
- Incorporated: 1762

Government
  - Type: Open town meeting
  - Select Board Chair: Jeffery Bennett, Chair (2027)
  - Select Board: Timothy Toth, Vice Chair (2029); Candace Graves, Member (2028); April Cover, Clerk (2029); Robert May, Member (2028)

Area
  - Total: 32.4 sq mi (83.9 km^{2})
  - Land: 32.0 sq mi (83.0 km^{2})
  - Water: 0.39 sq mi (1.0 km^{2})
- Elevation: 1,142 ft (348 m)

Population (2020)
  - Total: 8,149
  - Density: 254/sq mi (98.2/km^{2})
- Time zone: UTC−5 (Eastern)
  - Summer (DST): UTC−4 (Eastern)
- ZIP Codes: 01468 (Templeton); 01436 (Baldwinville); 01438 (East Templeton); 01440 (Gardner)
- Area code: 351/978
- FIPS code: 25-69275
- GNIS feature ID: 0619492
- Website: www.templetonma.gov

Templeton is a town in Worcester County, Massachusetts, United States. The population was 8,149 at the 2020 census. The town comprises four main villages: Templeton Center, East Templeton, Baldwinville, and Otter River.

== Geography ==
According to the United States Census Bureau, the town has a total area of 32.4 square miles (84 km^{2}), of which 32.0 square miles (83 km^{2}) is land and 0.4 square miles (1.0 km^{2}), or 1.17%, is water.

Templeton is bordered by Royalston and Winchendon to the north, Gardner to the east, Hubbardston to the southeast, and Phillipston to the west.

== Demographics ==
Historical population
Year	Pop.	±%
1790	950	—
1850	2,173	+128.7%
1860	2,816	+29.6%
1870	2,802	−0.5%
1880	2,789	−0.5%
1890	2,999	+7.5%
1900	3,489	+16.3%
1910	3,756	+7.7%
1920	4,019	+7.0%
1930	4,159	+3.5%
1940	4,601	+10.6%
1950	4,757	+3.4%
1960	5,371	+12.9%
1970	5,863	+9.2%
1980	6,070	+3.5%
1990	6,438	+6.1%
2000	6,799	+5.6%
2010	8,013	+17.9%
2020	8,149	+1.7%
2023*	8,261	+1.4%
* = population estimate. Source: United States census records and Population Estimates Program data.

As of the census of 2000, there were 6,799 people, 2,411 households, and 1,808 families residing in the town. The population density was 212.2 inhabitants per square mile (81.9/km^{2}). There were 2,597 housing units at an average density of 81.1 per square mile (31.3/km^{2}). The racial makeup of the town was 98.15% White, 0.35% African American, 0.22% Native American, 0.28% Asian, 0.43% from other races, and 0.57% from two or more races. Hispanic or Latino of any race were 1.44% of the population. Other ethnicities: 19.2% were of French, 13.3% French Canadian, 12.8% Irish, 10.1% Italian, 9.6% English, 8.0% Polish, 5.4% Finnish and 5.4% American ancestry according to Census 2000.

There were 2,411 households, out of which 35.3% had children under the age of 18 living with them, 60.5% were married couples living together, 9.4% had a female householder with no husband present, and 25.0% were non-families. Of all households, 19.7% were made up of individuals, and 9.5% had someone living alone who was 65 years of age or older. The average household size was 2.71 and the average family size was 3.09.

In the town, the population was spread out, with 26.1% under the age of 18, 6.0% from 18 to 24, 31.1% from 25 to 44, 23.9% from 45 to 64, and 12.9% who were 65 years of age or older. The median age was 38 years. For every 100 females, there were 101.0 males. For every 100 females age 18 and over, there were 99.2 males.

The median income for a household in the town was $48,482, and the median income for a family was $52,936. Males had a median income of $38,088 versus $26,993 for females. The per capita income for the town was $21,994. About 7.4% of families and 9.1% of the population were below the poverty line, including 10.5% of those under age 18 and 13.4% of those age 65 or over.

== Education ==
Templeton is part of the Narragansett Regional School District, along with the neighboring town of Phillipston. Elementary School students from both towns attend Templeton Elementary School, middle school students attend Narragansett Regional Middle School, and high school students attend Narragansett Regional High School. The district previously also included Phillipston Memorial Elementary School, located on Phillipston Common, but that school was closed at the end of the 2019–2020 school year and all students relocated to Templeton Elementary School for the 2020–2021 academic year.

== Government ==
State government
State Representative(s):	Jonathan Zlotnik (D)
State Senator(s):	Peter Durant (R)
Governor's Councilor(s):	Paul DePalo (D)
Federal government
U.S. Representative(s):	James P. McGovern (D-2nd District),
U.S. Senators:	Elizabeth Warren (D), Ed Markey (D)

== Library ==
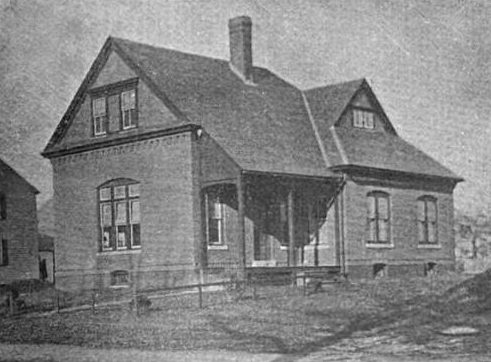
Boynton Public library (1891), named after John Boynton, manufacturer and philanthropist

Templeton's Boynton Public Library began in 1868 and named after John Boynton. In fiscal year 2008, the town of Templeton spent 0.49% ($53,608) of its budget on its public library—approximately $6 per person, per year ($7.91 adjusted for inflation to 2022).

== Notable people ==
- Stephen Pearl Andrews (1812–1886), individualist anarchist
- John Boynton, entrepreneur, philanthropist, founder of Worcester Polytechnic Institute
- George E. Bryant (1832–1907), Wisconsin legislator and general
- George A. Fuller (1851–1900), Architect, inventor" of modern skyscrapers and the modern contracting system
- William Goodell (1792–1867), missionary and linguist, the first to translate the Bible into Armeno-Turkish
- Sarah Goodridge (1788–1853), painter
- Elizabeth Goodridge (1798–1882), miniaturist, Sarah's sister
- Mike Kelley (1875–1955), baseball player
- Charles Knowlton (1800–1850), physician, atheist, and writer
- Salome Merritt (1843–1900), physician and suffragist
- Pliny Norcross (1838–1915), Wisconsin legislator and lawyer
- Sylvanus Sawyer (1822–1895), inventor and businessman
- Jonathan Baldwin Turner (1805–1899), classical scholar, botanist, dedicated Christian, and political activist
- Charlotte Frances Wilder (1839–1916), writer

== Forest ==
Otter River State Forest, operated by the Massachusetts Department of Conservation and Recreation, is located by Beamon Pond and includes 85 campsites, a swimming beach, picnic areas and a ball field.
