= Arcadia Players =

The Arcadia Players is an American chamber orchestra using historically informed performance to explore repertoire from the Renaissance, Baroque, and Classical eras. Based in Northampton, Massachusetts, the ensemble performs throughout New England.

== Background ==
Founded in 1989 by Margaret Irwin-Brandon, the Arcadia Players holds a residency at the Massachusetts Center for Renaissance Studies at UMass Amherst. The ensemble's website states they "embrace historical performance practice to illuminate and invigorate the great Western heritage of vocal and instrumental music."

In 2006, the Arcadia Players released an album with Jaap Schröder, titled Trio Sonatas. The ensemble partnered with The Shakespeare Concerts for several years, releasing three projects through Navona Records.

The Arcadia Players has collaborated with several institutions throughout New England, including the Connecticut Early Music Festival, Dartmouth College, the Hartt School, Mount Holyoke College, Smith College, and Yale University. Longtime artistic director, Ian Watson, stepped down in 2019.

To open the ensemble's 30th Anniversary Season, Margaret Irwin-Brandon (Director Emerita) performed a program at Mount Holyoke College's Abbey Chapel. Woodrow Bynum led another program with the Choir of Men and Boys from Cathedral of All Saints (Albany, New York).

The COVID-19 pandemic delayed the ensemble’s search for a new director, but Andrew Arceci served as the Artistic Director from 2022-2024. In addition to re-establishing the ensemble at the Kinney Center for Interdisciplinary Renaissance Studies (University of Massachusetts Amherst), Arceci brought the ensemble to the Bombyx Center for Arts & Equity, the Shandelee Music Festival, the Winchendon Music Festival, and other venues throughout New England. Andrus Madsen, an active performer on organ, harpsichord, and fortepiano, is the current Artistic Director.

== Discography ==
- 2006: Trio Sonatas
- 2014: Joseph Summer: Goddesses (Shakespeare Concerts Series, Vol. 3)
- 2015: Joseph Summer: Full Fathom Five - Music on Shakespeare's 'The Tempest' (Shakespeare Concert Series, Vol. 5)
- 2018: Joseph Summer: No Enemy but Winter and Rough Weather (Shakespeare Concerts Series, Vol. 6)

== Artistic Directors ==
- Founded, 1989: Margaret Irwin-Brandon
- 2004-2019: Ian Watson
- 2020-2021: Margaret Irwin-Brandon (Director Emerita), Woodrow Bynum, and other guests
- 2022-2024: Andrew Arceci
- 2025-present: Andrus Madsen
