= Sovereigns of Industry =

Seal of the National Council of the Sovereigns of Industry.

The Order of the Sovereigns of Industry, established in 1874, was an American mutualist movement targeted at urban workers which attempted to end perceived social ills through the establishment of consumer cooperatives. The organization's form and mission was directly inspired by the Order of Patrons of Husbandry (commonly known as the "National Grange"), a parallel organization established for the benefit of American farmers. After a few years a lengthy and severe financial depression of the American economy caused a net cash flow crisis in the stores associated with the organization beginning in 1878. Deep financial woes forced the dissolution of the Order in 1880.

== Organizational history ==
=== Establishment ===
The Order of the Patrons of Husbandry, commonly known as the National Grange, was established in 1868 in an effort to organize American farmers against the monopoly power being exerted by the all powerful railroads of the day. The organization initially took the form of a secret society as a means of preventing retaliation against its members. When Dudley W. Adams was elected National Master of the Grange in 1873, he called upon a friend from school, William H. Earle, to take charge of Grange organizing activities in Massachusetts.

Whereas the Patrons of Husbandry was exclusively an agricultural organization with substantial strength in the rural states of the American West, Earle found an altogether different situation in Massachusetts, a manufacturing state with only limited potential for establishment of an agrarian organization. Earle instead began to envision a new and parallel organization which attempted to unite American workers in the same manner that the Grange united farmers.

Early in January 1874 Earle called an organizational meeting in Springfield among people he had met there who seemed favorable to his idea for a new workers mutual aid organization. Fifteen people responded to Earle's convention call and they worked for a week drafting a constitution for a new organization — the Order of Sovereigns of Industry. The Order was to be governed by a National Council, headed by Earle as the group's president. A set of rituals was also adopted, with the Sovereigns of Industry choosing to copy the early Grange's structure as a secret society.

There were a total of 60 members from 8 states and the District of Columbia at the time of its foundation in 1874, including 21 women.

=== Objectives ===
According to an article published by Earle later in 1874, the Sovereigns of Industry was to be dedicated to "elevating the character, improving the condition, and, as far as possible, perfecting the happiness of the laboring classes" through the establishment of consumer cooperatives. Earle saw exploitation of the workers by wholesalers and shopkeepers and other middlemen as a primary cause of their misery:

"We propose to have Purchasing Agencies, through which consumers reach the producer direct, without so many needless 'middlemen,' who do nothing to merchandise but add to its cost. We think 'middlemen' have grown rich enough already. 'Middlemen' not only exact a tax from every consumer, but they are responsible for 'shoddy goods,' 'short weights,' and adulterations. We are determined to secure pure goods at lower prices."

Earle characterized "hand-workers" as "the real producers of wealth" and declared the Sovereigns of Industry's intention of establishing a cooperative network which would allow workers to "control the whole of what they produce, and exchange it as near as may be even with other hand-workers..." Despite this orientation, the Sovereigns of Industry decried the "waging any war of aggression upon any other class, or for fostering any antagonism of labor against capital, or of arraying the poor against the rich," but rather insisted upon its goal of "mutual assistance in self-improvement and self-protection" of its members.

=== Structure ===
The constitution of the Sovereigns of Industry called for national, state, and local councils, with the National Council to be composed of two representatives from each state.

At the organization's zenith in 1875, 101 local councils were reported as having established some form of cooperation, with 46 of these operating stores, 20 making use of the Rochdale system, and another 26 selling commodities at cost to members only. The Sovereigns of Industry made efforts to cooperate with the Patrons of Husbandry (Grange), including in at least one case the joint operation of a cooperative store.

Membership was to be open to all individuals 16 years old or older. According to the governing law of the organization, called the "Declaration of Purposes," membership was not to be constrained by race, sex, nationality, or occupation. The group was to be funded by per capita dues of 20 cents per member, with each member paying an additional 25 cents initiation fee. Additional funds were to be generated through a $15 fee charged of each organization for its charter.

=== Membership ===
The Order of the Sovereigns of Industry showed rapid growth, skewed heavily to the states of New England and the Upper Midwest. While a claim of 40,000 total members was made for the peak year of 1875 — of which three-quarters were said to have located in New England and more than 40% percent in the single state of Massachusetts — the official membership count of reporting councils was as follows:

Year	Total Membership Reported by Councils
1874	21,619
1875	27,984
1876	16,993
1877	9,673
1878	6,670

Following the state of Massachusetts, the second area of greatest penetration by the Sovereigns of Industry was in the commonwealth of Pennsylvania. Some 11,500 people were said to have joined the Sovereigns in that state, taking part in 78 local councils.

=== Official organ ===
The official organ of the Sovereigns of Industry was a publication produced in Worcester, Massachusetts called the Sovereigns of Industry Bulletin.

=== Termination ===
While the Sovereigns of Industry maintained a friendly relationship with the Granger movement, the organization's relations with the existing trade unions tended to be frosty. Many local unions of the era were organized into lodges and the rapid growth of the Sovereigns of Industry engulfed them. Moreover, some unions began to see the Order as part of the problem, trying to bid down labor costs in an effort to obtain commodities for their cooperative stores as cheaply as possible. One October 1875 attack on the Order in the National Labor Tribune charged that "the only object of the Sovereigns is to buy cheap, if they have to help reduce wages to a dollar a day to do it."

Ultimately it was the dismal economic fortunes of the country that were part and parcel of the Long Depression which spelled doom for the Sovereigns of Industry. With rampant unemployment came reductions of wages and a contraction of consumer spending. Cash payment to the Sovereigns of Industry's cooperative stores fell dramatically, causing cash flow difficulties for the local councils behind them. Moreover, many of these institutions suffered from incompetent or corrupt management. Private merchants competed effectively against the cooperatives, and bankruptcies of the latter followed.

With its cooperative business model smashed and membership levels waning, the Order of the Sovereigns of Industry went into rapid decline in 1878. The group was formally terminated in 1880.

== See also ==
- The National Grange of the Order of Patrons of Husbandry
