= Atherton D. Converse =

American politician

Atherton Darling Converse
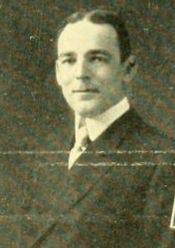

Member of the Massachusetts House of Representatives for the 2nd Worcester County District
- Incumbent
- Assumed office 1907

Personal details
- Born: January 7, 1877 Rindge, New Hampshire, United States
- Died: July 6, 1956 (aged 79)
- Occupation: Toy manufacturer, Politician

Atherton Darling Converse (January 7, 1877 – July 6, 1956) was an American businessman, toy manufacturer, and politician from Winchendon, Massachusetts. A Harvard-educated professional, he served in the Massachusetts House of Representatives after being elected to the 128th Massachusetts General Court in 1906, representing the second district of Worcester County, Massachusetts.

== Early Life and Family Origins ==
Atherton Darling Converse was born on January 7, 1877, in Rindge, New Hampshire, into a family already deeply embedded in New England’s emerging industrial economy. He was the son of Morton E. Converse (1837–1917) and Harriet Maria Atherton (1841–1886).

His father was a major figure in the American wooden toy industry, and Harriet Maria Atherton Converse. His early life was shaped by the expansion of the Converse family’s manufacturing operations in Winchendon, Massachusetts, a town that became nationally known as "Toy Town" due to the scale of its toy production industry.

His maternal lineage also connected him to manufacturing traditions, reinforcing a multi-generational association with industrial enterprise in the region.

== Education and Formation ==
Converse was educated at Harvard University, aligning him with a cohort of early 20th-century industrial leaders who combined elite academic training with ownership or management of manufacturing firms. This educational background positioned him within the upper tier of New England’s business class, where technical innovation and corporate leadership increasingly overlapped.

== Rise in the Family Manufacturing Empire ==
The Converse family business began with Morton E. Converse’s acquisition of a mill in 1873, initially producing wooden goods before transitioning into toys. Over time, the enterprise evolved through multiple partnerships:

- Mason & Converse Company (late 1870s–1883)
- Converse Toy & Woodenware Company
- Morton E. Converse & Company (from 1887 onward)

Under Morton E. Converse’s leadership, the company became one of the largest toy manufacturers in the world, producing a wide range of wooden and mechanical toys and employing hundreds to over a thousand workers at its peak.

Atherton D. Converse later assumed leadership responsibilities and became the key figure guiding the firm into the early 20th century. By the time he was active in management, the company had expanded into:

- Wooden toys (rocking horses, doll furniture, Noah’s arks)
- Mechanical and wind-up toys
- Early lithographed tin transportation toys

The firm is frequently cited as one of the dominant forces in making Winchendon synonymous with industrial toy production.

By the 1930s, he had taken full control of operations, and the company remained active until its eventual closure in 1934, reflecting broader structural changes in American manufacturing and consolidation within the toy industry.

=== Patents ===
- U.S. patent 701,155
- U.S. patent 1,182,977
- U.S. patent 877,830
- U.S. patent 1,209,675
- U.S. patent 1,207,504
- U.S. patent 1,182,978
- U.S. patent 1,039,699
- U.S. patent 1,182,979
- U.S. patent 1,039,699

== Other enterprises ==
He was a director of the Safety Fund Bank of Fitchburg, Massachusetts. During the 1930s he was president of Toy Town Tavern Inc. and Treasurer to the New England Hotel Association.

=== Political Career and Public Service ===
Converse served a single term in the 1907 Massachusetts legislature, representing Worcester County’s 2nd district.

His political role was typical of Progressive Era industrialists who briefly entered state politics, often focusing on business regulation, infrastructure, and local economic development rather than pursuing long-term legislative careers.

Although his tenure was short, he was part of a broader pattern of business elites participating in Massachusetts governance during a period of rapid industrial and social change.

=== Scientific and Experimental Interests ===
Converse also participated in early aviation-related experimentation during the 1900s, including involvement in balloon-based demonstrations associated with aerial observation and payload testing. These activities reflect the period’s experimental blending of engineering curiosity and emerging military-technological interest.

Such experiments were characteristic of Progressive Era industrial elites who often invested in or participated in technological demonstrations outside their primary industries.

In 1909 he accompanied Charles Jasper Glidden in a hot air balloon flight to demonstrate the practicability and accuracy of dropping explosives from the height of one mile, using eggs.

== Personal ==
He married Delia Minton on March 30, 1910. He married his second wife, Harriet Dorothy Taylor in 1932.

== Ancestry ==
His maternal grandfather was Thomas Atherton (1799-1869), a manufacturer of machinery who migrated to Lowell, Massachusetts in 1827 from Preston, England. His uncle Dr Abel T. Atherton was co-proprietor of the Lowell-based, Whitehead & Atherton Machine Company, as well as the Potter & Atherton Machine Company of Pawtucket, Rhode Island.
