= Tangerine, Florida =

Unincorporated area in Florida, US

- CDP
- Location in Orange County and the state of Florida
- Coordinates: 28°44′50″N 81°37′42″W
- Country: United States
- State: Florida
- County: Orange

Area
  - Total: 5.29 sq mi (13.69 km^{2})
  - Land: 4.56 sq mi (11.80 km^{2})
  - Water: 0.73 sq mi (1.89 km^{2})
- Elevation: 85 ft (26 m)

Population (2020)
  - Total: 3,237
  - Density: 710.8/sq mi (274.43/km^{2})
- Time zone: UTC-5 (Eastern (EST))
  - Summer (DST): UTC-4 (EDT)
- ZIP code: 32777
- Area code: 352
- FIPS code: 12-71100
- GNIS feature ID: 2402915

Tangerine is a census-designated place (CDP) in Orange County, Florida, United States. As of the 2020 census, Tangerine had a population of 3,237. It is part of the Orlando–Kissimmee Metropolitan Statistical Area.

== Geography ==
According to the United States Census Bureau, the CDP has a total area of 5.3 square miles (13.7 km^{2}), of which 4.6 square miles (11.8 km^{2}) is land and 0.73 square miles (1.9 km^{2}) (13.85%) is water.

== Demographics ==
Historical population
Census	Pop.	Note	%±
2020	3,237		—
U.S. Decennial Census

=== 2020 census ===
As of the 2020 census, Tangerine had a population of 3,237. The median age was 44.4 years. 21.6% of residents were under the age of 18 and 20.6% of residents were 65 years of age or older. For every 100 females there were 101.4 males, and for every 100 females age 18 and over there were 100.3 males age 18 and over.

83.6% of residents lived in urban areas, while 16.4% lived in rural areas.

There were 1,196 households in Tangerine, of which 30.2% had children under the age of 18 living in them. Of all households, 56.9% were married-couple households, 17.7% were households with a male householder and no spouse or partner present, and 19.6% were households with a female householder and no spouse or partner present. About 19.4% of all households were made up of individuals and 9.9% had someone living alone who was 65 years of age or older.

There were 1,339 housing units, of which 10.7% were vacant. The homeowner vacancy rate was 4.5% and the rental vacancy rate was 9.5%.

Racial composition as of the 2020 census
Race	Number	Percent
White	1,869	57.7%
Black or African American	646	20.0%
American Indian and Alaska Native	36	1.1%
Asian	60	1.9%
Native Hawaiian and Other Pacific Islander	1	0.0%
Some other race	233	7.2%
Two or more races	392	12.1%
Hispanic or Latino (of any race)	773	23.9%

=== 2000 census ===
As of the 2000 census, there were 826 people, 323 households, and 256 families residing in the CDP. The population density was 715.9 inhabitants per square mile (276.4/km^{2}). There were 348 housing units at an average density of 301.6 per square mile (116.4/km^{2}). The racial makeup of the CDP was 91.65% White, 3.27% African American, 0.24% Native American, 1.57% Asian, 2.42% from other races, and 0.85% from two or more races. Hispanic or Latino of any race were 7.99% of the population.

There were 323 households, out of which 31.6% had children under the age of 18 living with them, 67.2% were married couples living together, 8.4% had a female householder with no husband present, and 20.7% were non-families. 16.1% of all the households were made up of individuals, and 5.3% had someone living alone who was 65 years of age or older. The average household size was 2.56 and the average family size was 2.85.

In the CDP the population was spread out, with 23.2% under the age of 18, 4.7% from 18 to 24, 27.6% from 25 to 44, 29.8% from 45 to 64, and 14.6% who were 65 years of age or older. The median age was 42 years. For every 100 females, there were 96.7 males. For every 100 females age 18 and over, there were 91.5 males.

The median income for a household in the CDP was $42,264, and the median income for a family was $49,667. Males had a median income of $40,585 versus $22,045 for females. The per capita income for the CDP was $21,670. About 2.8% of families and 2.7% of the population were below the poverty line, including 3.4% of those under age 18 and none of those age 65 or over.

== History ==
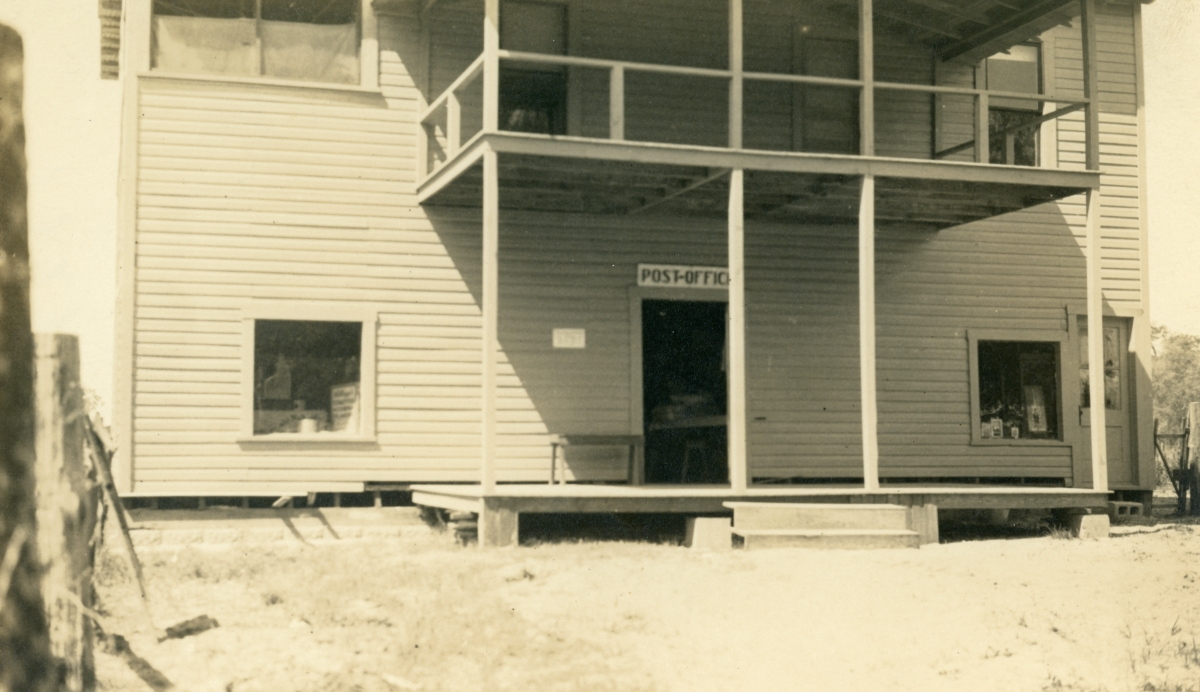
Tangerine, Florida post office in 1921

=== Timeline ===
==== Mid 1870s ====
Dudley W. Adams arrives at what is known as the "Olaville" settlement in Northwest Orange County, Florida.

==== 1879 ====
During a neighborhood meeting at the home of Miss Bessie Heustis, sister-in-law of Mr. Adams, the name of Olaville is changed to Tangerine, the group being inspired by the fruit of the tree that grew by her doorstep.

==== 1886-1887 ====
The Congregational Church is founded as the Union Church of Christ in Tangerine. Shortly thereafter, the name is changed to the Congregational Church of Christ and a church building is constructed. In the 1940s, the church is named Tangerine Community Church.

==== April 3, 1909 ====
The Tangerine Improvement Society (TIS) is founded by local Tangerine women. Men are later admitted in 1920.

==== 1911 ====
Mr. and Mrs. William H. and Addie G. Earl donate land to TIS for a community building – “Tangerine Community Hall.”

==== April 5, 1912 ====
The Tangerine Community Hall opens its doors to community use.

==== 1920s ====
Mrs. Sadie Trimble gifts Trimble Park, situated between Lakes Beauclaire and Carlton, to Orange County.

==== 1937 ====
Land later to become Tangerine Park is conveyed to the Tangerine Improvement Society.

==== May 28, 1972 ====
The Tangerine Community Hall catches fire. The nearby Zellwood, Florida fire department responds within seven minutes, but the building is destroyed.

==== April 18, 1977 ====
A new TIS building at 7101 Wright Ave. is dedicated as Johnston Hall in honor of Cecil “CeCe” Johnston for his dedication and service to Tangerine. When the original TIS building burned in 1972, Mr. Johnston led the drive for funds to erect the new building.

== Notable residents ==
Tangerine was the adopted home of novelist, journalist and government consultant Harry Hart Frank (born Chicago, Illinois, 1908; died Jacksonville, Florida, 1964). Under the pen name Pat Frank, his classic 1959 post-apocalyptic novel Alas, Babylon is set in the fictional Central Florida small town (stated pop. 3,500) of "Fort Repose". Fort Repose, although fictional, is a clearly drawn composite, representative of many small isolated native-settler Florida communities of the period. The actual town of Mount Dora, 4 miles (6 km) north of Tangerine, has been stated as a specific inspiration for Fort Repose, with Frank's fictional shantytown "Pistolville" said to have been named for Mt. Dora's area of the same name.
