= North American Family Campers Association =

The North American Family Campers Association (NAFCA) is a non-profit family camping association. NAFCA is built on a structure of volunteers who hold offices to create a form of government. NAFCA is an international organization that has members throughout the United States and Canada. The 'full board' consists of President, Vice President, Second Vice President, Secretary, Treasurer, State Directors and Past President. Each State has a 'state director', 'secretary', 'treasurer', and 'deputies'. Chapters can range in size and are organized by their officers 'president', 'vice president', 'secretary', 'treasurer', and delegates. NAFCA was formed in 1957 at Otter River State Forest in Baldwinville, MA. Once called NECA (New England Camping Association), in 1967 as the North American Family Campers Association was renamed.

To compete with Good Sam and FMCA, NAFCA in the late 1960s and early 1970s started to form chapters across the country. In the late 1970s and early 1980s, many of the chapters that were not in New England began to disband because of lack of travel and the financial problems of NAFCA.

Since then, chapters have expanded once again and chapters can now be found outside of the New England area. Now in existence there are chapters formed in Florida in the 90's for those who won't miss the snowy winters in New England and travel Florida, called Palm Tree, Chapter 27; and in areas of Canada. As of 2011, a new chapter was formed in Florida to serve the Orlando, Kissimmee and Central Florida area called Orlando 183.

The first chapter to join NAFCA was in Springfield, VT. The newest chapter was formed on February 19, 2011, and it is based in Orlando, FL.

Due to the nature of the organization, non-profit, it has to be self-sufficient. NAFCA supports itself with funds generated by membership, fundraisers, selling of logo-inscribed merchandise and others. NAFCA advertises by participating in camping shows to generate interest and memberships. Camping is a great family tradition filled with activity; long-lasting memories and generations of fun can be had.

One of NAFCA's chapters runs a camping show. Pioneer Valley Chapter 8, also known as PV8, based out of Springfield, MA is the largest NAFCA chapter, based on membership, and it is also the promoter of the annual Springfield RV Camping & Outdoor Show at the Eastern States Exposition in West Springfield, MA.

NAFCA traditionally has campouts during the year, in which all of NAFCA's members are encouraged to attend and reconnect. They are the conservation weekends at Otter River State Forest (held twice annually in April and October, birthplace of NAFCA), the NAFCA Spring Safari (which is held in May), and a week-long campout called the NAFCAree (usually in July)

States of NAFCA hold their own gatherings as well which invite the NAFCA public to attend and support each others. Each state holds its own fundraiser, which is called a Fall Frolic. At this event chapters can purchase a low-cost booth in which to sell something to the membership for a chapter fundraiser. Chapters also plan their own events and campouts during the year.

Everything in NAFCA is based on camping and family fun. Members range in age, race, sex, size, hometown and more creating a welcoming group of friendly campers. NAFCA has games to play and competitions that take place annually, everyone is able and encouraged to attend. Great fun can be had by all.

NAFCA has something called the "7 C's" - the seven c's are general rules to live by which are the base of all campers should live by: Care, Caution, Courteousy, Conversation, Cleanliness, Cooperation and Common Sense. These c's can be applied to everyday life and are the backbone of good natured people.

NAFCA has a magazine which each member receives with their membership called Campfire Chatter. The Campfire Chatter has articles submitted by committees, and members to tell each other of what's going on in NAFCA and what events are being planned. Reservation forms are handy to plan your camping adventures for the season (May - October). There are recipes, a calendar of events and a message from the president. Features also include a listing of members who are sick, celebrating birthdays and anniversaries, birth announcements and the like called NAFCA Cares. Features are created to continue communication lines between members who may not see each other often.
