= Charlotte Frances Wilder =

American writer

- Born: Charlotte Frances Felt; December 12, 1839; Templeton, Massachusetts, U.S.
- Died: December 3, 1916 (aged 76); Manhattan, Kansas, U.S.
- Resting place: Sunset Cemetery, Manhattan, Kansas
- Occupation: Writer
- Spouse: George Carter Wilder (m. 1861)
- Writing career
- Language: English
- Subject: Methodism

Charlotte Frances Wilder (December 12, 1839 - December 3, 1916) was an American writer. She was one of the most widely known writers of Kansas, and the author of many religious books, including for juvenile audiences, and a contributor to church papers and magazines. Her works -included in the Bibliothèque nationale de France, Paris- were "entitled to go down to posterity, her life-work preserved as information for future generations".

In 1867, Wilder and her husband set up their home in Manhattan, Kansas -Kansas being the new anti-slavery state- and Manhattan came to be known as "Mrs. Wilder's Home". Here, for half a century, she was a factor in church and state; in every civic reform, she was a leader. She was a member and officer of many clubs and societies, local, state and interstate; missionary, civic, philanthropic and literary. At her death, she was vice-president of the State Federation of Clubs. Her contributions to the Methodist press included the Central Christian Advocate, Epworth Herald, Zion's Herald, and the Methodist Review. She was the author of "The Land of the Rising Sun" (1877) and "Sister Ridenour's Sacrifice" (1883).

== Early years ==
Charlotte Frances Pfelt (or Felt) was born December 12, 1839, in Templeton, Massachusetts. She was the daughter of Col. Elijah and Hannah Lawrence Pfelt. She graduated from high school in Massachusetts.

== Career ==
In 1861, she married George Carter Wilder (1837-1918), a lawyer of Clinton, New York. In 1867, they moved to Lawrence, Kansas, and in 1868, changed their residence to Manhattan, Kansas, where they formed part of the social life of the town.

For several years, she taught private classes in English literature. At frequent intervals, she contributed booklets, leaflets and articles for magazines. At the General Executive Committee Meeting of 1910, she was elected to the literature committee, then in charge of miscellaneous literature for the Woman's Foreign Missionary Society of the Methodist Episcopal Church. In her home, in 1888, the young woman's missionary society was organized, and here, 20 years later, the Standard Bearer organization was formed.

She was one of the widely known writers of the state, the author of many religious books, Land of the Rising Sun, 1877; Sister Ridenour’s Sacrifice, 1883; Polly Button’s New Year (“Worth While” series), 1892; Entertainments (with Elizabeth Champney), 1879; Christmas Cheer in All Lands, 1905; Mission Ships, 1904; Easter Gladness, 1906; The Child’s Own Book, 1910; and The Wonderful Story of Jesus, 1911. She was a contributor to many church papers and magazines, including Youth’s Companion, Philadelphia Press, Christian Union (Outlook), New York Independent, and Methodist Review. She provided editorial services to the Central Christian Advocate.

Polly Button's New Year (1892) is a character sketch presenting the history of a plain, rather ignorant woman who grows out of her nominal Christianity into one of greater spiritual depth and greater practical usefulness. She becomes one of those reliable people making up the rank and file upon which the world's salvation depends. Polly Button is a humble member of the church, but it suddenly occurs to her that she as well as the minister have a duty in the world to perform. She begins a new year with a sense of her responsibility and with a sincere desire to change her life. Thus, in her little way, she becomes a genuine power in the community, an example to those about her in wealth and position, and a help to the young with whom she comes into contact. Her quaint soliloquies and comments were considered piquant and bright. The book's binding was described as one of the most unique of the season.

== Personal life ==
She married George Carter Wilder in 1861. Their children included George Francis (died 1870); Adelaide Frances (Mrs. Sawdon), (b. 1877): Josephine Hannah (b. 1879).

Wilder served as president of Dorcas Society; was active in the Topeka Branch of the Woman's Foreign Missionary Society, and was its president 1895–1902. She was a member of the Woman's Kansas Day Society, Domestic Science Club of Manhattan, Kan. (president 1907–08); National Household Economic Association (vice-president for Kansas 1892–1902); served seven terms as secretary of the Social Science Club of Kansas and Missouri; served as vice-president and chairman of the Literature Committee of the Kansas State Federation of Women's Clubs. Wilder belonged to the Methodist Church (many years teacher of large Bible class). She was a member of the Authors' League, Kansas; Woman's Press Association, and the Kansas State Historical Society. She was a member of the Polly Ogden chapter of the Daughters of the American Revolution, being the granddaughter of Samuel Pfelt, a minuteman.

Wilder died on December 3, 1916, at her home in Manhattan, and was buried at that city's Sunset Cemetery. She was survived by her husband and two daughters, Josephine McCullough, of Delevan, and Adelaide Sawdon, of Ithaca.

== Selected works ==
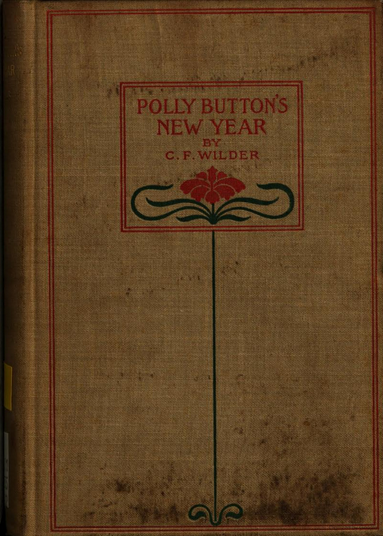
Polly Button's New Year

- Sister Ridnour's sacrifice : with other sketches, 1883
- Polly Button's New Year, 1892
- The wonderful story of Jesus, 1911
