= Lake Monomonac =

Artificial lake in New Hampshire and Massachusetts

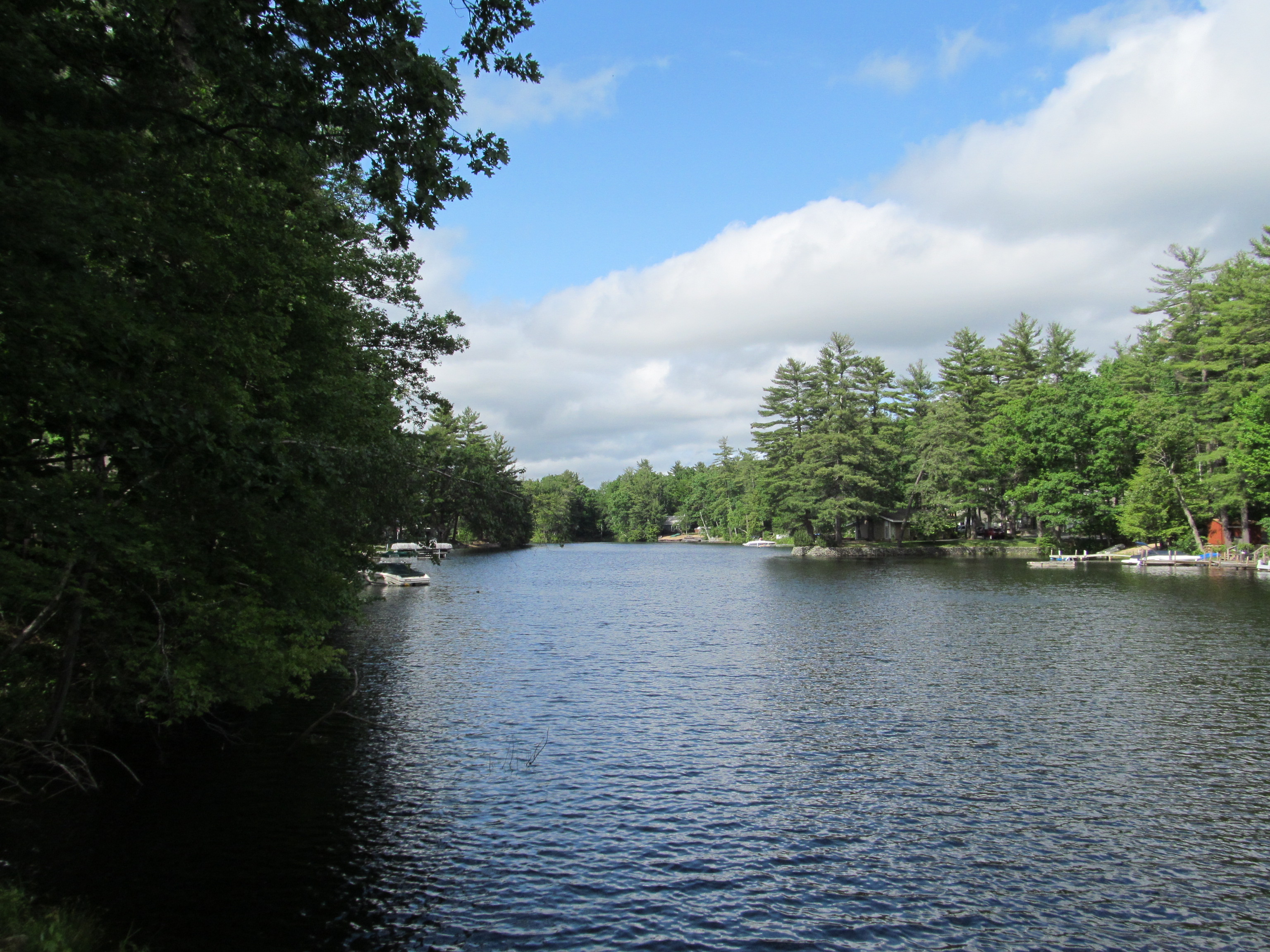
- South end of Lake Monomonac

- Location within Massachusetts Location within New Hampshire Location within the United States
- Location: Cheshire County, New Hampshire; Worcester County, Massachusetts
- Coordinates: 42°43′3″N 71°59′43″W
- Primary inflows: North Branch Millers River
- Primary outflows: North Branch Millers River
- Basin countries: United States
- Max. length: 2.7 mi (4.3 km)
- Max. width: 0.7 mi (1.1 km)
- Surface area: 594 acres (2.4 km^{2})
- Average depth: 10 ft (3.0 m)
- Max. depth: 22 ft (6.7 m)
- Surface elevation: 1,045 feet (318.5 m)
- Islands: Blueberry Island; Paradise Island
- Settlements: Rindge, NH; Winchendon, MA

Lake Monomonac is a reservoir in Rindge, New Hampshire, and Winchendon, Massachusetts, in the United States. It was created from a small pond in New Hampshire by the construction of dams on the North Branch of the Millers River, a part of the Connecticut River watershed.

Lake Monomonac is 594 acres (240 ha) in size, with 411 acres (166 ha) in New Hampshire and the remaining 183 acres (74 ha) in Massachusetts. The lake has a maximum recorded depth of 22 feet (6.7 m) and an average depth of 10 feet (3.0 m).

The lake is classified as a warmwater fishery, with observed species including smallmouth and largemouth bass, black crappie, chain pickerel, white perch, pumpkinseed, bluegill, horned pout, and green sunfish.

== See also ==
- List of lakes in Massachusetts
- List of lakes in New Hampshire
