= Winchendon Music Festival =

- Genre: Classical, folk, jazz, historical performance, and world music
- Locations: Winchendon, Massachusetts, United States
- Years active: Since 2016
- Founders: Andrew Arceci

The Winchendon Music Festival (WMF) is a non-profit organization and concert series held in Winchendon, Massachusetts. The festival showcases performances by international artists from a variety of genres including (but not limited to) classical, folk, jazz, historical performance, and world music. Concerts are free to the public, with support from several individuals, businesses, and foundations.

== Background ==
The Winchendon Music Festival was founded in 2016 by multi-instrumentalist Andrew Arceci and dedicated to the memory of his late father, Robert J. Arceci (1950–2015). Robert Arceci was a pediatric oncologist from Winchendon with a passion for the arts.

The Winchendon Music Festival presents solo, small ensemble, and chamber orchestral programs. Noted artists have included Aldo Abreu, Anne Azéma, Arcadia Players, Asako Takeuchi, Colin Davin, Emily Marvosh, Floyds Row, John Arcaro, Joshua Rifkin, Krista River, Mehmet Ali Sanlıkol, Randall Scotting, Teresa Wakim, and others.

Festival founder and director Andrew Arceci leads several of the festival's musical programs each year, performing on viola da gamba, violone, and bass.

Performances for the Winchendon Music Festival take place at several venues around Winchendon, including the American Legion Post 193, Beals Memorial Library, Immaculate Heart of Mary Church, Murdock-Whitney House (Winchendon History & Cultural Center), Old Centre Church (Old Centre Historic District), and the Robinson Broadhurst Amphitheater. Bill Staines, Franziska Huhn, Jaap ter Linden, and other artists were scheduled to perform in 2020, but the festival was canceled due to the COVID-19 pandemic. WMF had limited operations during 2020 and 2021, but the festival returned with live performances in 2022.
