= John Boynton (Worcester Polytechnic Institute) =

American businessman and politician (c.1791–1868)

John Boynton (left) and Ichabod Washburn (right).

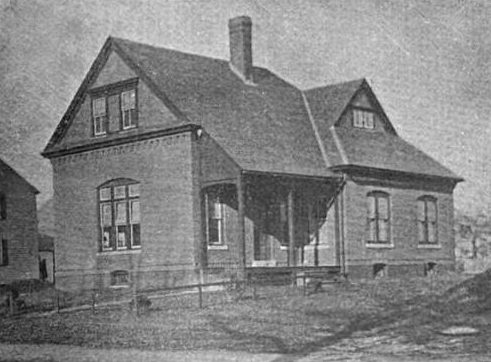
Boynton Public library in Templeton, Massachusetts in 1891

John Boynton (c. 1791–1868) was an American tinware entrepreneur, politician, and philanthropist who founded Worcester Polytechnic Institute in Worcester, Massachusetts.

John Boynton was born in about 1791 to Elizabeth and Jeremiah Boynton, farmers in Mason, New Hampshire. Boynton served in the New Hampshire militia in 1814. Boynton learned the tinware trade in New Ipswich, New Hampshire and then founded a tinware business in New Hampshire before moving to Templeton, Massachusetts. Eventually, peddlers with carts sold his tinware housewares throughout New England. In 1839 Boynton was elected to the Massachusetts House of Representatives. Although he married twice, he had no children and wished to found a school of science where students could help facilitate many of New England's new industries. With Ichabod Washburn's input, they decided to form a school which combined practical experience and academics. Boynton donated $100,000 anonymously and died before the first school buildings were completed.

Boynton is memorialized in Boynton Hall (1867), Boynton Street (on faculty row), The Peddler (the class book at WPI), Boynton Library in Templeton, and Boynton Middle School in Mason, New Hampshire.
