= Winchendon, Massachusetts =

- Town
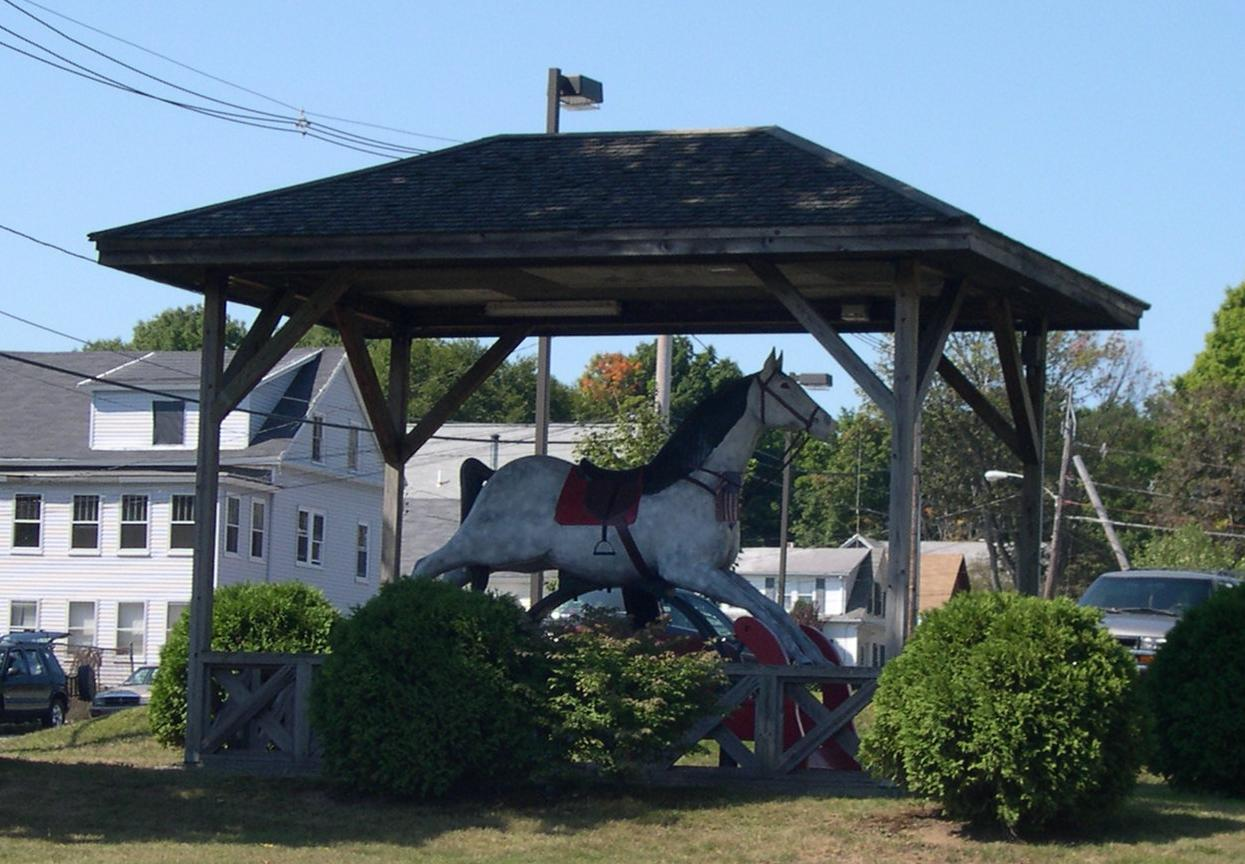
- Clyde II

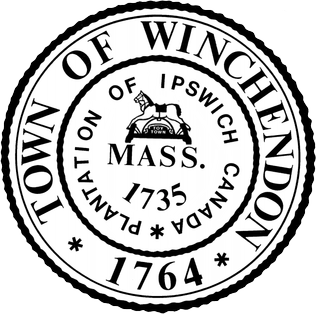
- Seal
- Nickname: Toy Town
- Location in Worcester County and the state of Massachusetts.
- Coordinates: 42°41′10″N 72°02′40″W
- Country: United States
- State: Massachusetts
- County: Worcester
- Settled: 1753
- Incorporated: 1764

Government
  - Type: Open town meeting
  - Town Manager: William McKinney
  - Board of Selectmen: Audrey LaBrie; Rick Ward, Chair; Erika Eitland; Andrew Beauvais, Vice Chair; Melissa Blanchard

Area
  - Total: 44.1 sq mi (114.1 km^{2})
  - Land: 43.3 sq mi (112.1 km^{2})
  - Water: 0.77 sq mi (2.0 km^{2})
- Elevation: 1,001 ft (305 m)

Population (2020)
  - Total: 10,364
  - Density: 239.5/sq mi (92.45/km^{2})
- Time zone: UTC−5 (Eastern)
  - Summer (DST): UTC−4 (Eastern)
- ZIP Code: 01475
- Area code: 351/978
- FIPS code: 25-80405
- GNIS feature ID: 0618394
- Website: www.townofwinchendon.com

Winchendon (/ˈwɪn.tʃəndən/ WIN-chin-din), nicknamed Toy Town, is a town in Worcester County, Massachusetts, United States. The population was 10,364 at the 2020 census. The town includes the villages of Waterville and Winchendon Springs (also known as Spring Village). A census-designated place, also named Winchendon, is defined within the town for statistical purposes. The Winchendon State Forest, a 174.5 acres (70.62 hectares) parcel, is located within the town as is Otter River State Forest; both recreational areas are managed by the Massachusetts Department of Conservation and Recreation.

== History ==
Winchendon is a small town in north-central Massachusetts, originally the country of the Pennacook Indians, and then the Nipnet/Nipmuck tribe.

The House of Representatives made the grant of New Ipswich Canada, now Winchendon, on June 10, 1735, in answer to a petition from Lt. Abraham Tilton of Ipswich. The petition was on behalf of veterans or surviving heirs participating in the 1690 expeditions against Canada. Winchendon was officially incorporated in 1764, named after Nether Winchendon, Buckinghamshire, England, which itself was the site of land owned by Governor Francis Bernard, who signed the town's incorporation into law. (The English village would be where the Governor would die, fifteen years later.) The Millers River provided water power for mills, and at one time Winchendon produced so many wooden shingles that it was nicknamed Shingletown.

Morton E. Converse started his business career in Converseville, New Hampshire, manufacturing acids. In 1873, he purchased a nearby mill to make wooden products. Apparently he started making toys there, but soon teamed with Orland Mason of Winchendon to form the Mason & Converse Company, which lasted until 1883. Converse then partnered with his uncle, Alfred C. Converse, and Converse Toy & Woodenware Company was formed. In 1887, the company changed its name to Morton E. Converse & Company. It remained in business until 1934 having been under the stewardship of Atherton D. Converse.

Converse made a great variety of toys, including Noah's Arks, doll furniture, kiddie riding racers, hobby horses, floor whirligigs, drums, wagon blocks, building blocks, pianos, trunks, ten pins, farm houses, and musical roller chimes. Such a large number of toys were made in Winchendon that it became known as Toy Town.

The original Giant Rocking Horse was built in 1912 by Morton Converse. The 12-foot (3.7 m) grey hobby horse was named Clyde, and made from nine pine trees. It was a copy of the company's #12 rocking horse. In 1914, Clyde entered the local parade to celebrate the town's 150th anniversary. Clyde was moved to the railroad station for about 20 years. Then in 1934, he moved to the edge of the Toy Town Tavern for about 30 years. After that, he was put in storage and fell into disrepair. A replica, Clyde II, was sculpted in 1988 by Winchendon native Sherman LaBarge, using the original as a model. He is now on display in a covered pavilion.

=== Spring Village ===
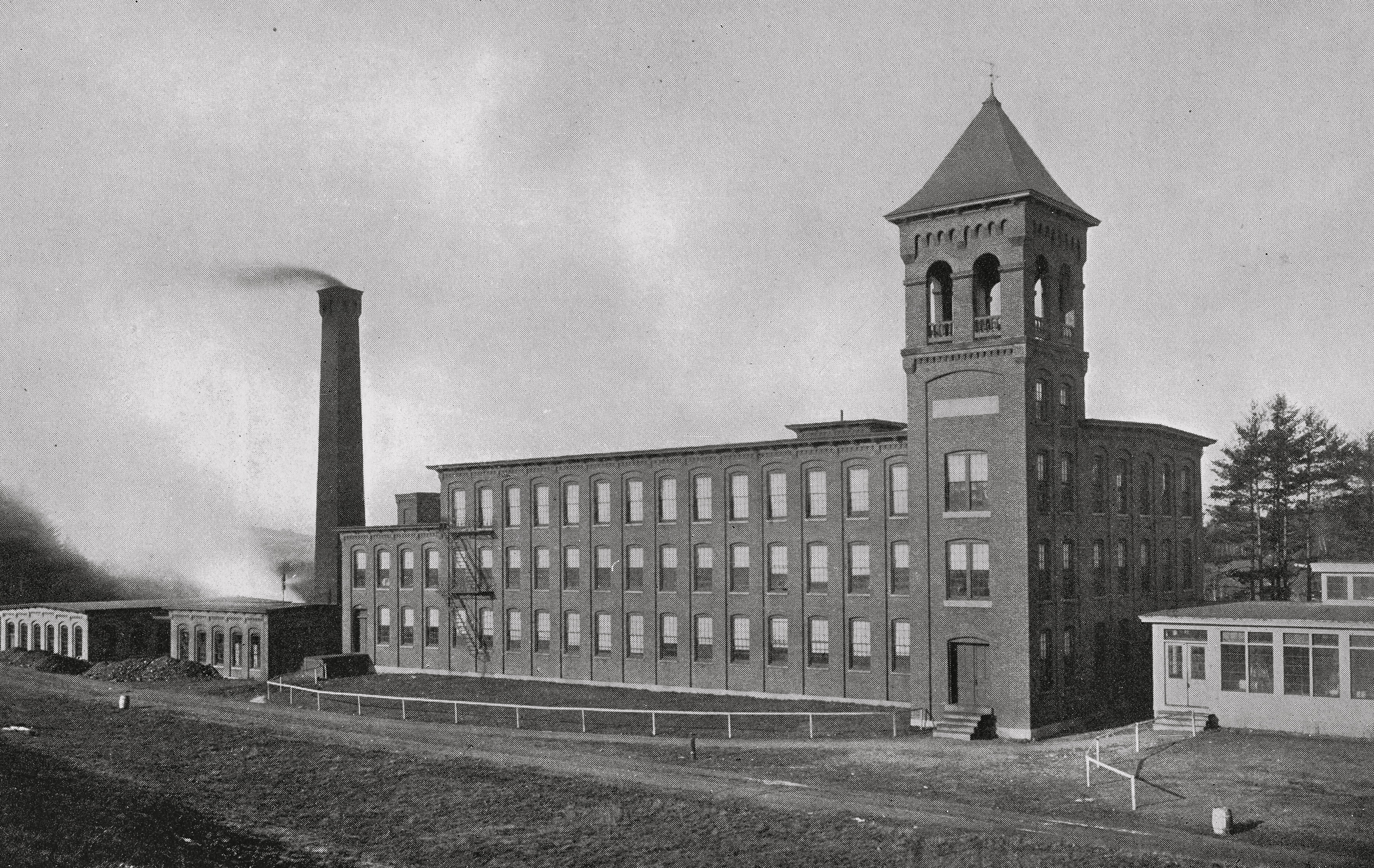
A second mill in Winchendon Springs on Glenallan Street was operational from 1886 until closing in 1929, during the economic decline of the Great Depression

In addition to the manufacturing of wood products, Winchendon is known for its textile business during the Industrial Revolution. Located at the headwaters of the Millers River, Joseph 'Deacon' White of West Boylston, Massachusetts, with his son Nelson, purchased a textile mill in Spring Village in 1843. By 1857, the Nelson Mills had revamped a previous facility. In 1870, Joseph N. White, son of Nelson, traveled to Canada to recruit additional workers from Quebec. Spring Village became a prototype 'company town' with jobs, housing and a school for its workers. A second mill was built in 1887 and was known as the Glenallan Mill. The business thrived during the last half of the 19th and first half of the 20th centuries. As the south was modernized during the 1930s, textile operations in New England migrated south. Both World War II and the Korean War demands for denim were instrumental in keeping White Brothers, Inc. in business; the organization ceased operations in 1956 due to economic pressures from industrialization of the south.

== Geography ==
According to the United States Census Bureau, the town has a total area of 44.1 square miles (114 km^{2}), of which 43.3 square miles (112 km^{2}) is land and 0.8 square miles (2.1 km^{2}), or 1.77%, is water. Winchendon is drained by the Millers River. Winchendon is home to the Lake Dennison Recreation Area and Whitney Pond, and shares Lake Monomonac with Rindge, New Hampshire to the north. Along the path of the Millers River, in the western part of town, much of the land is marshy, with several brooks feeding into both the Millers River and the nearby Otter River, which flows into the Millers River in the southwest corner of town. The town lies on relatively flat high ground, with the western slope of Town Line Hill (1,320 ft) being the highest point in town, near the southeast corner of town. Two protected areas, the Birch Hill Wildlife Management Area and the Otter River State Forest, both have part of their lands within the town, as well as the small Winchendon State Forest.

Winchendon is the middle town of the three Worcester County towns bordering New Hampshire's Cheshire County. It is bounded by Fitzwilliam and Rindge to the north, Ashburnham to the east, Gardner to the southeast, Templeton to the southwest, and Royalston to the west. From its town center, Winchendon is 16 miles (26 km) northwest of Fitchburg, 20 miles (32 km) southeast of Keene, New Hampshire, 35 miles (56 km) north-northwest of Worcester and 60 miles (97 km) northwest of Boston.

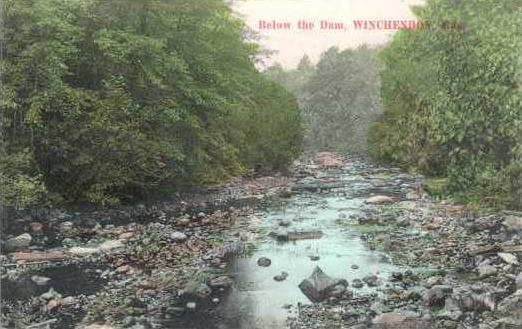
Below the Dam, 1909

== Transportation ==
Winchendon has no interstate or limited access highways within town; the nearest is Route 2, the major east–west route through the northern part of the state, in Templeton and Gardner. U.S. Route 202 passes through the town before heading into New Hampshire. Route 12 also passes through the town, from Ashburnham towards Fitzwilliam and Keene. The northern terminus of Route 140 is also within town, at its intersection with Route 12. This intersection was improved around the turn of the 21st century to include stoplights, in order to make it safer (as it had been a common site for accidents within town). When Route 140 was rerouted to bypass the Town of Gardner in the 1970s, Winchendon's status as a bedroom community was facilitated by easy access to Route 2 and points east toward Greater Boston, I-495 and I-95.

The Boston & Albany Railroad had an important junction in town; the former station was location on Central and Railroad Streets. Freight service ended in the 1980s when successor Guilford Rail System abandoned the line, which followed Route 12 for much of its route.

A line of the Montachusett Regional Transit Authority (MART) links the town with Gardner (and, in the mornings, directly with Fitchburg). There is no air service within town; the nearest small airport is Gardner Municipal Airport in Templeton, and the nearest national air service is located at Manchester-Boston Regional Airport in New Hampshire.

== Demographics ==
Historical population
Year	Pop.	±%
1790	946	—
1850	2,445	+158.5%
1860	2,624	+7.3%
1870	3,398	+29.5%
1880	3,722	+9.5%
1890	4,390	+17.9%
1900	5,001	+13.9%
1910	5,678	+13.5%
1920	5,904	+4.0%
1930	6,202	+5.0%
1940	6,575	+6.0%
1950	6,585	+0.2%
1960	6,237	−5.3%
1970	6,635	+6.4%
1980	7,019	+5.8%
1990	8,805	+25.4%
2000	9,611	+9.2%
2010	10,300	+7.2%
2020	10,364	+0.6%
2022*	10,385	+0.2%
* = population estimate. Source: United States census records and Population Estimates Program data.

As of the census of 2000, there were 9,611 people, 3,447 households, and 2,478 families residing in the town. The population density was 222.0 inhabitants per square mile (85.7/km^{2}). There were 3,660 housing units at an average density of 84.6 per square mile (32.7/km^{2}). The racial makeup of the town was 95.96% White, 0.80% Black or African American, 0.30% Native American, 0.62% Asian, 0.07% Pacific Islander, 0.95% from other races, and 1.29% from two or more races. Hispanic or Latino of any race were 2.03% of the population.

There were 3,447 households, out of which 39.4% had children under the age of 18 living with them, 56.3% were married couples living together, 11.2% had a female householder with no husband present, and 28.1% were non-families. 22.3% of all households were made up of individuals, and 9.8% had someone living alone who was 65 years of age or older. The average household size was 2.75 and the average family size was 3.23.

In the town, the population was spread out, with 30.2% under the age of 18, 6.6% from 18 to 24, 32.0% from 25 to 44, 20.7% from 45 to 64, and 10.5% who were 65 years of age or older. The median age was 35 years. For every 100 females, there were 98.4 males. For every 100 females age 18 and over, there were 94.9 males.

The median income for a household in the town was $43,750, and the median income for a family was $50,086. Males had a median income of $36,875 versus $29,099 for females. The per capita income for the town was $18,798. About 6.8% of families and 10.0% of the population were below the poverty line, including 10.6% of those under age 18 and 19.3% of those age 65 or over. The local senior high is Murdock High School.

== Library ==
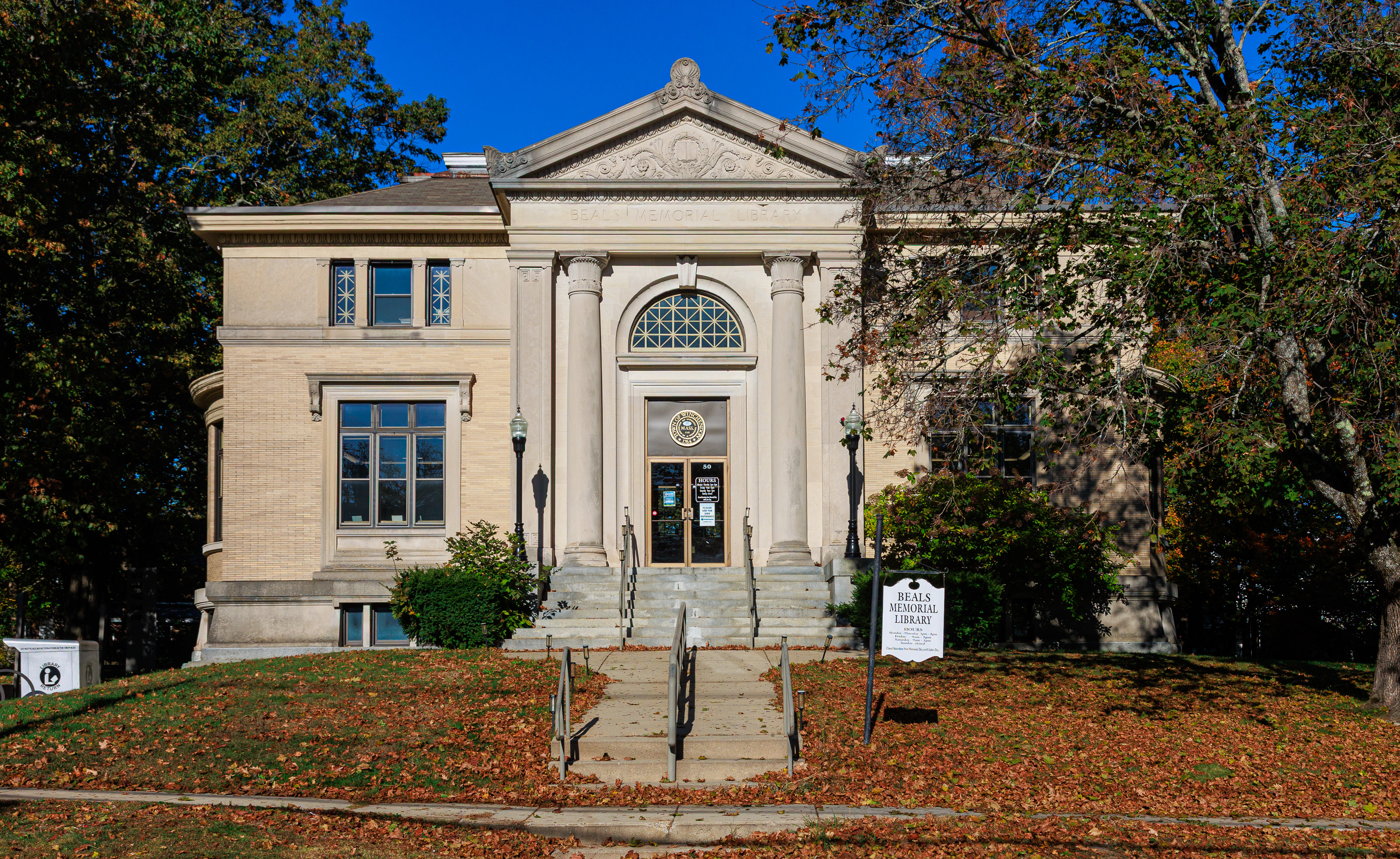
Beals Memorial Library

The Winchendon public library began in 1867. In 1907, the library trustees approached philanthropist Andrew Carnegie to fund a new facility; when Carnegie declined to increase his funding from $12,500 to $25,000, Charles L. Beals, a local businessman, presented the Selectman of Winchendon a check for $25,000 to fund a new library. In fiscal year 2008, the town of Winchendon spent 0.62% ($149,399) of its budget on its public library—approximately $14 per person, per year ($18.69 adjusted for inflation to 2022).

== Water ==
The Ashburnham & Winchendon Joint Water Authority provides municipal water. The water source is the spring-fed Upper Naukeag Lake in Ashburnham.

== Education ==
Winchendon Public Schools:

- Memorial Elementary School (K–2)
- Toy Town Elementary School (3–5)
- Murdock Middle/High School (6–12)

== Commerce ==
The town's largest employer is Saloom Furniture Company, a dining furniture manufacturer that has two factories with 100,000 square feet (9,300 m^{2}) of space.

== Points of interest ==
- Murdock-Whitney House Museum
- Otter River State Forest covers a portion of the southwestern portion of Winchendon
- Lake Dennison State Recreation Area
- Winchendon Music Festival

== Notable people ==
- Dudley W. Adams, horticulturalist and granger
- Atherton D. Converse, politician and toy manufacturer
- Eliza Crosby Allen, journal editor
- Ella Elvira Gibson, first woman to serve as a military chaplain in the United States military
- Levi P. Morton, U.S. vice president from 1889 to 1893 under Benjamin Harrison
- Earle E. Partridge, U.S. Air Force four-star general
- William Barrett Washburn, Massachusetts governor from 1872 to 1874
- Lawton Walter "Whitey" Witt, Major League Baseball player from 1916 to 1926

== See also ==
- List of mill towns in Massachusetts

== Gallery ==
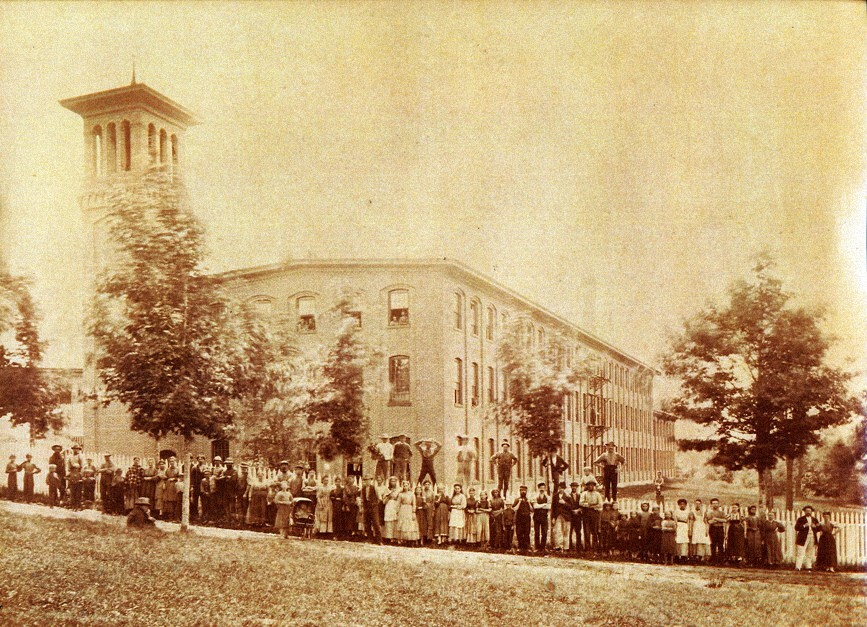
Spring Village's Nelson Mill, c. 1860s

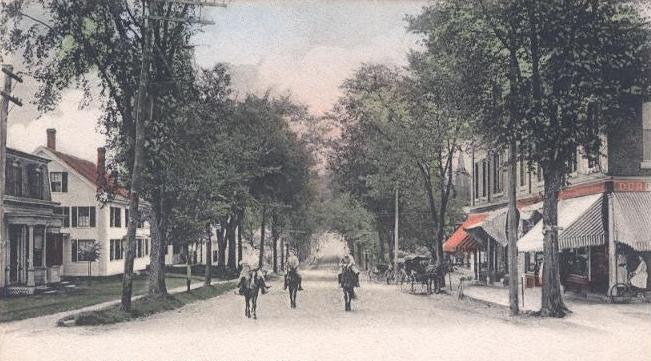
Central Street, 1905

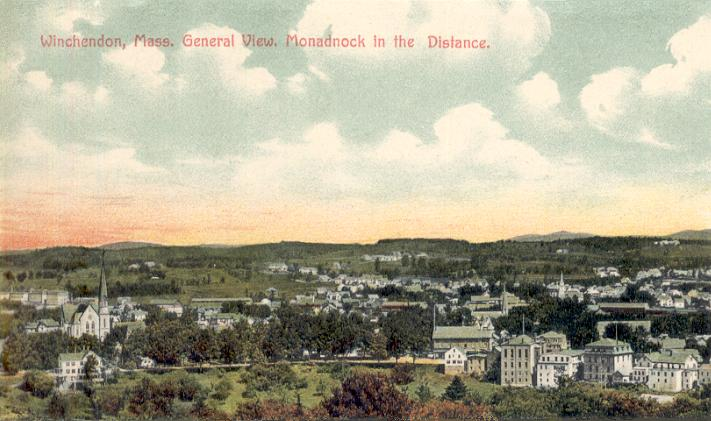
General View, 1906

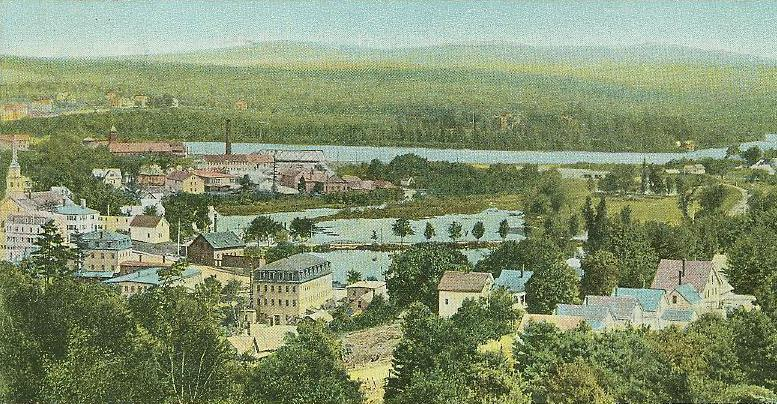
Bird's-eye View, c. 1906

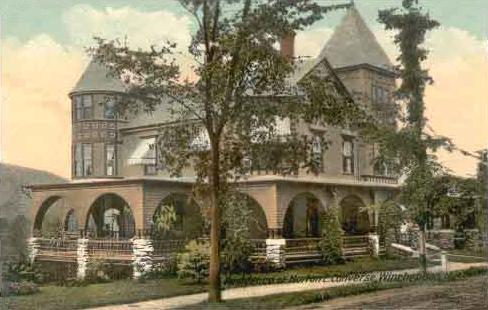
Converse House, c. 1908

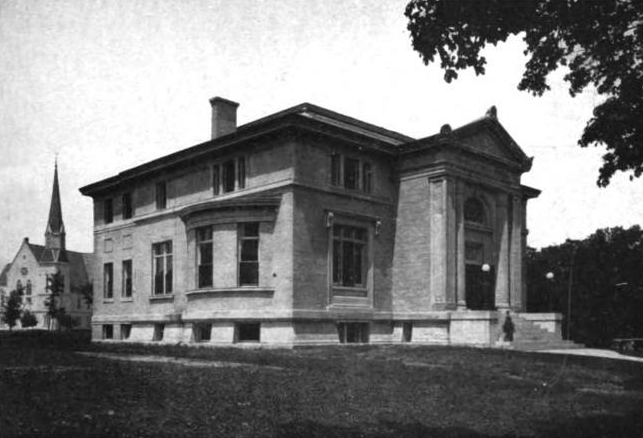
Beals Memorial Library, 1915
