= Baldwinville, Massachusetts =

- CDP
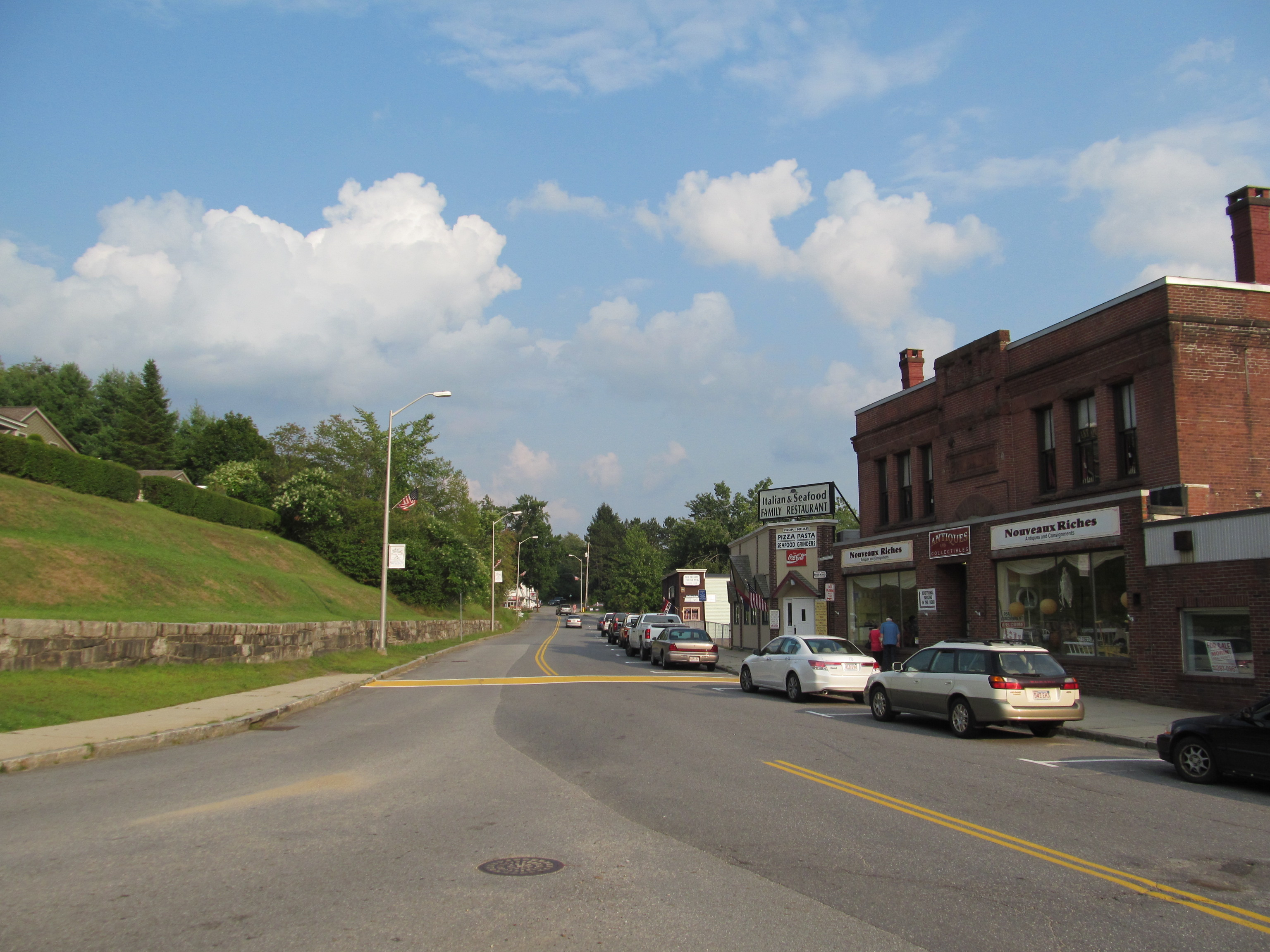
- Central Street, Downtown Baldwinville

- Location in Worcester County and the state of Massachusetts.
- Coordinates: 42°36′37″N 72°4′31″W
- Country: United States
- State: Massachusetts
- County: Worcester

Area
  - Total: 2.64 sq mi (6.85 km^{2})
  - Land: 2.57 sq mi (6.65 km^{2})
  - Water: 0.081 sq mi (0.21 km^{2})
- Elevation: 889 ft (271 m)

Population (2020)
  - Total: 2,117
  - Density: 825.1/sq mi (318.58/km^{2})
- Time zone: UTC-5 (Eastern (EST))
  - Summer (DST): UTC-4 (EDT)
- ZIP code: 01436
- Area code: 978
- FIPS code: 25-03355
- GNIS feature ID: 0609877

Baldwinville is an unincorporated village and census-designated place (CDP) in the town of Templeton in Worcester County, Massachusetts, United States. As of the 2020 census, Baldwinville had a population of 2,117. The name also refers to the local post office or railroad station.

== Geography ==
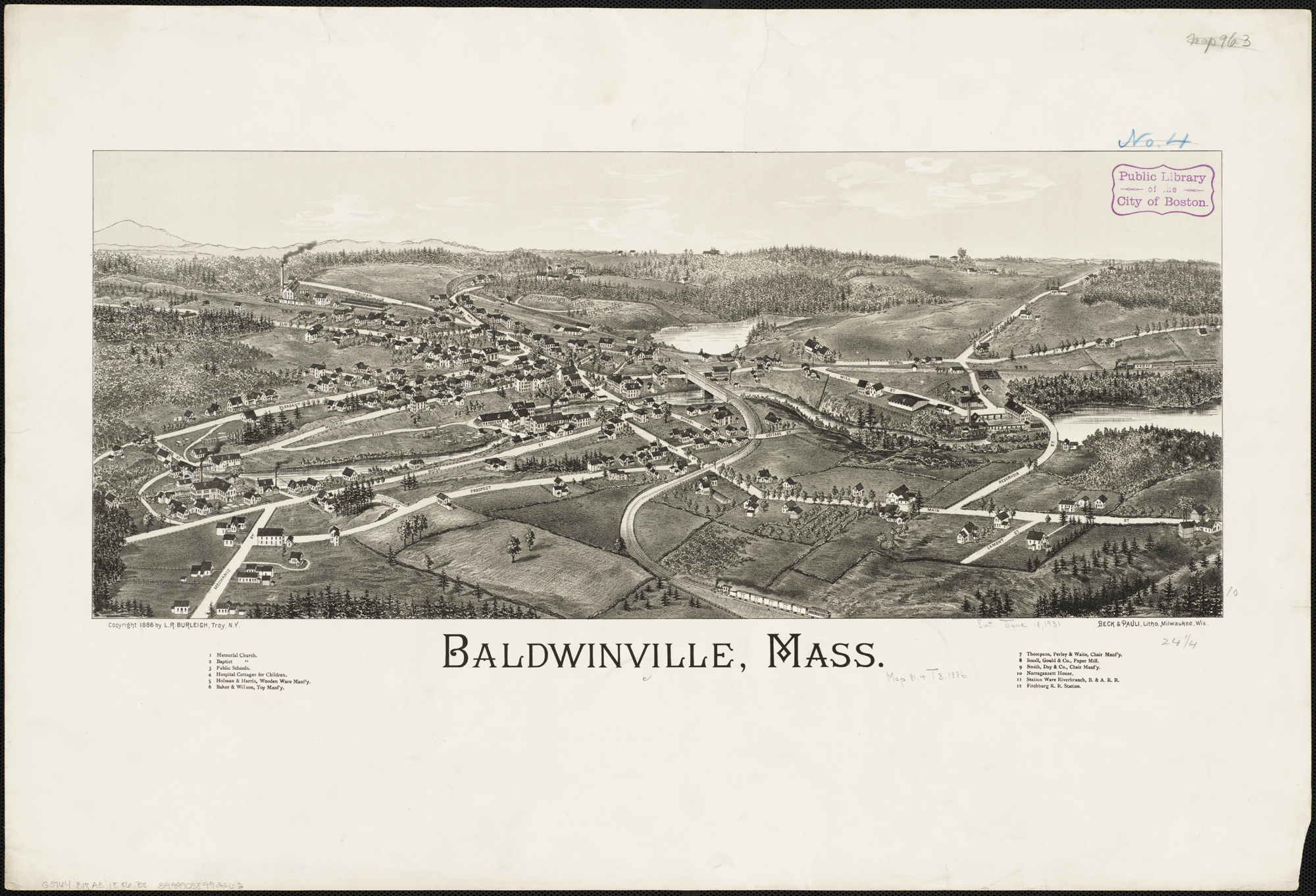
Print of Baldwinville by L.R. Burleigh with listing of landmarks

Baldwinville is located at 42°36′37″N 72°4′31″W (42.610167, -72.075239).

According to the United States Census Bureau, the CDP has a total area of 6.5 km^{2} (2.5 mi^{2}), of which 6.4 km^{2} (2.5 mi^{2}) is land and 0.1 km^{2} (0.04 mi^{2}) (0.80%) is water.

== Demographics ==
Historical population
Census	Pop.	Note	%±
2000	1,852		—
2010	2,028		9.5%
2020	2,117		4.4%
U.S. Decennial Census

=== 2020 census ===
As of the 2020 census, Baldwinville had a population of 2,117. The median age was 44.1 years. 21.3% of residents were under the age of 18 and 21.4% of residents were 65 years of age or older. For every 100 females there were 94.2 males, and for every 100 females age 18 and over there were 90.3 males age 18 and over.

0.0% of residents lived in urban areas, while 100.0% lived in rural areas.

There were 797 households in Baldwinville, of which 29.1% had children under the age of 18 living in them. Of all households, 43.8% were married-couple households, 19.1% were households with a male householder and no spouse or partner present, and 26.1% were households with a female householder and no spouse or partner present. About 27.9% of all households were made up of individuals and 13.6% had someone living alone who was 65 years of age or older.

There were 825 housing units, of which 3.4% were vacant. The homeowner vacancy rate was 0.2% and the rental vacancy rate was 0.0%.

Racial composition as of the 2020 census
Race	Number	Percent
White	1,947	92.0%
Black or African American	23	1.1%
American Indian and Alaska Native	2	0.1%
Asian	8	0.4%
Native Hawaiian and Other Pacific Islander	4	0.2%
Some other race	19	0.9%
Two or more races	114	5.4%
Hispanic or Latino (of any race)	98	4.6%

=== 2000 census ===
At the 2000 census there were 1,852 people, 677 households, and 465 families in the CDP. The population density was 288.3/km^{2} (748.1/mi^{2}). There were 700 housing units at an average density of 109.0/km^{2} (282.8/mi^{2}). The racial makeup of the CDP was 97.84% White, 0.16% Black or African American, 0.16% Native American, 0.49% Asian, 0.81% from other races, and 0.54% from two or more races. Hispanic or Latino of any race were 1.78%.

Of the 677 households 33.8% had children under the age of 18 living with them, 51.4% were married couples living together, 11.1% had a female householder with no husband present, and 31.3% were non-families. 26.1% of households were one person and 16.5% were one person aged 65 or older. The average household size was 2.58 and the average family size was 3.07.

The age distribution was 26.7% under the age of 18, 6.5% from 18 to 24, 29.5% from 25 to 44, 18.3% from 45 to 64, and 19.1% 65 or older. The median age was 37 years. For every 100 females, there were 89.0 males. For every 100 females age 18 and over, there were 83.6 males.

The median household income was $41,771 and the median family income was $50,170. Males had a median income of $37,542 versus $25,551 for females. The per capita income for the CDP was $17,108. About 6.0% of families and 9.6% of the population were below the poverty line, including 9.3% of those under age 18 and 18.2% of those age 65 or over.
