= Wachusett =

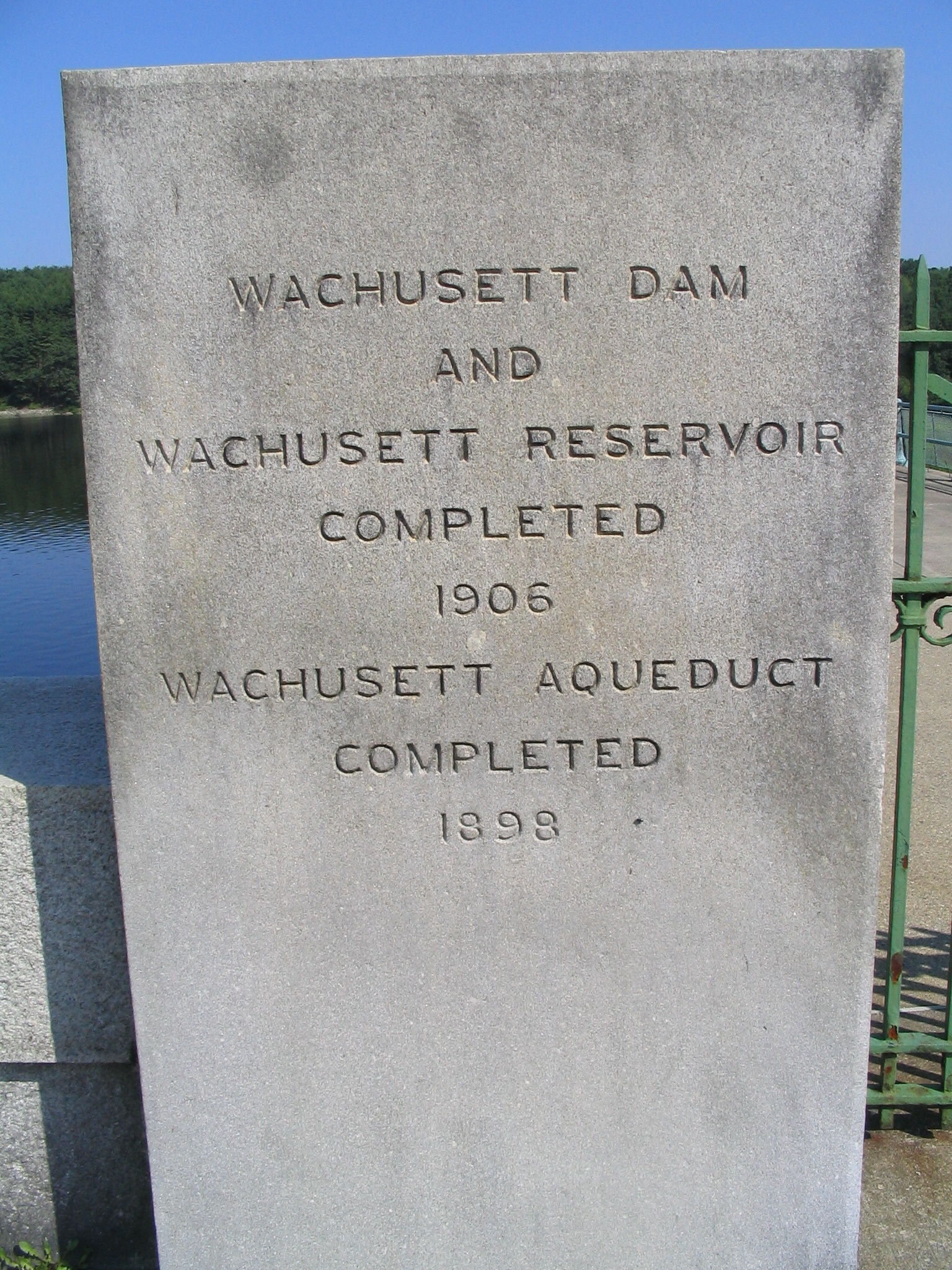
The plaque at Wachusett Dam and Reservoir

"Wachusett" (also spelled "Wachuset", "Watchusett", and "Watchuset") is a word derived from the Algonquian languages such as Nipmuc and Wompanoag, still spoken by the Native Americans of Massachusetts and is believed to approximate "near the mountain" or "mountain place". Wachusett was originally used as the name of a mountain in Massachusetts; other uses of the word (most of them local) have been derived directly from the name of the mountain.

Wachusett may refer to:

- Mount Wachusett, a mountain in Worcester County, Massachusetts
  - Wachusett Mountain (ski area), located on the mountain
  - Wachusett Mountain State Reservation, the park covering the mountain
  - A Walk to Wachusett, an essay by Henry David Thoreau about the author's journey to Mount Wachusett

Other geographic features

- Wachusett Aqueduct in Massachusetts
- Wachusett Dam in Clinton, Massachusetts
- Wachusett Reef, a coral reef in the Pacific Ocean reported in 1899 but never confirmed
- Wachusett Reservoir in Worcester County, Massachusetts
- Wachusett station, a commuter rail station in Fitchburg, Massachusetts
- Wachusett Street in the Forest Hills (Boston) area of Boston, Massachusetts

Institutions, schools, and organizations

- Mount Wachusett Community College in Gardner, Massachusetts
- Wachusett Hall at Assumption College
- Wachusett Regional High School in Holden, Massachusetts
- Wachusett Regional School District in Massachusetts

Businesses

- Wachusett Brewing Company in Westminster, Massachusetts
- Wachusett Dirt Dawgs, a collegiate summer baseball team in Leominster, Massachusetts
- Wachusett Potato Chip Company in Fitchburg, Massachusetts
- Wachusett Shirt Company, a historic building in Leominster, Massachusetts

Ships

- USS Wachusett (1861), a United States Navy sloop-of-war in commission from 1862 to 1868, from 1871 to 1874, and from 1879 to 1885
- USS Wachusett (ID-1840), a United States Navy cargo ship in commission from 1918 to 1919
- USS Wachusetts (SP-548), later USS SP-548, a United States Navy patrol vessel in commission from 1917 to 1919
