= 1842 in literature =

This article contains information about the literary events and publications of 1842.

== Events ==
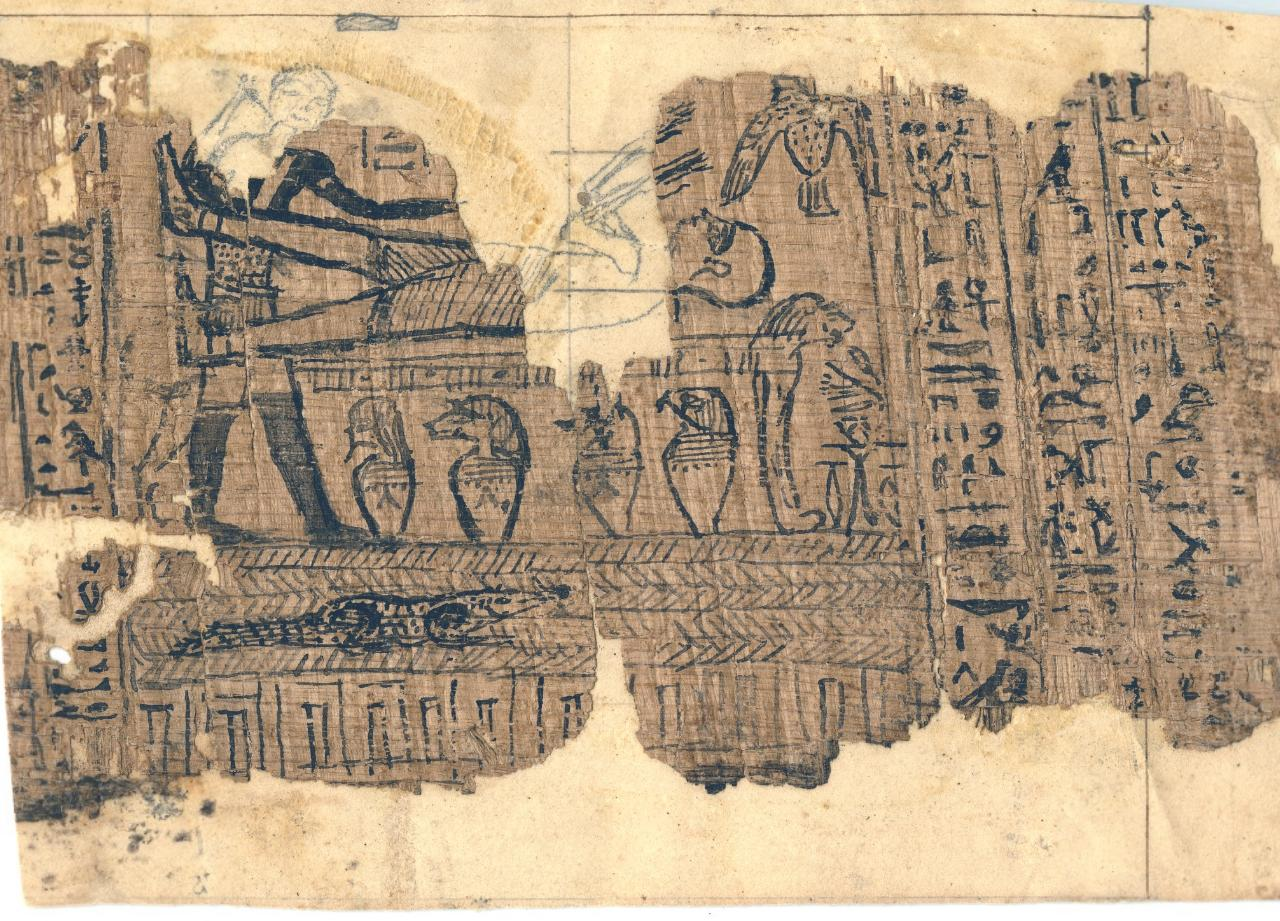
A portion of the papyri used by Joseph Smith as the source of the Book of Abraham.

- January 3 – Charles Dickens sets sail for the United States.
- February 14 – Washington Irving is one of the hosts at a public dinner for Charles Dickens in New York.
- March – The Book of Abraham by Joseph Smith is presented as being "a translation of some ancient records... purporting to be the writings of Abraham, while he was in Egypt, called the Book of Abraham, written by his own hand, upon papyrus." It is published in two installments in the Mormon periodical Times and Seasons.
- c. March 7 – Charles Dickens meets Edgar Allan Poe in Philadelphia.
- March 28 – The Teatr Skarbkowski in Lviv opens with the performance of a play by Franz Grillparzer.
- May 14
  - Alfred, Lord Tennyson, publishes his 2-volume collection Poems, which boosts his reputation; in 1850 Queen Victoria will name him poet laureate.
  - The Illustrated London News, the world's first illustrated weekly newspaper, begins publication
- June 7 – Charles Dickens leaves New York to return to England.
- June 19 – Eugène Sue's fictional The Mysteries of Paris (Les Mystères de Paris) begins to be serialized in the newspaper Journal des débats.
- July 1 – The Copyright Act in the United Kingdom provides for authors' copyrights in books to endure for the remainder of the author's life and a further seven years; if this period is less than 42 years from the date of first publication, then the copyright will persist for a full 42 years.
- unknown dates
  - Portions of Fanny Burney's diary and letters are posthumously published.
  - Julius Springer establishes a bookshop in Berlin which is the origin of Springer Science+Business Media.

== New books ==
=== Fiction ===
- Honoré de Balzac – La Rabouilleuse (The Black Sheep)
- Edward Bulwer – Zanoni
- James Fenimore Cooper – The Two Admirals
- Nikolai Gogol
  - Dead Souls («Мёртвые души», Mjórtvyje dúshi)
  - "The Overcoat" («Шинель», Shinel, short story)
- Catherine Gore – The Ambassador's Wife
- Jeremias Gotthelf – The Black Spider (Die schwarze Spinne)
- Juan Eugenio Hartzenbusch – Primero, yo (First, Myself)
- Samuel Lover – Handy Andy
- George Sand – Consuelo
- Albert Smith – The Adventures of Mr Ledbury
- Walt Whitman – Franklin Evans; or The Inebriate

=== Children ===
- Frederick Marryat – Percival Keene

=== Drama ===
- Jean-Louis Guez de Balzac – Les Ressources de Quinola (premieres in Paris, March 19)
- Nikolai Gogol
  - The Gamblers («Игроки», Igroki, approximate date of completion)
  - Marriage («Женитьба», Zhenit'ba, published)
- Gerald Griffin – Gisippus
- George William Lovell – Love's Sacrifice
- James Sheridan Knowles – The Rose of Arragon
- John Westland Marston – The Patrician's Daughter
- Johann Nestroy – Einen Jux will er sich machen (He Will Go on a Spree, musical adaptation)
- Eugène Scribe
  - Une Chaine
  - Le Verre d'eau

=== Poetry ===
- Aloysius Bertrand – Gaspard de la Nuit
- Robert Browning – Dramatic Lyrics (includes "My Last Duchess" and "The Pied Piper of Hamelin")
- Thomas Babington Macaulay – Lays of Ancient Rome
- Alfred Tennyson – Poems (includes "Locksley Hall", "Morte d'Arthur", etc.)
- Katharine Augusta Ware, The Power of the Passions and other Poems

=== Non-fiction ===
- Charles Dickens – American Notes
- Ralph Waldo Emerson – The Transcendentalist
- Victor Hugo – Le Rhin
- Udney Hay Jacob – Peace Maker
- George Sand – Un Hiver à Majorque (A Winter in Majorca)
- William Smith – A Dictionary of Greek and Roman Antiquities
- Henry David Thoreau – A Walk to Wachusett
- George Catlin - Letters and Notes on the Customs and Manners of the North American Indians

== Births ==
- January 20 – Agnes Leonard Hill, American author, journalist, evangelist, social reformer (died 1917)
- January 26
  - François Coppée, French author, le poète des humbles (died 1908)
  - Hattie Tyng Griswold, American author (died 1909)
- February 4 – Arrigo Boito, Italian poet (died 1918)
- February 11 – Maria Louise Eve, American author (died 1900)
- February 25 – Karl May, German popular novelist (died 1912)
- March 4 – Evelyn Magruder DeJarnette, American author (died 1914)
- March 17 – Belle C. Greene, American humor writer (died 1926)
- March 18 – Stéphane Mallarmé, French Symbolist poet (died 1898)
- March 25 – Antonio Fogazzaro, Italian novelist (died 1911)
- June 24 – Ambrose Bierce, American writer (presumed died 1914)
- July 7 – William Hastie, Scottish scholar (died 1903)
- July 11 – Henry Abbey, American poet (died 1911)
- December 23 – Frances Augusta Conant, American journalist and editor (died 1903)
- December 31 – Iacob Negruzzi, Romanian poet, columnist and memoirist (died 1932)

== Deaths ==
- March 23 – Stendhal, French novelist (stroke, born 1783)
- April 7 – Margaret Prior, American memoirist (born 1773)
- May 23 – José de Espronceda, Spanish poet (diphtheria, born 1808)
- June 5 – Thomas Henry Lister, English novelist and Registrar General (born 1800)
- June 17 – Frances Jacson, English novelist (born 1754)
- July 28 – Clemens Brentano, German poet and novelist (born 1778)
- October 23 – Wilhelm Gesenius, German Biblical commentator (born 1786)
- November 6 – William Hone, English satirist and bookseller (born 1780)
- December 7 – Thomas Hamilton, Scottish novelist and philosopher (born 1789)
