= Wachusett Mountain =

Wachusett Mountain may refer to:

- Mount Wachusett, the highest point in Worcester County, Massachusetts
- Wachusett Mountain (ski area), the name of a ski area on the same mountain
