= USS Wachusetts (SP-548) =

Armed motorboat of the United States Navy

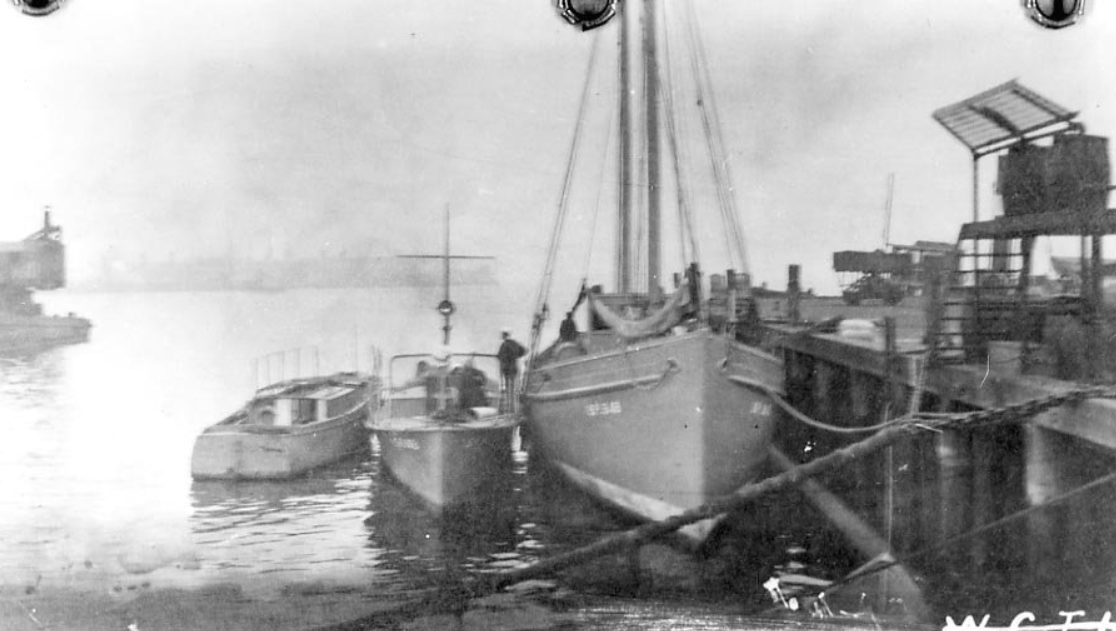
- USS SP-548 (right) with two other section patrol boats in 1918 or 1919.

History

United States
- Name: W.C.T.U. (1916); Wachusetts (1916–1917)
- Owner: Private owners
- Builder: W. A. and S. D. Moss, Friendship, Maine
- Completed: 1916
- Fate: Sold to U.S. Navy 26 April 1917

United States NavyUnited States
- Name: USS Wachusetts
- Namesake: Previous name retained
- Cost: US$18,000
- Acquired: 26 April 1917
- Renamed: USS SP-548 in 1918
- Stricken: 25 October 1919
- Fate: Transferred to U.S. Bureau of Fisheries 1919

U.S. Bureau of Fisheries
- Name: USFS Fulmar
- Namesake: Fulmar, a tubenosed seabird of the family Procellariidae
- Acquired: 1919
- Identification: WTFC
- Fate: Transferred to Ohio Division of Conservation 1933–1934 (see text)

United States
- Name: Fulmar
- Namesake: Previous name retained
- Owner: State of Ohio
- Operator: Ohio Division of Conservation
- Acquired: 1933–1934 (see text)

General characteristics (as U.S. Navy patrol vessel)
- Type: Patrol vessel
- Tonnage: 65 GRT
- Length: 101 ft 0 in (30.78 m)
- Beam: 16 ft 6 in (5.03 m)
- Draft: 7 ft 0 in (2.13 m) f.
- Propulsion: 1 x 120 ihp (89 kW) Neisco diesel engine, 1,200 US gal (4,500 L; 1,000 imp gal) fuel
- Speed: 12 knots (22 km/h; 14 mph)
- Complement: 6 or 17 (see text)
- Armament: 1 × 3-pounder gun; 2 × .30-caliber (7.62-millimeter) machine guns

USS Wachusetts (SP-548) was an armed motorboat that served in the United States Navy as a patrol vessel from 1917 to 1919. She was renamed SP-548 during her period of service. In 1919 she was transferred to the United States Bureau of Fisheries and renamed USFS Fulmar, and operated as a fisheries science research vessel on the Great Lakes until 1933 or 1934, when she was transferred to the Ohio Division of Conservation.

== Construction and early history ==
Wachusetts was built as the private motorboat W.C.T.U. in 1916 by W. A. and S. D. Moss of Friendship, Maine. She was powered by a 120 indicated horsepower (89 kW) Neisco diesel engine and carried 1,200 US gallons (4,500 L; 1,000 imp gal) of fuel. She soon was renamed Wachusetts.

== U.S. Navy service ==
The U.S. Navy purchased Wachusetts for US$18,000 from the Howard Lumber Company of Boston, Massachusetts, for World War I service as a patrol boat in the section patrol. The Navy took possession of her on 26 April 1917 and commissioned her as USS Wachusetts (SP-548). The Dictionary of American Naval Fighting Ships gives her crew in Navy service as six, but U.S. Navy Bureau of Construction and Repair data show a crew of two officers and fifteen men.

Little is known of her U.S. Navy activities because her deck logs have been lost. As of 1 February 1918, Wachusetts was operating out of the section base at Boothbay, Maine, probably on local patrol duties, under the aegis of Commandant, 1st Naval District. Her commanding officer as of that time was Ensign J. B. Eckroll, USNRF.

The name Wachusetts apparently was dropped somewhat later to avoid confusion with USS Wachusett (ID-1840), a cargo ship commissioned in January 1918 that served until October 1919, and the patrol boat became simply USS SP-548. Sometime after the conclusion of World War I, SP-548 was decommissioned, and she was struck from the Navy List on 25 October 1919.

== U.S. Bureau of Fisheries service ==
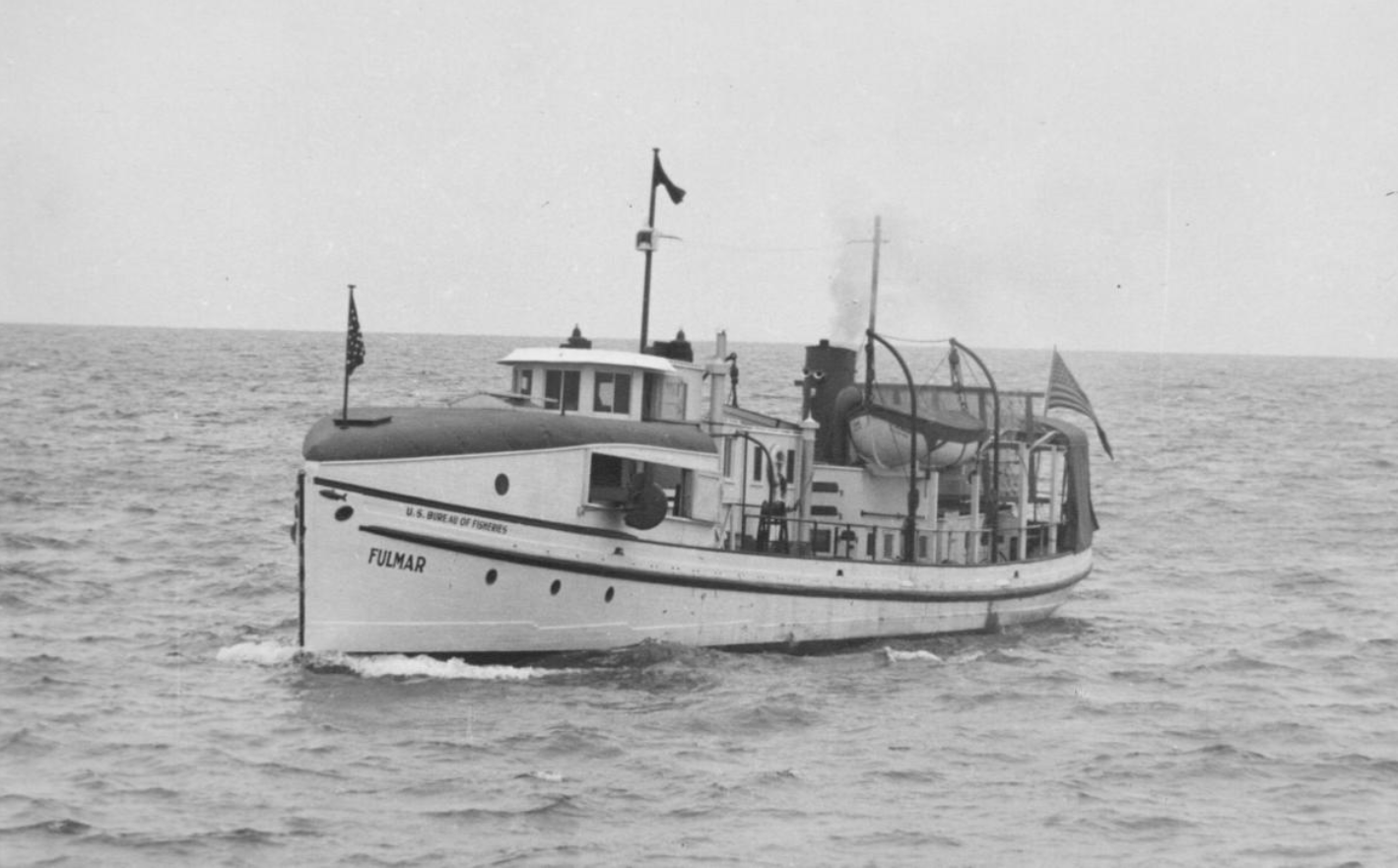
USFS Fulmar on a scientific cruise in the Great Lakes, circa 1931

By authority of an Executive Order of 24 May 1919, the U.S. Navy transferred three former section patrol boats – SP-548, Cobra, and Calypso – to the United States Bureau of Fisheries (BOF) for service as fishery patrol vessels in the Territory of Alaska. The vessels were turned over to the BOF at Quincy, Massachusetts, and towed to Woods Hole, Massachusetts, by the BOF steamer USFS Phalarope. Phalarope then towed Cobra, renamed USFS Petrel, and Calypso, renamed USFS Merganser, to Norfolk, Virginia, for transport to the Pacific Northwest aboard the collier Neptune, but SP-548, renamed USFS Fulmar, remained at the BOF's Woods Hole station for later shipment.

After Fulmar arrived at Woods Hole, the BOF changed its plans for her. Instead of the originally planned Alaskan patrol service, the BOF decided to base her at Charlevoix, Michigan, and assign her to fish culture operations on Lake Michigan. During July, September, and October 1921, Phalarope′s crew modified Fulmar at Woods Hole for use as a fisheries science research vessel, including installation of a deckhouse from bow to pilothouse; and supported her transfer to Charlevoix.

Stationed at Charlevoix as the first research vessel at the BOF station there – which eventually became the United States Geological Survey′s Great Lakes Science Center – Fulmar was assigned initially to studying the prevention of the destruction of undersized and immature fish by commercial gillnetting. She conducted the first experimental fishing survey in Lake Michigan from 1930 through 1932 using linen gill nets.

During fiscal year 1934 (which ran from July 1, 1933 to June 30, 1934) the BOF turned Fulmar over to the State of Ohio.

== Ohio Division of Conservation ==
The State of Ohio placed Fulmar in service with the Ohio Division of Conservation, stationing her at Put in Bay station in Ohio on Lake Erie. Her later history is unavailable.
