= Merganser (disambiguation) =

A merganser is a fish-eating duck of the genus Mergus – also known as the "typical mergansers" – in the subfamily Anatinae.

Merganser may also refer to:

- MV Merganser, a bulk carrier of the Canadian Forest Navigation Group
- HMS Merganser, also known as RNAS Rattray, a former Royal Navy air station
- USFS Merganser, a United States Bureau of Fisheries and (as US FWS Merganser) Fish and Wildlife Service fishery patrol boat in commission from 1919 to 1942
- USS Merganser, various United States Navy ships
- Hooded merganser, a species of duck of the genus Lophodytes
- Percival Merganser, a light civil transport aircraft of the late 1940s
- Smew, a species of duck of the genus Margellus also known as the white merganser
