= USCGC Wachusett =

USCGC Wachusett is the name of the following ships of the United States Coast Guard:

- USCGC Wachusett (WPG-42), commissioned as USCGC Sebago (WHEC-42) in 1945, scrapped in 1974
- USCGC Wachusett (WHEC-44), launched in 1944, in commission 1946–1973, scrapped in 1974

== See also ==
- USS Wachusett, ships of the U.S. Navy
- Wachusett (disambiguation)
