= USFC Phalarope =

U.S. fisheries research vessel

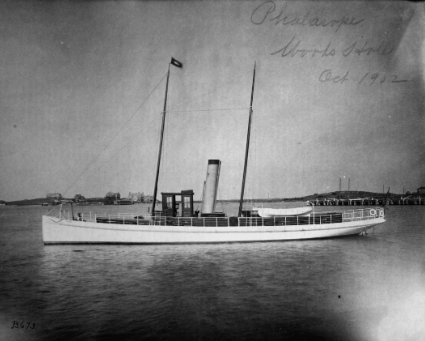

History

United States
- Name: Adelita
- Owner: Private ownership
- Completed: 1881
- Home port: Boston, Massachusetts
- Fate: Sold to U.S. Fish Commission 23 November 1899

U.S. Fish Commission
- Name: USFC Phalarope
- Namesake: Phalarope, a slender-necked shorebird in the genus Phalaropus of the family Scolopacidae
- Acquired: 23 November 1899
- Commissioned: May 1900
- Home port: Woods Hole, Massachusetts
- Identification: GVQH
- Fate: To U.S. Bureau of Fisheries 1 July 1903

U.S. Bureau of Fisheries
- Name: USFS Phalarope
- Namesake: Previous name retained
- Acquired: 1 July 1903
- Home port: Woods Hole, Massachusetts
- Identification: GVQH
- Fate: Transferred to U.S. Navy 19 May 1917
- Acquired: Transferred from U.S. Navy 2 August 1919
- Fate: Retired 1932–1933 (see text)

United States Navy
- Name: USS Phalarope
- Namesake: Previous name retained
- Acquired: 19 May 1917
- Decommissioned: Late 1918 or in 1919
- Home port: Woods Hole, Massachusetts
- Fate: Transferred to U.S. Bureau of Fisheries 2 August 1919

General characteristics (as fisheries vessel)
- Type: Fisheries research vessel
- Tonnage: 55 GRT; 27 NRT
- Length: 82 ft (25.0 m)
- Beam: 16 ft 3 in (5.0 m)
- Depth: 7.4 ft (2.3 m)
- Propulsion: Steam engine
- Crew: 6 plus other embarked personnel

General characteristics (as U.S. Navy vessel)
- Type: Patrol vessel
- Displacement: 55 tons
- Length: 92 ft (28.0 m)
- Beam: 16 ft (4.9 m)
- Draft: 7 ft 8 in (2.3 m)
- Propulsion: Steam engine
- Speed: 12 knots (22 km/h; 14 mph)
- Crew: 10
- Armament: 1 x 1-pounder gun; 1 x machine gun

USFC Phalarope was an American fish culture and fisheries science research vessel that operated along the coast of New England. She was part of the fleet of the United States Commission on Fish and Fisheries, generally referred to as the United States Fish Commission, from 1900 to 1903 and in the fleet of its successor, the United States Bureau of Fisheries, as USFS Phalarope from 1903 until 1917 and again from 1919 until fiscal year 1933. She was in commission in the United States Navy as the patrol vessel USS Phalarope from 1917 to 1919, seeing service during World War I. Before her United States Government service, she was the steam yacht Adelita.

== Service history ==
=== Early history ===
The vessel was constructed as the steam yacht Adelita in the East Boston section of Boston, Massachusetts, in 1881. In private use, her home port was Boston.

=== U.S. Fish Commission ===
Several years after the U.S. Fish Commission had identified a requirement for a large and seaworthy steamer capable of operating well offshore to support its stations in New England for both fish culture and fisheries science research, the United States Congress authorized the purchase of such a vessel on 3 March 1899. The Fish Commission chose Adelita, purchased her on 23 November 1899, and renamed her Phalarope. She was commissioned as USFC Phalarope in May 1900. The Fish Commission assigned her to its station at Woods Hole, Massachusetts. She soon established the annual routine for her career, which involved supporting fish-culture work at Woods Hole and on the Potomac River at the fish hatchery at Bryans Point, Maryland.

In June 1903, Phalarope transported live lobster fry from the fish hatchery at the Fish Commission's Woods Hole station to the Rhode Island Commission of Inland Fisheries floating laboratory at Wickford, Rhode Island, which participated in Fish Commission experiments in breeding lobsters.

=== U.S. Bureau of Fisheries (1903–1917) ===
By an Act of Congress of 14 February 1903, the U.S. Fish Commission became part of the newly created United States Department of Commerce and Labor and was reorganized as the United States Bureau of Fisheries, with both the transfer and the name change effective on 1 July 1903. As USFS Phalarope, Phalarope became part of the Bureau of Fisheries fleet and continued her annual routine of supporting fish-culture activities at Woods Hole and Bryans Point.

During fiscal year 1904 (1 July 1903–30 June 1904), new copper tanks were installed aboard Phalarope and alterations were made to her engine room and cabin. During the research seasons of both 1904 and 1905, she joined the Bureau of Fisheries research vessel USFS Fish Hawk in dredging the waters in the vicinity of Woods Hole as part of a biological survey of the area's marine life, contributing to an ultimate goal of compiling and cataloguing records of the distribution of all the fauna and flora of the region. An accident in 1905 prevented Phalarope from completing her dredging operations in western Buzzards Bay that summer and delayed further dredging there until 1907, but Phalarope returned to the dredging operations, joining Fish Hawk and the launch Blue Wing in them in the summers of 1906, 1907, 1908, and 1909.

By November 1912, Phalarope was involved in the autumn collection of cod eggs off Sagamore, Massachusetts, for the Woods Hole station. In early 1913, she operated on the Potomac River to collect yellow perch eggs from commercial fishermen and transfer them to a scow anchored in Occoquan Bay on the river's Virginia shoreline that had been converted into a floating fish hatchery. From late November 1913 to 9 January 1914, she again collected cod eggs off Sagamore. In autumn 1914, the Bureau of Fisheries stationed her off Plymouth, Massachusetts, for the collection of cod eggs. Each spring from 1915 through 1917, she operated on the Potomac River to assist in hatching American shad.

=== U.S. Navy ===
The United States entered World War I on 6 April 1917, and on 19 May 1917 the United States Navy took over Phalarope for war service. After converting her for use as a patrol vessel, the Navy commissioned her as USS Phalarope on 6 December 1917.

The Navy assigned Phalarope to the section patrol and based her at Woods Hole. She patrolled from Woods Hole through the end of World War I on 11 November 1918 and in its immediate aftermath. After the Navy decommissioned her, it handed her back to the Bureau of Fisheries on 29 July 1919 and officially transferred her back to the Bureau on 2 August 1919.

=== U.S. Bureau of Fisheries (1919–1930s) ===
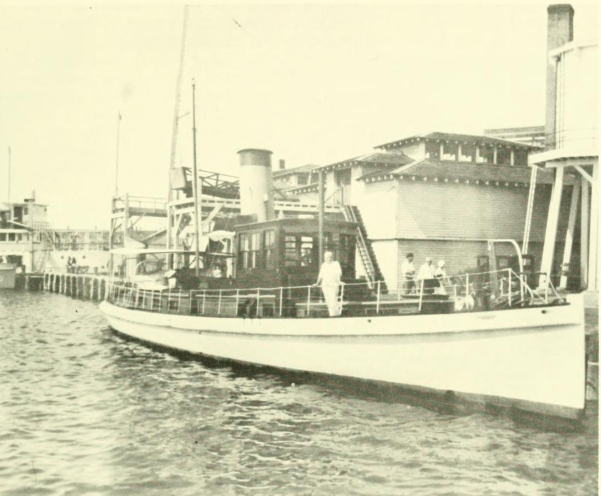
USFS Phalarope tied up at the Bureau of Fisheries dock at Woods Hole, Massachusetts.

Phalarope once again became USFS Phalarope. The Bureau of Fisheries reported to the United States Secretary of Commerce in 1919 that the Navy had returned her in good condition.

Under an executive order dated 24 May 1919 addressing the disposition of vessels the Navy no longer required, the Navy transferred several decommissioned patrol vessels, including USS Calypso (SP-632) and USS Cobra (SP-626), to the Bureau of Fisheries, which took possession of Calypso and Cobra at Quincy, Massachusetts, in July 1919. After her own return to the Bureau, Phalarope towed Calypso and Cobra, which the Bureau had renamed USFS Merganser and USFS Petrel, respectively, to Woods Hole. She then towed Merganser and Petrel to the Norfolk Navy Yard at Portsmouth, Virginia, so that they could be loaded aboard the U.S. Navy collier USS Neptune (AC-8) for transportation to the Territory of Alaska, where they were to serve as fishery patrol vessels. After the Bureau took possession of the former Navy patrol vessel USS SP-548 – which the Bureau renamed USFS Fulmar – at Quincy in October 1919, Phalarope towed her to Woods Hole.

Phalarope returned to her routine pre-war duties, supporting fish culture work at the Bureau of Fisheries stations at Woods Hole and on the Potomac River at Bryans Point, Maryland, and later at Fort Humphreys, Virginia. Due to a lack of operating funds during fiscal year 1922 (1 July 1921–30 June 1922), her operations were very limited, only occurring at Woods Hole and only during August 1921; her crew was occupied during July, September, and October 1921 with getting USFS Fulmar prepared for fisheries work and with transferring Fulmar from Woods Hole to her new home port at Charlevoix, Michigan.

During the summer and autumn of 1923, Phalarope made several cruises in Buzzards Bay and Vineyard Sound using a 6-foot (1.8 m) young-fish trawl and plankton nets to support a study of the seasonal distribution of the species occurring in the Woods Hole area in relation to temperature, salinity, and other physical factors and particularly in relation to the other organisms occurring with them. The information gathered for the study also formed the basis for a later study of the food of larval fish. Late in October 1923 she was stationed at the eastern entrance to the Cape Cod Canal for the annual collection of cod eggs for the Bureau of Fisheries Woods Hole fish hatchery.

During the summer of 1924, Phalarope joined the Bureau of Fisheries steamer USFS Gannet in using seining and trawling to conduct a survey of the coast between Mount Desert, Maine, and Woods Hole to support an investigation of the early development of cod, haddock, and pollock off the New England coast by gathering information on the migrations, feeding habits, and enemies of the young fish after they leave the surface waters and enter the shallow shore zone. During the rest of fiscal year 1925 (1 July 1924–30 June 1925) she followed her usual routine of fish culture work at Woods Hole and Bryans Point.

A 1962 publication of the Bureau of Fisheries′ successor organization, the United States Fish and Wildlife Service, described Phalarope′s typical working day at the Bureau's Woods Hole station during the 1920s as follows:

The working day at the Fisheries Laboratory usually started with a collecting trip to fish traps, or for dredging or taking plankton samples. The small coal-burning steamer Phalarope under the command of Capt[ain] R. N. Veeder, was used for this purpose. Fisheries biologists and M[arine] B[iological] L[aboratory] investigators interested in making a trip were welcome. A group desiring to get aboard usually gathered by 9:00 a.m. at the Fisheries dock. Many persons wanted to watch the dredging or seining and were not concerned with obtaining the material. Robert A. Goffin, collector for the Fisheries Laboratory, and two fish culturists formed the collecting crew.

With the exception of long trips, which sometimes lasted the whole day, the Phalarope would return about noontime, early enough for the participants to change and be ready for their luncheon, which was served by the MBL mess hall sharply at 1:30 p.m. The collecting trip became so popular, especially when the weather was good, that the number of passengers on board had to be restricted to conform to safety regulations enforced by the United States Coast Guard. If something exciting happened during the trip, for instance the catch of a big shark or large moonfish, everybody would dash to one side of the vessel and cause a dangerous list. In later years, Capt[ain] Veeder refused to take more than 20 persons aboard.

In addition to the material needed for research at the Fisheries and collected by the scientists themselves or under their supervision, the Phalarope brought live fishes for the aquarium, which was open to the public every day of the week.

United States Department of Commerce records list Phalarope as being in the Bureau of Fisheries fleet as of 30 June 1932 but not as of 30 June 1933, indicating that the Bureau retired her sometime during fiscal year 1933 (1 July 1932–30 June 1933).
