= Marold =

Marold may refer to:

- Luděk Marold (1865-1898), a Czech painter
- USS Marold (SP-737), a United States Navy patrol boat in commission from 1917 to 1919
