= USS Cobra =

U.S. naval ship

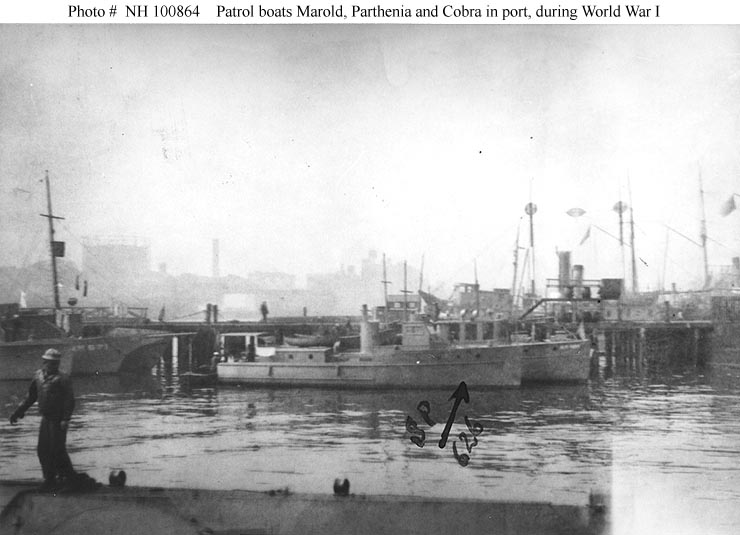
- USS Cobra (SP-626) is at the center of this photograph taken in a New England port during World War I. An unidentified patrol boat is tied up inboard of her; the bows of the patrol boats USS Parthenia and USS Marold are visible at left, tied up alongside each other, with Parthenia inboard; and the submarine USS L-10 is in the foreground.

History

United States
- Name: Cobra
- Namesake: Cobra, the common name of various elapid snakes, most of which belong to the genus Naja
- Cost: US$14,000
- Completed: 1917
- Fate: Sold to U.S. Navy 19 September 1917

United States Navy
- Name: USS Cobra
- Acquired: 19 September 1917
- Commissioned: 4 November 1917
- Identification: SP-626
- Fate: Transferred to U.S. Bureau of Fisheries 9 September 1919

U.S. Bureau of Fisheries
- Name: USFS Petrel
- Namesake: Petrel, a tube-nosed seabird in the bird order Procellariiformes
- Acquired: 9 September 1919
- Decommissioned: 1934
- Identification: WTFF

General characteristics (as private motorboat)
- Type: Motorboat
- Propulsion: 350–400 hp (261–298 kW) Dusenberg engine
- Capacity: 7 passengers and crew

General characteristics (as U.S. Navy patrol boat)
- Type: Patrol vessel
- Length: 53.7 ft (16.4 m)
- Propulsion: 350–400 hp (261–298 kW) Dusenberg engine

General characteristics (as BOF patrol boat)
- Type: Fishery patrol vessel
- Tonnage: 23 GRT; 15 NRT
- Length: 54 ft (16.5 m)
- Beam: 11 ft (3.4 m)
- Draft: 2.5 ft (0.8 m)
- Propulsion: 1919: 350–400 hp (261–298 kW) Dusenberg engine; 1922: 25 hp (19 kW) Standard engine; 1927: 50 hp (37 kW), 4-cylinder Cummins engine
- Speed: 26 knots (48 km/h; 30 mph) (average)
- Range: 8,400 nautical miles (15,600 km; 9,700 mi)

USS Cobra (SP-626) was a United States Navy patrol vessel in commission from 1917 to 1919 that operated during World War I. She originally was constructed as a private motorboat. After the conclusion of her U.S. Navy career, she served as the fishery patrol vessel USFS Petrel for the United States Bureau of Fisheries from 1919 to 1934, operating in the waters of the Territory of Alaska.

== Construction ==
Cobra was built as a private motorboat of the same name at Lynn, Massachusetts, in 1917 at a cost of US$14,000. She had one mast and could accommodate seven passengers and crew.

== U.S. Navy service ==
On 19 September 1917, the U.S. Navy acquired Cobra for use as a section patrol boat during World War I. She was commissioned as USS Cobra (SP-626) on 19 September 1917. Assigned to the 1st Naval District in northern New England, Cobra performed patrol duty for the rest of World War I.

World War I ended on 11 November 1918, and sometime thereafter the Navy decommissioned Cobra. Under an executive order dated 24 May 1919 addressing the disposition of vessels the Navy no longer required, Cobra was among several vessels designated for transfer to the United States Bureau of Fisheries (BOF). The Navy duly transferred her to the BOF on 9 September 1919.

== U.S. Bureau of Fisheries service ==
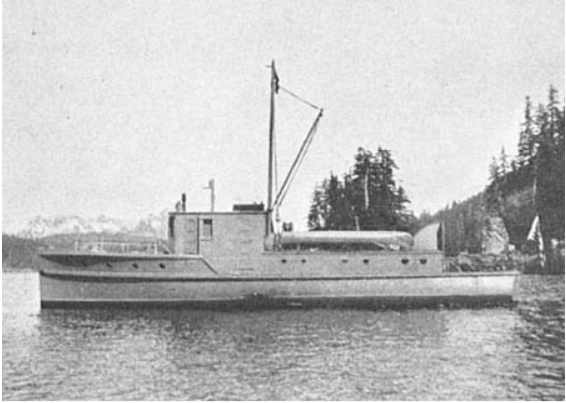
USFS Petrel in 1924.

Prior to Cobra's official transfer, the Bureau of Fisheries took possession of her at Quincy, Massachusetts, in July 1919 and renamed her USFS Petrel. The BOF vessel USFS Phalarope towed Petrel and another former U.S. Navy patrol boat, the BOF vessel USFS Merganser, from Quincy to the Norfolk Navy Yard in Portsmouth, Virginia. There Petrel and Merganser were loaded aboard the U.S. Navy collier USS Neptune on 3 October 1919. Neptune transported them to the Puget Sound Navy Yard in Bremerton, Washington, arriving there in early 1920. After they were unloaded, Petrel and Merganser were taken to Seattle, Washington, to undergo inspection.

After the inspections were complete, Petrel and Merganser were loaded aboard the Pacific American Fisheries steamer Redwood, which transported them to Kings Cove, Territory of Alaska, where Redwood arrived on 18 June 1920. The BOF intended to use them to conduct fishery patrols in the waters of Alaska, but withheld them from service, and instead sent them back to Seattle for repairs and to modify them for fishery patrol work as funds became available for the repairs and modifications. Petrel's modifications took place in early 1922; they involved general remodeling, re-decking, and the replacement of her original 350–400-horsepower (261–298 kW) Dusenberg engine with a more economical 25-horsepower (19 kW) Standard engine removed from the BOF vessel USFS Auklet when Auklet underwent an engine upgrade. Early in the summer of 1922, Auklet towed Petrel to Wrangell, Territory of Alaska, from which Petrel finally began her annual patrol duties, operating in the waters of Southeast Alaska.

Petrel's engine eventually broke down, and she was laid up during the 1926 fishing season. After the installation of a new 50-horsepower (37 kW), four-cylinder Cummins engine, she resumed her patrol duties on 20 September 1927. During 1930, she was involved in enforcing laws protecting fur seal populations near Sitka, Territory of Alaska.

Petrel's last BOF service took place during the 1934 fishing season. At the conclusion of the season, she was decommissioned at Seattle.
