= USS Marold =

Patrol vessel of the United States Navy

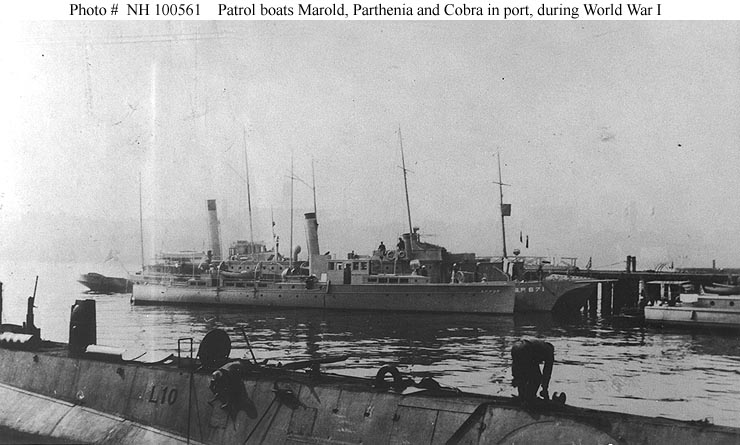
- In a New England port during World War I, USS Marold (SP-737) is at center with the patrol vessel USS Parthenia (SP-671) tied up inboard of her. The stern of the patrol vessel USS Cobra (SP-626) is visible at right. In the foreground is the submarine USS L-10 (Submarine No. 50).

History

United States
- Name: USS Marold
- Namesake: Previous name retained
- Builder: Matthews Boat Company, Port Clinton, Ohio
- Completed: 1914
- Acquired: 1917
- Commissioned: 2 June 1917
- Identification: official number 213511
- Fate: Returned to owner 9 May 1919
- Notes: Operated as private motorboat Marold 1914-1917 and from 1919

General characteristics
- Type: Patrol vessel
- Tonnage: 35 gross register tons
- Length: 100 ft (30 m)
- Beam: 12 ft 6 in (3.81 m)
- Draft: 4 ft 6 in (1.37 m)
- Speed: 20 knots
- Complement: 14
- Armament: 2 × 3-pounder guns; 2 × machine guns

USS Marold (SP-737) was a United States Navy patrol vessel in commission from 1917 to 1919.

== High speed motor yacht ==
Marold was built as a private, high speed motor yacht for Childe Harold Wills by the Matthews Boat Company, Port Clinton, Ohio, in 1914. (Note: A contemporary term for such large, fast yachts was "express cruiser.") The name is a compound of the owners given names, Mabel and Harold.

The yacht was designed by M. J. H. Wells to meet a requirement for a speed of 30 knots (35 mph; 56 km/h) with triple screws driven by three four stroke, eight cylinder, 300 horsepower Sterling Engine Company engines designed specifically for naval coast defense craft and fast yachts. The engines were arranged with one being forward of a pair with controls between the two engines. Gasoline engines were considered expensive to operate with the note that at full speed the engines would use 95 gallons and at ten cents a gallon an hour's operation would cost $9.50 plus lube oil. The fuel capacity was 2,800 US gallons (11,000 L) giving about thirty hours of full speed operation.

Marold was 100 ft (30.5 m) overall length, 99 ft 3 in (30.3 m) on the waterline, 12 ft 6 in (3.8 m) extreme breadth with a draft of 3 ft (0.9 m). Later Navy figures were almost identical but with a mean draft of 3 ft 9 in (1.1 m). In addition, with the Van Blerck engines, the fuel capacity of 2,300 US gallons (8,700 L) gave an endurance of 694 nautical miles (799 mi; 1,285 km), though with a maximum speed of only 20 knots (23 mph; 37 km/h) which is notably slower than the yacht's racing performance.

Wills was an avid racer, member of the Detroit Boat Club and Detroit Yacht Club, with several motor speedboats and one hydroplane, Baby Marold, to which Marold would be tender as well as a racer in itself. Though speed was the primary design factor Wills intended to use the yacht for cruising including ocean cruising to Florida and the Bahamas. The yacht had crew accommodation forward, a dining saloon and galley, a lounge that could be converted into two single staterooms aft and bathroom adjoining the owner's stateroom. On registration Marold was assigned the official number 213511 and signal letters LDNK with home port of Detroit.

Two years after launch Marold underwent overhaul at Matthews with modifications for replacement of the three original engines with four eight cylinder Van Blerck engines to likely become the fastest express cruiser on the Great Lakes and perhaps in the nation. About May 1917 the yacht was purchased by Louis K. Liggett of Chestnut Hill, Pennsylvania, founder of Rexall and later chairman of United Drug Company, who brought the yacht to Boston from Detroit by way of the Erie Canal and the Hudson River. On 3 June 1917 Liggett turned the yacht over to the government for use in the First Naval District.

== Navy acquisition ==
The U.S. Navy acquired Marold under a free lease from Liggett for use as a section patrol vessel during World War I. She was commissioned as USS Marold (SP-737) on 2 June 1917.

Assigned to the 1st Naval District in northern New England and based at Rockland, Maine, Marold carried out patrol duties for the rest of World War I. Marold was returned to Liggett on 9 May 1919.
