= USS Merganser =

USS Merganser may refer to the following ships of the United States Navy:

- USS Merganser (AM-135), was originally the commercial trawler Annapolis acquired by the US Navy 3 January 1942 and decommissioned 1 May 1944
- USS Merganser (AM-405), would have been a minesweeper but the contract for her construction was canceled 12 August 1945
- USS Merganser (AMS-26), was launched as YMS-417 29 June 1944, redesignated AMS‑26 and named Merganser 17 February 1947 and decommissioned 2 April 1958.

== See also ==
- USS Calypso (SP-632), which served as the fishery patrol vessel Merganser in the United States Bureau of Fisheries from 1919 to 1940 and the Fish and Wildlife Service from 1940 to 1942.
