= USS Wachusett =

USS Wachusett has been the name of more than one United States Navy ship, and may refer to:

- USS Wachusett (1861), a sloop-of-war in commission from 1862 to 1868, from 1871 to 1874, and from 1879 to 1885
- USS Wachusett (ID-1840), a cargo ship in commission from 1918 to 1919

== See also ==
- USS Wachusetts (SP-548), an armed motorboat in service from 1917 to 1919
