= Michael W. Rice =

American businessman (1943–2026)

Michael W. Rice (December 9, 1943 – October 10, 2026) was an American businessman who was director, chairman emeritus and special advisor to Utz of Utz Quality Foods, Inc. He was previously executive chairman, which he assumed in December 2012 following his role as chairman of the board and chief executive officer of Utz from 1992 until 2012. Rice was president and chief executive officer of Utz from 1978 until 1992. Prior to being CEO, was executive vice president of Utz from 1970 to 1978.

Rice was born on December 9, 1943, the son of Francis Xavier Rice and Arlene (Utz) Rice of Hanover, Pennsylvania. He was an alumnus of Mount St. Mary's University class of 1965, and held a law degree from George Washington University Law School.

He was also a member of the board of managers of the Utz Members. During his tenure as CEO of Utz, he led the expansion of the company to most of the Eastern United States with revenues exceeding $500 million per year in 2009.

Rice died in Hershey, Pennsylvania, on October 10, 2026, at the age of 82. He was the father-in-law of Dylan Lissette, who is CEO of Utz.
