= Utz Brands =

U.S. food company

Utz Brands, Inc.
- Type: Private
- Founded: 1921; 105 years ago
- Founders: William and Salie Utz
- Headquarters: Hanover, Pennsylvania
- Key people: Dylan Lissette (chairman); Howard Friedman (CEO)
- Products: Snack foods
- Revenue: US$1.439 billion (2025)
- Operating income: US$19.5 million (2025)
- Net income: −US$7.7 million (2025)
- Total assets: US$2.794 billion (2025)
- Number of employees: 3,300 (2025)
- Website: www.utzsnacks.com

Utz Brands, Inc. (/ˈʌts/), more commonly known as Utz, is an American snack food company based in Hanover, Pennsylvania. The company produces a variety of potato chips, pretzels, and other snacks, with most products sold under their family of brands. Utz is also a snack supplier to warehouse clubs and merchandisers.

== History ==
=== Early years ===
Utz Brands began in 1921 as Hanover Home Brand Potato Chips when William and Salie Utz began making potato chips out of their home in Hanover, Pennsylvania, with an initial investment of US $300 (equal to about $5,400 as of 2019). The hand-operated equipment used at the time produced approximately 50 pounds of potato chips per hour. Salie cooked chips and Bill delivered them to local grocery stores and farmers’ markets in the Hanover and Baltimore, Maryland, areas.

The couple relocated the company's operations to a concrete building in the family's backyard. In 1938, production was boosted with the purchase of an automatic fryer capable of producing 300 pounds of chips an hour.

=== Post-war years and expansion ===
In 1938, Francis Xavier Rice joined the company after marrying Arlene Utz. In 1949, post-war success allowed the company to build a new production facility on 10 acres (40,000 m^{2}) in Hanover. Salie and Bill died in 1965 and 1968, respectively, at which time Rice became president of the company.

The company purchased two more Hanover-based production facilities during the 1970s. Rice retired in 1978, and his son Michael became company president, while Arlene Utz Rice remained as the company's chairman of the board. Utz's largest production facility and its administrative headquarters was completed in 1983.

=== Modern era ===
During the late 1980s, sales of Utz pretzels grew by 20 percent annually; by 1991, pretzel sales composed almost 10 percent of total revenue. By the middle of the decade, annual sales of Utz products topped $100 million. At that time, the company had a workforce of one thousand employees.

A 2009 plan to merge Utz with rival Snyder's of Hanover was abandoned after an antitrust inquiry by the U.S. Federal Trade Commission.

In 2011, Utz Brands acquired Zappe Endeavors and its affiliated entities, which manufacture and market Zapp's, Dirty's, and California Chips brand potato chips. This acquisition included Zapp's plants in Louisiana, California, and Pennsylvania, thereby making Utz a national snack food manufacturer overnight. Management of Zappe remained in place after the acquisition.

In 2011, Utz acquired the Wachusett Potato Chip Company in Fitchburg, Massachusetts. In 2012, Utz Brands acquired The Bachman Company with Utz buying the intellectual property rights, distribution, and Ephrata manufacturing facility; however, the Bachman family continued to use its Reading and Hyde Park facilities under the name Savor Street Foods Inc. to make private label products and other goods for Utz. Utz Brands remained family-operated at that time, with Michael Rice as chairman and his son-in-law Dylan Lissette as chief executive officer.

In 2016, Utz Brands acquired snack food company Golden Flake. In December 2017, Utz acquired Phoenix-based Inventure Foods, Inc. which manufactured specialty food brands including Boulder Canyon Foods (founded in Boulder, Colorado, in 1994), TGI Fridays, and Vidalia.

In October 2019, Utz acquired rival snack food company Snyder of Berlin in Berlin, Pennsylvania (not to be confused with Snyder's of Hanover), from Pinnacle Foods. In August 2020, Utz became a publicly traded company after combining with Collier Creek Holdings. Utz announced in November 2020 that it would acquire Truco Enterprises, manufacturer of On the Border tortilla chips and dips, for $480 million. They announced in January 2021 that they would acquire Vitner's for $25 million. In May 2021, Utz acquired the supplier Fastida Foods for $41 million. In December 2021, Utz acquired R.W. Garcia for $56 million.

In January 2022, Utz acquired the distribution companies Clem Snacks and J&D Snacks. In February 2022, Utz bought a manufacturing plant from Evans Foods Group for $38.4 million. In April 2023, Utz Brands announced that the Golden Flakes factory in Birmingham, Alabama will cease operations around July 3, 2023.

On February 5, 2024, the Good Health and R.W. Garcia brands and related manufacturing assets were sold to Our Home affiliates for $167.5 million, subject to adjustments.

In July 2026, Utz Brands agreed to be acquired and taken private by German snack manufacturer Intersnack in a transaction valued at approximately US$2.9 billion. The acquisition closed on November 20, 2026, at $14.25 in cash per outstanding Class A share, and NYSE trading ceased. Entities affiliated with the founding Rice and Lissette families retained a 50% stake in Utz Brands Holdings after the transaction, with Intersnack holding the other 50%.

=== Sponsorship ===
Until the 2012 season, Utz was a sponsor of the New York Yankees and had been part of the right field of Yankee Stadium for many seasons. The company also sponsored the Philadelphia Phillies.

As of 2021 Utz sponsors the Baltimore Orioles and the Pittsburgh Pirates. Utz has also sponsored the Philadelphia Eagles for multiple seasons. In addition, Utz became the official vendor of all pre-packaged snacks for the Baltimore Ravens starting in 2014. Also, Utz sponsors the Connecticut Tigers and Erie SeaWolves, of Minor League Baseball.

In 2018, the company signed a multi-year sponsorship deal with Major League Baseball to become the league's "official salty snack." The following year, Utz became the presenting sponsor of the 2019 National League Division Series.

== Products ==
Utz manufactures a wide variety of potato chips and pretzels – 1,000,000 pounds (450,000 kg) of potato chips and 900,000 pounds (410,000 kg) of pretzels every week. Utz also produces cheese curls, sunflower chips, tortilla chips, popcorn, pork rinds, and party mix. Specialty items include chocolate-covered pretzels, seasonal pretzel barrels and sports mixes. Utz also carries dips, salsas, and crackers.

In total, Utz makes 395 different types and flavors of snacks.

Utz regular potato chips are cooked in cottonseed oil; its Kettle Classic line in peanut oil; and its Grandma Utz varieties in lard. Additionally, Utz produces an organic product line, which includes products certified organic by Quality Assurance International, as well as a "natural" product line that includes potato chips cooked in sunflower oil. The company incorporates the "Snacking Smart" icon on a number of its products, indicating a healthier snacking choice to the consumer.

== Mail order and online store ==
During the mid-1980s, Utz started a catalog mail order service allowing consumers to order Utz products by phone for home delivery. In 1998, Utz added online ordering at their website utzsnacks.com.

== Little Utz Girl mascot and logo ==
The official mascot of Utz Brands is the Little Utz Girl, or more commonly known as the Utz Girl. She has appeared on Utz snack food packages and/or in the company logo since the 1920s. During the early years, she was drawn from a realistic perspective as a young, dark-haired girl with a bow, bob hairstyle, and blushing cheeks, and shown reaching into a bag of potato chips.

In 1961, the Little Utz Girl was redesigned by the Baltimore advertising agency Torrieri-Myers Advertising. At that time the icon's head became a circle and was inspired by the National Bohemian Beer logo that today is known as "The Natty Bo Guy." Later iterations of the Utz logo portrayed the "U" in the Utz wordmark doubling as the potato chip bag she reached into. Designers also altered the color of the logo to match the flavor of potato chips or variety of snacks it represented, with the Utz Girl's hair being one color and her bow, blush, and shirt being another color.

== In popular culture ==
Utz potato chips were featured in season two of Mad Men when the character comedian Jimmy Barrett was hired as a spokesperson for a fictional marketing campaign.

Utz products, especially potato chips, were featured in the background scenery of many episodes of the American TV show The Office, set in the US city of Scranton, Pennsylvania.

The Little Utz Girl makes a cameo appearance as one of the customers in a KFC restaurant in the 2009 animated short film Logorama.

== See also ==
- List of food companies
