= Zapp's =

Potato chip brand

- Type: Subsidiary
- Industry: Food
- Founded: 1985
- Founder: Ron Zappe
- Headquarters: Gramercy, Louisiana, U.S.
- Parent: Utz Quality Foods
- Website: www.zapps.com

Zapp's is a brand of potato chip made in the United States. The chips are kettle-cooked in peanut oil (instead of vegetable oil, which many other companies use), except for the Bourbon St. Smokey Sweet flavor which are 'thin & crispy'. Zapp's market themselves with their Cajun heritage, using names such as "Spicy Cajun Crawtator", "Sour Cream and Creole Onion" and "Cajun Dill Gator-tators". Others, in addition to the "Regular Flavored" include "Hotter 'N Hot Jalapeño", "Mesquite BBQ" and "Voodoo" chip flavors. They have also marketed numerous chips such as a limited edition Mardi Gras chip.

== History ==
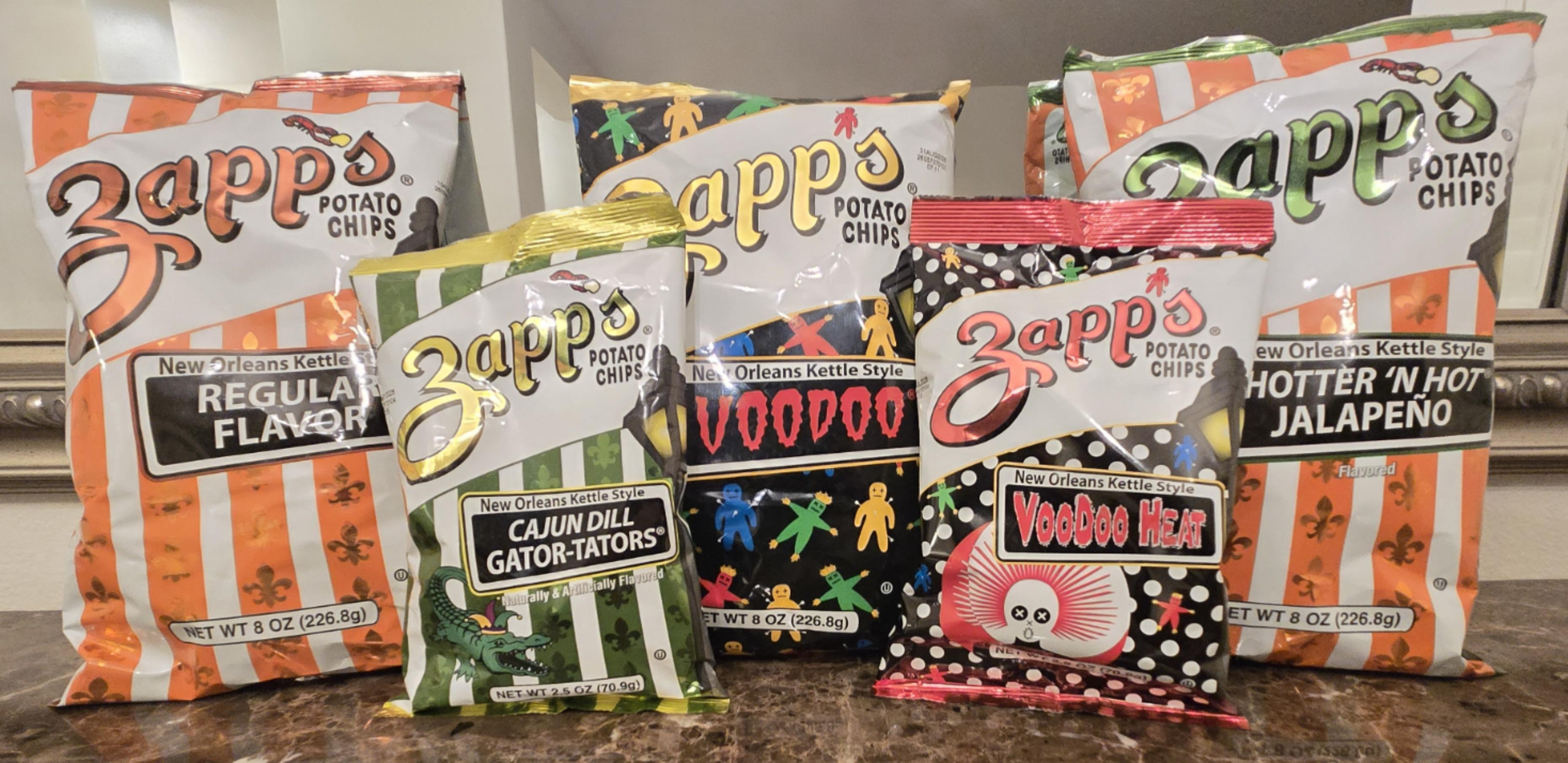
Zapp's Potato Chips brands

=== Founding ===
The company was founded by Ron Zappe, who graduated from Texas A&M University with a degree in industrial engineering and became a distributor of pumps and other oil-field equipment. His four companies went bankrupt during the 1980s oil bust; he moved from Houston to Louisiana and started a potato chip business. (Zappe later received national attention for his 1988 campaign appearance on behalf of Republican vice presidential candidate Dan Quayle, crediting a jobs program co-created by Quayle with enabling him to start his factory in Gramercy.) Zappe's first creation, the Cajun Crawtator, was introduced in 1985 as the nation's first spicy Cajun chip. Zapp's "Tiger Tators" were the first food product licensed by Louisiana State University, and it also sold "Who Dat?" chips in honor of the New Orleans Saints. Zapp's most popular flavor is "Voodoo" which was created in 2008 by Kevin Holden, General Manager and a shareholder of the company. In 1993 Zapp's acquired the Dirty Chip Company in Memphis, Tennessee, which manufactures Dirty Chips brand kettle chips. In 2006 Zapp's acquired the California Chip Company in Oxnard, California, which manufactures California Chips brand potato chips. Zappe appeared on The Oprah Winfrey Show in 1997, and the chips were profiled in national publications such as People and The Wall Street Journal.

=== Death of founder, sale to Utz Quality Foods ===
Zappe died in Houston, Texas on June 1, 2010, at the age of 67. In January 2011, it was reported that the company would be sold to Utz Quality Foods of Hanover, Pennsylvania. The sale to Utz was completed in April 2011. Zapp's operates as a wholly owned subsidiary and no longer manufactures at the Gramercy, Louisiana, plant.
