= Wachusett Mountain State Reservation =

Protected area in Massachusetts

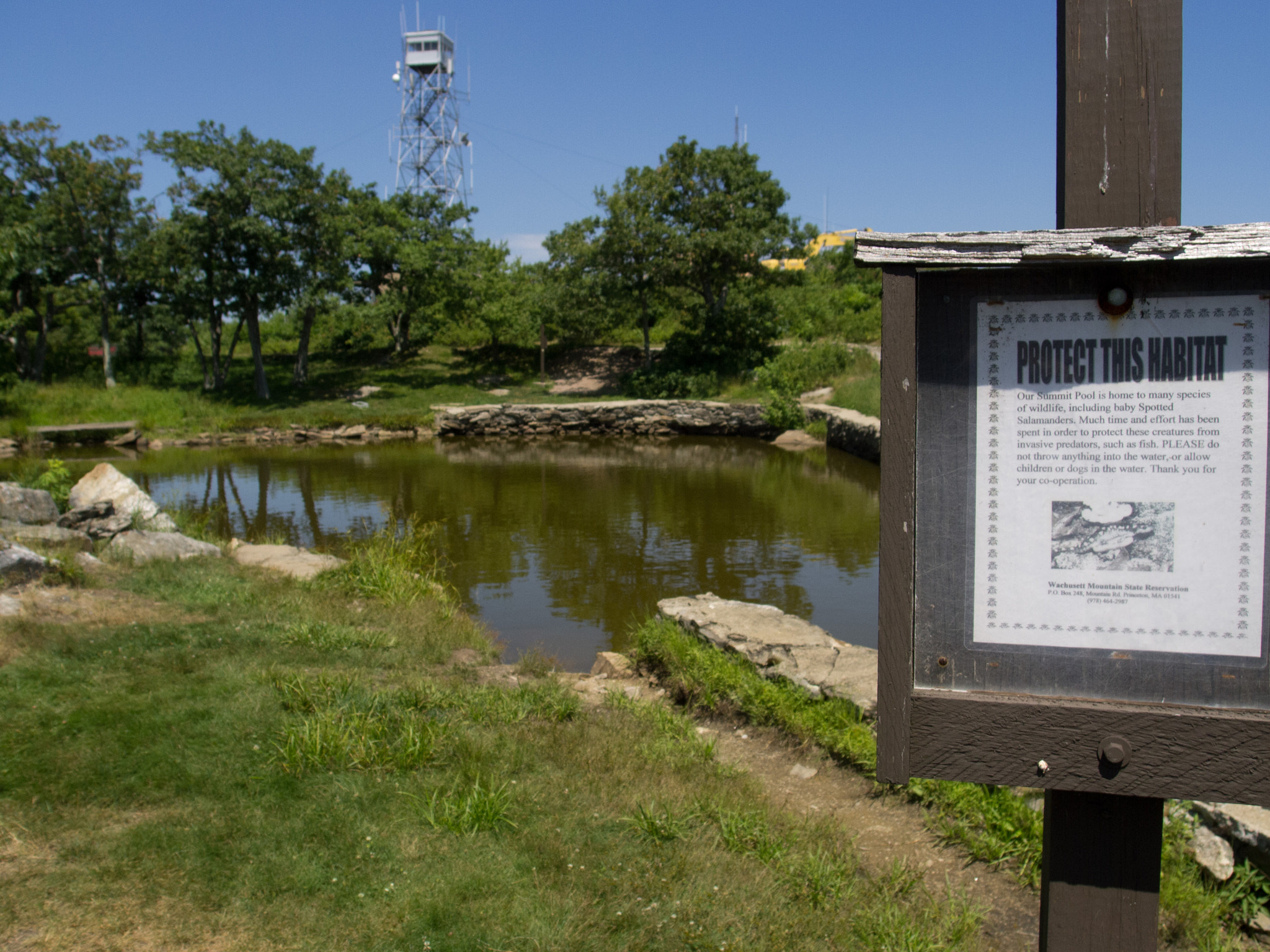
- Summit Pool

- Location within Massachusetts Location within the United States
- Location: Princeton and Westminster, Massachusetts, United States
- Coordinates: 42°29′21″N 71°53′12″W
- Area: 3,000 acres (1,200 ha)
- Elevation: 2,001 ft (610 m)
- Administrator: Massachusetts Department of Conservation and Recreation
- Website: Official website

Wachusett Mountain State Reservation is a protected area encompassing 3,000 acres (1,200 ha) around the summit of Mount Wachusett in Massachusetts. Views from the top of Mount Wachusett include Mount Monadnock to the north, Mount Greylock to the west, southern Vermont to the northwest and Boston to the east.

== Activities and amenities ==
A seasonal automobile road ascends to the summit of Wachusett Mountain. The reservation's 17 miles (27 km) of hiking and walking trails include a section of the Midstate Trail. The section of the Midstate Trail traversing the summit of the mountain is one of the only remaining old-growth forests in Massachusetts. The privately operated Wachusett Mountain Ski Area occupies a 450-acre (180 ha) lease parcel on the northern slopes of the mountain.
