= Letters and Notes on the Manners, Customs, and Conditions of the North American Indians =

1842 travel narrative by George Catlin

Letters and Notes on the Manners, Customs, and Conditions of the North American Indians is a two-volume travel narrative by George Catlin, an American painter, author, and traveler. The book, published in 1842 in London, was written during eight years of travel from 1832 to 1839 and contains many of Catlin’s illustrations. The book is divided into letters written by Catlin, rather than chapters, with some letters containing information about the same regions.

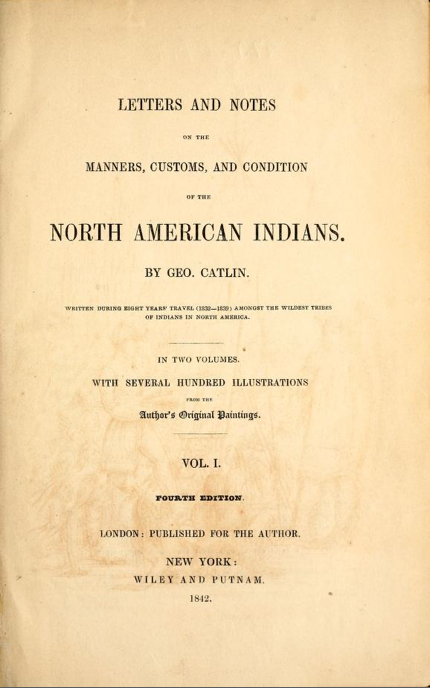
Title Page of Volume 1 of Letters and Notes on the Manners, Customs, and Conditions of the North American Indians by George Catlin

== Summary ==
=== Volume 1 ===
Volume 1 is 264 pages and contains 31 letters. The first letter serves as an introduction to Catlin’s life, setting up the writings on his travels. He then travels to the mouth of the Yellowstone River and then to a Mandan village. He writes several letters about the Mandan village before writing about his travels to a Minataree village. The final letters of the first volume describe the mouth of the Teton River.

==== Letter 1: Introduction ====
This first letter is written to serve as an introduction and is actually written after the others to give the reader background information. In it, Catlin tells the reader he was born in Wyoming, Pennsylvania to parents that moved to the area shortly after the Revolutionary War and the "Indian Massacre." He followed in his father's footsteps and became a lawyer, but eventually gave that up to become an artist in Philadelphia. He starts for the west in 1832, and tells of what he hopes his book will do, saying "I send forth these volumes at this time, fresh and full of their living deeds and customs, as a familiar and unstudied introduction (at least) to them and their native character; which I confidently hope will repay the readers who read for information and historical facts, as well as those who read but for amusement." In this letter, he also tells the reader the proper way to approach Indians and his thoughts on their probable eventual extinction based on the history of the number of people in the tribes.

==== Letters 2–9: Mouth of the Yellow Stone ====
In these letters he takes note of the beauty of the area, and also learns about buffalo hunting. He makes multiple illustrations of the animal itself, along with a piece that illustrates the actual act of hunting and killing the buffalo. He also learns about the Blackfoot nation (letter 5), even painting the head chief. The line cut can be seen at the very end of letter 4. In the narrative, he mentions their costumes, dynamics between Blackfeet, their weapons (lances, bows, shields, and arrows), and mentions several distinguished Blackfeet. In letter 6, he mainly writes of medicine used in the tribes of the region, learning the nature of medicine bags, how to form them, and of their value. During the time of these letters, he also meets and learns about the Crow and their lifestyle, comparing their language with the Blackfeet.

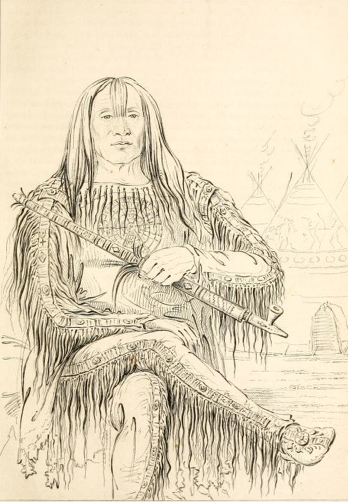
George Catlin's portrait of the head chief of the Blackfoot Nation

==== Letters 10–22; 25: Mandan Village ====
These letters start with Catlin's journey to the Mandan, noting what he sees, such as the beautiful flowers and animals such as mountain sheep and grizzly bears, as well as what happens, such as his canoe being robbed and what he calls a "courageous attack." After arriving in the village, he writes about the history and formation of the Mandan's locations. Based on the number of letters dedicated to the Mandan and their village, he learns all he can about the people and customs of this region, including:

- Constructing their wigwams along with description of interior
- Weapons
- Jokes
- Story-telling
- The "Big Canoe"
- Medicine Lodge
- The Dead
  - Respect of the dead
  - Visiting the dead
  - Feeding the dead
  - Converse with the dead
  - Bones of the dead
- The Wolf Chief
- The Head Chief
- Personal Appearances
- Hair of the men and women
- Bathing and Swimming
- Costumes and Headdresses
- Polygamy
- Marriage
- Medicine
- Dancing
  - Buffalo Dance
- Feasting
- Fasting
- Horses
- Ceremonies

He also writes about the Mandan people's reactions to his painting. They are intrigued by his art, but also have superstitious fears about it.

==== Letters 23-24: Minataree Village ====
Catlin learns about the origin and history of the Minataree villages and their old chief, Black Moccasin. He learns about the buffalo that surround the village, and writes on how the tribe cuts and transports the meat they hunt.

==== Letters 26–31:Mouth of Teton River ====
Catlin notices the Sioux are also both interested and apprehensive about his painting, saying that the women are particularly difficult to paint portraits of. He notes some Sioux chiefs (Ha-wan-je-tah and Shoo-de-ga-cha and wife) and writes about Sioux early marriages. Some more aspects of Sioux life he learns about include:

- Indian vanity
- Buffalo
  - Hunting
  - Amount killed (1400)
- Dance
  - Bear dance
  - Beggars dance
  - Scalp dance

== Reviews ==
=== American Indian Quarterly by Robert W. Richmond ===
This review was prompted by a new edition of the narrative that included an introduction by Marjorie Halpin. He notes the upgrade of photographic reproductions of Catlin's artwork instead of the line cuts in previous editions. Richmond praises Catlin's work, saying he "deserves admiration" for his accurate and non-romanticized accounts and artwork. He also thinks that even though Catlin's art will never be seen as masterpieces, it is nonetheless fantastic in its detail.

=== The Western Historical Quarterly by James T. Forrest ===
This review mainly looks at Michael Mooney's edited version of the book. Forrest admits that some might be put off at first by Mooney's edits, saying that some may feel that something is missing or that language was changed to seem more contemporary. Overall, Forrest commends Mooney's efforts, noting his obvious devotion. The review ends by stating that, "This volume helps us to appreciate the significance of the cause and the varied achievements of a remarkable man who accepted his own challenge."

== Works cited ==
- Catlin, George (1842). Letters and Notes on the Customs and Manners of the North American Indians. Vol. 1 (4th ed.). New York: Wiley and Putnam. OCLC 2127425.
