= Wachusett Brewing Company =

American brewing company

- Industry: Microbrewery
- Founded: 1994
- Founder: Ned LaFortune, Peter Quinn, and Kevin Buckler
- Headquarters: Westminster, Massachusetts, USA
- Products: Beer
- Website: wachusettbrewingcompany.com

Wachusett Brewing Company is a microbrewery and craft brewery in Westminster, Massachusetts. It is the first brewery in Worcester County..

== History ==
Wachusett Brewing Company was founded in 1994 by Ned LaFortune, Peter Quinn, and Kevin Buckler, who met while attending Worcester Polytechnic Institute. In 1995, the company's largest account was the Wachusett Mountain Ski Area.

On February 26, 2015, the company opened a new brewhouse to allow them to produce four times more beer.
