= Le Rhin =

1842 travel guide by Victor Hugo

- Author: Victor Hugo
- Language: French
- Subject: Rhine, travel, history, sagas and legends
- Genre: Travel guide, political essay
- Publication date: 1842
- Publication place: France
- Media type: Print

Le Rhin (French pronunciation: [lə ʁɛ̃], lit. The Rhine) is an 1842 travel guide written by Victor Hugo. Subtitled lettres à un ami (letters to a friend), it takes the form of letters describing the sights and landmarks of a journey along the Rhine and relating local legends. It concludes with a long political essay depicting a new European order, united by a Franco-German alliance.

The book was based on journeys Hugo took in 1838, 1839, and 1840, and the letters he wrote during those journeys. He edited and expanded the letters for publication, drawing on works of history, travel guides, and sagas and legends, and added the long conclusion.

The first edition contains twenty-five letters covering the journey through Champagne and Belgium to Aachen, and from Cologne to Mainz, as well as the conclusion. The second edition contains a further fourteen letters covering the journey from Frankfurt to Lausanne.
