= Wachusett Potato Chip Company =

U.S. snack food company

Coordinates: 42°34′5.6″N 71°47′5.2″W

Wachusett Potato Chip Company in Fitchburg, Massachusetts, was founded in 1937, by Polish-American brothers Theofil and Stephen "Sam" Krysiak. The company takes its name from nearby Mount Wachusett.

The company was originally founded in Clinton, Massachusetts, and moved to Fitchburg in 1947 when it purchased a decommissioned Fitchburg County jail building and grounds. The company converted the property and it has served as a manufacturing and distribution facility for snack products since that time. The company made several additions and renovations over time to accommodate manufacturing and storage needs. It completed its last large scale renovation in the 1980s which included the addition of air conditioning to the manufacturing facility. It additionally acquired distribution storage in Sterling, Massachusetts.

Wachusett Potato Chip Company produced a large variety of potato chips flavors over the years including sour cream and onion, ketchup, salt and vinegar, no salt-added, barbecue, honey barbecue, and ripple chips. Flavors that developed wide appeal continue to be produced. Until its sale to Utz, it also distributed under its own label cheese curls and pop corn.

The chips are sold at stores including Wal-Mart, Hannaford, Stop and Shop, Price Chopper, and local restaurants and delis.

Another large portion of Wachusett's production was dedicated to private label potato chips for supermarkets such as Price Chopper Supermarkets and as well for food service providers such as Sysco.

On October 19, 2011, Wachusett was sold to Hanover, Pennsylvania–based Utz Quality Foods, Inc. Utz paid $1.7 million for Wachusett's 56,000 square-foot facility. Utz announced that Wachusett's 50 employees would be kept on, including members of the Krysiak family. The company operated as a subsidiary of Utz.

At the time of the 2011 sale, Wachusett was the last remaining independent potato chip company in New England, which at its peak had 14 producers. Then-President Edward Krysiak, who took over the business following the death of his father in 1960, continuously modernized the business and facilities over his 51 years as its leader, and was committed to finding a buyer who would keep the business in Fitchburg. Ed Krysiak died in 2022.

In April 2024 Utz sold the Wachusett factory facility to Our Home, the New Jersey-based manufacturer of snacks including Popchips.

"The transaction, which includes the Fitchburg facility and another Utz factory in Berlin, Pennsylvania, is valued at $18.5 million… Under the deal, Our Home will continue to manufacture Utz-brand products for a period of time under a co-manufacturing agreement.

The move will not impact the Wachusett brand, said Kevin Brick, vice president of regulatory and community affairs for Utz.

‘There are no changes to our brands as part of this announcement, including the Wachusett brand, a long-time local favorite,’ Brick said in an email to WBJ."
