= Mount Wachusett =

Mountain in Massachusetts, United States

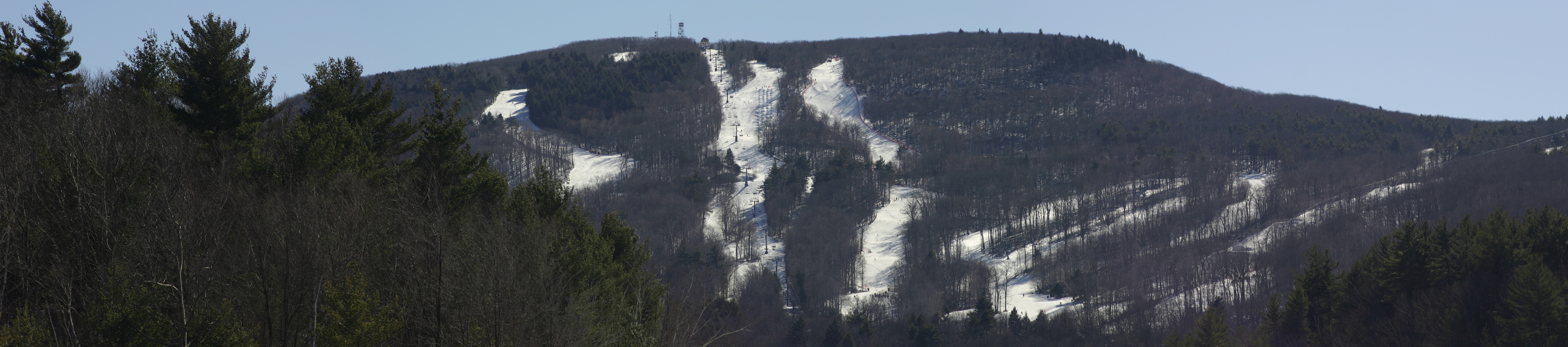
- Mount Wachusett in winter

Highest point
- Elevation: 2,006 ft (611 m)
- Prominence: 922 ft (281 m)
- Coordinates: 42°29′20″N 71°53′15″W

Naming
- English translation: "Near the mountain", "Mountain place"
- Language of name: Natick Indian

Geography
- Location within Massachusetts Location within the United States
- Country: United States
- State: Massachusetts
- County: Worcester County
- Towns: Princeton; Westminster

Geology
- Rock age: 250 million years
- Mountain type(s): Metamorphic rock; monadnock

Climbing
- Easiest route: Auto road, ski lift, or Pine Hill trail.

Mount Wachusett is a mountain in Massachusetts. It straddles towns of Princeton and Westminster, in Worcester County. It is the highest point in Massachusetts east of the Connecticut River. The mountain is named after a Native American term meaning "near the mountain" or "mountain place". The mountain is a popular hiking and skiing destination (see 'Wachusett Mountain Ski Area"). An automobile road, open spring to fall, ascends to the summit. Views from the top of Mount Wachusett include Mount Monadnock to the north, Mount Greylock to the west, southern Vermont to the northwest, and Boston to the east. The mountain is traversed by the 92 mi (148 km) Midstate Trail. It is also home to the Wachusett Mountain State Reservation.

A band of old-growth forest along rock ledges 500 feet (150 m) below the summit supports trees from 150 to 370 years old. Covering 220 acres (89 ha), it is the largest known old growth forest east of the Connecticut River in Massachusetts.

== Geography ==
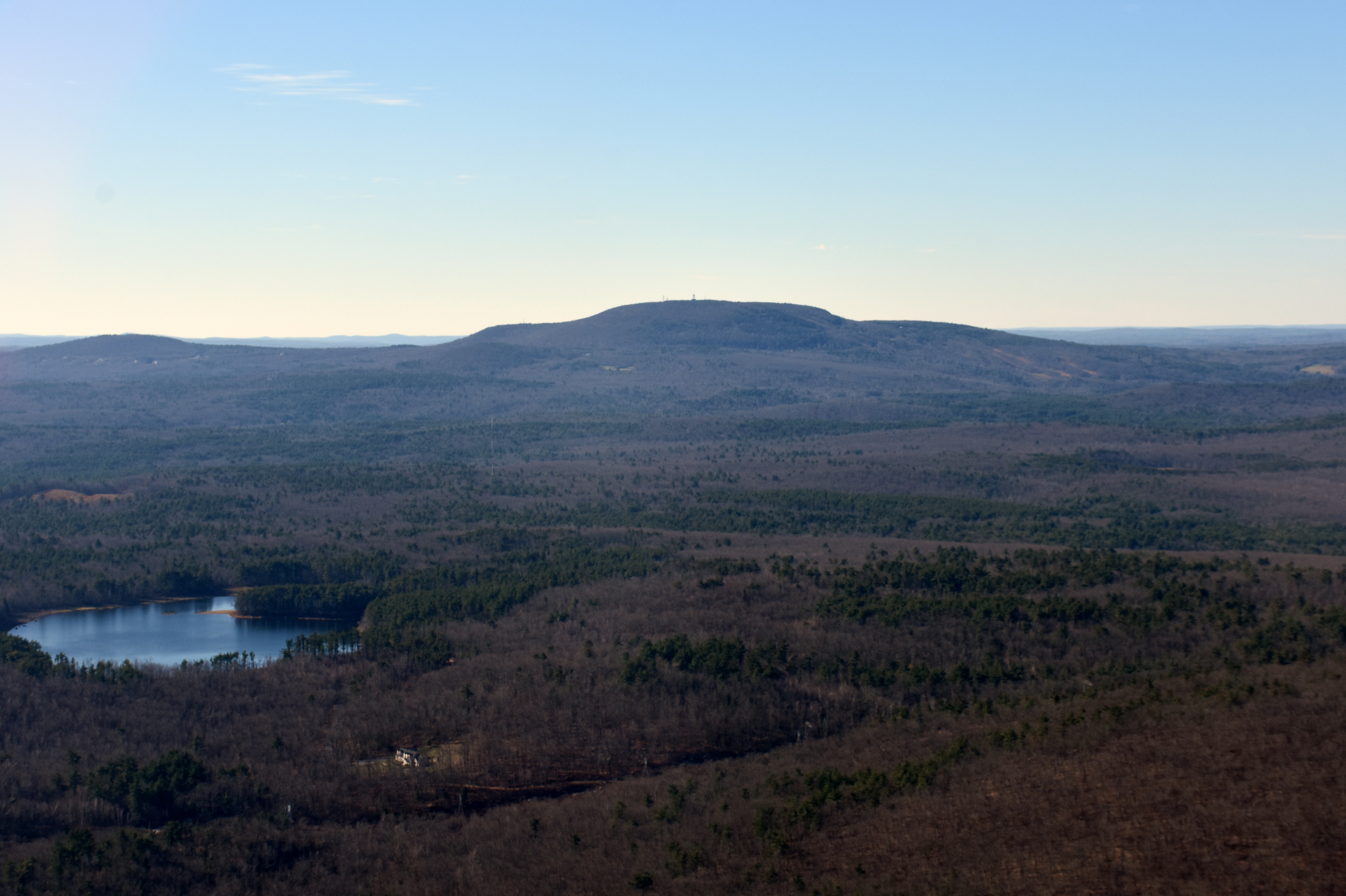
Mount Wachusett and flat environs

Mount Wachusett is a (formerly) glaciated monadnock: a single mountain on a relatively flat landscape. Glacial activity that shaped the mountain can be seen at Balance Rock on the northeast side of the mountain: two large boulders were stacked one on top of each other by moving glaciers thousands of years ago.

Mount Wachusett is bordered to the south by Little Wachusett Mountain and Brown Hill, to the north by Church Rock, to the east by Pine Hill, and to the northeast by the Crow Hills. The nearest mountain of comparable size is Mount Watatic, 1,832 feet (558 m), 12 mi (19 km) to the north on the New Hampshire border in Ashburnham, Massachusetts.

The west side of Mount Wachusett drains into the east branch of the Ware River, thence into the Chicopee River, the Connecticut River, and Long Island Sound. The south side drains into the Quinapoxet River, the Nashua River, thence the Merrimack River and the Atlantic Ocean. The east side drains into the Stillwater River, thence the Nashua River. The north side drains into the Nashua River through a series of small reservoirs.

== Ski area and recreation ==
Mount Wachusett is home to a 25-trail ski area serviced by 3 high-speed quads, 1 fixed-grip triple and 3 carpet lifts. It features approximately 1,000 feet (300 m) of vertical, a 50,000-square-foot (4,600 m^{2}) base lodge, 100% snowmaking and night skiing on 18 trails. The mountain also maintains a terrain park and a jump called the Main Event. Due to its location, it is a popular skiing destination for residents of nearby Worcester and Boston. The ski area is located within the boundaries of the Wachusett Mountain State Reservation on a 450-acre (1.8 km^{2}) lease parcel on the northern slopes of the mountain.

There is an annual 6.2 mile (10 km) road race each May sponsored by the Central Mass Striders.

Stands of old-growth hardwood forest on Mount Wachusett became the object of a 2003 court ruling in favor of the Commonwealth of Massachusetts in joint contract with the ski area regarding plans for a ski slope expansion into an environmental buffer zone around the old growth stand. The old growth forest contains trees over 350 years old; the buffer zone contained mature trees about half that age. The Sierra Club and other conservation organizations criticized the ruling and two members of Earth First! staged a sit-in protest by climbing into the crowns of several of the trees in the area slated to be clear cut. As of 2007 wording on the website of the Wachusett Mountain Ski Area included strong language prohibiting skiers and snow boarders from entering the old growth area: "Anyone found entering old growth areas will have their lift ticket revoked. Subsequent offenses will be subject to fines."

== History ==
Before European colonialism, Wachusett was the home of the Nipmuc tribe. The tribe has been confined to a four-and-a-half acre reservation outside Grafton, Massachusetts, which began as a praying town in 1654. The general feeling towards the ski resort among Nipmucs is that it is an injustice. Some hope to someday use the mountain as a proper Nipmuc cultural center. During King Philip's War in 1676, Native Americans brought their captive, Mary Rowlandson, to Wachusett to release her to the colonists at Redemption Rock.

== See also ==
The name Wachusett has been adopted for the names of institutions, businesses, structures, geographic features, and other miscellaneous uses:

- Wachusett Reservoir
- Wachusett Mountain State Reservation
- Wachusett Brewing Company
- Wachusett (MBTA station)
- Mount Wachusett Community College
- Wachusett Regional High School
- USS Wachusett
- Wachusett Road in the Town of Woodway, Washington
- Wachusett Potato Chips Company

It is also the title of Henry David Thoreau's A Walk to Wachusett, which describes the transcendentalist author's experiences during his four-day walk from Concord to the mountain and back.
