= Katharine Augusta Ware =

American poet and editor (1797–1843)

Katharine Augusta Ware (1797–1843) was a 19th-century American poet and the editor of the Boston-based literary periodical, Bower of Taste. A selection from her writings, under the title of The Power of the Passions and other Poems, was published in London in 1842.

== Biography ==
Katharine (sometimes misspelled "Katherine") Augusta Ware was born in 1797 at Quincy, Massachusetts, where her father was a physician. She was remarkable in childhood for a love of reading. She wrote verses at a very early age. Her talent was evident when, at the age of fifteen, she penned a poignant poem commemorating the death of Robert Treat Paine, a work that earned her a place in the collection of Paine's works.

In 1819, she married Charles A. Ware, an officer of the United States Navy. in the ensuing years, she gained recognition as an accomplished writer of odes for public events and contributed to literary journals. Among her odes was one addressed to Lafayette and presented to him in the ceremony of his reception in Boston, by her eldest child, then five years old; and another, in honor of New York Governor DeWitt Clinton, which was recited at the Erie Canal celebration in New York.

In 1828, Ware commenced in Boston the publication of a literary periodical, entitled The Bower of Taste, which was continued several years. Later, she relocated to New York City. In 1839, she went to Europe, where she remained until her death, in Paris in 1843.

A few months before she died, Ware published, in London, a selection from her writings, under the title of The Power of the Passions and other Poems.

== Selected works ==
- The Power of the Passions and other Poems, 1842 (text)
