= The Transcendentalist =

1842 lecture and essay by Ralph Waldo Emerson

The Transcendentalist is a lecture and essay by American writer and thinker Ralph Waldo Emerson. It is one of the essays he wrote while establishing the doctrine of American Transcendentalism. The lecture was read at the Masonic Temple in Boston, Massachusetts in January 1842.

The work begins by contrasting materialists and idealists. Emerson laments the absence of "old idealists." He goes on to outline the fundamental beliefs and characteristics of the New England Transcendentalists. He discusses the nature of epistemology and the debate between Locke and Kant on Imperative forms and Transcendental forms, and discusses perception and reality in a blatantly Platonic sense. He says that solitude is a state of being that should be encouraged, for it allows humanity to achieve a higher level of alignment with nature and prevents the contamination that one encounters within a society.

Henry David Thoreau embodied the majority of these characteristics, except for neglecting to take action against the government. Thoreau was a staunch abolitionist; his home was a stop on the Underground Railroad. He was actively subverting the government, but Emerson admitted that there was no perfect Transcendentalist. Emerson created a perfect, ideal archetype for the Transcendentalist, but also realized that it would be adapted to fit imperfect humans in an imperfect world.

== See also ==
- Transcendentalism
- Compensation (essay)
