= The Power of the Passions and other Poems =

The Power of the Passions and other Poems was a 19th-century poetry collection written by Katharine Augusta Ware, and published in New York City and London.

A few months before she died, Ware published, in London, a selection from her writings, under the title of The Power of the Passions and other Poems. The composition from which the volume has its principal title was originally printed in The Knickerbocker, for April in the same year. In his The Female Poets of America, Griswold remarks that this, though the longest, is scarcely the best of her productions, but it has passages of consider able strength and boldness, and some felicities of expression. She describes a public dancer, as:

Moving as if her element were air,
And music was the echo of her step;

and there are many other lines noticeable for a picturesque beauty or a fine cadence. In other poems, also, are parts which are much superior to their contexts, as if written in moments of inspiration, and added to in laborious leisure: as the following, from The Diamond Island, which refers to a beautiful place in Lake George:

How sweet to stray along thy flowery shore,
Where crystals sparkle in the sunny ray;
While the red boatman plies his silvery oar
To the wild measure of some rustic lay!

and these lines, from an allusion to Athens:

Views the broad stadium where the gymnic art
Nerved the young arm and energized the heart.

or this apostrophe to sculpture, from "Musings in St. James's Cemetery":

Sculpture, oh, what a triumph o'er the grave
Hath thy proud art! thy powerful hand can save
From the destroyer's grasp the noble form,
As if the spirit dwelt, still thrilling, warm,
In every line and feature of the face,
The air majestic, and the simple grace
Of flowing robes, which shade, but not conceal,
All that the classic chisel would reveal.

These inequalities are characteristic of the larger number of Ware's poems, but there are in her works some pieces marked by a sustained elegance, and deserving of praise for their fancy and feeling as well as for an artist-like finish.
