= The Peace Maker (pamphlet) =

1842 pamphlet by Udney Hay Jacob

- Cover page of The Peace Maker in the collection of the Harold B. Lee Library
- Author: Udney Hay Jacob
- Language: English
- Publisher: Joseph Smith
- Publication date: October 29, 1842
- Publication place: United States
- Media type: Pamphlet
- Pages: 38

The Peace Maker is a thirty-six page pamphlet written by Udney Hay Jacob and published in Nauvoo on October 29, 1842 which rejected the growing rights of women on Biblical grounds. Jacob claimed female power was growing, it was dangerous, and the way to curtail it was through polygamy and granting men the sole power of divorce. The pamphlet was adapted from a longer Biblical treatise that Jacob had presented to President Martin Van Buren in 1840.

The original two-chapter pamphlet The Peace Maker was published in Nauvoo, Illinois, with Joseph Smith, the founder of the Latter Day Saint movement, listed as the printer. The pamphlet caused an uproar within Nauvoo, and was published the same month as an expose published by recently excommunicated John C. Bennett. On December 1st, Smith printed a denial of any connection to the work, and stated that it had been published without his knowledge. Historians continue to debate Smith's involvement and the possibility that some aspects of the pamphlet may have represented Smith's thought.

== Summary ==
The Peace Maker deals in substantial part with Biblical marriage laws, primarily divorce. Jacob argues that just as property can not put away its owner, women should not be able to instigate divorce. Furthermore, the only legitimate reason for divorce should be the refusal of a wife to submit to and revere her husband's authority. The pamphlet advocates for polygamy as a way to undermine any sexual power a wife may use over her husband.

The pamphlet ends with "the question is not now to be debated whether these things are so; neither is it a question of much importance who wrote this book? But the question, the momentous question is: will you now restore the law of God on this important subject, and keep it?"

== Authorship ==
Jacob was not a member of the Church of Jesus Christ of Latter Day Saints when The Peace Maker was published. However, Jacob and his family had lived among the Latter Day Saints in Chautauqua County, New York, in the early 1830s and in the Latter Day Saint region of Hancock County, Illinois throughout the period of settlement there. Additionally, Jacob was baptized into the church in 1843, the year after his pamphlet appeared.

== Reaction ==
Smith denounced the pamphlet in the December 1, 1842, issue of Times and Seasons, the official church newspaper, writing:

There was a book printed at my office, a short time since, written by Udney H. Jacob, on marriage, without my knowledge; and had I been apprised of it, I should not have printed it; not that I am opposed to any man enjoying his privileges; but I do not wish to have my name associated with the authors, in such an unmeaning rigmarole of nonsence [sic], folly, and trash. JOSEPH SMITH.

However, other sources raise the possibility that this statement may have been misleading. In particular, John D. Lee's 1877 "Confessions" states, speaking about the 1842–43 period:

During the winter Joseph, the Prophet, set a man by the name of Udney Hay Jacob to select from the Old Bible scriptures as pertained to polygamy, or celestial marriage, to write it in pamphlet form, and to advocate that doctrine. This he did as a feeler among the people, to pave the way for celestial marriage.

Laurel Thatcher Ulrich notes that while both Jacob and Smith used Biblical arguments to justify polygamy (which Smith secretly practiced at the time), the beliefs about divorce espoused in The Peace Maker do not match Joseph Smith's teachings or practices on divorce.

John Taylor, who helped manage the press that published The Peace Maker, also dismissed the pamphlet and felt William Smith was responsible for continuing its dissemination.

The text offers several defenses of polygamy that were later used extensively by the Church of Jesus Christ of Latter-day Saints (LDS Church), the Latter Day Saint sect which later migrated to Utah and defended the practice, arguing that polygamy produces greater marital unity than monogamy. The pamphlet also argues vigorously that male authority over females should be absolute and is of divine origin. The text has been influential in the development of 20th- and 21st-century Latter Day Saint polygamous movements.
