= USS Calypso (SP-632) =

Patrol vessel of the United States Navy

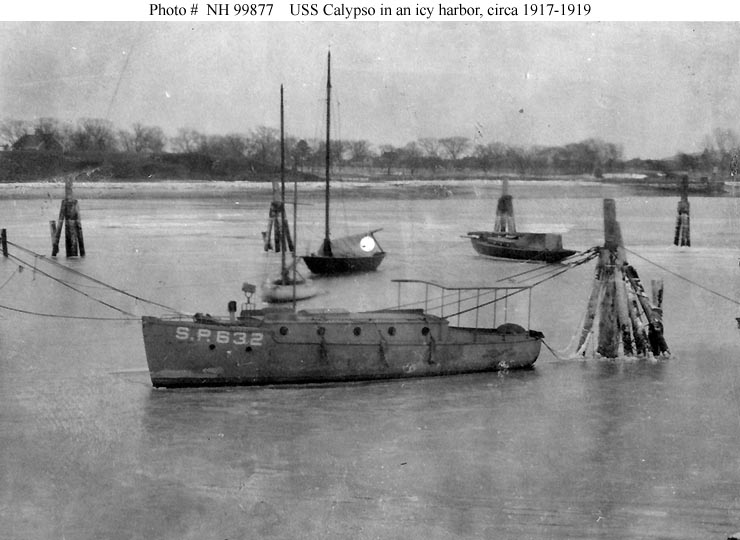
- USS Calypso (SP-632) tied up in an icy harbor sometime between 1917 and 1919.

History

United States
- Name: Calypso
- Namesake: Calypso, in Greek mythology, a nymph who lived on the island of Ogygia, where, according to the Odyssey, she detained Odysseus for seven years
- Owner: A. L. Mason, Westfield, New Jersey (1917)
- Builder: New York Yacht, Launch & Engine Company, Morris Heights, Bronx, New York
- Completed: 1909
- Fate: Sold to U.S. Navy June 1917

United States Navy
- Name: USS Calypso
- Namesake: Previous name retained
- Acquired: June 1917
- Commissioned: July 1917
- Fate: Transferred to U.S. Bureau of Fisheries 9 September 1919

U.S. Bureau of Fisheries
- Name: USFS Merganser
- Namesake: Merganser, a fish-eating duck of the genus Mergus in the subfamily Anatinae
- Acquired: 9 September 1919
- Identification: WTFD
- Fate: Transferred to Fish and Wildlife Service 30 June 1940

U.S. Fish and Wildlife Service
- Name: US FWS Merganser
- Namesake: Previous name retained
- Acquired: 30 June 1940
- Decommissioned: 1942 or 1943

General characteristics (as private motorboat)
- Type: Motorboat
- Length: 45 ft (13.7 m)
- Propulsion: 20 hp (15 kW) Alco gasoline engine

General characteristics (as U.S. Navy patrol boat)
- Type: Patrol vessel
- Length: 54 ft (16.5 m)
- Propulsion: 20 hp (15 kW) Alco gasoline engine

General characteristics (as BOF patrol boat)
- Type: Fishery patrol vessel
- Tonnage: 16 GRT; 13 NRT
- Length: 54 ft (16.5 m)
- Beam: 10 ft 6 in (3.2 m)
- Draft: 3 ft 8 in (1.1 m)
- Propulsion: 1919: 20 hp (15 kW) Alco gasoline engine, 100 US gallons (380 L; 83 imp gal) fuel; 1922: 16 hp (12 kW) engine
- Speed: 9 mph (14 km/h)

The second USS Calypso (SP-632) was a United States Navy patrol vessel in commission from 1917 to 1919. She originally operated as the private motorboat Calypso from 1909 to 1917. After the conclusion of her U.S. Navy career, she served as the fishery patrol vessel in the United States Bureau of Fisheries fleet from 1919 to 1940 as USFS Merganser and in the Fish and Wildlife Service fleet as US FWS Merganser from 1940 to 1942.

== Construction ==
Calypso was built as a private motorboat of the same name by the New York Yacht, Launch & Engine Company at Morris Heights in the Bronx, New York, in 1909. She operated as a pleasure craft.

== U.S. Navy service ==
In June 1917, the U.S. Navy purchased Calypso from her owner, A. L. Mason of Westfield, New Jersey, for use as a section patrol boat during World War I. After the Navy modified her into a motor launch, she was commissioned as USS Calypso (SP-632) in July 1917. She performed patrol duty along the coast of the northeastern United States for the rest of World War I.

World War I ended on 11 November 1918, and sometime thereafter the Navy decommissioned Calypso. Under an executive order dated 24 May 1919 addressing the disposition of vessels the Navy no longer required, Calypso was among several vessels designated for transfer to the United States Bureau of Fisheries (BOF). The Navy duly transferred her to the BOF on 9 September 1919.

== U.S. Bureau of Fisheries service ==
Prior to Calypso's official transfer, the Bureau of Fisheries took possession of her at Quincy, Massachusetts, in July 1919 and renamed her USFS Merganser. The BOF vessel USFS Phalarope towed Merganser and another former U.S. Navy patrol boat, the BOF vessel USFS Petrel, from Quincy to the Norfolk Navy Yard in Portsmouth, Virginia. There Merganser and Petrel were loaded aboard the U.S. Navy collier USS Neptune on 3 October 1919. Neptune transported them to the Puget Sound Navy Yard in Bremerton, Washington, arriving there in early 1920. After they were unloaded, Merganser and Petrel were taken to Seattle, Washington, to undergo inspection.

After the inspections were complete, Merganser and Petrel were loaded aboard the Pacific American Fisheries steamer Redwood, which transported them to Kings Cove, Territory of Alaska, where Redwood arrived on 18 June 1920. The BOF intended to use them to conduct fishery patrols in the waters of Alaska, but withheld them from service, and instead sent them back to Seattle for repairs and to modify them for fishery patrol work as funds became available for the repairs and modifications. During the remainder of 1920,Merganser underwent over US$3,000 in repairs at Seattle.

In March 1921, the United States Forest Service vessel Hiawatha towed Merganser to Ketchikan, Territory of Alaska. She conducted no fishery patrols, and nearly a year later, in early 1922, the BOF vessel USFS Auklet towed her from Wrangell, Territory of Alaska, back to Seattle, where she underwent additional repairs and had her original 20-horsepower (15 kW) Alco gasoline engine replaced with a new 16-horsepower (12 kW) engine. After two months in Seattle, she was loaded aboard the Northwestern Fisheries Company ship St. Paul, which transported her to Chignik, Territory of Alaska, arriving there on 25 April 1922.

Merganser finally took up her fishery patrol duties during the 1922 fishing season, and began her career of law enforcement protecting halibut, salmon, sea otter, and fur seal populations in the waters of the Territory of Alaska. Generally, she patrolled actively each year during the fishing season, then was hauled out of the water during each off season.

During the mid-1920s, Merganser was based at Ikatan on Unimak Island in the Aleutian Islands, from which she conducted fishery patrols along the Alaska Peninsula. In 1925, she ran aground on Unimak Island and was declared missing. Sent to search for her, the United States Coast Guard cutter USCGC Haida discovered her 10 days after she ran aground and pulled her free; Merganser was found to have suffered only minor damage.

In 1931, the BOF transferred Merganser from fishery patrol duty to duty as the tender for the fish hatchery at Yes Bay, Territory of Alaska, replacing the BOF launch USFS Puffin in this capacity. After the hatchery closed in 1933, Merganser returned to fishery patrols, operating in the southwestern district in the Territory of Alaska.

== Fish and Wildlife Service ==
In 1939, the BOF was transferred from the United States Department of Commerce to the United States Department of the Interior, and on 30 June 1940, it was merged with the Interior Department's Division of Biological Survey to form the new Fish and Wildlife Service, an element of the Interior Department destined to become the United States Fish and Wildlife Service in 1956. The vessel thus became part of the FWS fleet as US FWS Merganser. Merganser last appeared on an FWS vessel list in 1942; she did not appear on FWS lists in 1943, and presumably was decommissioned in the meantime.
