= USS Parthenia =

Patrol vessel of the United States Navy

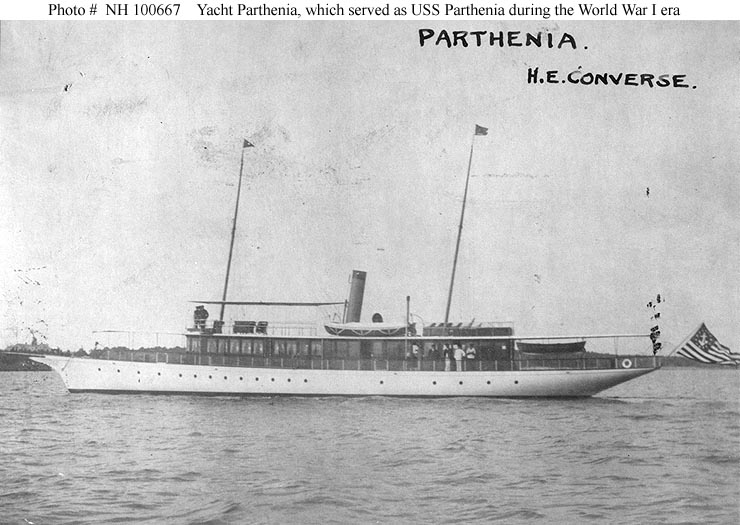
- Parthenia as a private yacht sometime between 1903 and 1917.

History

United States
- Name: USS Parthenia
- Namesake: Previous name retained
- Builder: Herreshoff Manufacturing Company, Bristol, Rhode Island
- Completed: 1903
- Acquired: Purchased 15 August 1917; Delivered 18 August 1917
- Commissioned: 1917
- Fate: Sold 17 August 1920
- Notes: Operated as private yacht Parthenia 1903-1917

General characteristics
- Type: Patrol vessel
- Tonnage: 114 gross register tons
- Length: 131 ft (40 m)
- Beam: 18 ft (5.5 m)
- Draft: 7 ft 5 in (2.26 m)
- Propulsion: Steam engine
- Speed: 13.5 knots
- Complement: 22
- Armament: 1 × 3-pounder gun; 1 × machine gun

USS Parthenia (SP-671) was a United States Navy patrol vessel in commission from 1917 to 1919 or 1920.

Parthenia was built as a private steam yacht of the same name by the Herreshoff Manufacturing Company at Bristol, Rhode Island, in 1903. On 15 August 1917, the U.S. Navy purchased her from Colonel Harry E. Converse for use as a section patrol vessel during World War I. Converse delivered her to the Navy on 18 August 1917, and she was commissioned as USS Parthenia (SP-671).

Parthenia performed patrol duty off the United States East Coast, apparently in New England waters, for the rest of World War I and for some time after the end of the war.

Parthenia was sold on 17 August 1920.
