= USS Wachusett (ID-1840) =

Cargo ship of the United States Navy

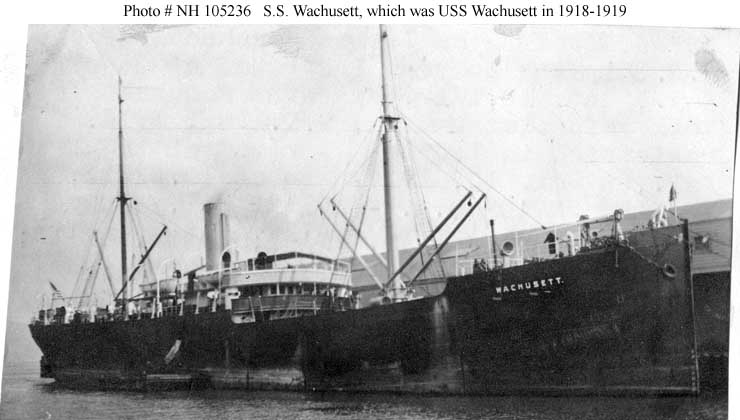
- SS Wachusett, which served as USS Wachusett (ID-1840) from January 1918 to October 1919

History

United States
- Name: USS Wachusett
- Namesake: Mount Wachusett in north central Massachusetts (previous name retained)
- Builder: Blohm & Voss, Hamburg, Germany
- Launched: 25 January 1896
- Completed: 1896
- Acquired: 6 January 1918
- Commissioned: 9 January 1918
- Decommissioned: 6 October 1919
- Fate: Returned to United States Shipping Board, 6 October 1919; scrapped at Baltimore, Maryland, 1924
- Notes: Operated commercially as the German cargo ship SS Ceres 1896-1898 and SS Suevia 1898-1917 and by the United States Shipping Board as SS Wachusett in 1917. Operated by the Department of War with a U.S. Navy crew December 1917-January 1918. Again operated commercially by the United States Shipping Board from 1919 to late 1923 or early 1924.

General characteristics
- Type: Cargo ship
- Tonnage: 3,789 Gross register tons
- Displacement: 9,200 tons
- Length: 387 ft 0 in (117.96 m)
- Beam: 44 ft 2 in (13.46 m)
- Draft: 24 ft 8 in (7.52 m) aft
- Propulsion: Steam
- Speed: 10.7 knots
- Complement: 30
- Armament: None

The second USS Wachusett (ID-1840) was a cargo ship that served in the United States Navy from 1918 to 1919.

Wachusett was built as the freighter SS Ceres in 1896 by Blohm & Voss at Hamburg, Germany. She was renamed Suevia in 1898. Upon the outbreak of World War I in 1914, she was interned by the United States at Manila on Luzon in the Philippines.

Suevia was seized from the Hamburg-America Line in April 1917 at Manila by U.S. Customs Service officials for the United States Shipping Board after the United States entered World War I. Renamed SS Wachusett and assigned identification number (Id. No.) 1840, she initially was operated by the Shipping Board, then was turned over to the U.S. Department of War sometime between 22 December 1917 and 26 December 1917. The U.S. Navy provided her crew and agreed to commission her as soon as possible. The Navy took over SS Wachusett on 6 January 1918 and commissioned her at Hoboken, New Jersey, as USS Wachusett (ID-1840) on 9 January 1918.

Assigned to the Naval Overseas Transportation Service (NOTS) as a United States Army account, she was fitted out for naval service as a cargo ship. She put to sea on 19 January 1918, laden with a cargo of general U.S. Army supplies bound for Brest, France. On 23 January 1918 urgent need for repairs to her radio and engine forced her out of her convoy and into port at Halifax, Nova Scotia, Canada. She completed those repairs on 9 February 1918 and resumed her transatlantic voyage that same day. Her convoy arrived in Brest on 24 February 1918, and Wachusett discharged her cargo. On 18 March 1918, she set out on the return voyage and arrived in New York City on 1 April 1918.

Following a brief repair period, the ship loaded another Army cargo and departed New York, bound for Norfolk, Virginia, and refueling. She steamed out of Hampton Roads, Virginia, on 16 April 1918 and headed across the Atlantic in company with another convoy. She arrived at Le Havre, France, on 7 May 1918, discharged her cargo, and completed her turnaround on 19 May 1918 by putting to sea with a New York-bound convoy.

Wachusett entered New York Harbor on 4 June 1918 and simultaneously began repairs and cargo loading. On 15 June 1918, she stood out of New York, bound southward to Norfolk where she coaled ship on 15 June 1918 before her departure on 16 June 1918 for England. Her convoy entered port at Southampton, England, on 10 July 1918, and she unloaded her 4,300 tons of supplies before heading for the United States on 20 July 1918.

Back in New York on 8 August 1918, she underwent voyage repairs while also loading cargo. Again, she steamed south to Norfolk to coal ship and join an eastbound convoy. She sailed from Norfolk on 21 August 1918 and pulled into Brest on 11 September 1918. Wachusett left Brest on 21 September 1918 after a six-day delay during which she awaited the formation of a homeward-bound convoy. She returned to New York on 15 October 1918, underwent the usual minor repairs, and loaded cargo for her last wartime Atlantic crossing. She stood out of New York on 24 October 1918 in convoy for Brest, where she arrived on 8 November 1918. Three days later, on 11 November 1918, the armistice ended hostilities. Wachusett remained in France for ten more days and then headed back to the United States on 21 November 1918, for the first time unmenaced by the danger of German submarines.

The end of the war, however, did not signal an end to the Navy career of Wachusett. The Navy shifted her from an Army to a United States Shipping Board account in December 1918. After her arrival in New York on 12 December 1918, she loaded 4,445 tons of supplies and, on 22 January 1919, headed back across the Atlantic. She entered port at St. Nazaire, France, on 7 February 1919 and, after discharging her cargo, loaded ordnance material for return to the United States. Departing the French coast on 20 February 1919, she made a brief stop in the Azores en route New York. Diverted from New York, she arrived in Philadelphia, Pennsylvania, instead on 14 March 1919.

Wachusett loaded a partial cargo at Philadelphia and then moved to New York, where she filled out her cargo and topped off her coal bunkers. On 10 April 1919, she left New York with a cargo consigned to the Northern Food Relief bound for Gibraltar, where she was to await further orders. There she received orders to steam to Singapore. She reached Singapore on 27 April 1919 and unloaded her cargo there in late May. Wachusett departed Singapore on 5 June 1919 for Java in the Netherlands East Indies. She visited the Javanese cities of Weltevreden in June and Batavia at the beginning of July. On 12 July 1919, she headed back to Singapore, and departed Singapore on 22 July 1919. Steaming via the Suez Canal and the Mediterranean Sea, Wachusett refueled in the Azores on 8 September 1919 and arrived in New York on the 21 September 1919.

Following voyage repairs, Wachusett was decommissioned on 6 October 1919 and was returned to the United States Shipping Board that same day. She was retained by the Shipping Board in mercantile service until late in 1923 or early in 1924, and scrapped in Baltimore, Maryland, in 1924
