= A Walk to Wachusett =

Essay by Henry David Thoreau

"A Walk to Wachusett" is an 1843 essay written by Henry David Thoreau recounting an excursion he took with a companion, Richard Fuller, from Concord, Massachusetts to the summit of Mount Wachusett located in Princeton, Massachusetts. Their journey, by foot, began on July 19, 1842. Traveling through Acton, Stow, Bolton, Lancaster and Sterling, they arrived in West Sterling by sunset and lodged overnight at a local inn, most likely the Milton Buss Inn and Tavern.

Reaching the summit the following day, the pair had traveled a distance of approximately 34 miles (55 km). Their time on the summit was spent exploring, relaxing and pondering the landscape and its inhabitants. On the third day, they traveled to Harvard, Massachusetts, leaving in the morning of the fourth day as "one bent his steps to the nearer village of Groton, the other took his separate and solitary way to the peaceful meadows of Concord ...."

The signature line of the essay, "Wachusett is, in fact, the observatory of the state", was rewritten from a similar line by Princeton native Charles Theodore Russell in his book History of Princeton published in 1838.

First published in the January 1843 issue of The Boston Miscellany, this was perhaps the first of Thoreau's works describing excursions he took over the years. Later trips, including a return to Wachusett in October 1854 as well as trips to Maine, New Hampshire and Vermont, are documented in his journals.
