= Wachusett Mountain (ski area) =

Ski area in Massachusetts, USA

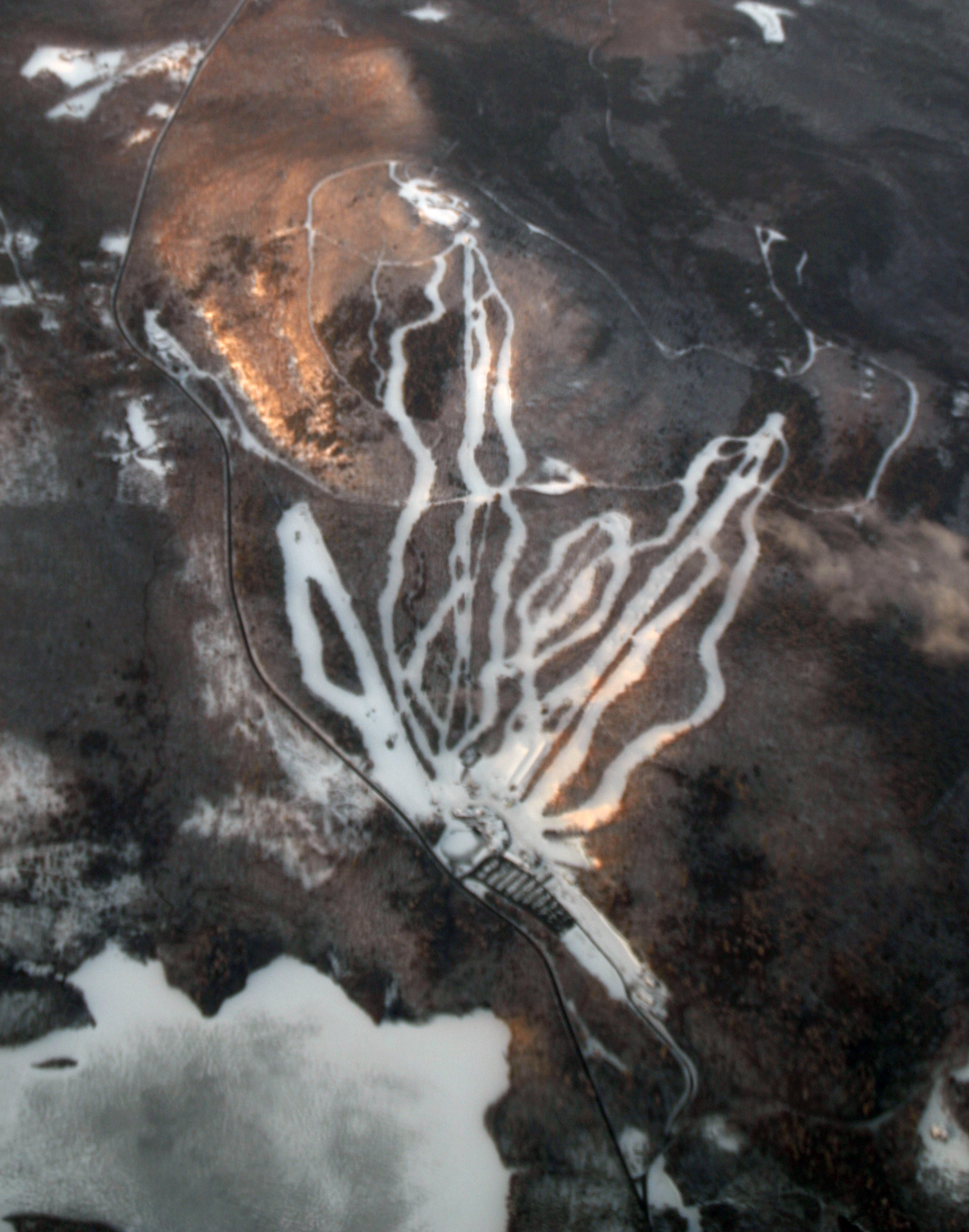
- Aerial view of the ski area

- Location within Massachusetts Location within the United States
- Location: Princeton, Massachusetts
- Nearest city: Worcester
- Coordinates: 42°29′58″N 71°53′11″W
- Vertical: 1,006 ft (307 m)
- Top elevation: 2,006 ft (611 m)
- Base elevation: 1,000 ft (305 m)
- Skiable area: 110 acres (0.45 km^{2})
- Trails: 27
- Longest run: 1.3 mi (2.1 km)
- Lift system: 4 magic carpets 1 triple chairlift 2 high speed quads 1 high speed six
- Terrain parks: Alpine Park; Racing venue
- Snowfall: 100 in (250 cm)
- Snowmaking: 100%
- Night skiing: yes
- Website: wachusett.com

Wachusett Mountain is an alpine ski area in the northeastern United States, located on Mount Wachusett, in the towns of Princeton and Westminster, Worcester County, Massachusetts. The mountain has 27 trails served by eight lifts, including two high-speed quads, one high speed six, four magic-carpet lifts, and a triple chairlift.

There is a bus shuttle service to and from nearby Wachusett station.

Wachusett Mountain has 100% snow-making capacity, and also has night skiing on most of its trails. The mountain is located in the central part of Massachusetts, with the closest major city being Worcester.

== History ==
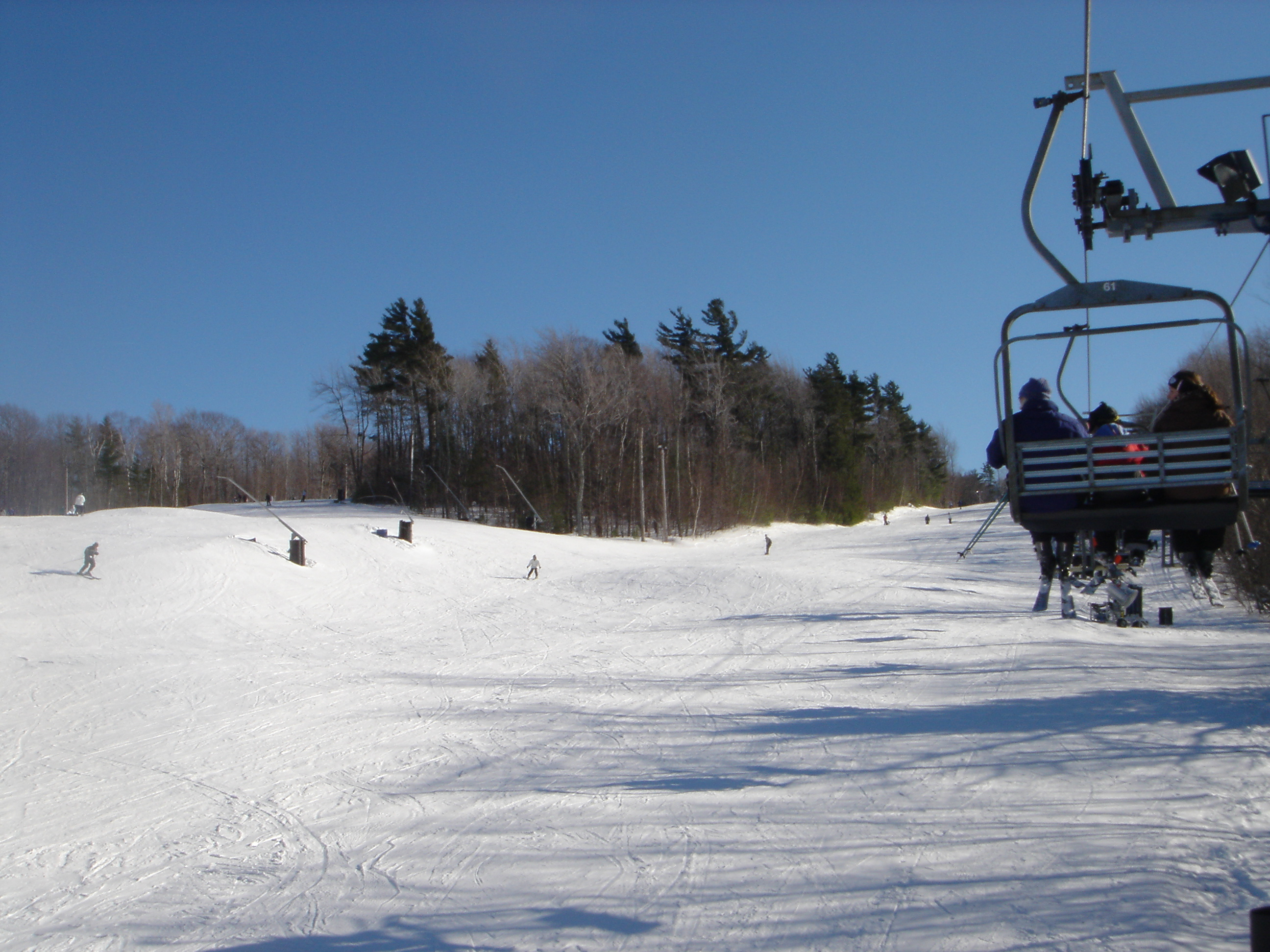
The original Minuteman Triple chair lift

The first ski trails were cut into Mount Wachusett by the Civilian Conservation Corps in 1934 and 1937. Those trails were called Pine Hill Trail and Balance Rock. Today, skiers can still ski down the upper and lower half of Balance rock. The middle section closed in the 1980s. During World War II, the 10th Mountain Division trained at Wachusett. There is now a plaque at the summit commemorating this. The first lifts installed were a T-bar in 1960 (the Oxbow T-Bar) and in 1962 (the West T-Bar). 3,800 feet (1,160 m).

The Massachusetts State Downhill ski championships were run on the Pine Hill Trail until 1966. The race was called off that year after 3 racers were injured and moved in the years following to the Balance Rock Trail until ski area expansion cut that trail in 1983.

In 1969, Ralph Crowley Sr. was granted a lease for a 450-acre (1.8 km^{2}) parcel of land on Mount Wachusett by the state to operate the ski area. In 1982, a major expansion was completed, which included the construction of the base lodge.

Stands of old growth hardwood forest on Mount Wachusett became the object of a court ruling in favor of the Commonwealth of Massachusetts in a joint contract with the ski area regarding plans for a ski slope expansion into an environmental buffer zone around the old growth stand. The old-growth forest contains trees over 350 years old; the buffer zone contained mature trees about half that age. The Sierra Club and other conservation organizations criticized the ruling, and two members of Earth First! staged a sit-in protest by climbing into the crowns of several of the trees in the area slated to be clear cut. As of 2007 wording on the website of the Wachusett Mountain Ski Area included strong language prohibiting skiers and snowboarders from entering the old growth area: "Anyone found entering old growth areas will have their lift ticket revoked. Subsequent offenses will be subject to fines."

== Mountain information ==
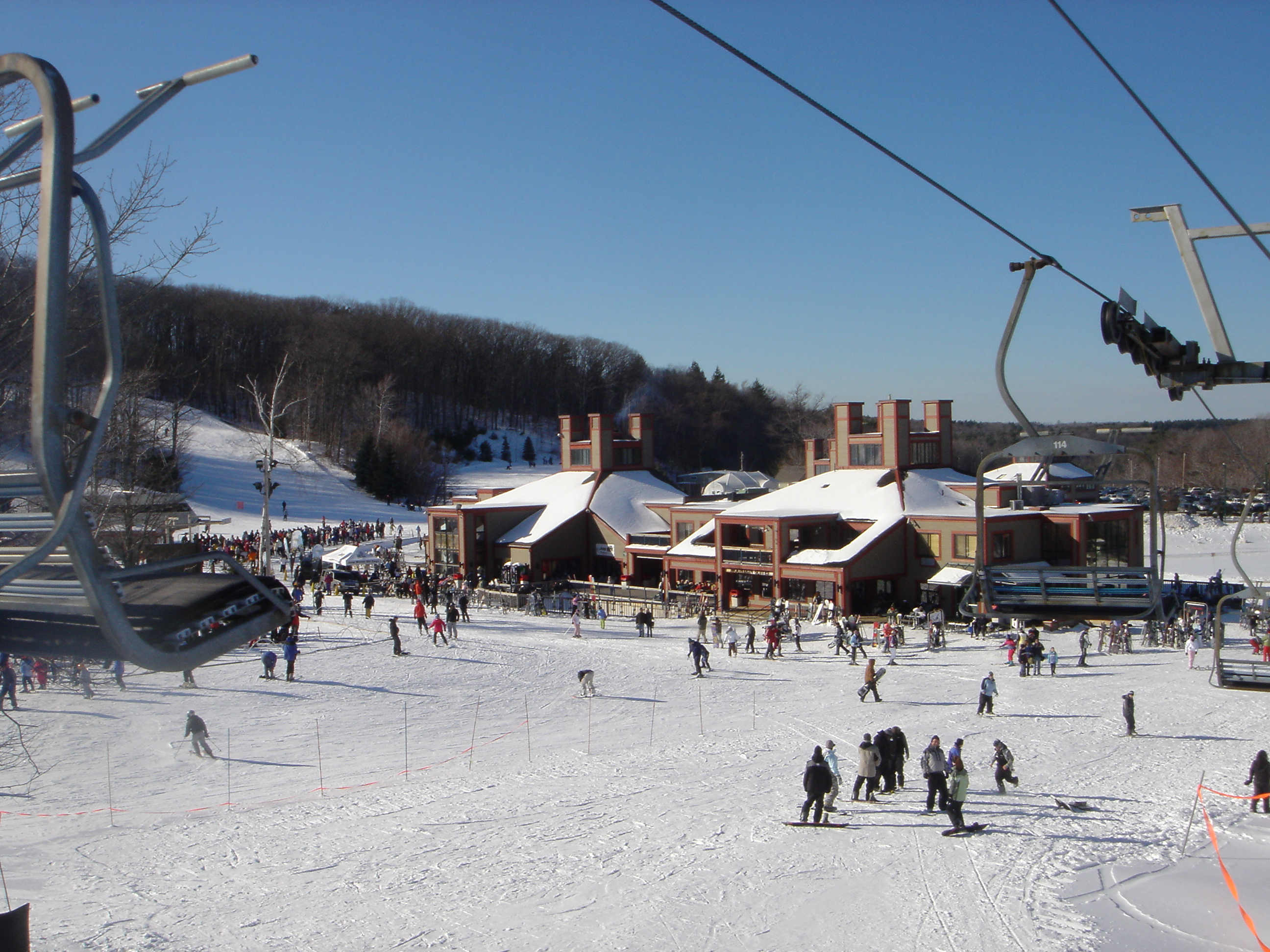
Wachusett Mountain Center

The resort features 27 trails, ranging in difficulty from easiest (green circle) to most difficult (black diamond). Amidst these trails is a terrain park and a racing venue. Two high-speed chairlifts (Minuteman and Monadnock) service the intermediate and beginner peaks respectively, as well as a new high-speed lift for the summit (Polar Express). One additional 3-person chairlift (Vickery Bowl) services the mid-mountain area. Three magic carpets service the mountain's training slopes, with a third open only during weekends and holiday periods for ski school lessons for young children.

In 2006, the National Ski Patrol named Wachusett Mountain Ski Patrol as the best Large Alpine Patrol in the country.

The base lodge was expanded in 2000, being completed in 2001, and is now nearly 50,000 sq ft (5,000 m^{2}). It contains public areas, a cafeteria, The Black Diamond restaurant, and private suites, that are available for daily rental.

The resort used to include the nearby Wachusett Village Inn, which provided overnight accommodations. The Inn was sold in 2016 and is now a rehabilitation center owned and operated by Recovery Centers Of America.

=== Trails ===
| Easier | More Difficult | Most Difficult |
|---|---|---|
| 5 | 17 | 5 |

| Trail Name | Origin |
|---|---|
| Sundowner | It is the last trail that the sun sets on due to its exposure to the west. |
| Indian Summer | This trail is named after the weather phenomenon sometimes called an "Indian Summer". This is when there is an unusually warm patch of weather during the late fall. |
| Ralph's Run | Named after Ralph Crowley Sr, who led Wachusett Mountain to what it is today before dying in 1996. |
| Frannie's Folly | Named after Ralph Crowley Sr.'s wife, Frannie Crowley. |
| Look Mom | A joke referring to how a kid might tell their mom, "Look mom, no hands!" or in this case, "Look mom, no poles!" |
| Hitchcock | Named after John Hitchcock, an environmentalist and member of the Wachusett Mountain Advisory council from 1969-1983. |
| Upper/Lower 10th Mountain | Named after the 10th Mountain Corp who used Wachusett as an arctic training ground during WWII. Some of the mountain's trails were cut by them. |
| Upper/Lower Smith Walton | Named after Stephen Smith and David Walton, frequent skiers of Wachusett, after they died in separate instances helping people climb in Grand Teton National Park. |
| Upper Conifer/Conifer Connection | Both trails travel through a part of the mountain with many conifer trees. |

=== Lifts ===
- Wachusett has 4 chairlifts and 4 surface lifts.

| Name | Type | Manufacturer | Built | Vertical (feet) | Length (feet) | Capacity (pph) | Notes |
|---|---|---|---|---|---|---|---|
| Polar Express | High Speed Six | Doppelmayr | 2025 | 945 | 4316 | 2600 | Main lift to the summit of Wachusett. Replaced the original summit high speed quad. Open in the summer for events and specific dates. |
| Minuteman Express | High Speed Quad | Doppelmayr | 1999 | 600 | 3516 | 2600 | Open during the summer on limited dates. |
| Monadnock Express | High Speed Quad | Doppelmayr | 2011 | 299 | 2205 | 2400 | Lift serving the beginner area |
| Vickery Bowl | Triple | Doppelmayr | 2004 | 209 | 1500 | - | Main lift for the terrain park, was relocated from where the Minuteman Express was after being in storage for a few years. |
| Shorty | Surface Lifts | Sunkid | 2024 | 5 | 50 | - | Shortened part of the former "Whittier’s Teaching Meadow" carpet. |
| Ollie's Carpet | Surface Lifts | Sunkid | 2003 | 18 | 300 | - | Carpet serving the ski school area |
| Polar Kids | Surface Lifts | Sunkid | 2024 | 15 | 150 | - | Carpet serving the Polar Kids area of the mountain. |
| Easy Rider | Surface Lifts | Sunkid | 2003 | - | 350 | - | Carpet serving the Easy Rider trail |

== See also ==
- Midstate Trail (Massachusetts)
