= USS Neptune (AC-8) =

Collier of the United States Navy

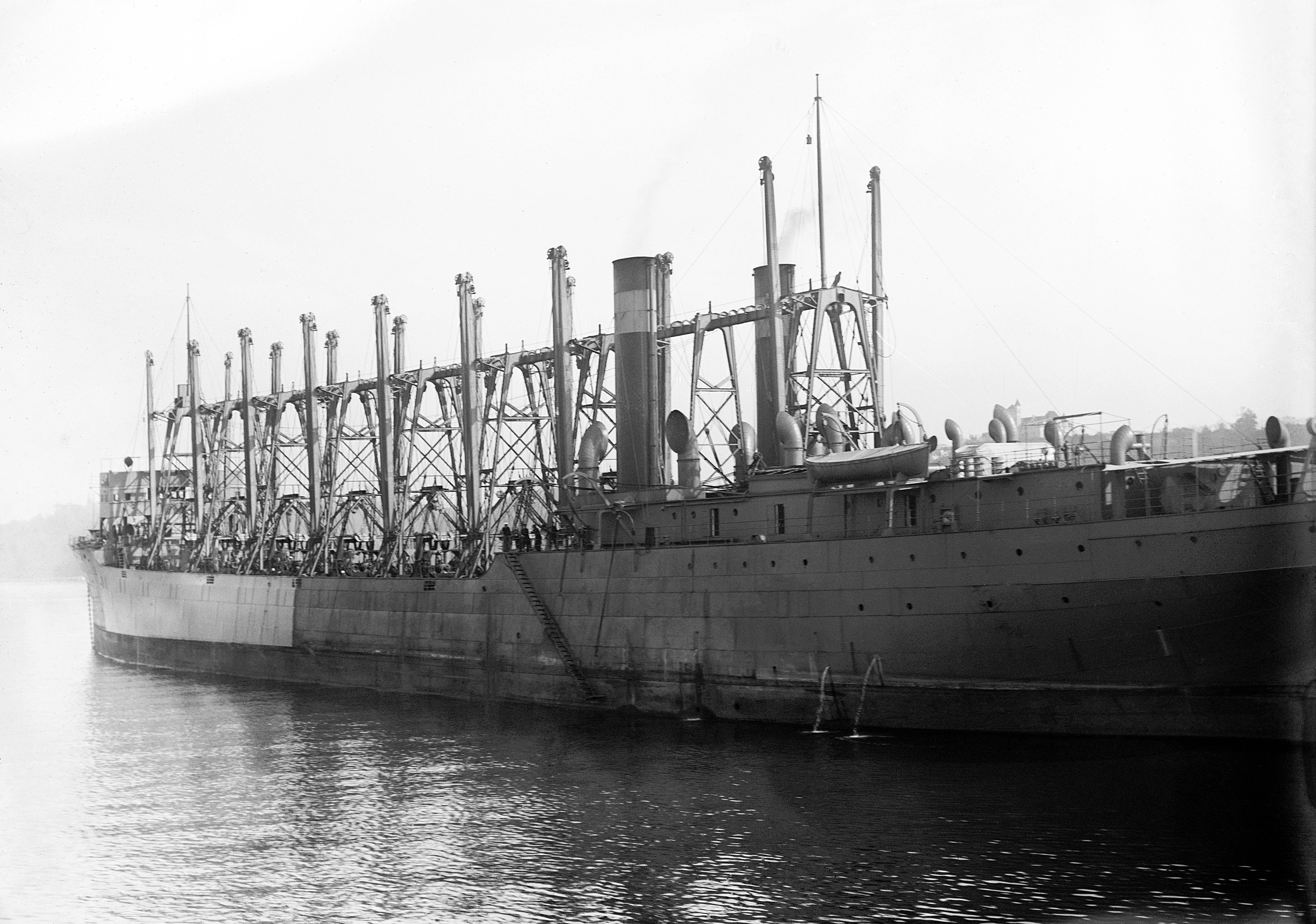
- USS Neptune c. 1911–1915

History

United States
- Name: USS Neptune
- Builder: Maryland Steel Co., Sparrows Point, Maryland
- Laid down: 23 March 1910
- Launched: 21 January 1911
- Commissioned: 20 September 1911
- Decommissioned: 28 June 1922
- Stricken: 14 May 1938
- Identification: AC-8
- Fate: Sold for scrap, 18 April 1939

General characteristics
- Type: Collier
- Tonnage: 19,375 t (19,069 long tons)
- Length: 542 ft (165 m)
- Beam: 65 ft (20 m)
- Draught: 27.7 ft (8.4 m)
- Propulsion: Coal fired steam turbine, single propeller
- Speed: 12.9 knots
- Complement: 104
- Armament: Four 4"/50 gun mounts

The third USS Neptune (AC–8), a collier of the U.S. Navy, was laid down by the Maryland Steel Co., Sparrows Point, Md. 23 March 1910; launched 21 January 1911; and placed in service with a merchant crew at Norfolk Navy Yard 20 September 1911.

Except for a period out of service at Norfolk Navy Yard 6 May to 5 December 1912, Neptune operated along the east coast and in the Caribbean from Boston to Guantanamo Bay, Cuba, supporting ships and installations of the Atlantic Fleet into 1913. Continuing her replenishment operations, she made two coaling voyages to Vera Cruz, Mexico in the spring and summer of 1913, returned to Norfolk 8 September, decommissioned there 13 October, and was placed in reserve.

Neptune commissioned with a naval complement 7 December 1914 and resumed collier service with the Atlantic Fleet. Assigned to the Auxiliary Division, Atlantic Fleet on 28 December 1915, she continued this duty into 1917. She made four voyages to Santo Domingo between June 1916 and February 1917, carrying Marines, fuel and mail to support Navy and Marine Corps Units protecting American interests in the Dominican Republic during unrest there.

When the United States entered World War I, Neptune was at Baltimore, Maryland, loading general cargo. Departing that port, she put into Norfolk to embark a division of the 1st Aeronautical Detachment and sailed 25 May 1917 for France escorted by destroyers Jarvis and Perkins. Arriving at St. Nazaire on 8 June, the ship offloaded her cargo and disembarked her troops, the first American forces to land in Europe for service against the enemy. Neptune sailed for home 28 June, arriving at New York on 11 July. The vessel again resumed service with the Train, Atlantic Fleet, making one voyage to the Caribbean, 12 July to 27 August, and then operated off the Atlantic Coast, delivering coal to ports in Chesapeake Bay through the end of the war.

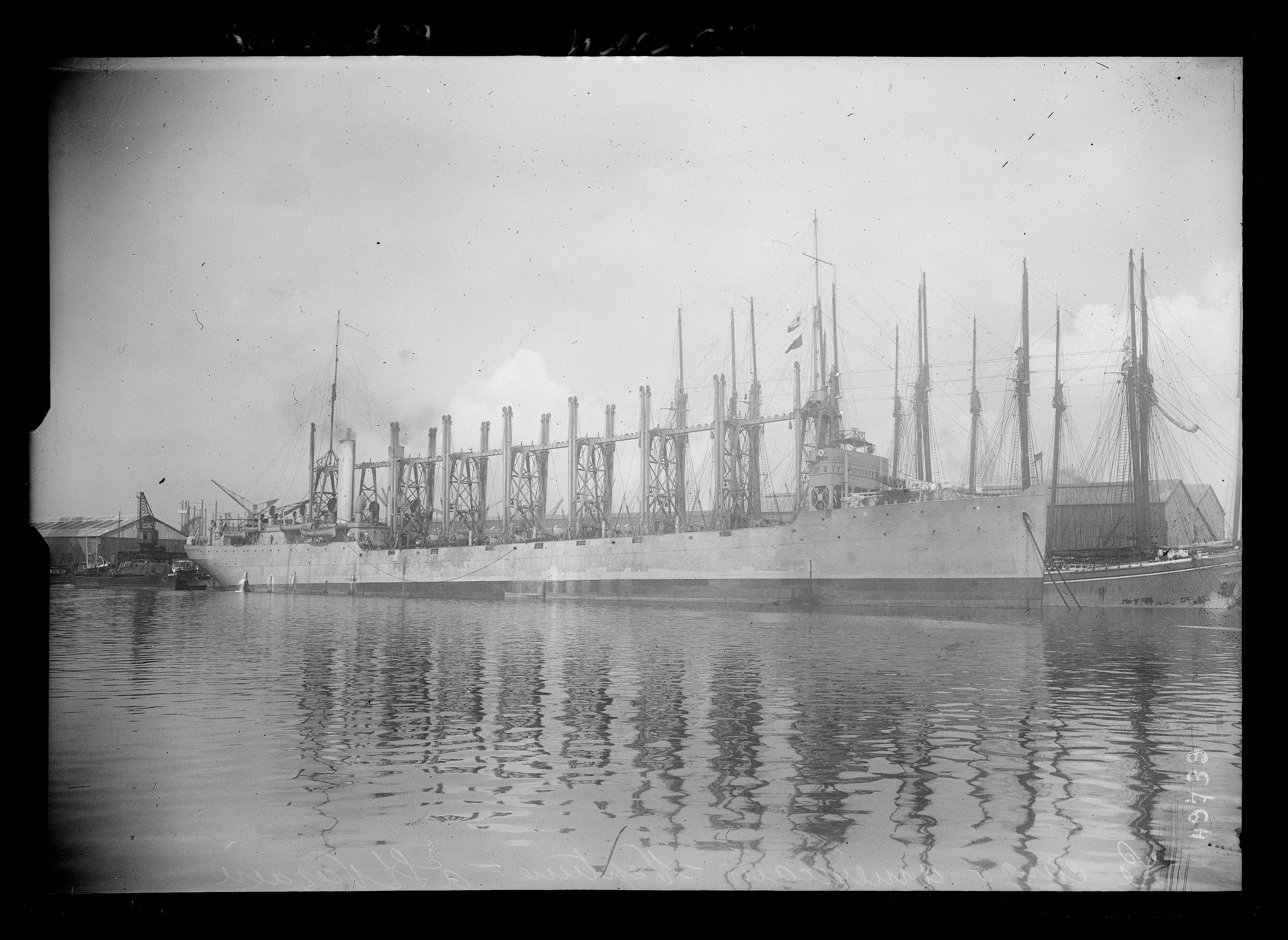
USS Neptune in Saint-Nazaire in June 1917.

In 1919, following three voyages to Guantanamo Bay to supply naval forces at the training base there, the collier departed Norfolk on 3 October for the Pacific, calling en route at the Panama Canal Zone, Nicaragua, and Honduras with Marines and cargo and arriving at San Diego on 20 October. She then operated along the West Coast, coaling ships and supplying naval bases between Bremerton, Washington, and San Diego. Returning to the east coast the way she came, the collier arrived at Norfolk on 20 January 1920. Neptune made another coaling voyage to the west coast before departing Philadelphia on 27 August for an eleven-month cruise as part of the Train, Pacific Fleet. She visited Pearl Harbor from 8 September to 25 October and cruised to Valparaíso, Chile in January and February 1921 to coal units of the Battle Force engaged in maneuvers off the Chilean coast. The collier returned to Norfolk 11 July and made one more voyage to the West Coast from 23 July to 30 December and a coaling cruise to the Caribbean, 25 January to 3 April 1922 before decommissioning at Boston on 28 June 1922.

Towed by tugs Kalmia and Wandank, Neptune departed Boston 14 December on her last voyage, arriving at Philadelphia three days later. There the ship remained in reserve, until struck from the Navy List 14 May 1938 and sold for scrapping to Northern Metals Co., Philadelphia 18 April 1939.
