= Bethany Veney =

American writer

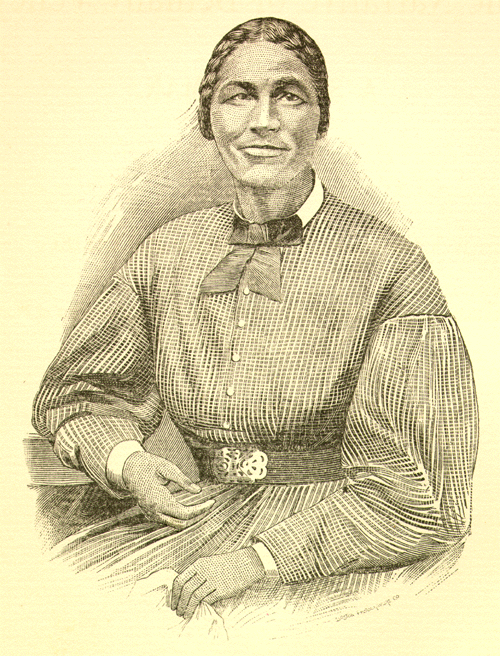
- Born: Bethany Johnson; March 19, 1812 near Luray, Virginia, in what is now Page County, Virginia
- Died: November 16, 1915; Worcester, Massachusetts
- Other names: "Aunt Betty", Betsy, "Aunt Betsy"
- Known for: Aunt Betty's Story: The Narrative of Bethany Veney, A Slave Woman (1889)
- Spouses: Jerry Fickland; Frank Veney
- Children: Charlotte E. Fickland (1844 –1921); Joe Veney
- Parent(s): Joseph and Charlotte Johnson

Bethany Veney (March 19, 1812 – November 16, 1915 (Note: Some sources state that she died in 1916, but newspapers from 1915 reported her death that year. In addition, her death record states that she died on November 16, 1915.)), was an American writer whose autobiography and slave narrative, Aunt Betty's Story: The Narrative of Bethany Veney, A Slave Woman, was published in 1889. Born into slavery on a farm near Luray, Virginia, as Bethany Johnson, she married twice. Her first husband was an enslaved man, Jerry Fickland, with whom she had a daughter, Charlotte. He was sold away from her and she later married Frank Veney, a free black man. She was sold on an auction block to her final enslaver, George J. Adams, who brought her to Providence, Rhode Island and freed her. After the American Civil War, Veney made four trips to Virginia to move her daughter and her family and 16 additional family members north to New England.

== Early life ==
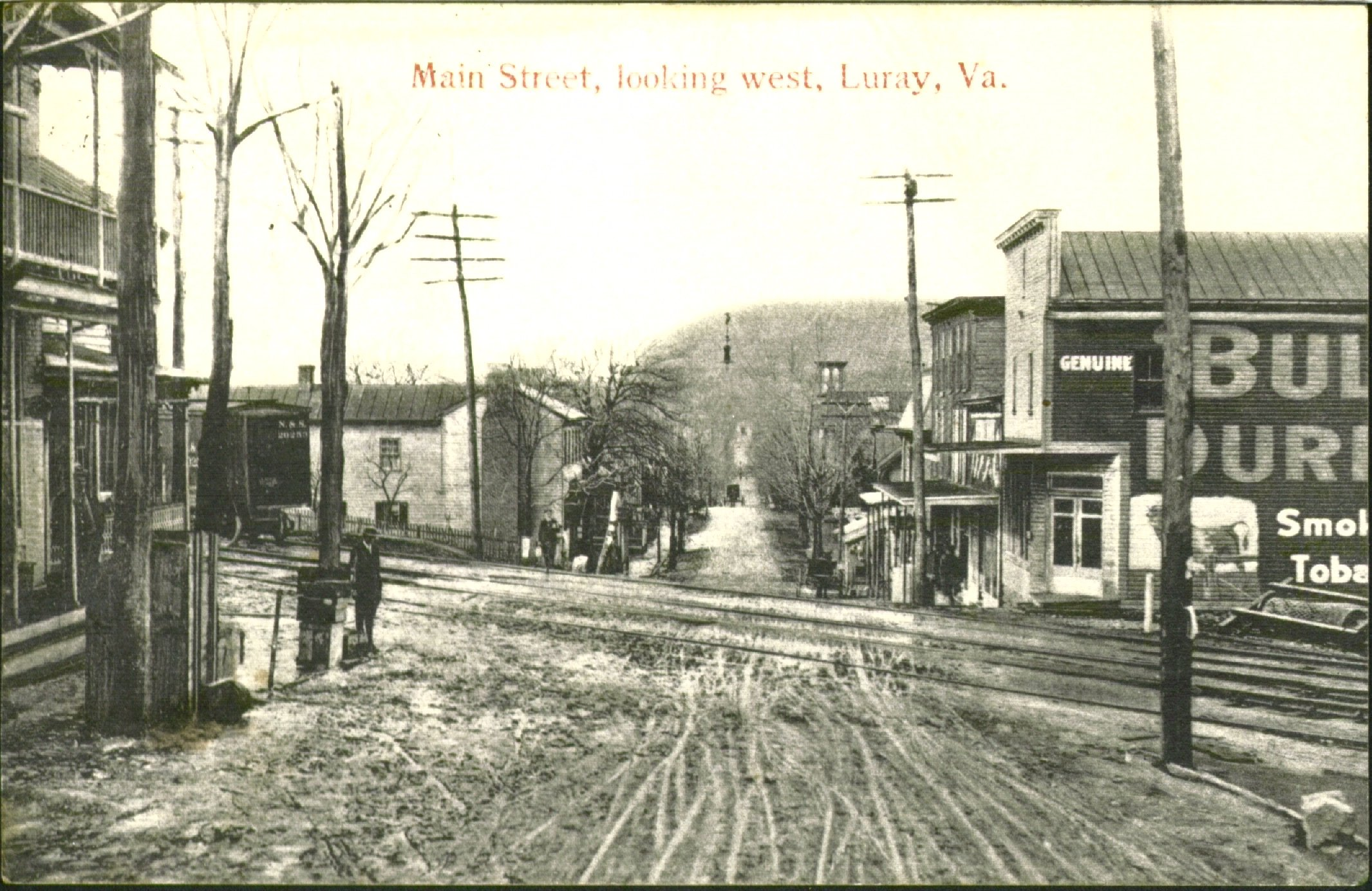
Luray, Virginia, in 1910

In 1812, Bethany Johnson was born into slavery on the Pass Run farm, near Luray, in what is now Page County, Virginia. Her parents, Charlotte and Joseph Johnson, had five children, (Note: In her death record, there was no name for her mother. Her father was just identified by the surname Stevens. Her daughter, Charlotte E. Jackson, provided the information.) including Matilda and Stephen. Veney was of African-American and Blackfoot heritage. She was enslaved by James Fletcher, who owned Pass Run. Fletcher's daughter Nasenith taught her a fire and brimstone lesson about the repercussions of lying, which was softened by her mother's lesson about the rewards of being truthful. The lesson about honesty had a life-long impact that helped her fight for herself.

Occasionally, Fletcher called on Veney to sing and dance for his visitors. Her mother died when she was about nine years of age, and she did not know her father. Soon after her mother's death, Fletcher died. The enslaved people that he held were left to his five daughters and two sons, who split up her family. Lucy Fletcher, who Veney considered to be kindhearted, received her and her sister Matilda. (Note: Her grandmother had begged to be placed with Veney, but her grandmother and her Uncle Peter went to Nasenith Fletcher.) Lucy was unmarried, and she and the people she enslaved moved in with her sister Nasenith Fletcher and David Kibbler after these latter were married on January 25, 1827. (Note: Landau stated that Lucy married David Kibbler, but according to Veney's account, it was Lucy's sister Nasenith who married Kibler.) For some time, Veney was hired out to a woman who fed and clothed her in exchange for her labor. Veney considered this woman kind because she gave Veney enough food to survive and did not whip her. Veney remarked that white children not born into slavery would have a different definition of kindness. David Kibbler was a cruel master who was violent towards all the enslaved people in his household. Veney was once whipped with a nail rod that made her lame, and then was whipped again after her mistress inquired about the cause of her injury and asked Kibbler about it. Once, when she was told to cut a switch to be beaten with, she ran away from the injustice of the beating. After a night of heavy rain, she sought assistance from Kibbler's father, also an enslaver who beat his slaves. Once he heard her story, he and Veney visited Kibbler, who was told by his father not to whip her. She returned to Kibbler's house and was not beaten.

== Religion ==
Kibbler's brother Jerry and sister Sally were converted Methodists, who found religion after attending a camp meeting. They outfitted a schoolhouse building in Luray to serve as a venue for church services and revival meetings and encouraged Veney to become a Christian. Lucy arranged for someone to take Veney to a camp meeting, where a hymn inspired her.

Then let this feeble body fail,
Or let it faint or die,
My soul shall quit this mournful vale,
And soar to worlds on high,
Shall join those distant saints,

And find its long-sought rest.

Veney began to pray for her freedom, believing that if she were a good Christian, she would be freed from slavery. Veney wished to earn her own money and save it until she could afford a house with a lovely garden. She relied on her faith to endure difficult times. Still a young girl, she was severely punished by her slaveholder for attending church. She continued to attend church when she was hired out to Mr. Levers and after she got before Kibbler and begged to be allowed to attend church. He said, "Well, I'll go the devil if you ain't my match. Yes, go to meeting..." From that point forward, she was able to attend church. She became known for her honesty and devotion.

== Marriage and children ==
Around the late 1830s, Bethany Johnson married Jerry Fickland, an enslaved man who lived seven miles from her on the other side of the Blue Ridge Mountains. They received permission to marry from their enslavers, and they had a simple wedding ceremony. Knowing their enslavers could separate them at any time, they excluded promises to be accurate and forsake all others. They continued to live at the plantations of their enslavers and could only visit one another when they were given permission and received a pass to travel on the roads without being picked up as runaways.

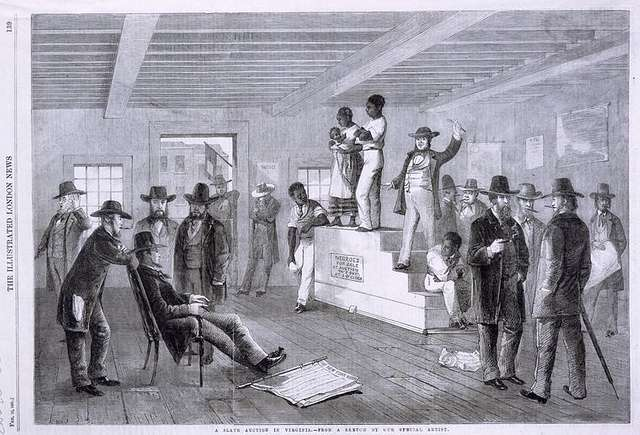
A slave auction in Virginia

Owned by the indebted Jonas Mannyfield (also spelled Menefee), Fickland was taken to Little Washington, Virginia slave pen, where he was to be auctioned around March 1843. Veney was permitted to go to see her husband. She traveled more than a day to meet up with Fickland's mother, and they went together to the slave pen where Fickland and the rest of Mannyfield's slaves were held. Slave trader Frank White bought the enslaved people intending to sell them in the Deep South. Fickland was sent by White to get his wife, promising they would be kept together. Realizing they would not likely be kept together and suffer in the harsh cotton fields and rice swamps further south, Fickland fled for the mountains. He was ultimately captured by slave trader David McCoy. Veney never saw him again. Their daughter, Charlotte E. Fickland, was born in January 1844. She was named after Veney's mother. Realizing that her daughter would be subject to owner's sexual abuse, without a means of redress, she said of her feelings from that time,

My dear white lady, in your pleasant home made joyous by the tender love of husband and children all your own, you can never understand the slave mother's emotions as she clasps her new-born child, and knows that a master's word can at any moment take it from her embrace; and when, as was mine, that child is a girl, and from her own experience she sees its almost certain doom is to minister to the unbridled lust of the slave-owner, and feels that the law holds over her no protecting arm, it is not strange that, rude and uncultured as I was, I felt all this, and would have been glad if we could have died together there and then.

— Bethany Veney

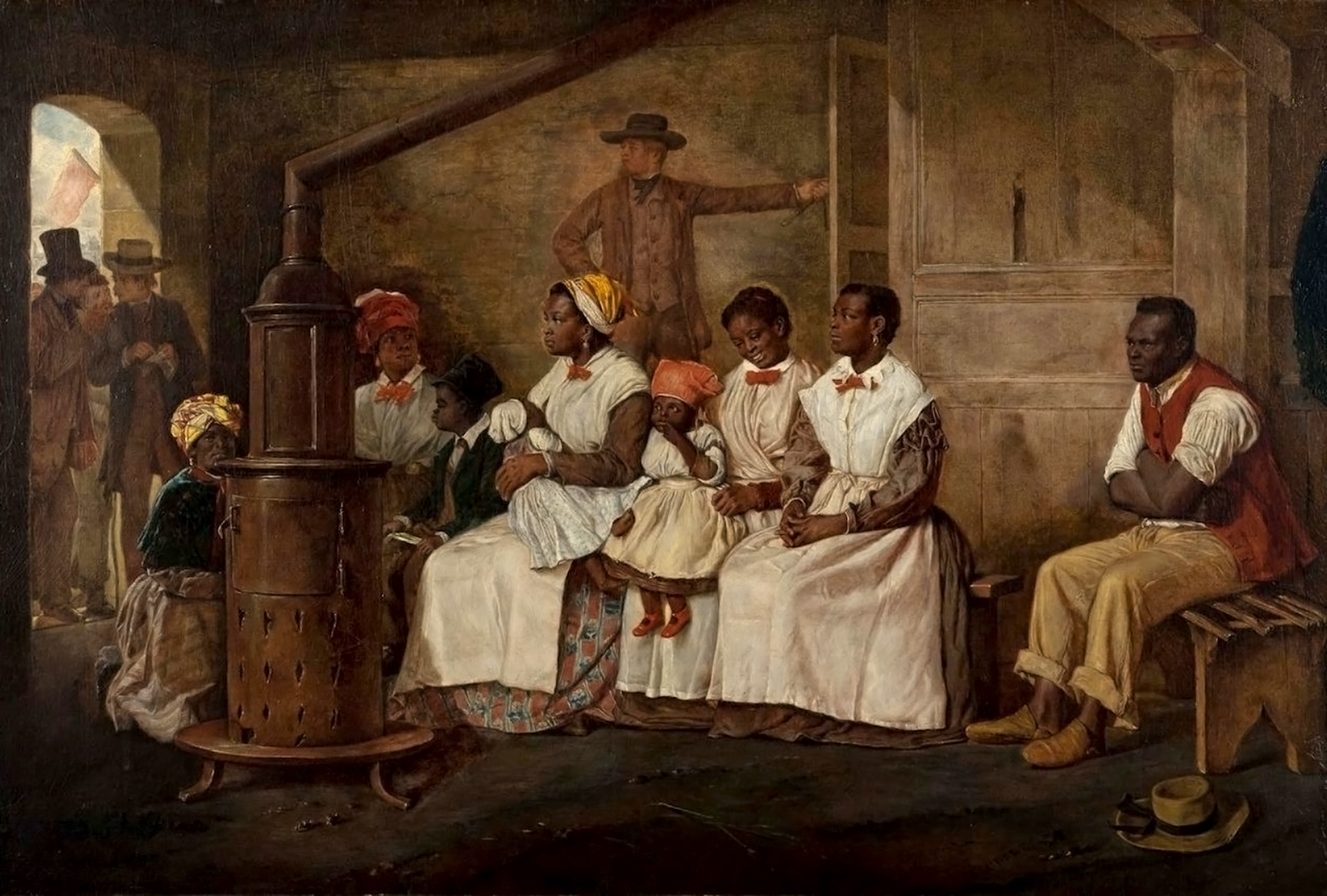
"Slaves Waiting for Sale." Enslaved women and children, dressed in new clothes, wait to be sold in Richmond, Virginia, in the 19th century. Based on a sketch of 1853.

She and her daughter were sold to John Printz Sr. of Luray at Veney's request. She worked for his family until the early 1850s when she was sold to McCoy and his partner John O'Neile. Her daughter remained with the Printz family. When she realized she was about to be sold, she asked a white person from church to purchase her, but she was declined. She was brought to the slave auction in Richmond, Virginia, and she pretended to be sick by putting baking soda in her mouth before bidding began. She foamed at the mouth, and no sale was made. Veney worked in the McCoy household and was hired out, in which case she paid McCoy $20 a year and kept the rest of her earnings. She was able to visit her daughter periodically.

She married a free black man, Frank Veney, becoming Bethany Veney. Frank built roads for McCoy. Veney met Frank when she was a cook for the road construction crew. They had a son named Joe.

== Stony Man ==
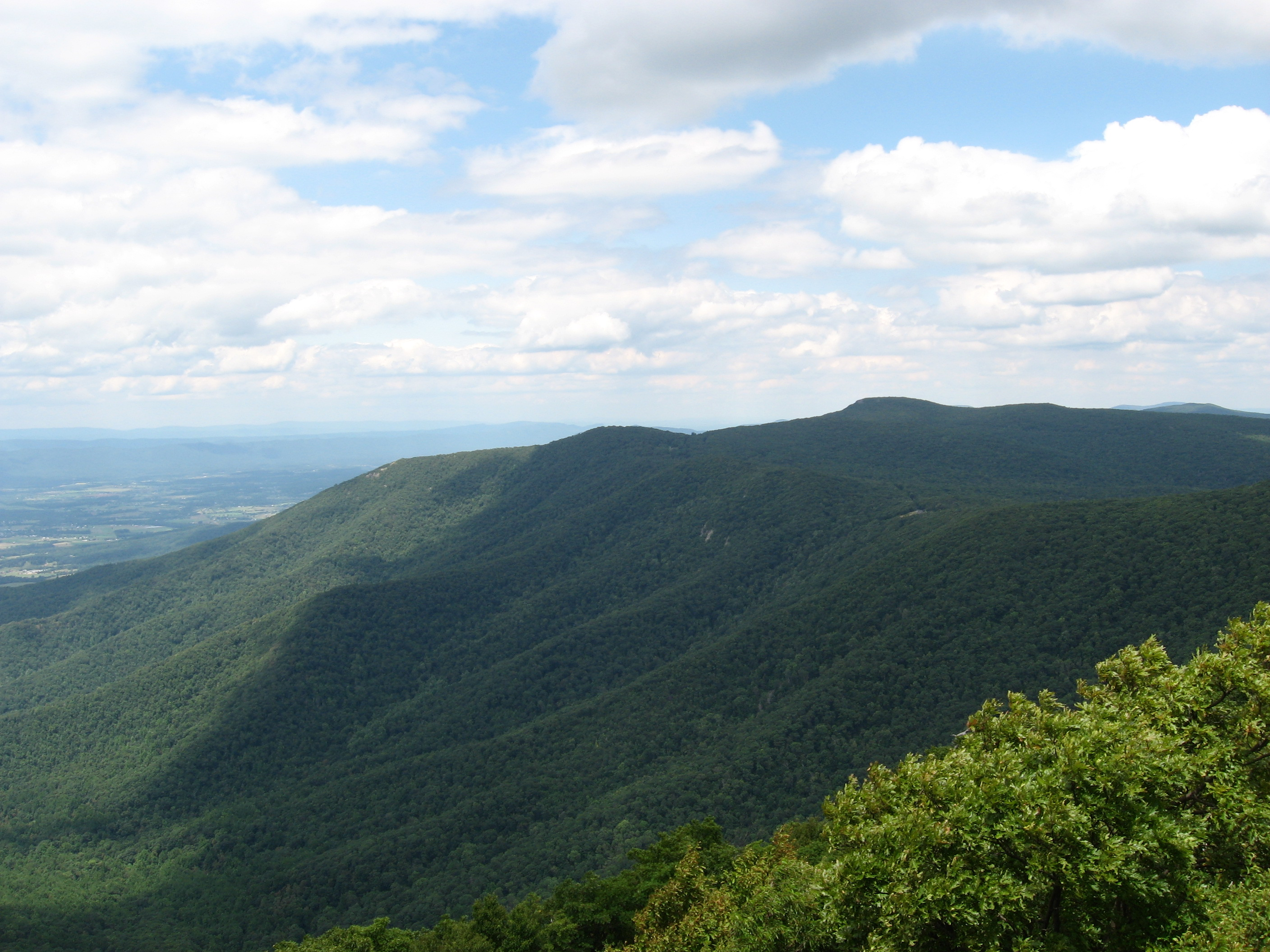
Stony Man Mountain viewed from Hawksbill in Shenandoah National Park, Virginia

Veney made arrangements with David McCoy and John Printz that allowed her to rent a house from Pritz on Stony Man Mountain, a mountain spur south of Luray. She supported herself and her son by keeping wages early by being hired out and paying a $30 annual fee to McCoy for his share of her earnings.

In the late 1850s, Veney was hired for $1.50 per week as a cook and housekeeper for copper mining speculators—George J. Adams and J. Butterworth, of Providence, Rhode Island—who reopened a mine near Stony Man Mountain. McCoy's property was seized and auctioned due to his gambling debts. On December 27, 1858, Adams purchased Veney and her son Joe for $775 (equivalent to $28,839 in 2025).

== New England ==
Adams moved Veney and her son to Providence in August 1859 and freed both. Veney supported herself by taking in laundry and selling bluing door-to-door. Her son Joe died of an illness late that year. Living in New England, she was separated from her daughter, son-in-law, and husband. Frank Veney went on to marry another woman after three years had passed. Frank claimed that Veney was his ninth of 25 wives in an article published by The Page News and Courier in 1915. It was too dangerous for a lone Black woman to travel to Virginia to visit her family following John Brown's raid on Harpers Ferry (October 1859) and the commencement of the American Civil War (1861–1865).

Veney worked for the Adams family in Providence and then moved with them to Worcester, Massachusetts, in 1860. Before the war, she made large pots of gruel that she brought out to the camps of the Worcester Volunteers. She continued to sell bluing and take in washing in Massachusetts. Feeling comfortable there, knowing that she was safe from being sold on auction blocks, she remained in Worcester after the Adams' family returned to Providence. Veney joined the Park Street Methodist Church, a white church, and was a founder of the African Methodist Episcopal Bethel Church in 1867, and was a prominent member of the church. For more than 50 years, she walked to the Sterling Camp Meeting Grounds in Sterling, Massachusetts, a nearly 12-mile walk from her house that is estimated to take about 4 hours one-way. (Note: The nearly 12 mile trip from 21 Winfield Street in Worcester to the Stirling Campground (just south of East and West Wauschacum Ponds) would have taken an estimated 4 hours to walk.)

After the end of the Civil War, Veney collected family members that she missed dearly and brought them to live in New England. She started with her daughter, son-in-law Aaron Jackson, and grandchild, who lived adjacent to her, and then made three more trips to move 16 more relatives north. While in the Luray, Virginia area, she also met up with three of her former enslavers, McCoy, Printz, and Kibbler. She was grateful to be on the other side of the suffering that she endured for years and to be reunited with her family. In Worcester, she purchased a house for herself at 21 Winfield Street and other houses for her extended family.

== Narrative of Bethany Veney, a Slave Woman ==
In 1889, the Narrative of Bethany Veney, a Slave Woman was published. It was dictated to a white woman with the initials M. W. G. The narrative documents her life as an enslaved child and woman. She describes her religious conversion and religion's role in her life. Her narrative includes two letters from two ministers, Rev. Erastus Spaulding of Millbury and the Rev. V.A. Cooper. One of them describes Veney's strength of character and the other focuses on the sinfulness of slavery. Veney also describes her life in the North after attaining her freedom. Jared Silverstein, author of The Faith of a Woman: a Slave Narrative of Love, Despair, and Atonement said, "Her short yet powerful narrative reveals how her unremitting faith in God empowered her to navigate the most trying of circumstances, from childhood as a slave to adulthood as a woman fighting for her freedom." Veney had a unique approach to writing her narrative. She shared her story of humanity, focusing on her heartache and the morals that she lived by rather than documenting how slavery was horrible.

== Later years and death ==
Veney remained active throughout her life. (Note: In 1909, the newspaper reported that she got off a train six miles before her destination so that she could walk it and pick blueberries on the way.) She died at her daughter's house in Worcester on November 16, 1915, and was buried at Hope Cemetery in the same city. Beside her is her daughter Charlotte who died February 14, 1921.

== Legacy ==
On July 12, 2003, the Governor of Massachusetts, Mitt Romney, signed a proclamation honoring Bethany Veney and her life by declaring the day "Bethany Veney Day in Worcester, Massachusetts".

In Collected Black Women's Narratives, Anthony Gerard recognized Veney—along with Susie King Taylor, Nancy Prince, and Louisa Picquet—as a "woman [who] strove to maintain her dignity and independence in an increasingly violent and consistently racist America." He further states that her narrative documents "Veney's experiences in slavery and in freedom and her spiritual growth throughout her life" and "revealed her defiance, ingenuity, fortitude, and independence. In the inhuman grip of chattel slavery, Veney continually demonstrates her humanity..."

== Bibliography ==
- Diouf, Sylviane A. (Sylviane Anna) (2001). Growing up in slavery. Brookfield, Conn.: Millbrook Press. ISBN 978-0-7613-1763-0.
- Landau, Elaine (2001). Slave narratives : the journey to freedom. New York: Franklin Watts. ISBN 978-0-531-11743-9.
- Veney, Bethany (1889). The narrative of Bethany Veney, a slave woman. Worcester, Massachusetts.
- Williams, Heather Andrea (2012). Help me to find my people : the African American search for family lost in slavery. Chapel Hill: University of North Carolina Press. ISBN 978-0-8078-3554-8.
