= Martha Mary Chapel =

Historic church in Massachusetts, United States

- Martha–Mary Chapel
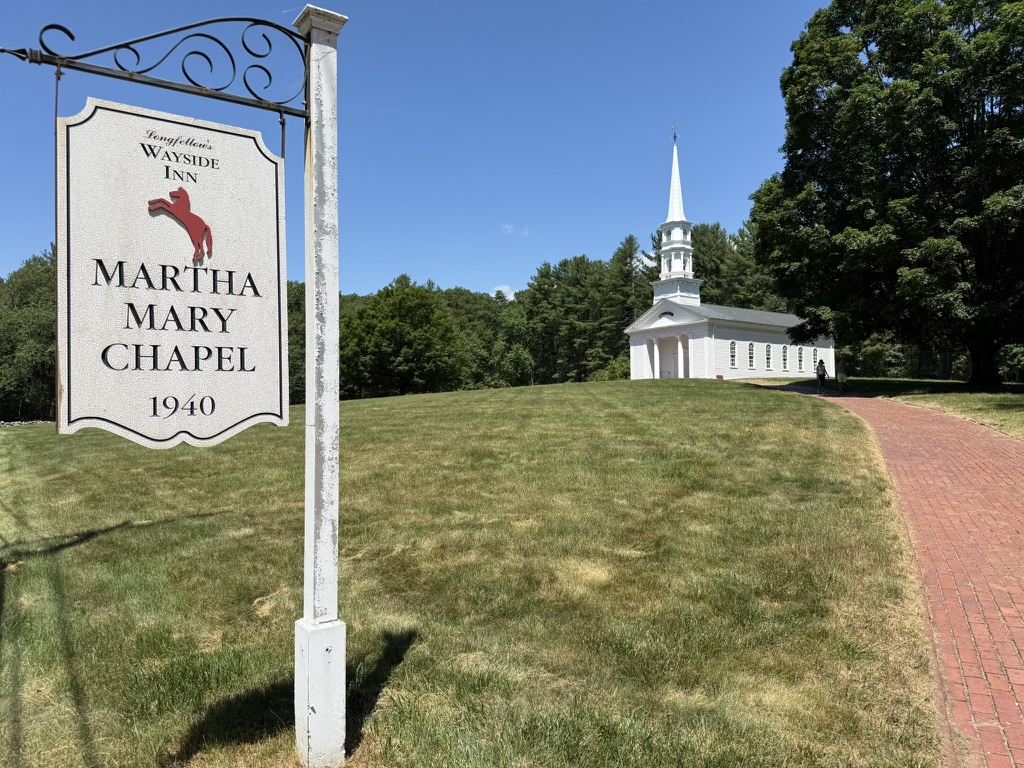
- Pictured in 2025
- Martha Mary Chapel
- 42.358614°N 71.471759°W
- Location: Wayside Inn Road, Sudbury, Massachusetts, U.S.

Architecture
- Architectural type: Italianate
- Years built: 1940 (86 years ago)

The Martha Mary Chapel, also written as the Martha–Mary Chapel, is a non-denominational church within the Wayside Inn Historic District in Sudbury, Massachusetts, United States. It stands on Wayside Inn Road (so named for the nearby tavern), at its intersection with Dutton Road. Henry Ford built another six chapels of the same name, including at Greenfield Village in Dearborn, Michigan, in 1929. The one in Sudbury was widely believed to be the finest.

== Background ==
In 1940, Ford built a replica and fully working gristmill and a white non-denominational chapel, named after his mother, Mary, and mother-in-law, Martha. It was constructed from the wood of trees which fell nearby during the New England hurricane of 1938.

In the grounds of the chapel stands the Redstone School, a one-room schoolhouse which was moved from its original location in Sterling, Massachusetts, by Ford, who believed the building was the actual schoolhouse mentioned in Sarah Josepha Hale's poem "Mary Had a Little Lamb".
