= The Wayside Inn (Sudbury) =

Historic house in Massachusetts, United States

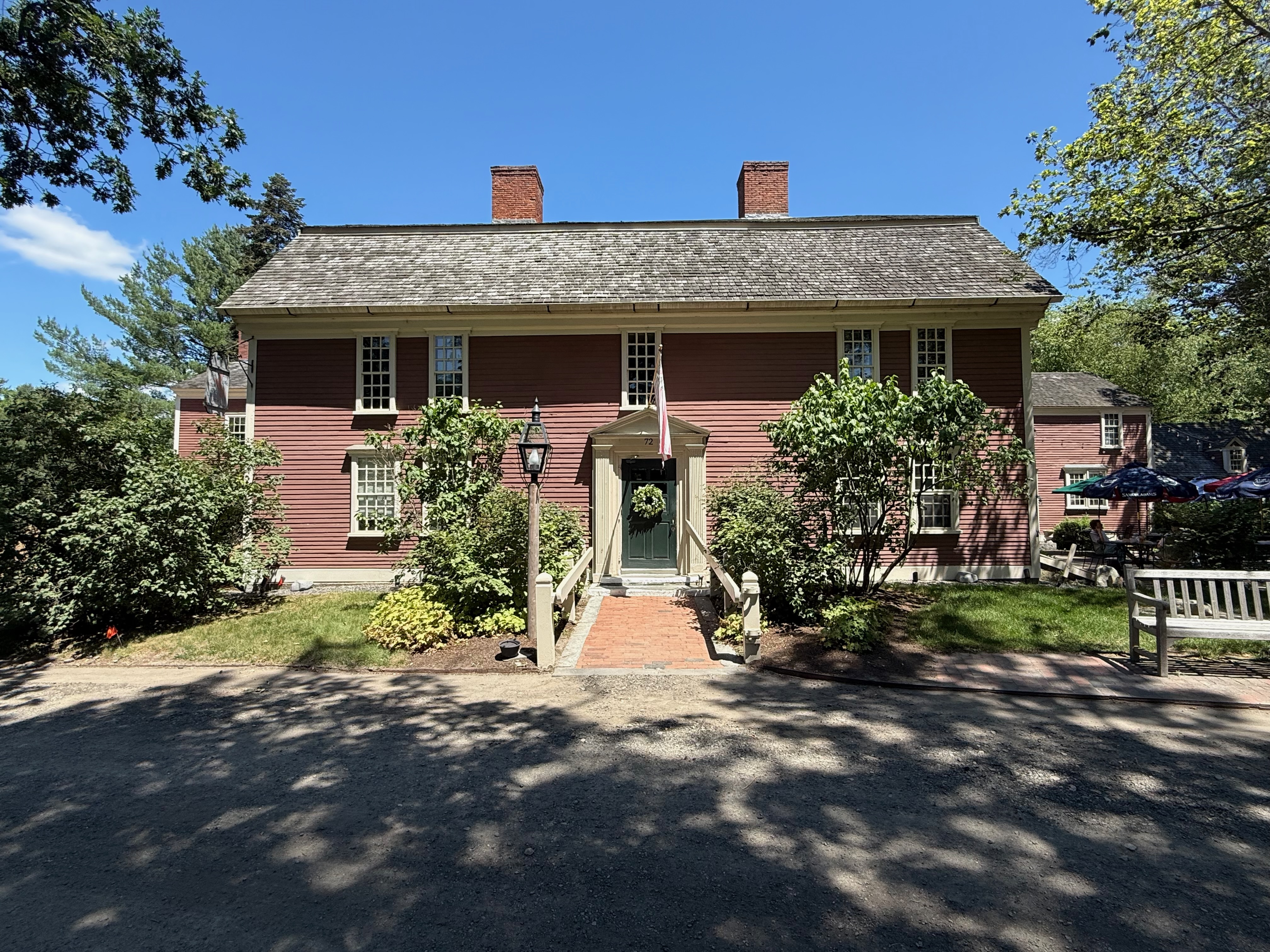
- The inn in 2025
- Interactive map of the The Wayside Inn area
- Former names: Howe's Tavern

General information
- Architectural style: American colonial
- Location: Sudbury, Massachusetts, U.S., 72 Wayside Inn Road; Sudbury, Massachusetts 01776
- Coordinates: 42°21′28″N 71°28′5″W
- Completed: 1686 (340 years ago)

Other information
- Parking: Yes

Website
- www.wayside.org

The Wayside Inn is a historic inn in Sudbury, Massachusetts, United States, included on the National Register of Historic Places as part of the listed Wayside Inn Historic District. It became an inn called Howe's Tavern in 1716, making it one of the oldest continuously operating inns in the United States.

The inn is managed by The Wayside Inn Foundation.

== History ==
The inn's archive has documents from 1686 onward, including the official inn license granted to innkeeper David Howe in 1716. His son Ezekiel was the next innkeeper, and he fought in the American Revolutionary War with the Sudbury Minutemen.

Two slaves are known to have lived at the inn: a man named "Portsmouth" and an unnamed girl were purchased in 1773 and 1779, respectively, by Ezekiel Howe.

Lyman Howe, a fifth-generation owner of the property, died unmarried and without children in 1861.

Poet Henry Wadsworth Longfellow visited the inn in 1862, with his publisher James T. Fields, shortly after it had become the Red Horse Tavern. He noted that it was "a rambling, tumble-down building, two hundred years old; and till now in the family of the Howes". He set his compilation of poems Tales of a Wayside Inn at this inn and originally considered titling it Sudbury Tales. The book was published in 1863 and presented as a series of stories told by several guests at the inn. It included the poem "Paul Revere's Ride" as "The Landlord's Tale".

In 1893, Homer Rogers and S. Herbert Howe took over ownership of the inn. Rogers was the first person outside of the Howe family to own the inn, which was built after King Philip's War. Howe and Rogers spent a considerable amount of money renovating and improving it. In 1897, the tavern was purchased by Edward R. Lemon, who again converted it into an inn.

Henry Ford was the last private owner of the inn. He purchased it in 1923 from Cora Lemon. The following year, he purchased 300 acres (1.2 km^{2}) surrounding the inn from John Duncan Pearmain, with the aim of developing it into a historically oriented village and museum. "He fell in love with it at first sight," said John W. Burke, the Ford family chauffeur of 42 years.

Ford's aims were not accomplished at the Wayside, but he did establish the non-profit institution that now operates the inn and associated museum, watermill, and archives. He also established the Wayside Inn Boys School, a trade school which operated from 1928 to 1947, aiming to demonstrate his belief that "the only way to really learn is by doing." Ford claimed to have invested $1,616,956.11 to the project. He sold the Wayside property in 1945, ultimately fulfilling his desires to create such a museum at Greenfield Village in Dearborn, Michigan.

The inn was gutted by a fire on the night of December 22 and 23, 1955, full of antiques collected by Ford in the 1920s. It was restored to the way that it had appeared when Longfellow stayed there using many original beams and pieces of furniture, with a $500,000 grant from the Ford Foundation. The inn re-opened June 7, 1958, with an open house and picnics on the lawn of the property's Martha-Mary Chapel and gristmill.

In 2019, the Inn's volunteer board of trustees took the name "The Wayside Inn Foundation," as they worked to develop more research and outreach for a property that includes the Inn and other historic buildings on its "over 100 acres of fields and forests." It is still in operation as a restaurant, offering historically accurate guest rooms and hosting for small receptions. A guest book was kept for many years, including observations of famous people who stayed or dined at the inn, entries written by the guests, and newspaper clippings for context.

Though The Wayside Inn is often noted as the oldest continuously operating inn in the United States, the Beekman Arms Inn and others make various similar claims and note The Wayside Inn's closure period of 1861–1897 after the death of Lyman Howe.

== Replica ==
Jesse Winburn built a replica of the inn in Rye, New York, in the late 1920s at the cost of $250,000. It was his final project before he died in 1929, aged 58.

== Gallery ==
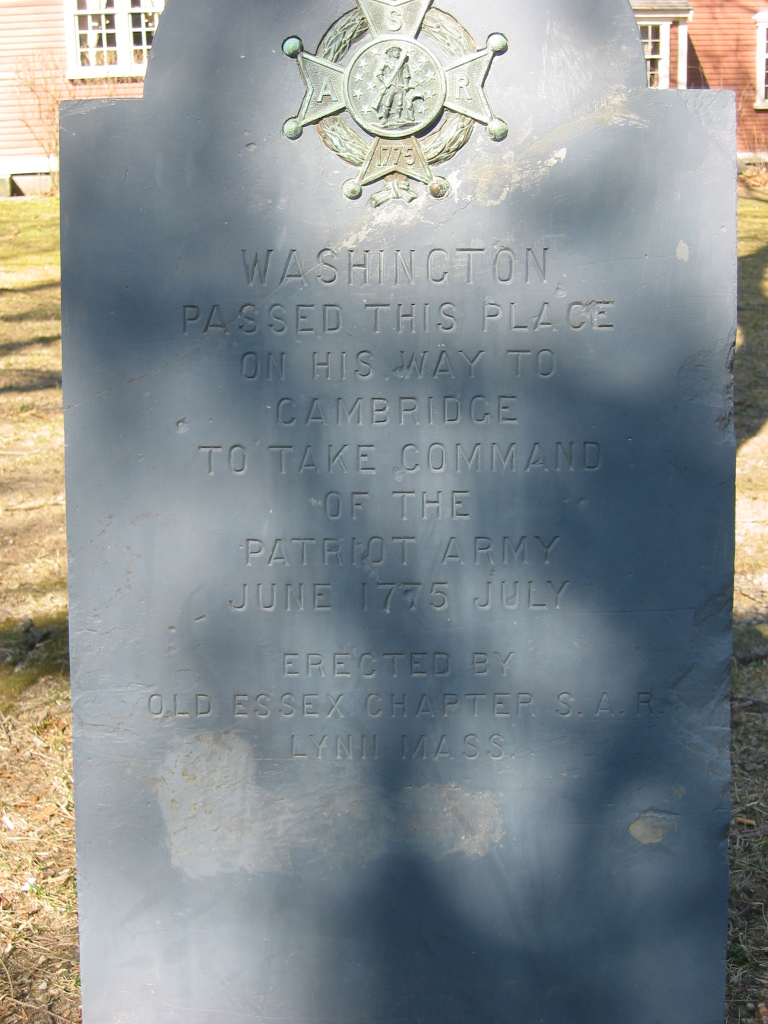
A marker announcing George Washington's passing through in 1775

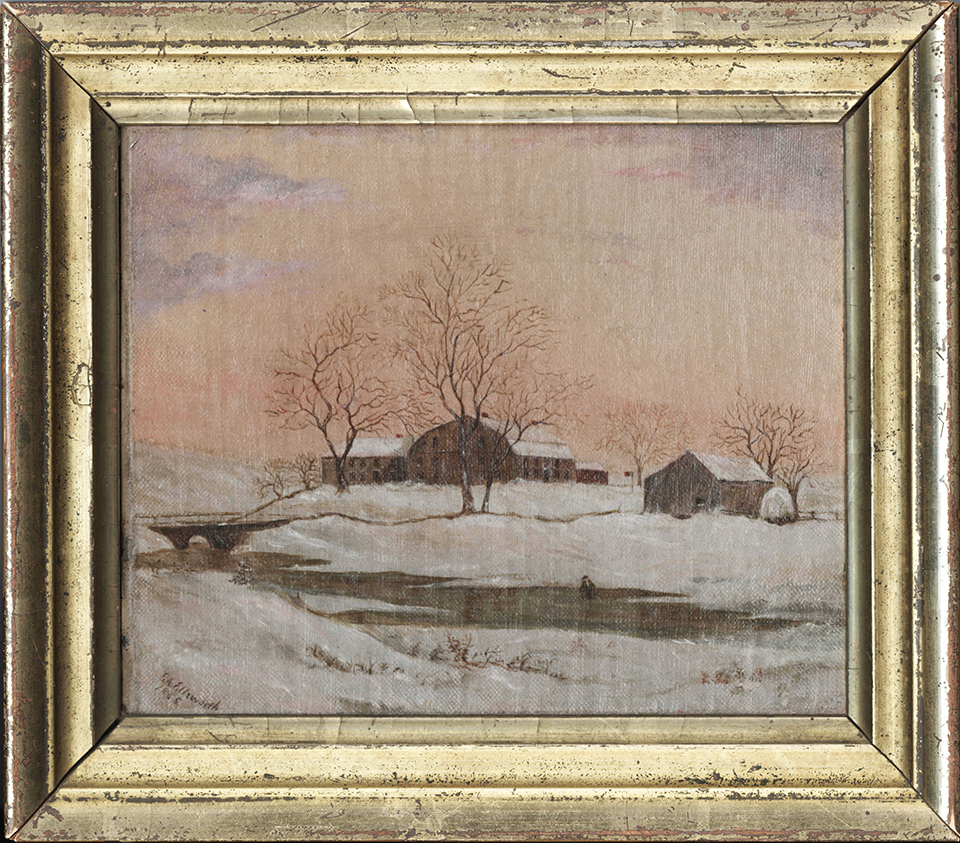
1865 oil painting of the inn

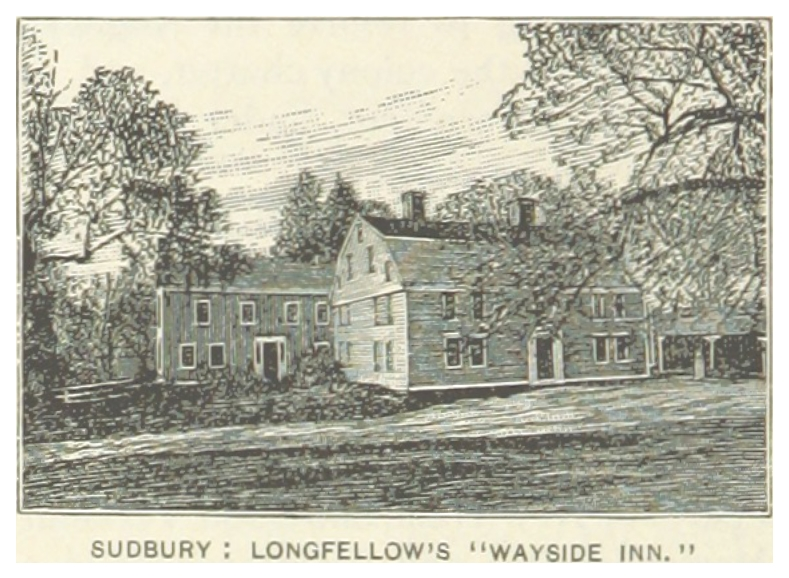
Scanned image from King's Hand-book of the United States (1891)

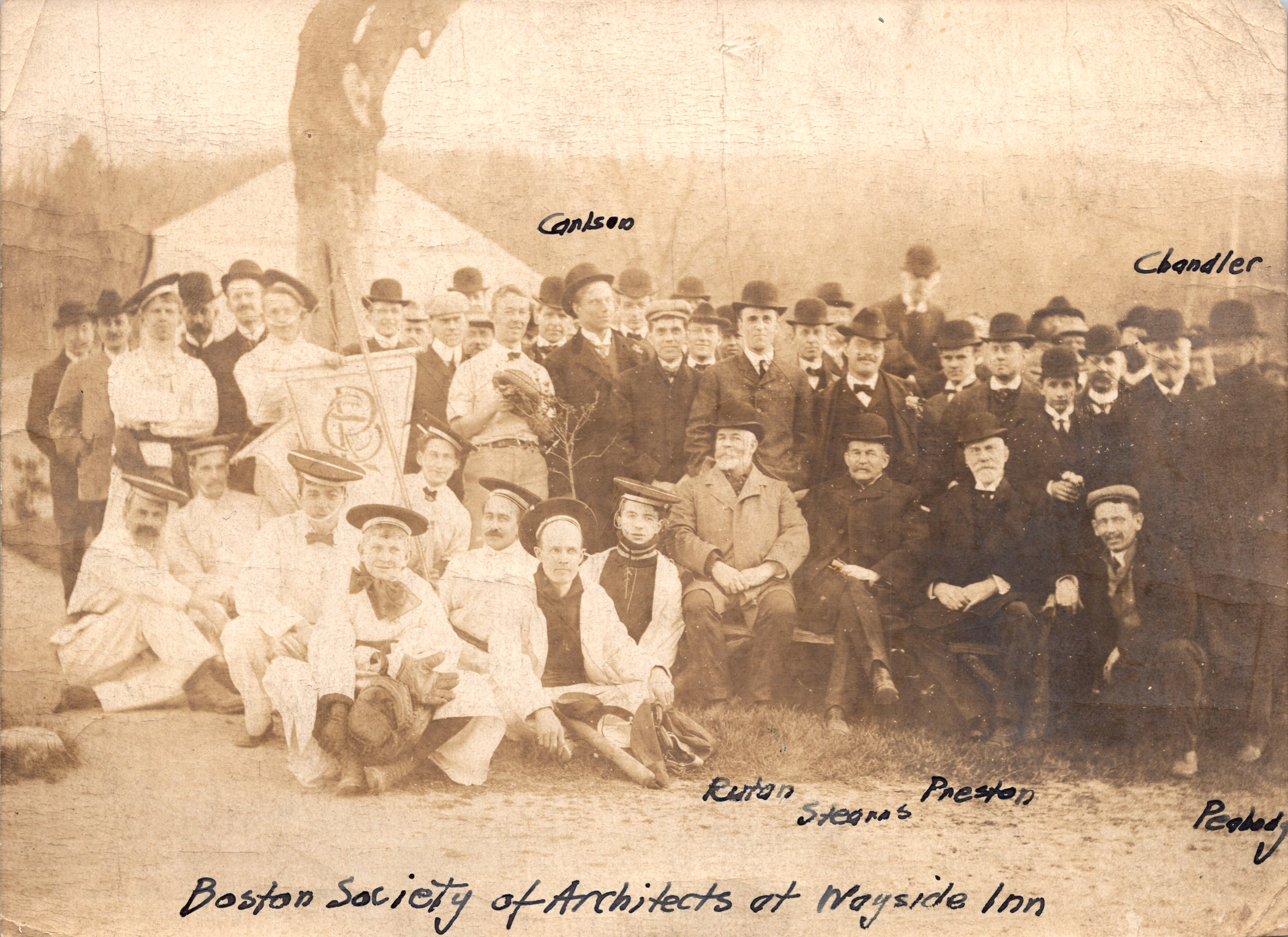
Boston Society of Architects meeting at the Wayside Inn (c. 1908)

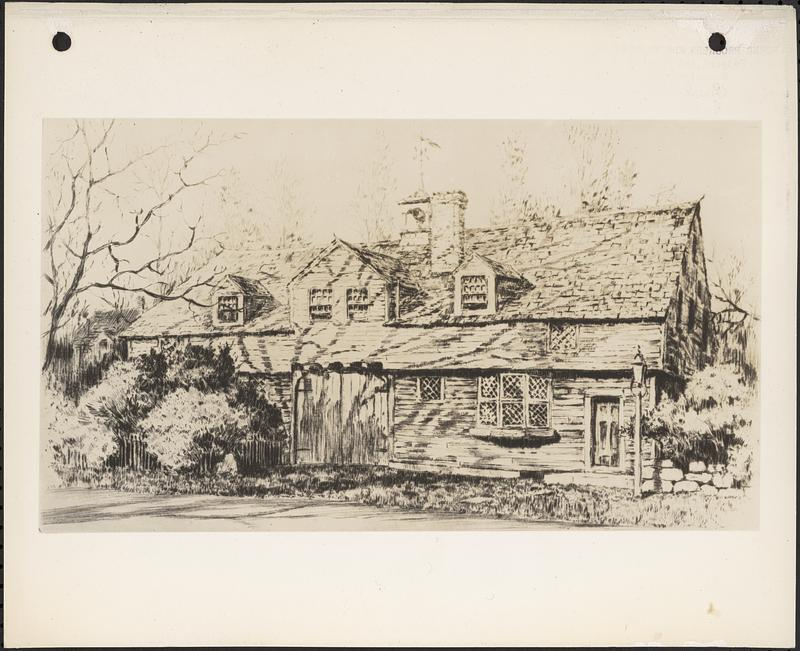
Wayside Inn coach house, drawn by WPA artist sometime between 1935 and 1943

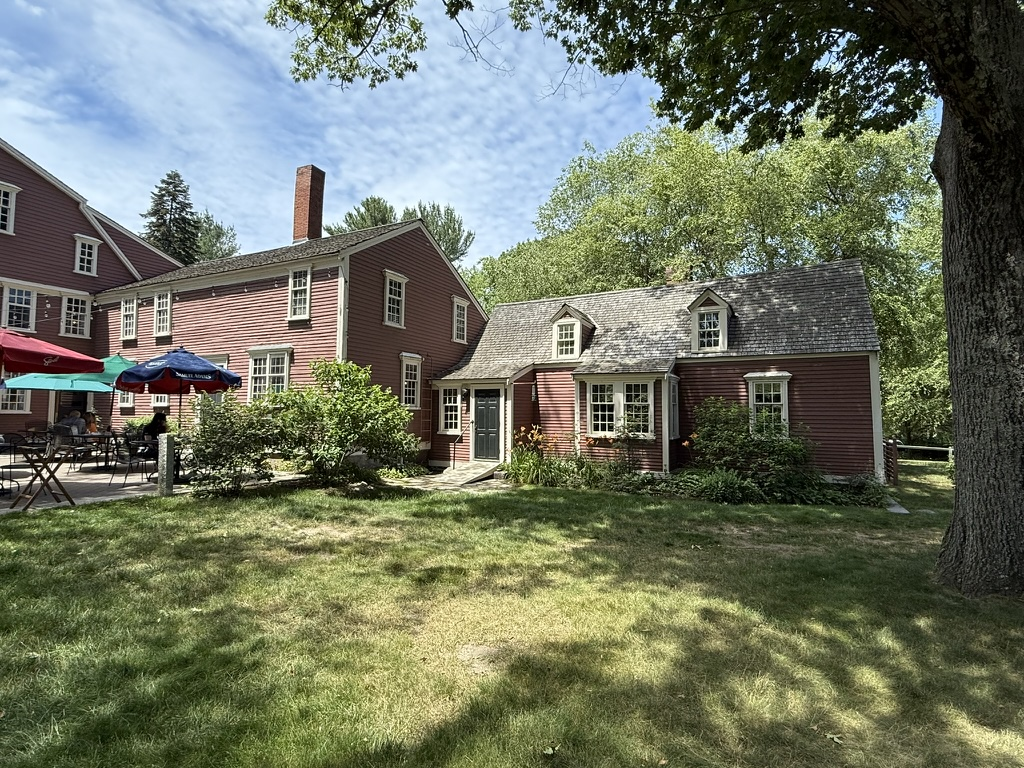
These buildings make up the wing on the eastern side of the inn

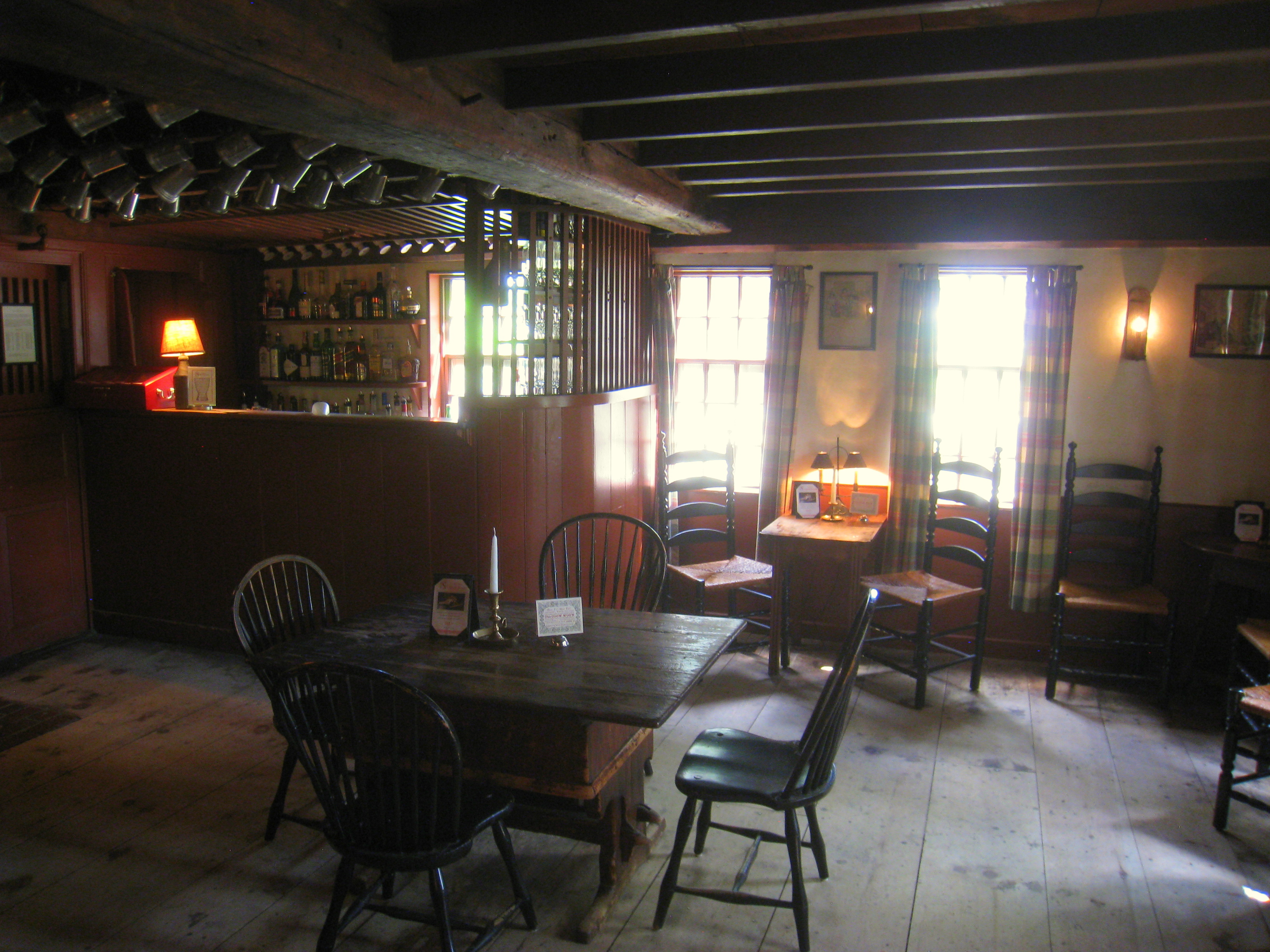
The inn's tavern

== See also ==
- National Register of Historic Places listings in Middlesex County, Massachusetts
- Coow Woow
