= George James Adams =

Textile Manufacturer and Copper Mine Operator

George James Adams (February 17, 1811 – January 17, 1888) was an American textile manufacturer and agent, as well as a copper mine operator, from Rhode Island. He purchased the freedom of Bethany Veney and her son, Joe, in 1858, and moved them north from Virginia to Providence, Rhode Island. Adams was an abolitionist, who supported The Liberator and was a member of city and state Anti-Slavery Societies.

== Early life ==
Born on February 17, 1811, in Bristol, Rhode Island, George James Adams was the son of Sarah Martindale and Captain James Harvey Adams (born 1775). His mother, born Sarah (Sally) M. W. Waldron, was married to Captain Adams in Bristol, Rhode Island in 1808. She was previously married to James Martindale of Bristol, Rhode Island. She died in 1834.

== Career ==
At some point in his career, he was employed at the Adams Print Works at Fiskeville, Rhode Island, the Kent Print Works in East Greenwich, the Clyde Bleaching and Print Works, and the Bristol Print Works.

Around 1836, Adams was an associate at the Arkwright Cotton Mills at Fiskeville. From 1848 to 1854, he was the chief agent at Narragansett Print Works in East Greenwich. From 1856 to 1882, he was treasurer of the Greenwich Print Works. From the 1860s to the 1870s, he worked at the Orion Cotton Mills in Providence. He was part-owner of the Rhode Island Beach and Dye Works, Adams and Butterworth, in Providence. Adams was a cotton broker.

In the 1850s, he and J. Butterworth were copper mining speculators, who reopened a mine near Stony Man Mountain.

In Virginia, he employed Bethany Veney, an African American enslaved woman, who was owned by David McCoy who needed to sell property to cover his gambling debts. After consulting with his wife and her sister Sarah, Adams purchased her and her son Joe on December 27, 1858, for $775 (equivalent to $28,839 in 2025) and freed them. They moved to Adam's house in Providence, where she was a domestic servant for a time. Veney was the author of the Aunt Betty's Story: The Narrative of Bethany Veney, A Slave Woman (1889).

== Abolitionist ==
Adams was an abolitionist who communicated with Thomas P. Richmond about the insurrection on the slave ship La Amistad in 1839 and slave uprisings. He was an officer and director of the Rhode Island Anti-Slavery Society and was a secretary of the Union Anti-Slavery Society in Fiskeville. He also supported The Liberator.

== Personal life ==
Adams married Mary Hodges Brown, who was born in 1814. They had three or more children, Sarah M., George H., and John B. Adams. Around 1865, Adams purchased the house at 10 Cushing Street in the College Hill Historic District in Providence. His wife Mary was ill in 1873 and Bethany Veney returned to the Adam's family to nurse her friend. Mary died that year after which Veney returned to Worcester. Adams married for a second time to Cornelia Dean, who was born in 1827 and died in 1900.

He had interests in ships, electricity, phrenology, epidemiology, animal magnetism, and mesmerism. Adams died at the age of 76 on January 17, 1888, in Rhode Island. He is also said to have died in 1889.

The George James Papers, containing personal and professional correspondence and other papers, are held at Brown University in Providence, Rhode Island.

== See also ==
- Hannah Adams, half-sister of Captain James Hervey Adams
