= Mary Tyler =

American purported nursery rhyme subject

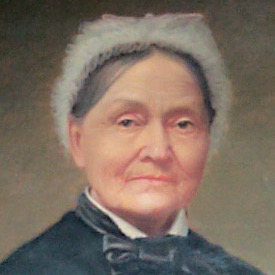
- Tyler pictured around 1880
- Born: Mary Elizabeth Sawyer; March 22, 1806; Sterling, Massachusetts, U.S.
- Died: December 11, 1889 (aged 83); Sterling, Massachusetts, U.S.
- Burial place: Mount Auburn Cemetery, Cambridge, Massachusetts, U.S.
- Spouse: Columbus Tyler (m. 1835; died 1881)

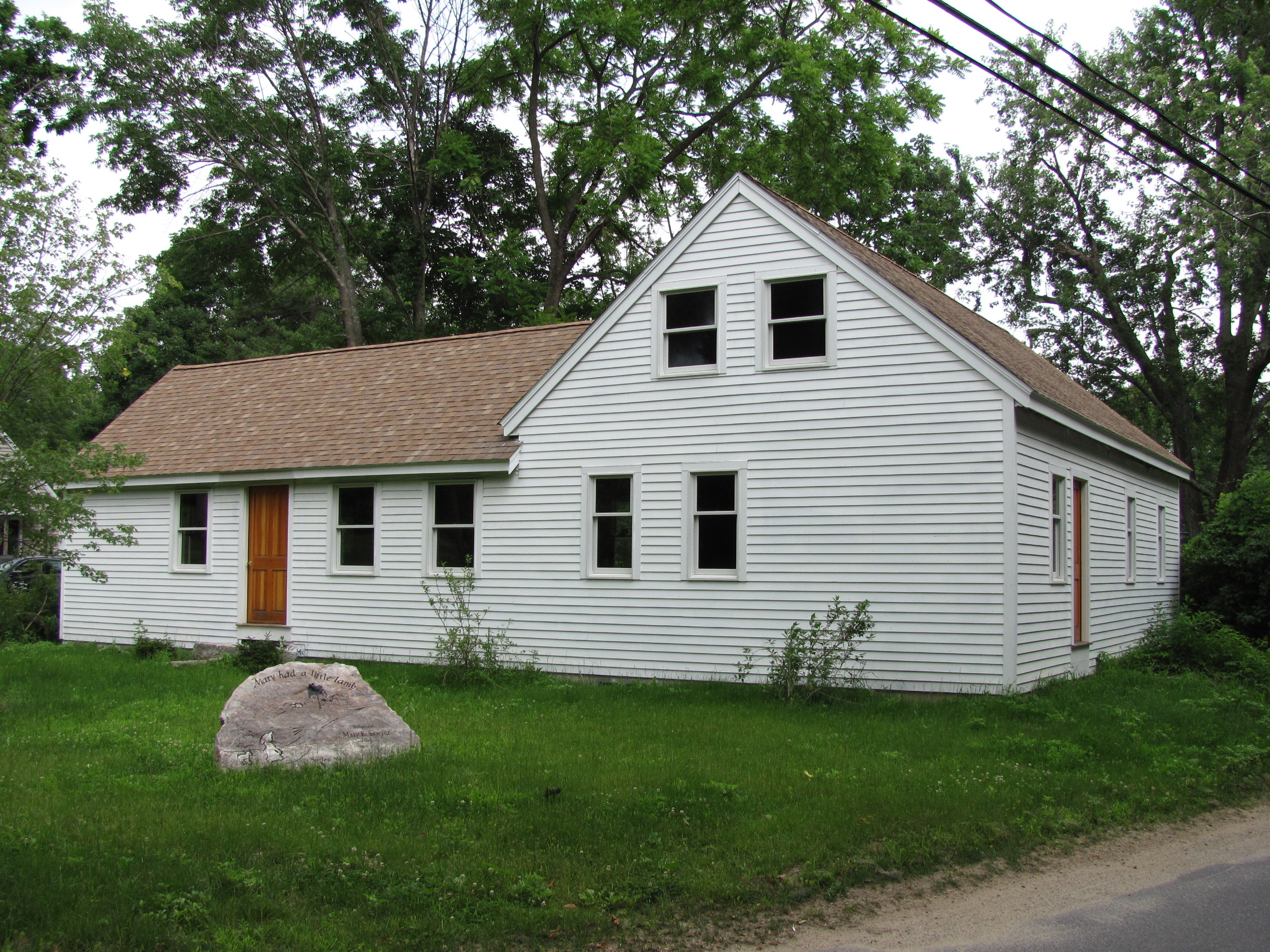
The rebuilt Sawyer Homestead in Sterling, Massachusetts, built in 1756

Mary Elizabeth Tyler (née Sawyer; March 22, 1806 – December 11, 1889) was an American woman from Sterling, Massachusetts, who is believed to have been the "Mary" on which the nursery rhyme "Mary Had a Little Lamb" was based, a claim she stated at the age of 70. The authorship of the nursery rhyme itself is also in doubt.

== Early life ==
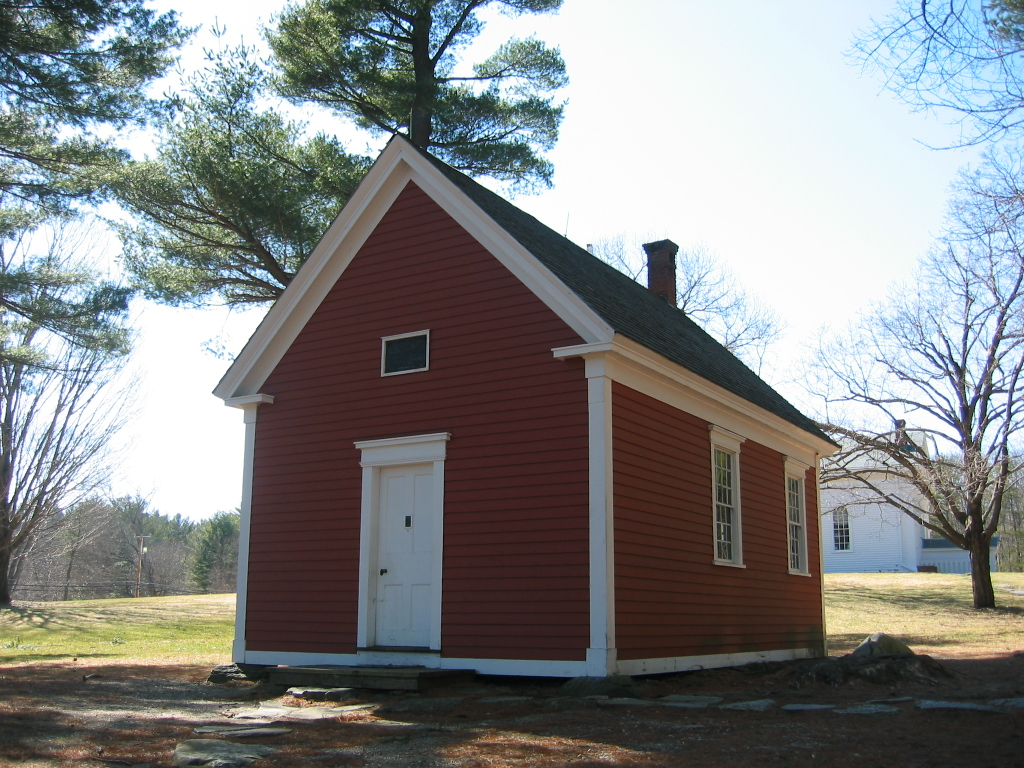
The Redstone School, which Tyler attended, is now located in Sudbury, Massachusetts

Mary Elizabeth Sawyer was born in 1806 on a farm in Sterling, Massachusetts, to Captain Thomas Sawyer and Elizabeth Houghton. She was the second daughter of their two known children. Her father died when Mary was 19 years old.

The family lived at 108 Maple Street in Sterling. As the Sawyer Homestead, it was listed on the National Register of Historic Places in 2000, but was destroyed by an arsonist in 2007.

As a young girl, Mary kept a pet lamb that she took to school one day at the suggestion of her brother. A commotion naturally ensued. Mary recalled, "Visiting school that morning was a young man by the name of John Roulstone; a nephew of the Reverend Lemuel Capen, who was then settled in Sterling. It was the custom then for students to prepare for college with ministers, and, for this purpose, Roulstone was studying with his uncle. The young man was very much pleased with the incident of the lamb, and, the next day, he rode across the fields on horseback, to the little old schoolhouse and handed me a slip of paper, which had written upon it the three original stanzas of the poem." A childhood friend, Fannie M. Dickerson, in 1902 published the earliest account of her recollections in Mary Had a Little Lamb: The True Story of the Real Mary and the Real Lamb (New York: Stokes, 1902). This account is not supported by evidence beyond Mary's memory. The "slip of paper" has never been produced as evidence. The earliest evidence of the poem's publication is Sarah Josepha Hale's 1830 collection of poems, supporting her complete authorship of the poem.

Even though this claim is unsupported by evidence, multiple sites in Sterling, Massachusetts, perpetuate the claim. A 2-foot (0.61 m) tall statue and historical marker representing "Mary's Little Lamb" stands in the town center. The Redstone School, where Mary attended school and purports the incident took place, was built in 1798. The property was later purchased by Henry Ford and relocated to a churchyard, on the property of Longfellow's Wayside Inn in Sudbury, Massachusetts. Mary Sawyer's house, located in Sterling, Massachusetts, was listed on the National Register of Historic Places in 2000, but was destroyed by arson on August 12, 2007.

== Personal life ==
Sawyer married Vermont native Columbus Tyler in 1835. He was steward of the McLean Asylum in Belmont, Massachusetts, for around forty years. Mary was a matron at the facility.

The couple, who built a large house in Somerville, Massachusetts, were founders of the city's First Unitarian Church, which was built in 1845.

Mary was a member of the Women's Christian Temperance Union and the Women's Relief Corps. She was also a founder of the Women's Industrial Exchange.

In 1876, at the age of 70, Tyler claimed that she was the "Mary" from the poem. The following year, Tyler was one of twenty women who helped save the Old South Meeting House in Boston by selling fleece from her pet lamb as attachments on autograph cards. The fleece had previously been made into a pair of socks by Mary's mother.

== Death ==
Tyler died in 1889, aged 83. She was interred in Mount Auburn Cemetery in Cambridge, Massachusetts, beside her husband, who predeceased her by eight years, aged 76.
