= Mary Tyler (disambiguation) =

Mary Tyler (1806–1889) was an American woman who is believed to have been the "Mary" on whom the nursery rhyme "Mary Had a Little Lamb" was based.

Mary Tyler may also refer to:

- Mary Tyler Ivins, real name of Molly Ivins (1944–2007), American newspaper columnist, author, and political commentator
- Mary Tyler Moore (1936–2017), American actress, producer, and social advocate
- Mary Tyler Peabody Mann (1806–1887), American teacher, author, and reformer
