= Sawyer Homestead (Sterling, Massachusetts) =

Historic house in Massachusetts, United States

- U.S. National Register of Historic Places
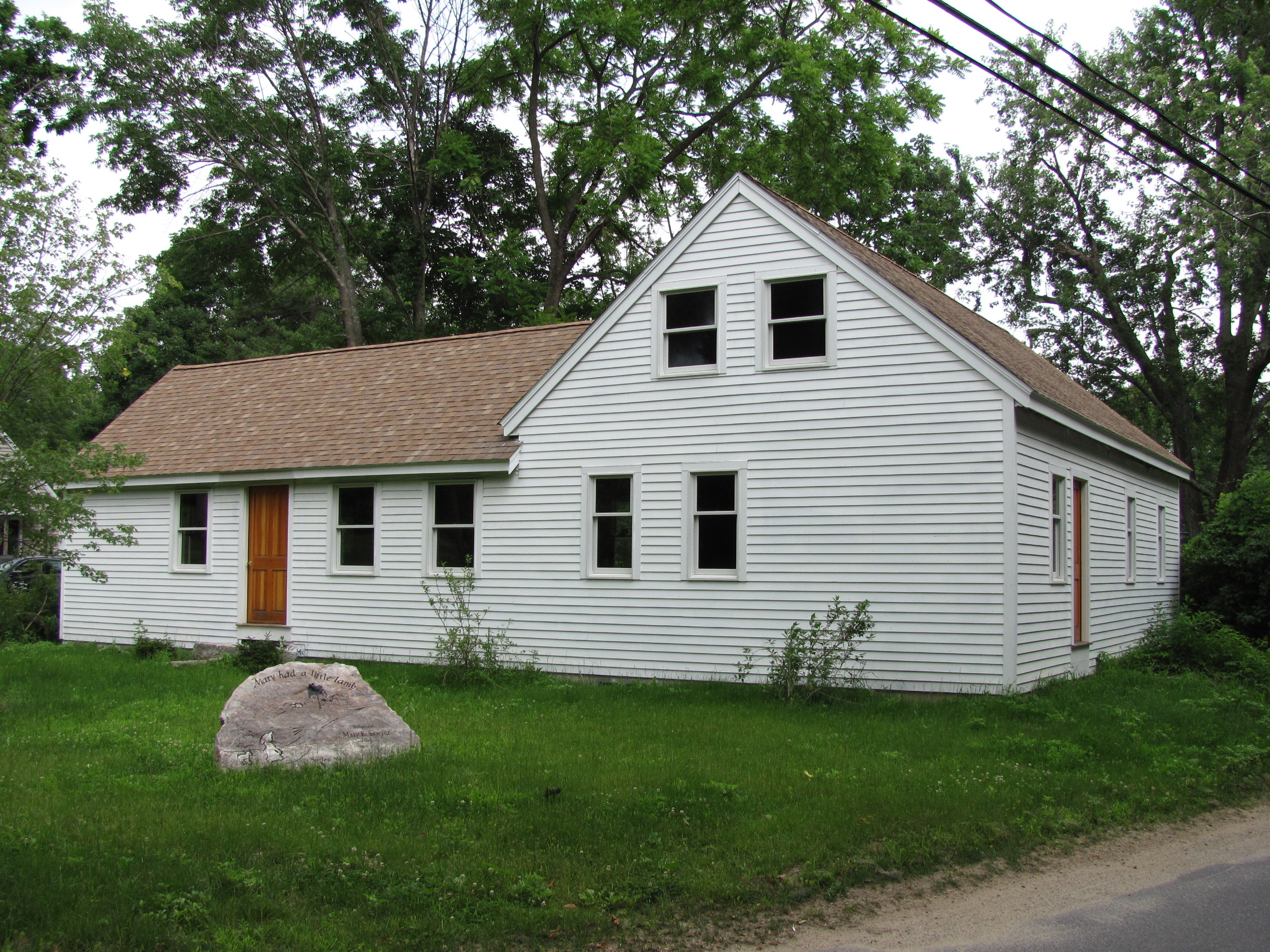
- A reconstruction of the Sawyer Homestead, photographed in 2010

- Location within Massachusetts Location within the United States
- Location: Sterling, Massachusetts
- Coordinates: 42°25′59″N 71°43′49″W
- Area: 33 acres (13 ha)
- Built: 1756
- Architectural style: Colonial, Early Republic
- NRHP reference No.: 00001036
- Added to NRHP: September 13, 2000

The Sawyer Homestead was a historic house at 108 Maple Street in Sterling, Massachusetts. With an estimated construction date of 1756, the house was one of Sterling's oldest surviving structures, before it was destroyed by an arsonist in 2007. It was also notable as the birthplace of Mary Sawyer, who alleged she was the subject of the American children's nursery rhyme "Mary Had a Little Lamb". The house was listed on the National Register of Historic Places in 2000. The Sawyer family, whose descendants still own the property, have had a reproduction of the house built on its site.

== Description and history ==
The Sawyer Homestead is located in rural eastern Sterling, at the junction of Maple Street and Rugg Road. It is a 1 1/2-story Cape style wood-frame structure, four bays wide, with an off-center interior chimney, clapboard siding, and a stone foundation. The main entrance is in the second bay from the left. A single-story gabled ell extends to the rear. The property included, prior to the rebuilding effort, an early 20th-century Federal Revival outbuilding, and a barn was located across Rugg Road. The barn was also destroyed by an arsonist, in 1979.

The original house had a complex evolutionary construction history, dictated by the changing demands of the Sawyer family, who occupied the house for more than 250 years. The traditional historical claim is that the core of the house was built in 1756 by Ezra Sawyer, Jr., who died while serving in the American Revolutionary War. Sawyer's granddaughter Mary is believed to be the girl described in the nursery rhyme "Mary Had a Little Lamb," attributed to Sarah Josepha Hale. Sawyers lived in the house until 1889, and owned it and the surrounding farmland for most of that time as well. The property then stood vacant and deteriorating, but remained the property of a Sawyer family trust. It was destroyed by an arsonist on August 12, 2007. The family then decided to recreate the house, beginning construction in 2008.

== See also ==
- National Register of Historic Places listings in Worcester County, Massachusetts
