= Wayside Inn Historic District =

Historic district in Massachusetts, United States

- U.S. National Register of Historic Places
- U.S. Historic district
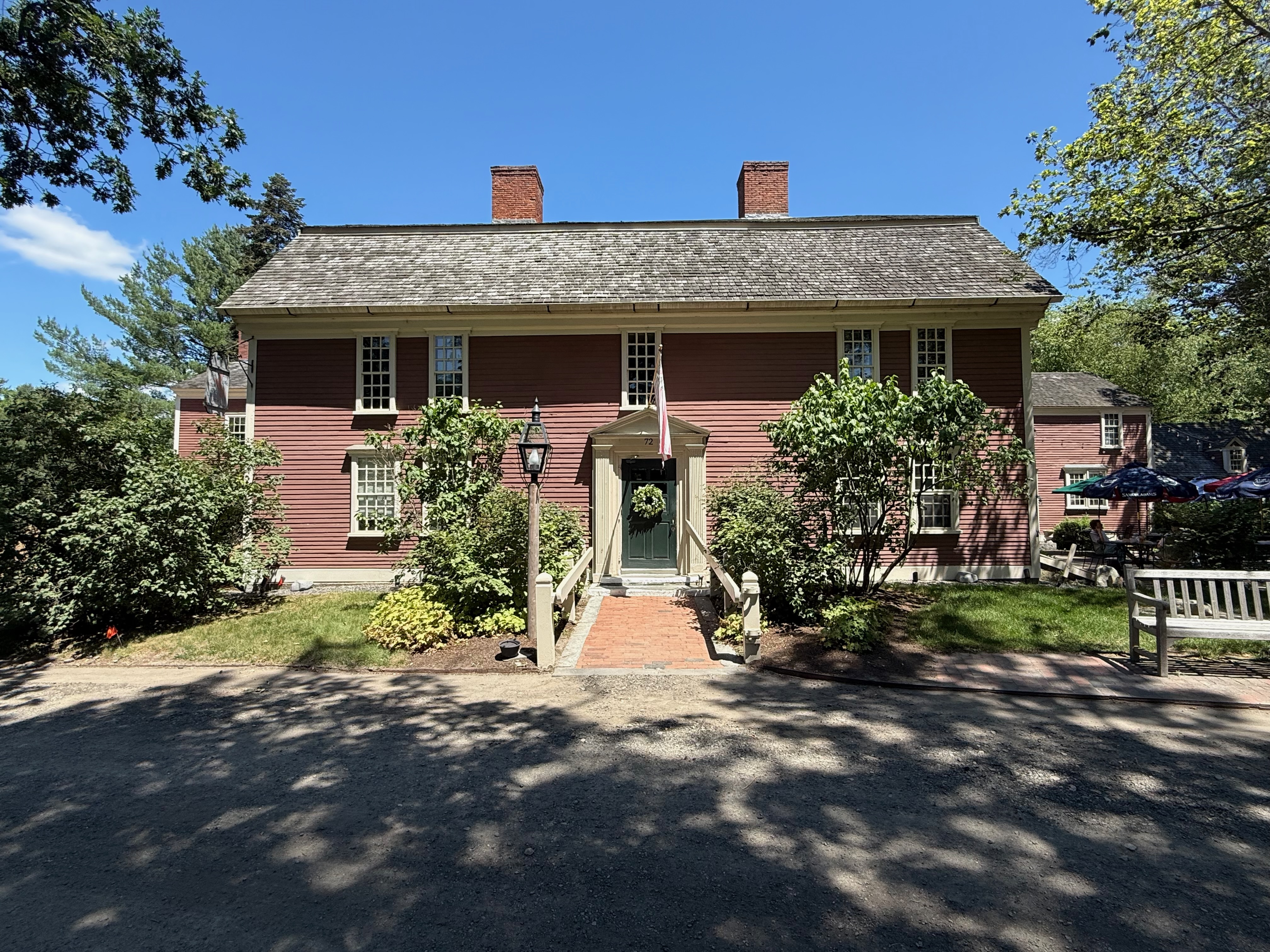
- The Wayside Inn in 2025

- Location within Massachusetts Location within the United States
- Location: Sudbury, Massachusetts
- Coordinates: 42°21′28″N 71°28′5″W
- Built: 1686
- Architect: Multiple
- Architectural style: Greek Revival, Colonial
- NRHP reference No.: 73000307
- Added to NRHP: April 23, 1973

The Wayside Inn Historic District is a historic district on Old Boston Post Road in Sudbury, Massachusetts. The district contains nine heritage buildings, including the Wayside Inn, a historic landmark that is one of the oldest inns in the country, operating as Howe's Tavern in 1716. The district features Greek Revival and American colonial architecture. The area was added to the National Register of Historic Places in 1973.

== Other structures ==
Henry Ford built a replica and fully working grist mill and a white non-denominational chapel, named after his mother, Mary, and mother-in-law, Martha. Less well known is Ford's attempt to create a reservoir for the Wayside Inn. Across US Route 20 and now secluded in a wooded area behind private homes is a 30-foot (9.1 m)-high stone dam. Dubbed by the locals as "Ford's Folly", the structure failed to retain water because the feeding brook provided insufficient volume and the ground was too porous for a pond to fill.

In the grounds of the chapel stands the Redstone School, a one-room schoolhouse which was moved from its original location in Sterling, Massachusetts, by Ford, who believed the building was the actual schoolhouse mentioned in Sarah Josepha Hale's poem "Mary Had a Little Lamb" and includes a bronze statue of a lamb driving a Model T.

The Mass Central Rail Trail—Wayside is a 23-mile (37 km) Massachusetts state park forming the northeastern border of the district; the "Wayside" name was selected as the Wayside Inn Railroad Waiting Room was a B&M station at the crossing with Dutton Road.

== Gallery ==
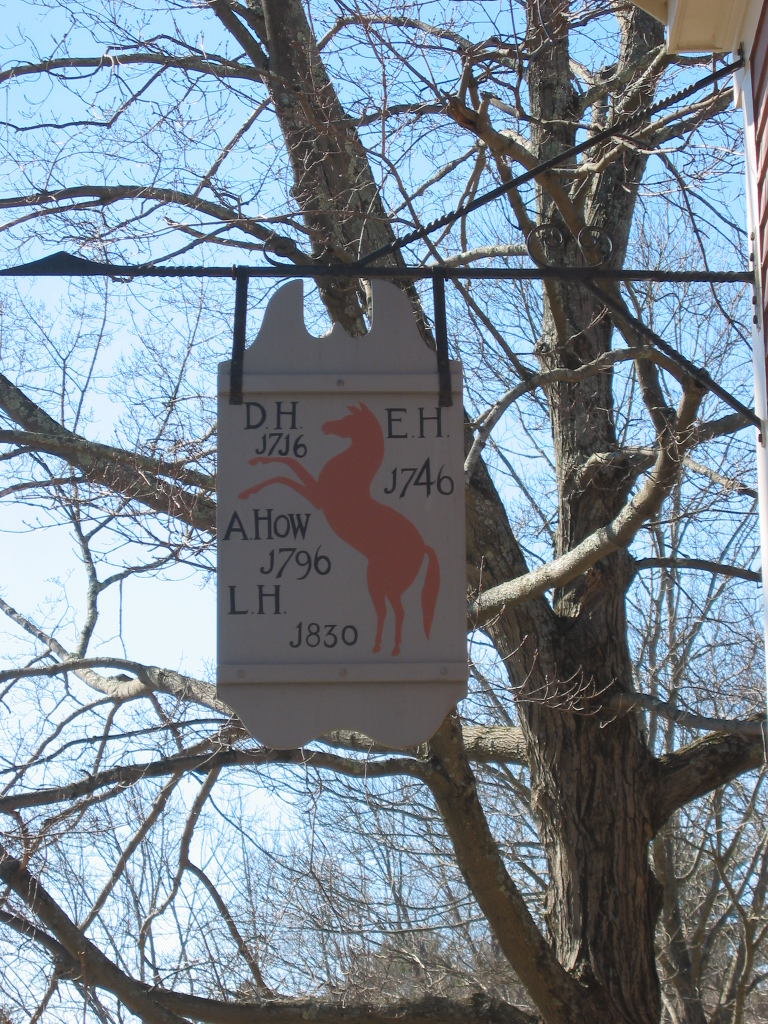
Sign with initials of previous owners of the inn

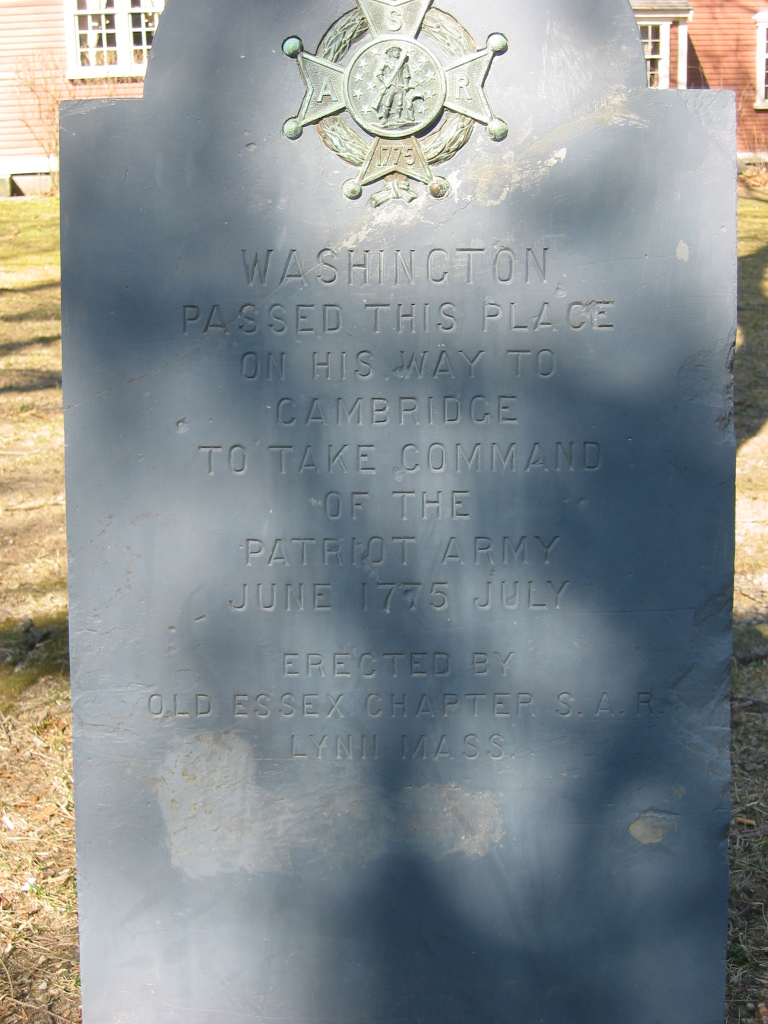
A marker announcing George Washington's passing through in 1775

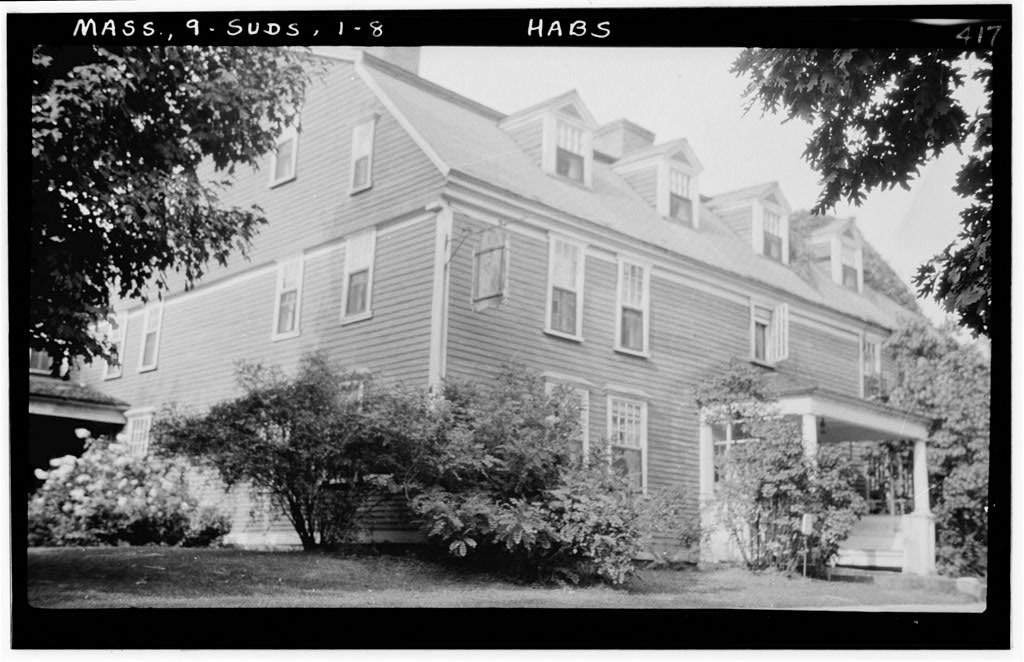
The Wayside Inn, c. 1935

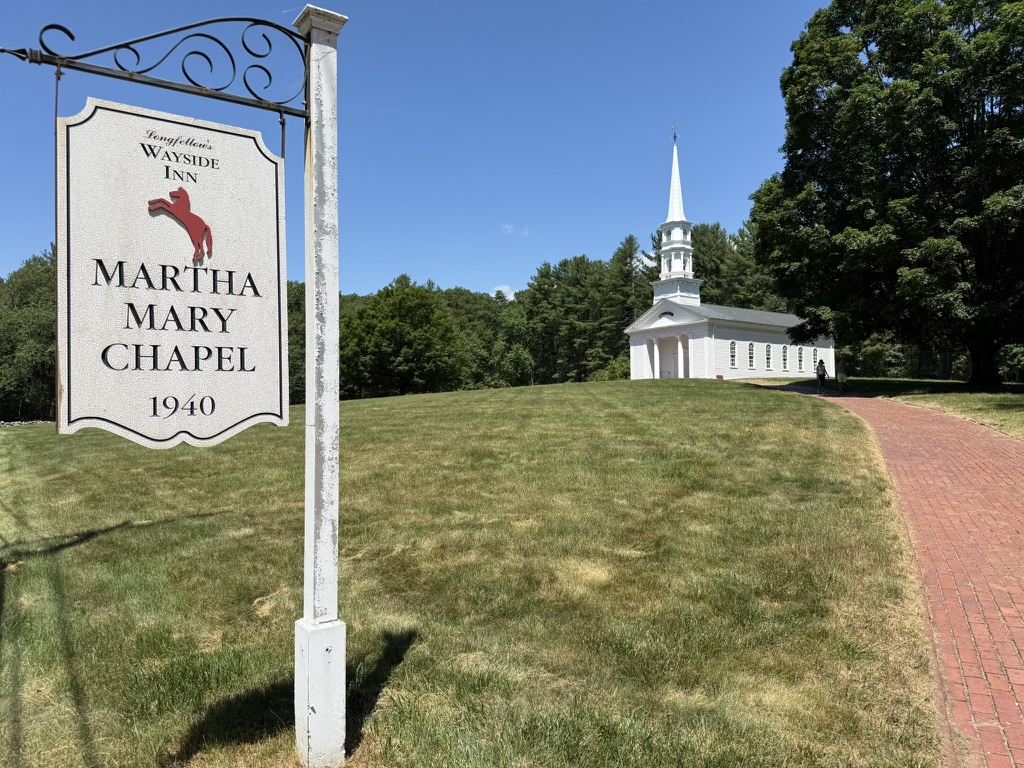
Martha Mary Chapel

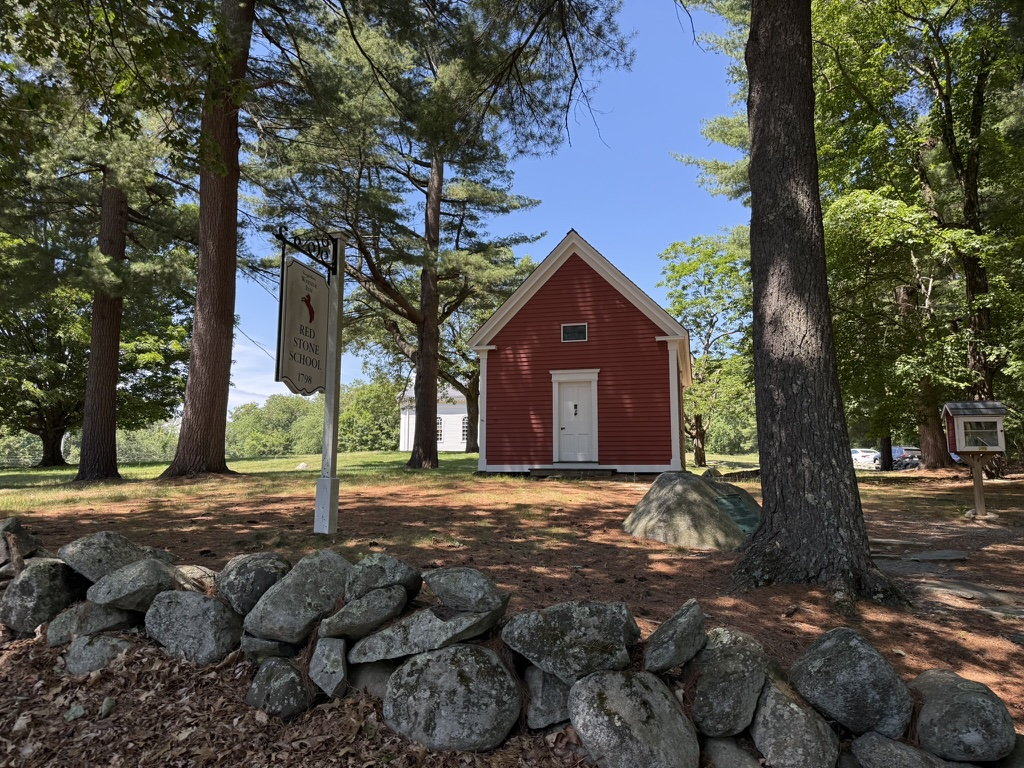
Redstone School, with the chapel behind

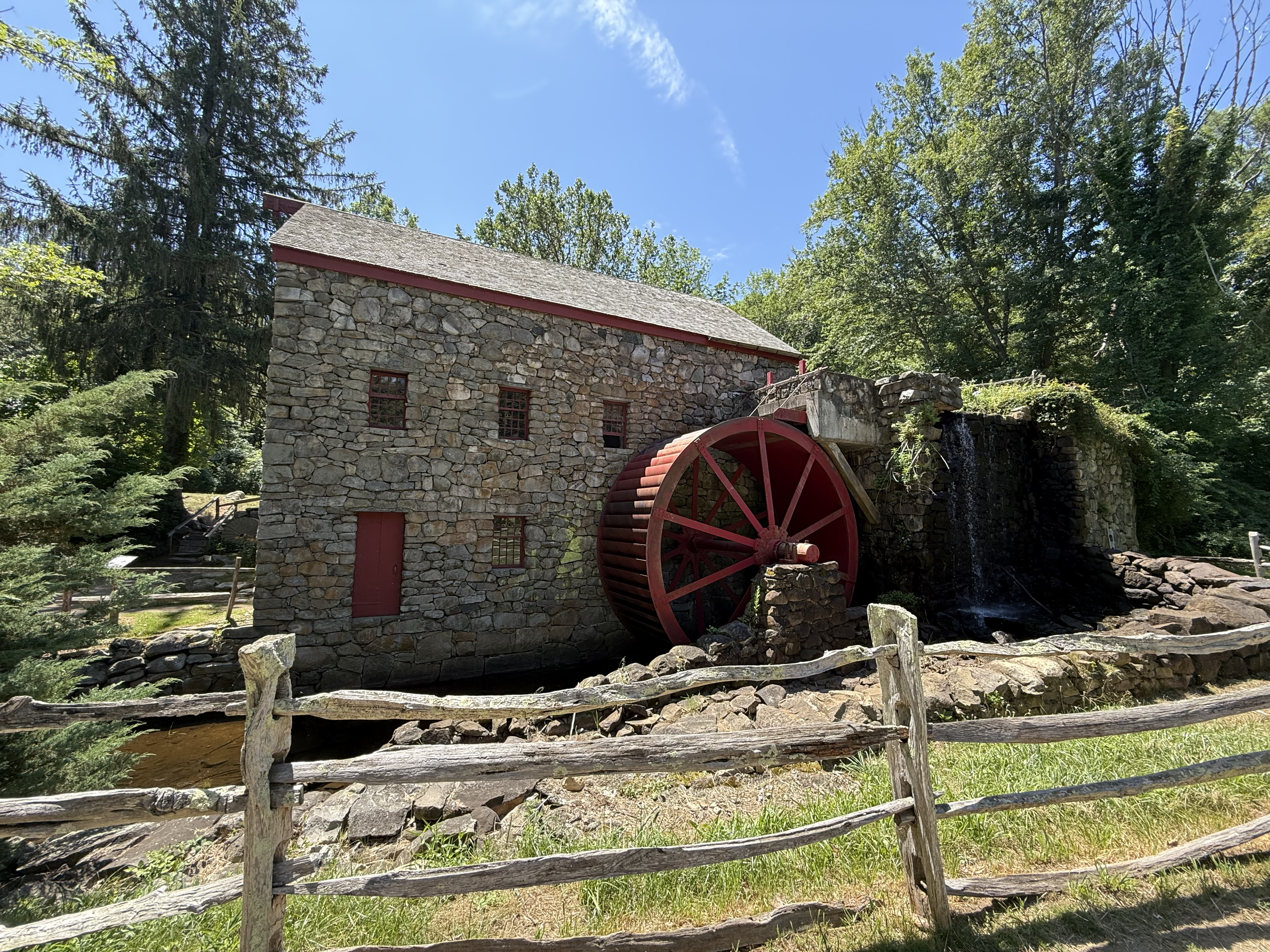
The inn's grist mill

== See also ==
- National Register of Historic Places listings in Middlesex County, Massachusetts
- Coow Woow
