= Mary Had a Little Lamb =

Nursery rhyme

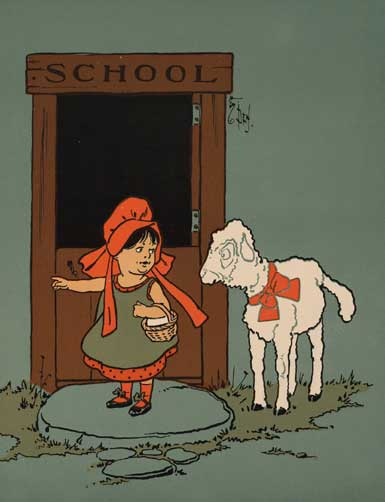
- Illustration by William Wallace Denslow (1902)

Nursery rhyme
- Songwriters: Sarah Josepha Hale, John Roulstone

"Mary Had a Little Lamb" is an English-language nursery rhyme of nineteenth-century American origin, first published by American writer Sarah Josepha Hale in 1830. Its Roud Folk Song Index number is 7622.

== Background ==
The nursery rhyme was first published by the Boston publishing firm Marsh, Capen & Lyon, as a poem by Sarah Josepha Hale on May 24, 1830, and was possibly inspired by an actual incident. As described in one of Hale's biographies:

Sarah began teaching young boys and girls in a small school not far from her home [in Newport, New Hampshire] ... It was at this small school that the incident involving 'Mary's Lamb' is reputed to have taken place. Sarah was surprised one morning to see one of her students, a girl named Mary, enter the classroom followed by her pet lamb. The visitor was far too distracting to be permitted to remain in the building and so Sarah 'turned him out.' The lamb stayed nearby till school was dismissed and then ran up to Mary looking for attention and protection. The other youngsters wanted to know why the lamb loved Mary so much and their teacher explained it was because Mary loved her pet. Then Sarah used the incident to get a moral across to the class:

Why does the lamb love Mary so?
Mary so, Mary so?

Why does the lamb love Mary so?
The eager children smiled,

Mary loves the lamb, you know,
Lamb, you know, lamb, you know,

Mary loves the lamb, you know
The teacher’s happy smile.

== Authorship controversy ==
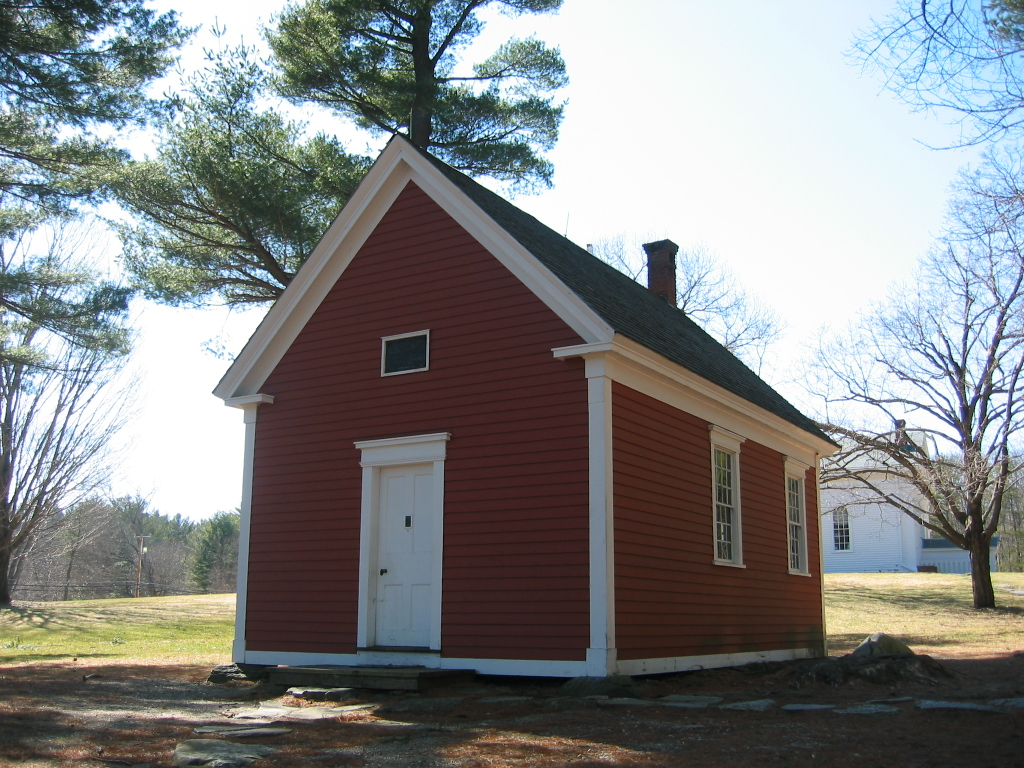
The Redstone School (1798), now in Sudbury, Massachusetts, is the schoolhouse Mary Tyler attended.

In 1876, at the age of 70, Mary Tyler emerged to claim that she was the "Mary" from the poem. As a young girl, Mary kept a pet lamb that she took to school one day at the suggestion of her brother. A commotion naturally ensued. Mary recalled, "Visiting school that morning was a young man by the name of John Roulstone; a nephew of the Reverend Lemuel Capen, who was then settled in Sterling, Massachusetts. It was the custom then for students to prepare for college with ministers, and, for this purpose, Roulstone was studying with his uncle. The young man was very much pleased with the incident of the lamb, and, the next day, he rode across the fields on horseback, to the little old schoolhouse and handed me a slip of paper, which had written upon it the three original stanzas of the poem." This account is not supported by evidence beyond Mary's memory. The "slip of paper" has never been produced as evidence. The earliest evidence of the poem's publication is Sarah Josepha Hale's 1830 collection of poems, supporting her complete authorship of the poem.

Even though this claim is unsupported by evidence, multiple sites in Sterling, Massachusetts, perpetuate the claim. A 2-foot (0.61 m) tall statue and historical marker representing Mary's Little Lamb stands in the town center. The Redstone School, where Mary Sawyer attended school and purports the incident took place, was built in 1798. The property was later purchased by Henry Ford and relocated to a churchyard, on the property of Longfellow's Wayside Inn in Sudbury, Massachusetts. Mary Sawyer's house, located in Sterling, Massachusetts, was listed on the National Register of Historic Places in 2000, but was destroyed by arson on August 12, 2007.

== Text ==
The text as originally published consisted of three stanzas, each of eight lines, although the ABAB rhyme scheme (ABCB in the first four lines) allows each stanza to be divided into two four-line parts.

MARY’S LAMB.

Mary had a little lamb,
Its fleece was white as snow.
And everywhere that Mary went,
The lamb was sure to go.
He followed her to school one day,
That was against the rule.
It made the children laugh and play
To see a lamb at school.

And so the teacher turned him out,
But still he lingered near,
And waited patiently about
Till Mary did appear.
And then he ran to her, and laid
His head upon her arm,
As if he said ‘I’m not afraid,
You’ll keep me from all harm.’

‘What makes the lamb love Mary so?’
The eager children cry.
‘Oh, Mary loves the lamb, you know,’
The teacher did reply.
‘And you each gentle animal
In confidence may bind,
And make them follow at your call,
If you are always kind.’

In the 1830s, Lowell Mason set the nursery rhyme to a melody. However, Mason's version is not the one commonly sung today. Today, it is commonly sung to the same tune as "Merrily We Roll Along" (the chorus of "Goodnight, Ladies") with repetition in the verses:

Mary had a little lamb,
Little lamb, little lamb.
Mary had a little lamb,
Its fleece was white as snow.

And everywhere that Mary went,
Mary went, Mary went,
Everywhere that Mary went,
The lamb was sure to go.

It followed her to school one day,
School one day, school one day.
It followed her to school one day,
Which was against the rules.

It made the children laugh and play,
Laugh and play, laugh and play.
It made the children laugh and play
To see a lamb at school.

"Why does the lamb love Mary so?
Mary so, Mary so?
Why does the lamb love Mary so?"
The eager children cry.

"Why, Mary loves the lamb, you know,
Lamb, you know, lamb, you know,
Mary loves the lamb, you know,"
The teacher did reply.

== Recordings ==
The rhyme was the first audio recorded by Thomas Edison on his newly invented phonograph in 1877. It was the first instance of recorded English verse, following the recording of the French folk song "Au clair de la lune" by Édouard-Léon Scott de Martinville in 1860. In 1927, Edison reenacted the recording, which still survives. The earliest recording (1878) was retrieved by 3D imaging equipment in 2012.

Buddy Guy recorded a blues-version of this song for his album A Man and the Blues in 1968. Paul McCartney and Wings made a record hit of the rhyme in 1972. A cover of Buddy Guy's blues variation of this song was also performed by Stevie Ray Vaughan for his album Texas Flood in 1983.

== Media ==
Male singing the first verses of "Mary Had a Little Lamb".

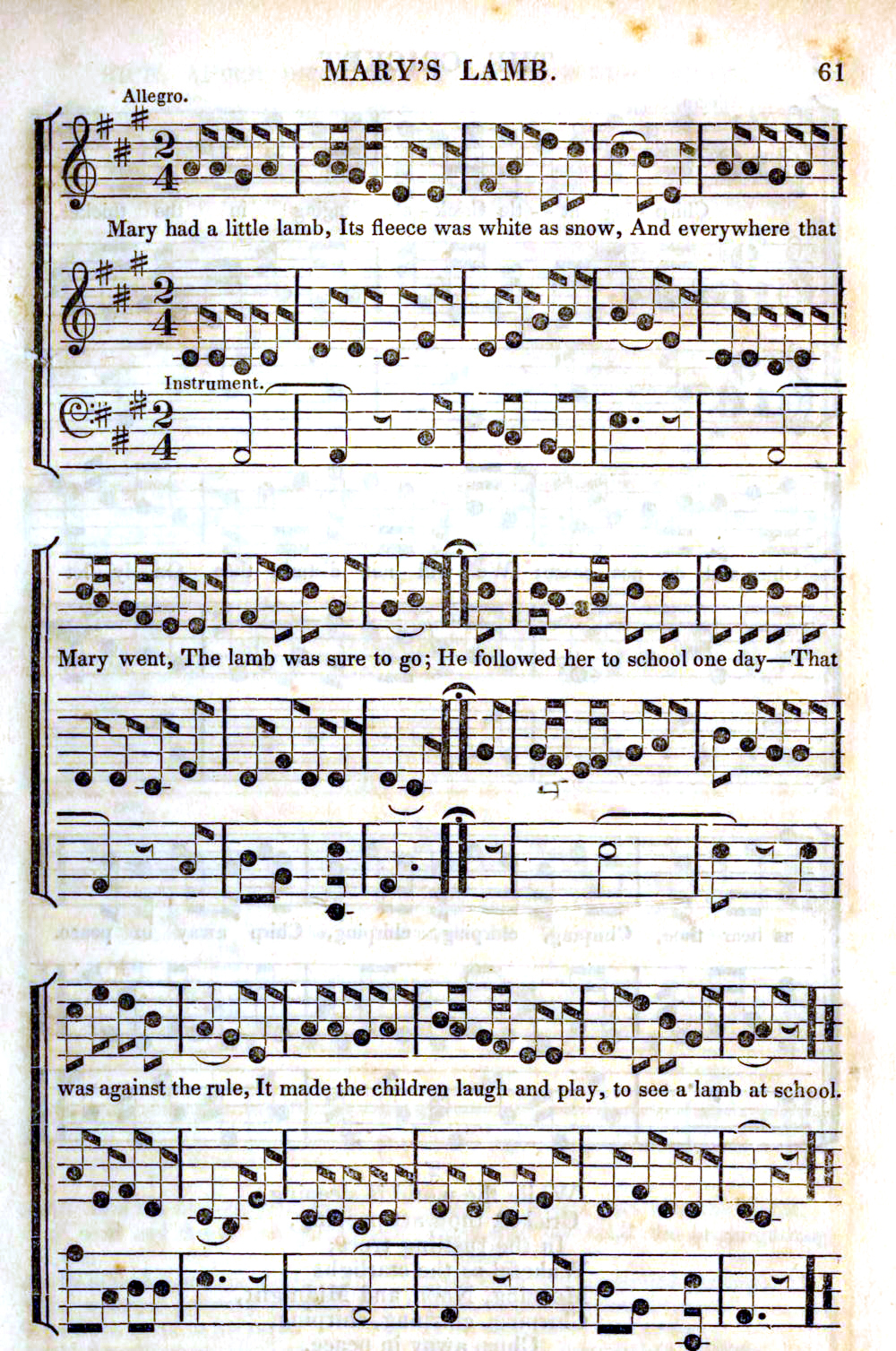
Lowell Mason's musical setting of the poem, published in 1831.

Lowell Mason's 1831 musical setting, which has since fallen out of use.

== See also ==
- List of nursery rhymes
