= Sterling Camp Meeting Grounds =

Coordinates: 42°24′25″N 71°45′43″W

The Sterling Camp Meeting Grounds, also known at the Worcester Methodist District Camp was a Methodist camp ground founded in 1852 that was located south of the East and West Waushacum Ponds and two miles south of Sterling, Massachusetts. The 14-mile Fitchburg and Worcester Rail Line brought visitors to Sterling Junction, which was a short walk to the Sterling Camp Meeting Grounds. The Boston and Maine Railroad brought people from Boston, Lowell, and Cambridge for the one week to 10-day retreats. More than 1,000 people attended the summer revivals from all over the state of Massachusetts. The site had a number of amenities for lodging, meals, and services.

== Background ==
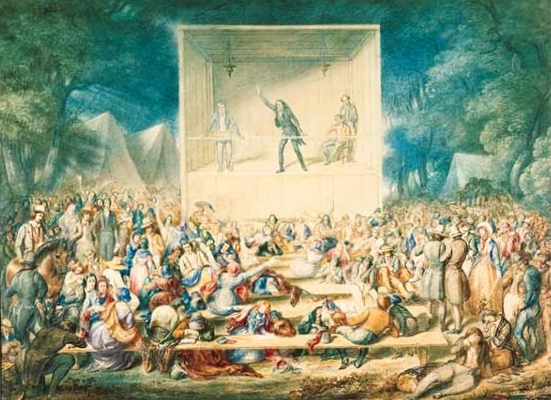
Methodist Episcopal Church camp meeting, 1839. Methodist preachers are known for promulgating the doctrines of the new birth and entire sanctification to the public at events such as tent revivals and camp meetings, which they believe is the reason that God raised them up into existence.

The concept of camp meetings began on the western frontier, and the Methodists brought them to the eastern side of the United States. At Methodist camp meetings, which continue to occur today:

... both the Eucharist and Love Feast were celebrated. But the focus of the camp meeting was on preaching of the "way of salvation," and the physical layout of the camp meeting assembly area came to be a sacred space representing the stages on the way of salvation. The altar rail, originated the point for receiving Holy Communion, came to represent the surrender of oneself in conversion and entire sanctification. The "mourner's bench" (or "anxious bench," as it was decried by the theologians of the Mercersburg movement) was placed in front of the altar rail and represented the experience of spiritual "awakening" that typically preceded conversion in understanding of the "way of salvation." In a weekend format, one might expect a sermon on sin, awakening and repentance on Friday, sermons on conversion and assurance on Saturday, and preaching on sanctification (including entire sanctification) on Sunday.

The first Methodist revival camp was held in Haddam, Connecticut in 1802. The Methodist movement (the Second Great Awakening of the 19th century) was progressive regarding the role of women in the church and slavery. The Methodists encouraged membership of the working poor in their churches. A fundamental belief was that all people could be saved, regardless of their sins or backgrounds. Methodist preachers are known for promulgating the doctrines of the new birth and entire sanctification to the public at events such as tent revivals and camp meetings, which they believe is the reason that God raised them up into existence.

During camp meetings there were nearly continuous services. Rev. Sarah Mount described what the religious revival camps of the 19th century and early 20th century were like:

Imagine traveling to a lovely three-acre grove of trees, cleared of all underbrush, where tents for sleeping are standing in an oblong square, or a circle. Behind the tents are carriages, wagons and tethered horses. Cooking fires are placed just outside the tent flaps. In the center of the tents, there is a stage in front of a semicircle of benches, one section for the women and another for the men. At night this tent ground is illuminated by candles.

== History ==
The land was first leased and then purchased from a local farmer, John Gates. Visitors initially camped in tents, but later the camp grounds offered a number of amenities, including a community hall, tabernacle, cabins, restaurant, bakery, and a store. The retreats operated from 1852 until 1946, according to the Sterling Town Hall. They were held in the summer over a seven to ten day period, with people arriving from all over Massachusetts. During that time, the Boston and Maine Railroad added extra trains from Boston, Lowell, and Cambridge to Sterling Junction. More than 1,000 people attended the camp meetings. Each day there were three sermons and afterwards there were prayer meetings. Churches from around the state closed down during the retreats and operated out of 60 tents at the camp ground. Visitors, sometimes as many as 29 in a day, were converted.

In 1914, a fire believed to have been caused by an overturned kerosene lantern, which was fanned by strong winds, destroyed a hotel, 40 cottages, 50 frame buildings, and several small churches. In 1938, a hurricane destroyed a number of buildings and uprooted more than 400 trees, which contributed to the closing of the camp grounds.

It was operated by the Sterling Camp Meeting Association, also known as the Worcester District Methodist Episcopal Church Camp-Meeting Association, which was incorporated on April 15, 1856. Records for the Sterling Camp Meeting from 1850 to 1952 are held at the Theology Library Archives at Boston University. The former Camp Meeting Grounds site, located at the Gates Road trail head, is no longer a religious center.

== Neighboring picnic grounds ==
At the turn of the 19th century, Washucam Pond was also the site of a picnic grounds built by the Fitchburg and Worcester Rail Line in 1879. Amenities included a baseball diamond, merry-go-round, rental boats, bowling alley, and a dance hall. There were cabins and a hotel for lodging. Each year more than 1,000 people came to the area for a boat parade. People traveled to the area on the railroad, with a stop at the entrance to the grounds. A steam boat, The Sterling transported people across West Waushacum Pond from the Sterling Camp Meeting Grounds to a wharf at the picnic grounds. Now called Waushacum Park, the former picnic grounds site is located just north of the Quag Bridge, with scenic views of the lakes and forests.
