= Redstone School =

Historic schoolhouse in Sudbury, Massachusetts, U.S.

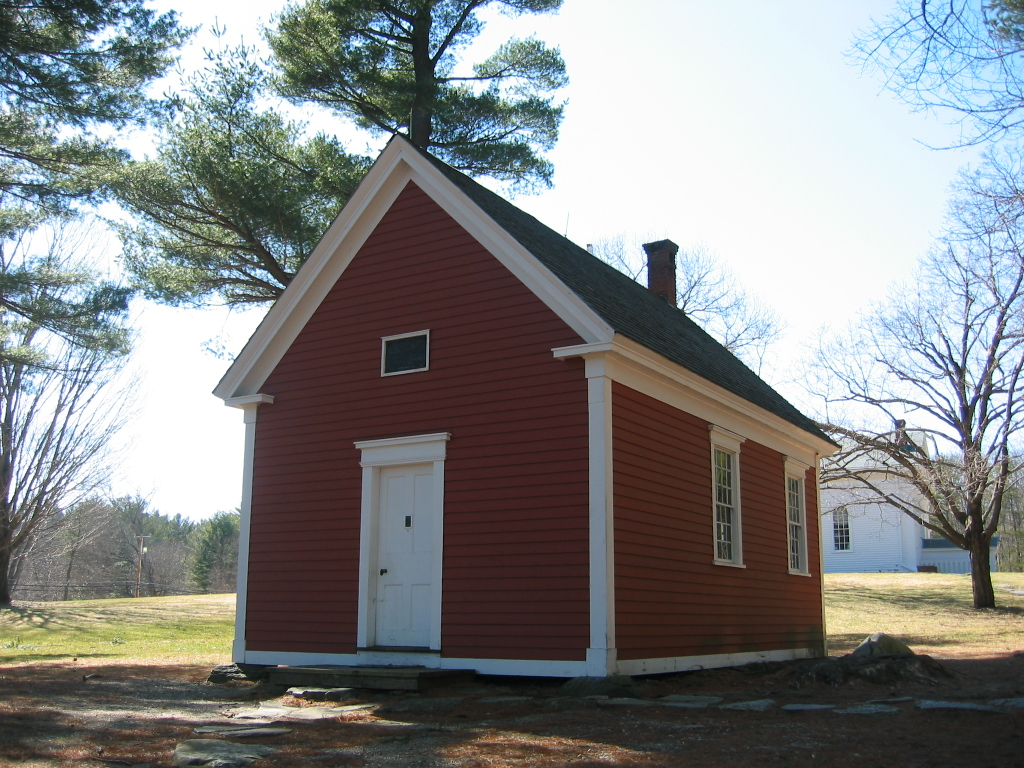
- Interactive map of the Redstone School area

General information
- Location: Sudbury, Massachusetts, U.S.
- Coordinates: 42.358650°N 71.471215°W
- Completed: 1798 (228 years ago)

Technical details
- Floor count: 1

The Redstone School is a one-room school located in the Wayside Inn Historic District of Sudbury, Massachusetts. Built in 1798, it is believed to be the school to which Mary Sawyer took her lamb in the nursery rhyme "Mary Had a Little Lamb".

At the time of Sawyer's attendance at the school, it was located in Sterling, Massachusetts. Since before the American Civil War, the building had served as a barn for a parsonage of a local Baptist church. In early 1926, the property was purchased by Henry Ford and relocated around 20 miles (32 km) to the east, to a churchyard, on the property of Longfellow's Wayside Inn, where it stands today. Ford operated the school for the benefit of children of his employees at the Wayside Inn.

On January 17, 1927, the building reopened as a school, operating for a further twenty-four years, with an average of around sixteen students of grades one through four. It closed permanently in 1951.

The school has windows on the right-hand side and at the rear; its blackboard occupies the interior of the left-hand wall.

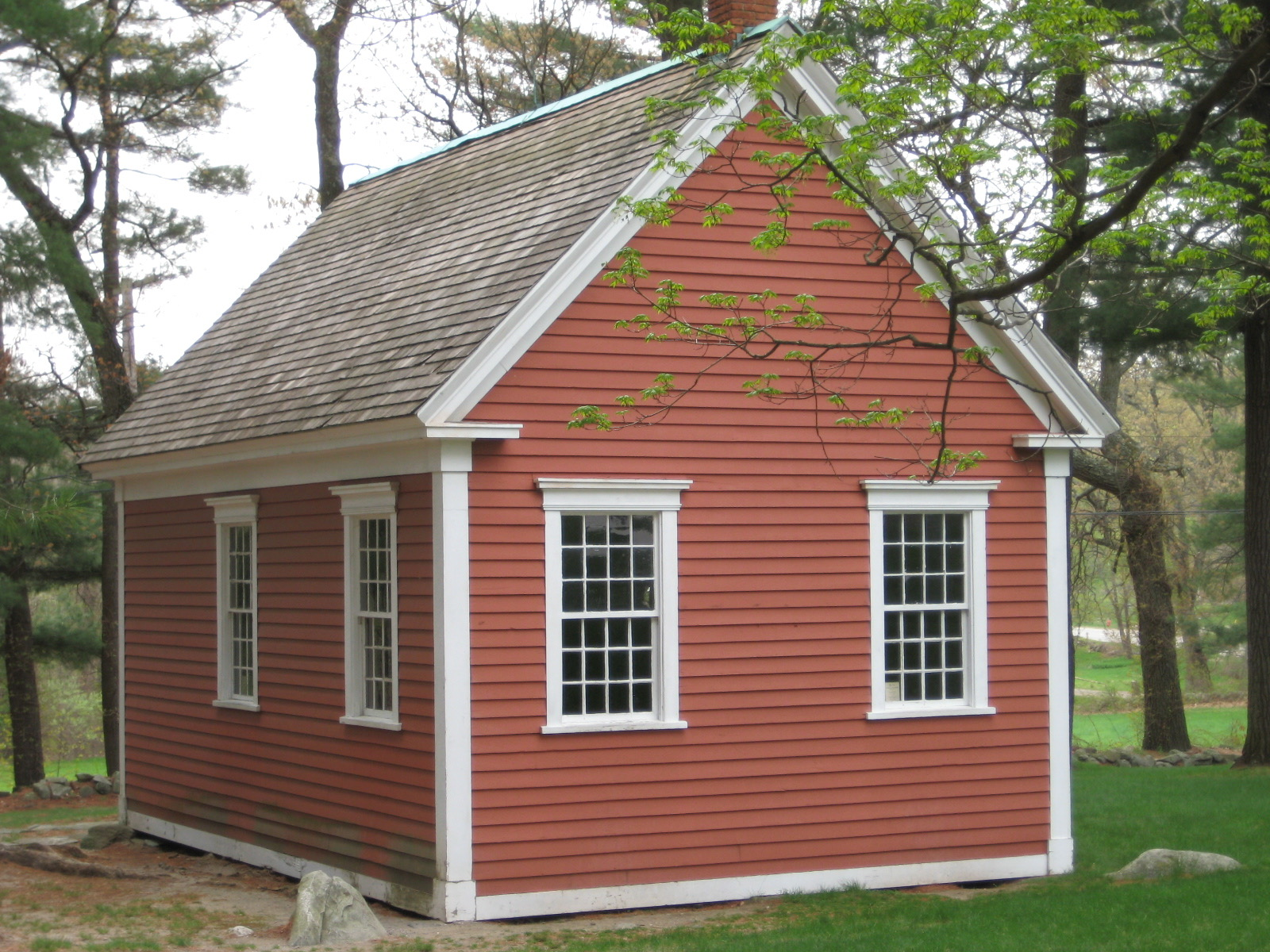
Rear

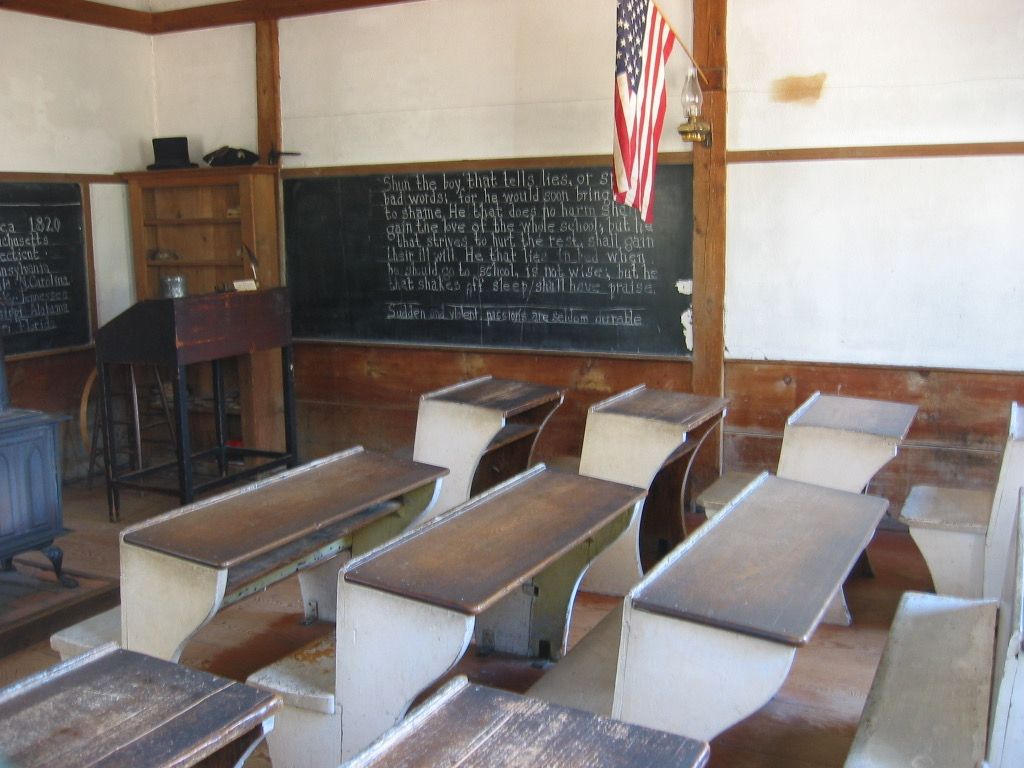
Interior
