= Coow Woow =

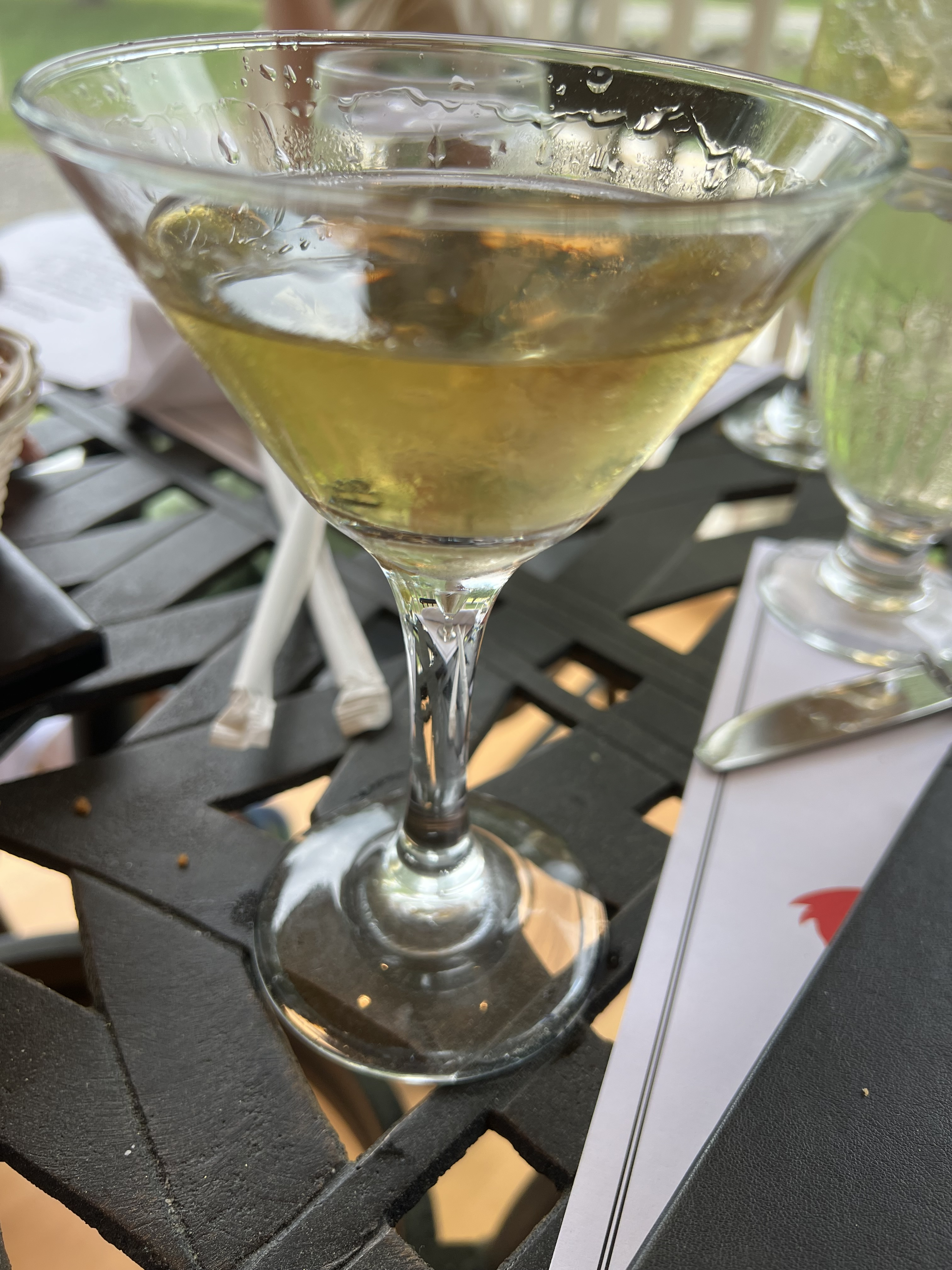
Coow Woow at the Wayside Inn in Sudbury, Massachusetts

A Coow Woow is a mixed alcoholic beverage made from ginger brandy and rum, purported but not proven to be the first of its kind in the United States, with earliest documentation to be from 1664. The Wayside Inn in Sudbury, Massachusetts serves Coow Woow drinks on its menu, and the history of the drink may be fictional.
