= Stony Man Mountain =

Mountain in Virginia, United States

Coordinates: 38°35′52″N 78°22′18″W

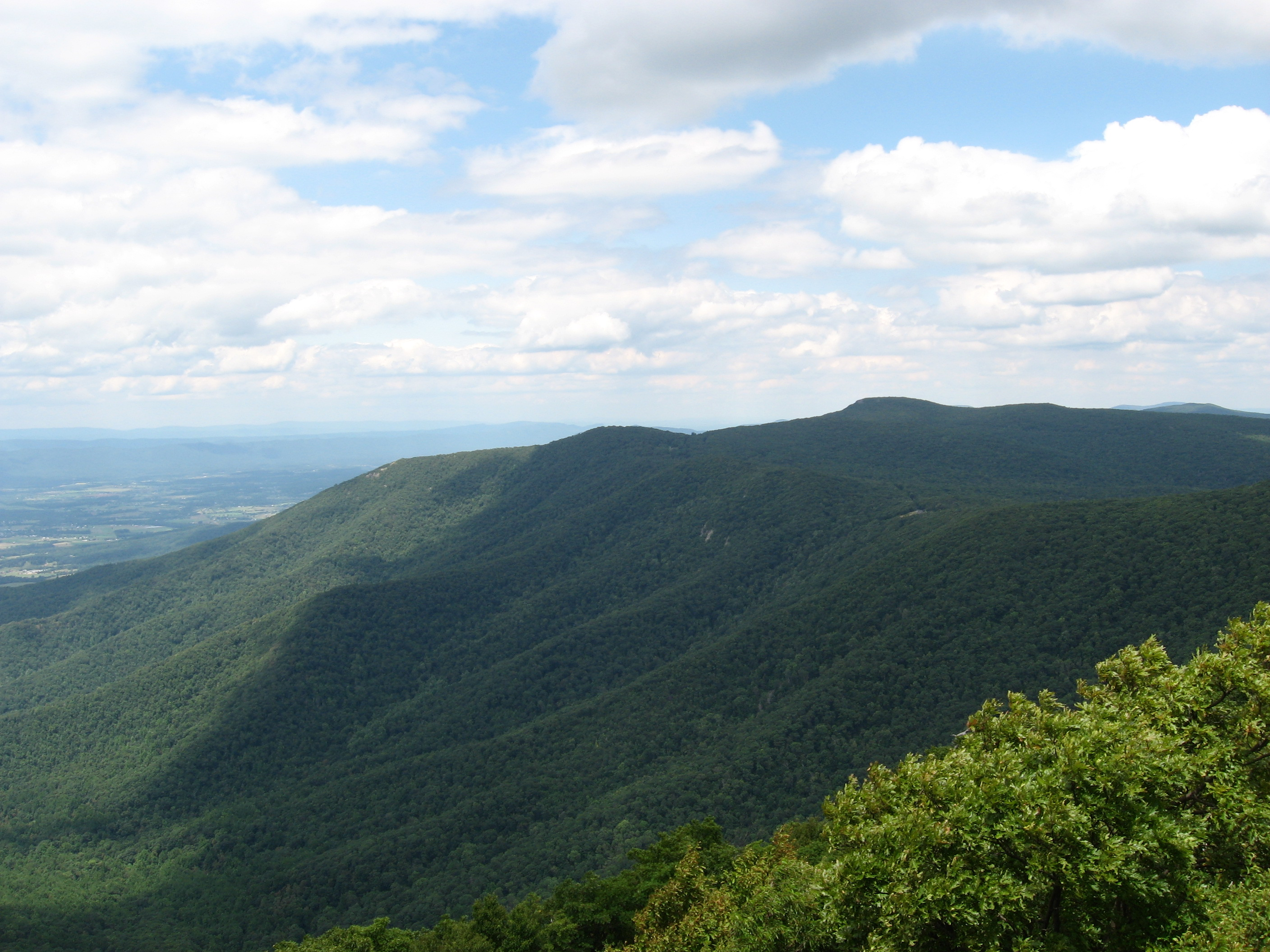
Stony Man Mountain viewed from Hawksbill in Shenandoah National Park, Virginia.

Stony Man Mountain, also known as Stony Man, is a mountain in Shenandoah National Park, Virginia and is the most northerly 4,000 foot peak in the Blue Ridge Mountains. Its maximum elevation is 4,011 feet or 1,223 meters above sea level with a clean prominence of 651 feet. The mountain is co-located in Madison and Page counties and is easily accessed from Skyline Drive by hiking trails. Along with Hawksbill Mountain (4,051 feet), it is one of only two peaks in the park higher than 4,000 feet. The shortest route to the summit is from the Skyland Resort and gains less than 400 vertical feet in about 1 kilometer. A longer, more challenging, route is from the Skyline Drive trail head at about milepost 39 of the Skyline Drive and gains almost 800 feet. The peak sits just southeast of the Appalachian Trail (AT) but the summit is accessible from the AT by previously mentioned spur trails. On the upper slopes of Stony Man one can see a few red spruce and balsam fir trees which typically grow in more northerly latitudes. The mountain is composed of ancient basalt which was metamorphosed into Greenstone through heat and pressure.

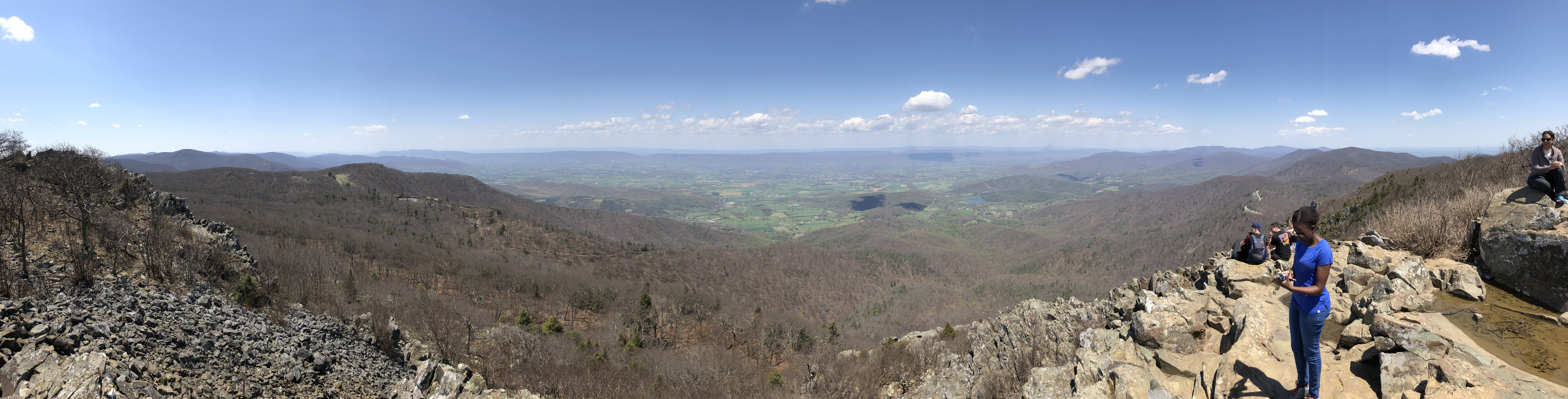
Partial panorama from the cliffs just northwest of the summit of Stony Man Mountain
