= Sterling, Massachusetts =

- Town
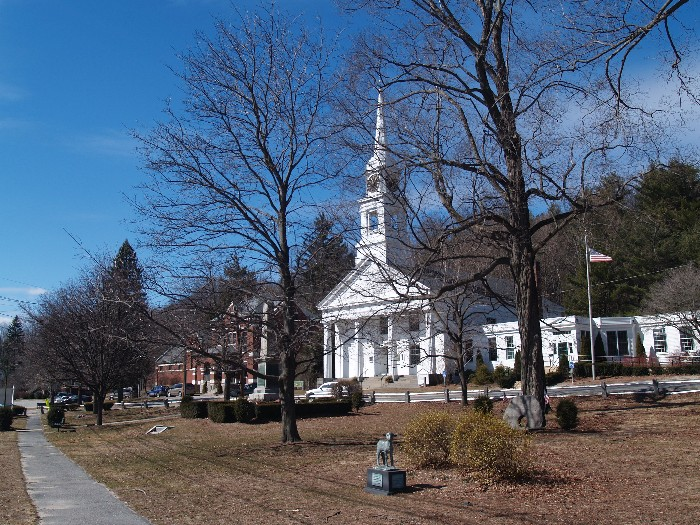
- Sterling Town Common

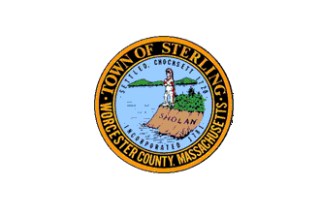
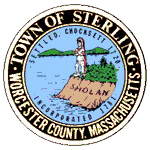
- Flag Seal

- Location in Worcester County and the state of Massachusetts
- Coordinates: 42°26′15″N 71°45′40″W
- Country: United States
- State: Massachusetts
- County: Worcester
- Settled: 1720
- Incorporated: 1781

Government
  - Type: Open town meeting
  - Town Administrator: Bill Caldwell
  - Select Board: Maureen Cranson; Ronald Furmaniuk; Patricia Ward; David A. Smith; Kirsten Newman

Area
  - Total: 31.6 sq mi (81.8 km^{2})
  - Land: 30.5 sq mi (79.0 km^{2})
  - Water: 1.1 sq mi (2.8 km^{2})
- Elevation: 502 ft (153 m)

Population (2020)
  - Total: 7,985
  - Density: 262/sq mi (101/km^{2})
- Time zone: UTC-5 (Eastern)
  - Summer (DST): UTC-4 (Eastern)
- ZIP code: 01564
- Area code: 351 / 978
- FIPS code: 25-67385
- GNIS feature ID: 0619490
- Website: www.sterling-ma.gov

Sterling is a town in Worcester County, Massachusetts, United States. The population was 7,985 at the 2020 census.

== History ==
Previous to its incorporation, it was "the Second Parish of Lancaster." It was commonly called by a portion of its Indian name, Chocksett. There was an Indian fort and graveyard located between East Waushacum Pond and West Waushacum Pond. Sagamore Sam, a Nashaway sachem and insurgent during King Philip's War, was from Waushacum.

The Nipmuc minister, Peter Jethro, worked in the area in the 1670s. The original Indian name of the area was Woonsechocksett. The land encompassing the Chocksett region was not originally included in the first land sold by the great Indian Chief Sholan to the settlers of the Lancaster grant. However, Sholan's nephew Tahanto would eventually sell the Chocksett land to the inhabitants of Lancaster in 1713.

The first white settlers arrived in Chocksett seven years later, in 1720, formerly inhabitants of Lancaster proper. Among these first settlers were families such as Beman, Sawyer, Houghton, and Osgood – names reflected to this day in the names of Sterling's oldest roads.

A short time after settlement, in 1733, the residents of the Chocksett area requested its own incorporation, separate from Lancaster, due to the "great inconvenience" of a long distance to the church in Lancaster's center. This request was denied. However, by 1780 the population of Chocksett was so numerous as to constitute a majority. So the voters of the area voted out the existing Lancaster town officers and began to conduct town business and meetings in Chocksett. This was enough to convince the rest of Lancaster that it was now time for Chocksett, the Second Parish of Lancaster, to go its own way.

In 1781, Chocksett was incorporated as its own town: Sterling. The town derives its name from General William "Lord Stirling" Alexander, who served under Gen. George Washington in the New York and other campaigns. His portrait hangs in the town hall, and the town commemorated Alexander with a medallion during its bicentennial celebration in 1981. A duplicate portrait resides in the town hall of New Windsor, NY.

== Geography ==
According to the United States Census Bureau, the town has a total area of 31.7 square miles (82 km^{2}), of which 30.6 square miles (79 km^{2}) is land and 1.1 square miles (2.8 km^{2}), or 3.42%, is water.

Interstate 190 cuts Sterling in half. Sterling is also crossed by Massachusetts Route 12, Massachusetts Route 62, Massachusetts Route 140, and Massachusetts Route 110.

Sterling is bordered by Leominster to the north, West Boylston to the south, Princeton and Holden to the west, Lancaster to the northeast, and Clinton and Boylston to the southeast. Sterling borders Boylston on the Wachusett Reservoir.

== Demographics ==
Historical population
Year	Pop.	±%
1790	1,428	—
1850	1,805	+26.4%
1860	1,881	+4.2%
1870	1,670	−11.2%
1880	1,414	−15.3%
1890	1,244	−12.0%
1900	1,420	+14.1%
1910	1,359	−4.3%
1920	1,305	−4.0%
1930	1,502	+15.1%
1940	1,713	+14.0%
1950	2,166	+26.4%
1960	3,193	+47.4%
1970	4,247	+33.0%
1980	5,440	+28.1%
1990	6,481	+19.1%
2000	7,257	+12.0%
2010	7,808	+7.6%
2020	7,985	+2.3%
2023*	8,204	+2.7%
* = population estimate. Source: United States census records and Population Estimates Program data.

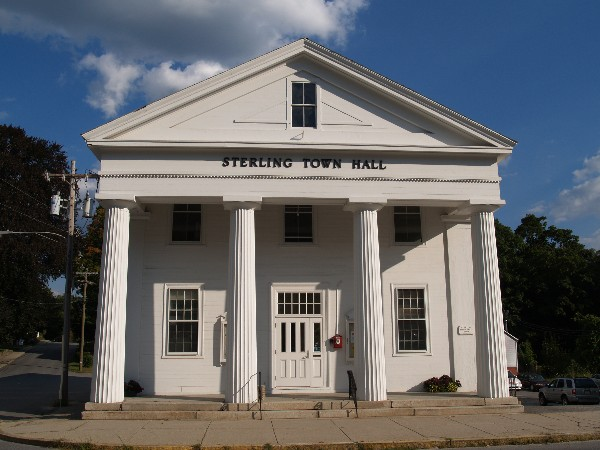
Old Town Hall

As of the 2020 United States census, there were 7.985 people and 3,248 households in the town. The population density was 260.8 inhabitants per square mile (100.7/km^{2}). The median value of owner-occupied housing units was $372,400. The racial makeup of the town was 95.7% White, 1.2% African American, 0.2% Native American, 0.4% Asian, and 1.9% from two or more races. Hispanic or Latino of any race were 3.3% of the population.

21.7% were under the age of 18, and 20.2% were 65 years of age or older. The population was 52.4% female.

The median income for a household in the town was $119,000. The per capita income for the town was $59,851. About 1.8% of the population was below the poverty line.

== Government ==
State government
State Representative(s):	Meghan Kilcoyne (D)
State Senator(s):	John J. Cronin (D)
Governor's Councilor(s):	Paul M. DePalo (D)
Federal government
U.S. Representative(s):	James P. McGovern (D-2nd District),
U.S. Senators:	Elizabeth Warren (D), Ed Markey (D)

=== Taxes ===
Residents of Sterling pay property taxes on real estate and certain other personal items, such as unregistered vehicles. The value of taxable property is determined by the town Board of Assessors. In 2023, the tax rate was $14.30 for one thousand dollars of valuation. Although the tax rate consistently decreased from 2016 to 2023, average bills have increased due to changes in valuation.

== Library ==
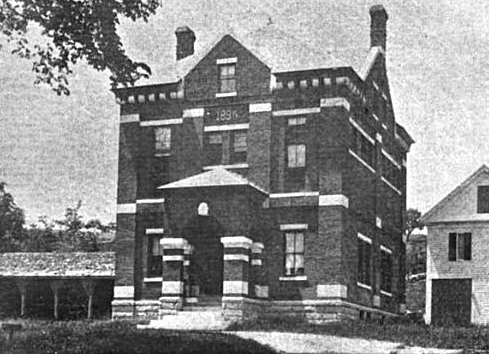
Conant Public Library, 1891

The Sterling public library began in 1871. The Conant Public Library building, financed by Edwin Conant in memory of his daughter Elizabeth Ann Conant, was dedicated in 1886. In fiscal year 2008, the town of Sterling spent 1.59% ($289,567) of its budget on its public library—approximately $36 per person, per year ($47.44 adjusted for inflation to 2022). The Conant Library building closed in 2002 so it could be renovated. During this time, the library was temporarily moved to the Old Town Hall. The renovation was finished in 2004, and the library returned to its original location.

== Education ==
Sterling is part of the Wachusett Regional School District. Students between Grades K–4 attend Houghton Elementary School, while students between Grades 5–8 attend Chocksett Middle School. Most Sterling residents attend Wachusett Regional High School in Holden for high school. Some Sterling residents, however, can attend Montachusett Regional Vocational Technical School in Fitchburg.

== Utilities ==
Sterling provides town water to many residents, although the more rural parts of town remain on private wells. The source of town water is six groundwater wells located on Redemption Rock Trail and Worcester Road. All public wells use an ultraviolet light purification system. In 2010, town water supply was affected by high bacteria levels, including detection of E. coli, and residents were advised to boil water until the situation was resolved.

There are no town sewer services, and all houses have private septic systems.

The town also offers curbside trash and recycling pickup for no additional fee. The town recycling center at the Sterling Department of Public Works closed permanently on July 1, 2015. Residents may use the Wachusett Watershed Regional Recycling Center in West Boylston, MA to drop off recycling and larger bulk items.

Sterling is one of 41 communities in the state that has its own municipal electric light company. The Light Department works under the direction and control of three elected Commissioners who serve rotating 3 year terms. The Light Board hires a Manager who runs day-to-day operations.

In fall of 2016, Sterling Municipal Light Department broke ground on the "first utility-scale energy storage facility in Massachusetts", which can, in the case of an electric outage, power the emergency dispatch center and police station for up to twelve days. The battery storage also helps the town save money on peak power charges from the grid operator. The award-winning project has generated considerable interest, attracting international visitors from Europe and Asia. In the aftermath of the devastating 2017 hurricanes Irma and Maria in the Caribbean, the microgrid project has been cited as a model of designing and building power infrastructure for resiliency in disaster situations.

In December 2019, an origin project that became the groundwork for a municipal broadband Wi-Fi service run by the Sterling Municipal Light Department commenced. It is called Sterling LAMB (Local Area Municipal Broadband). It is still expanding it's service availability.

Eversource provides natural gas service in Sterling.

== Points of interest ==
An annual event, the Sterling Fair, is typically held in early to mid-September. The Sterling Fair is one of the last remaining agricultural fairs with free admission. In addition to traditional livestock exhibits including goats, cows, rabbits and sheep, the fair has carnival games and rides, as well as patron-submitted exhibits and artwork, a petting zoo, contests, oxen pulls, a pancake breakfast held by the Sterling Chocksett Club, live music performances, food, and fireworks.

- Close proximity to Wachusett Mountain (state forest and ski area) and Leominster State Forest.
- Davis Farmland, a seasonal petting zoo for children and Davis Mega Maze, New England's only world-class adventure cornfield maze.
- Sholan Park located on Lake Waushacum has a beach area with a dock for swimming. It also has grills for cookouts, a sand volleyball court, and a boat ramp.
- The Sterling Spur of the Mass Central Rail Trail is named for the town, and future Mass Central Rail Trail segments are planned.
- The Sterling Auction is a weekly auction for antique goods held in the Sterling Community Theatre.

== Notable people ==
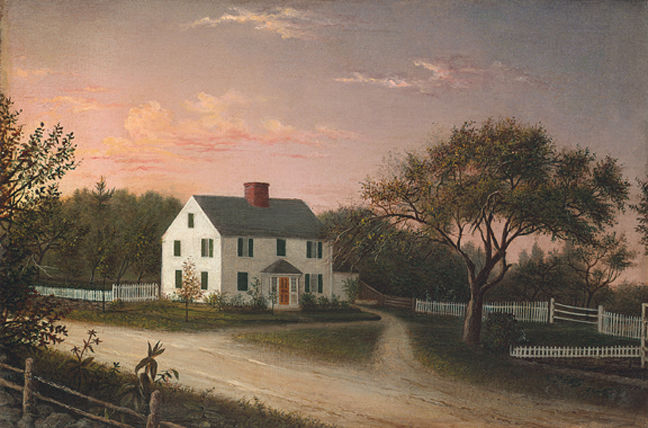
Blood Family Homestead (1859) in Sterling, by Mary Blood Mellen (1817–1882)

- Fred Borchelt (1954-), American Olympic athlete and physicist.
- Ebenezer Butterick (1826–1903), inventor of tissue paper dress patterns, which revolutionized home sewing. The town's municipal building is located in the old Butterick School, which was named after his daughter, Mary Ellen
- Edwin Conant, Businessman, Attorney, Philanthropist
- Charles Herbert Colvin, aeronautical engineer
- Jay Cutler, bodybuilder and four-time Mr. Olympia
- Meghan Kilcoyne, member of the Massachusetts House of Representatives for the 12th Worcester district, grew up in Sterling
- Prentiss Mellen, United States senator (1818–1820)
- William Francis Nichols, Arizona Territorial Secretary
- Le Gage Pratt, U.S. Representative from New Jersey
- George Putnam (1807–1878), Unitarian minister, politician, and Transcendentalist
- Arthur Prentice Rugg, Chief Justice, Massachusetts Supreme Court; born in Sterling
- Mary Sawyer Tyler, the alleged real-life "Mary" of the poem "Mary Had a Little Lamb"

== Film and literary references ==
- The 2001 film Shallow Hal had scenes shot in Sterling.
- Sterling is the setting of Sarah Josepha Hale's poem "Mary Had a Little Lamb". Mary Sawyer, the alleged real-life subject of the poem, lived in Sterling and attended the Redstone School. The Sawyers' house was a National Historic Place until it was destroyed by arson in August 2007. A new replica of the house has been created.

== See also ==
- Sterling Camp Meeting Grounds, a former Methodist Camp Meeting site
- National Register of Historic Places in Worcester County, Massachusetts. Sterling has several listed locations in the National Register of Historic Places.
