= Moses Gill =

Massachusetts state legislator (1733–1800)

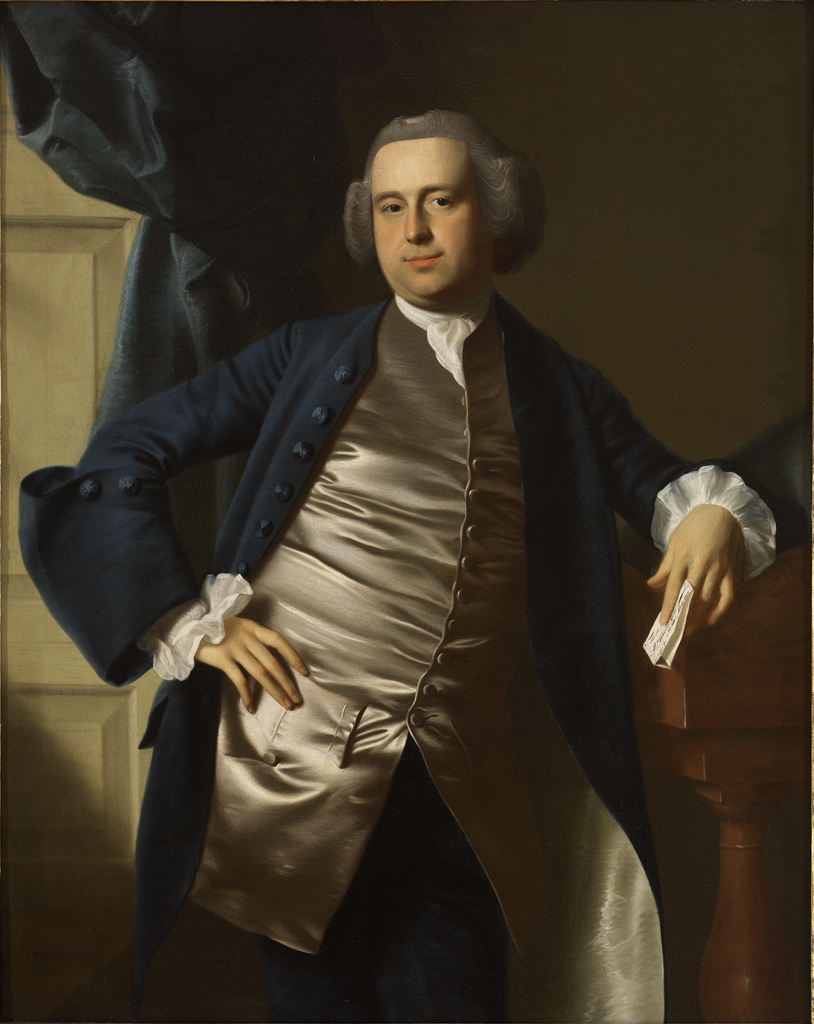
- Portrait by John Singleton Copley, 1764

Acting Governor of Massachusetts
- In office June 7, 1799 – May 20, 1800
- Lieutenant: Himself
- Preceded by: Increase Sumner
- Succeeded by: Governor's Council

4th Lieutenant Governor of Massachusetts
- In office May 29, 1794 – May 20, 1800
- Governor: Samuel Adams (1794–1797; Increase Sumner (1797–1799); Himself (1799–1800)
- Preceded by: Samuel Adams
- Succeeded by: Samuel Phillips Jr.

Committee of Safety
- In office October 7, 1774 – February 1, 1775
- Constituency: At-large (Commissary Officer)

Personal details
- Born: January 18, 1733 Charlestown, Province of Massachusetts Bay
- Died: May 20, 1800 (aged 67) Boston, Massachusetts, U.S.
- Party: Independent
- Spouse(s): Sarah Prince (1759–71); Rebecca Boylston Gill (1773–89)

Moses Gill (January 18, 1733 – May 20, 1800) was an American merchant and politician who served as the acting governor of Massachusetts from 1799 to 1800, when he died in office, the only acting governor to do so. A successful businessman, he became one of the most prominent colonists in Princeton, Massachusetts, entering politics shortly before the American Revolutionary War. He served on the Massachusetts Provincial Congress's executive committee until the state adopted its constitution in 1780, after which he continued to serve on the state's Governor's Council.

Elected lieutenant governor in 1794, he served in that office under Governors Samuel Adams and Increase Sumner until the latter died shortly after winning reelection in 1799. Gill served an apparently undistinguished term as acting governor until his own death in 1800, ten days before his successor, Caleb Strong, assumed office. Gill was a significant benefactor and founder of Leicester Academy, and supported the congregational church in Princeton, where the family had a large estate.

== Early life and family ==
Moses Gill was born January 18, 1733, to John and Elizabeth (Abbot) Gill in Charlestown, Province of Massachusetts Bay. He was one of the younger sons in a long line of children which included John Gill, who would become well known in the colonies as printer of the Boston Gazette. Gill entered business as a local merchant in Boston. In 1759 he married Sarah Prince, daughter to pastor Thomas Prince of Boston's Old South Church. Upon her father's death the couple inherited Prince's lands in western Worcester County, one of the largest tracts in what became the town of Princeton. In 1767 he retired from his business activities, and the couple divided their time between Boston and Princeton. Sarah died childless in 1771. Gill remarried in 1772 to Rebecca Boylston, a scion of the influential Boylston family and sister of Harvard College benefactor Nicholas Boylston. They were also childless; when his brother John died, Gill adopted one of his sons. The Gills were known to own several slaves.

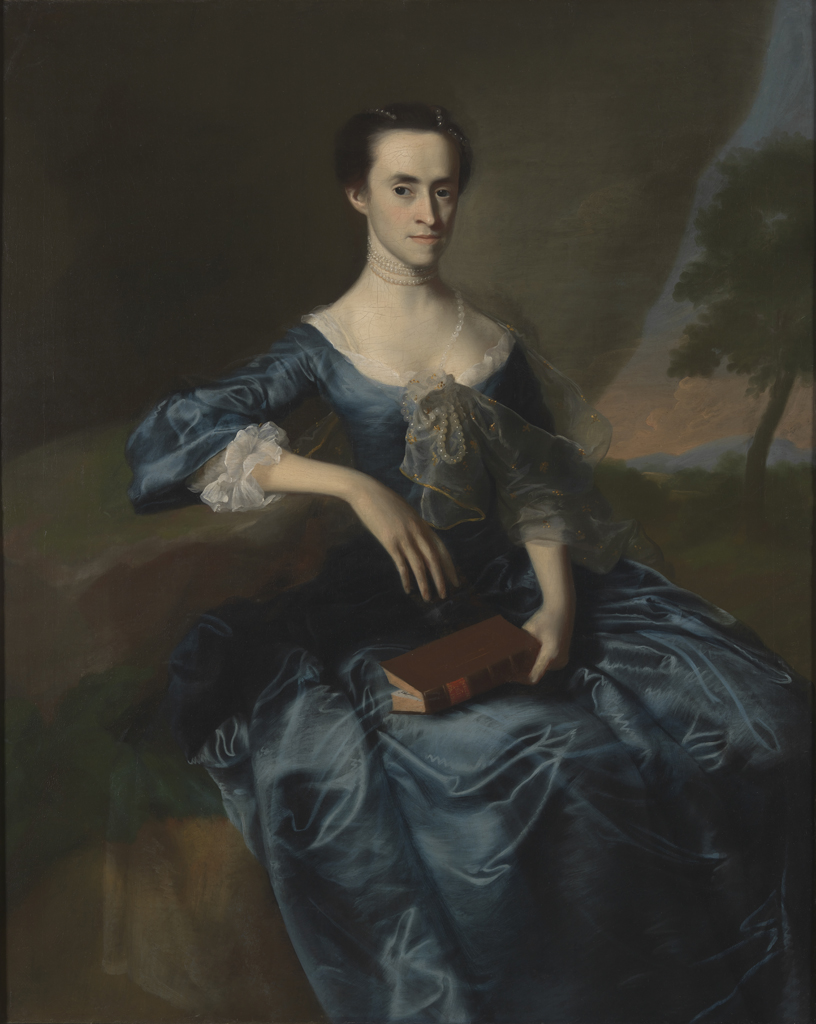
Portrait of Sarah Prince Gill by John Singleton Copley, 1764.

== Political career ==
In 1774, Gill entered politics, winning election to the provincial assembly. The assembly was dissolved by Governor Thomas Gage under the terms of the Massachusetts Government Act (a punishment of Massachusetts for the Boston Tea Party), but its members met shortly afterwards and reconstituted themselves as the Massachusetts Provincial Congress. Gill served on this body's executive council, which functioned as the de facto executive of the state until its constitution was adopted in 1780. When the American Revolutionary War broke in April 1775, Gill became involved in the early military organization of the Siege of Boston, heading the provincial congress' supply committee. He was also delegated, along with General Artemas Ward, to meet George Washington in Springfield and escort him to the army camps outside Boston.

Because of his prominence in Worcester County Gill was appointed to the county's district court when it was reorganized after the revolution began. In this role he sat on the panel that heard the preliminary cases in 1781 involving Quock Walker, an African American seeking a declaration of his freedom. Gill's panel decided in Walker's favor, and the Massachusetts Supreme Judicial Court eventually confirmed the judgments on appeal, declaring that slavery was incompatible with the state constitution.

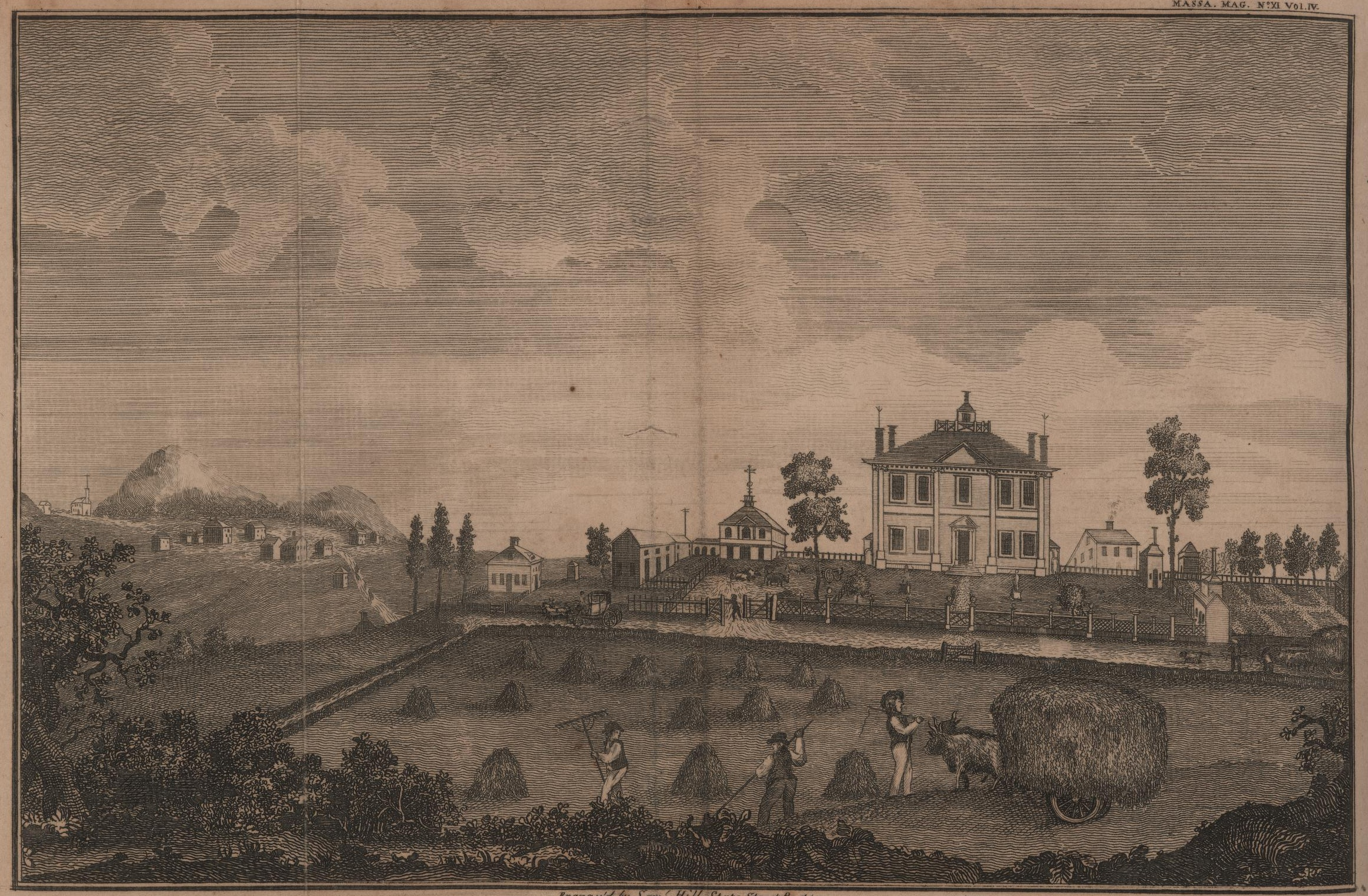
1792 engraving showing the Gill estate in Princeton

He continued to serve in the General Court (state legislature), winning election to the state senate annually from 1780, and being chosen by that body to serve on the Governor's Council. He stood for election to the United States House of Representatives in the 1789 election (the first after the adoption of the United States Constitution) but was defeated by Jonathan Grout. After the death of the immensely popular Governor John Hancock in 1793, the state's gubernatorial election of 1794 was a wide open race. Gill was one of several nominees for lieutenant governor, and received more votes than all nominees except the winning gubernatorial candidate, Samuel Adams. With no candidates for lieutenant governor receiving a majority, the General Court decided the election, choosing Gill. He thereafter won annual reelection to that post. In 1796 the aging Adams announced he would not run for reelection the following spring, and again the election was a wide open affair. The party system was still taking shape in the state, and the Federalists nominated Increase Sumner, while more populist factions that had previously supported Hancock and Adams nominated Gill and James Sullivan. Although Gill polled well in Boston and the eastern counties (present-day Maine), the Federalists won a decisive victory over the divided opposition. Since he was also nominated by one faction as lieutenant governor, Gill was again returned to that post. The principal issues in this and subsequent elections were over federal policy: specifically the national response to threats of war with Revolutionary France, and the consequent need for increased taxes to arm the nation. Gill's politics are unclear: historian Anson Morse is of the opinion that his popularity was not sufficient to head the ticket of either the Federalists or the Democratic-Republicans. Historian John Barry observes that Gill's term as acting governor, even though it was for essentially a full year, was "too short to be particularly distinguished".

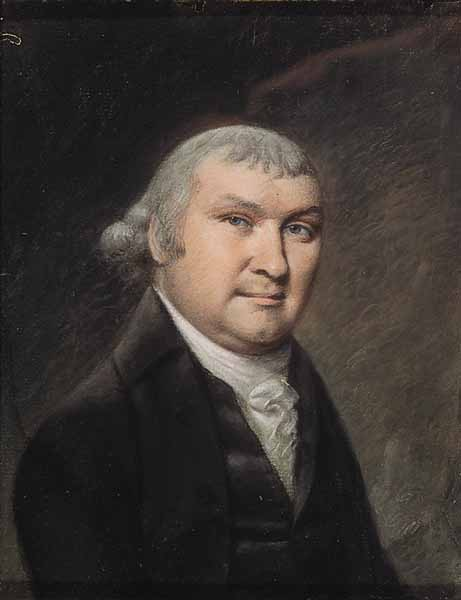
Gill was lieutenant governor under Increase Sumner.

Sumner easily won reelection in 1798 and 1799, but was ill during the 1799 race, which he won by a landslide. Constitutional issues were raised because he was on his deathbed and it was uncertain that he could even take the oath of office. Sumner finally took the oath of office in early June, but died a few days later, at which point Gill became acting governor. Gill served out Sumner's term, and was considered a candidate for the governorship as the 1800 election approached. The election primarily pitted Federalist Caleb Strong against Democratic-Republican Elbridge Gerry, and was won by Strong. Gill was derided by his opponents as the preferred candidate of the wealthy, and Federalists were accused of promoting him as a candidate in order to divide the opposition. Gill died on May 20, before Strong was informed of the victory, resulting in the only time in the state's history when the offices of governor and lieutenant governor were both formally vacant. As a result, the Governor's Council ruled the state for ten days. (The council had governed several times during the colonial period under similar circumstances; the state constitution was amended in 1918 to remove the council from the gubernatorial succession.)

== Philanthropy and legacy ==
Gill was a member and major supporter of the Congregational Church in Princeton, and a founding trustee and benefactor of Leicester Academy. He was also for many years president of the Society for Propagating the Gospel among the Indians. Gill, Massachusetts is named in his honor.

Gill also made civic contributions to the town of Princeton. Land he donated became the town's original center (located about one-half mile from the current town center). This land includes one the town's earliest cemeteries, which is where Gill and other members of his family are interred. His estate, located near the town center, was reputed to be one of the largest and most magnificent of its time in Worcester County. His second wife's nephew, Ward Nicholas Boylston, inherited the estate; in addition to many other charitable works, Boylston was a major contributor to the establishment of Princeton's present town center.
