= Lewis Evangelidis =

American politician (born 1961)

Lew Evangelidis
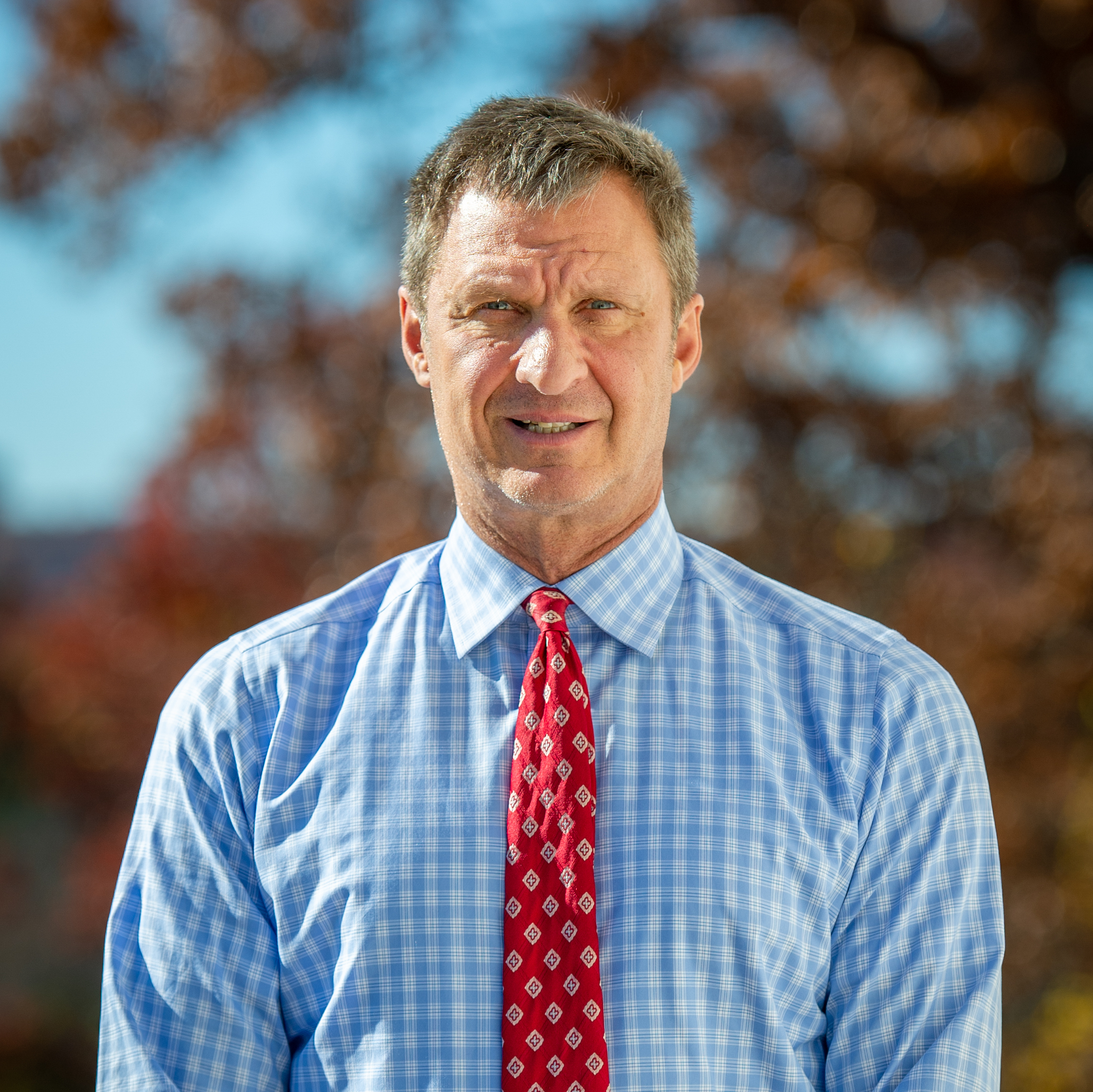

Sheriff of Worcester County
- Incumbent
- Assumed office January 5, 2011
- Preceded by: Guy Glodis

Member of the Massachusetts House of Representatives from the 1st Worcester district
- In office January 1, 2003 – January 5, 2011
- Preceded by: David Bunker
- Succeeded by: Kimberly Ferguson

Personal details
- Born: Lewis George Evangelidis; July 11, 1961 (age 65) Worcester, Massachusetts, U.S.
- Party: Republican
- Spouse: Mary Jude Pigsley
- Education: University of Massachusetts, Amherst (BS); Temple University (JD)
- Website: Campaign website

Lewis George Evangelidis (born 1961) is the sheriff of Worcester County, Massachusetts and a former member of the Massachusetts House of Representatives.

== Early life and education ==
Evangelidis was born in Worcester, Massachusetts to Judith C., and her husband George L. an attorney. Evangelidis is the first of three children including two sisters, Donna and Kim. He was raised in Holden, Massachusetts and graduated from Wachusett Regional High School.

Evangelidis attended the University of Massachusetts Amherst where he received a BS in Economics in 1983. He received a Juris Doctor degree from Temple University School of Law in 1987.

== Career before politics ==
Evangelidis worked in the legal departments of insurance companies. He worked an Assistant State Attorney in Dade County, Florida and as an Assistant District Attorney in Suffolk County, Massachusetts. After leaving the Suffolk County's District Attorney's office, Evangelidis went on to work for the Worcester, Massachusetts law firm of Pellegrini and Seeley.

== Political career ==
Before his election to the House of Representatives Evangelidis was a member of the Holden Finance Committee.

=== Massachusetts House of Representatives ===
In April 2002 Evangelidis announced that he was going to be a candidate for election to the first Worcester District of the Massachusetts House of Representatives. On September 17, 2002, in his first bid for elective office, Evangelidis won the Republican nomination for the Massachusetts House of Representatives. Evangelidis won the nomination over former Holden, Massachusetts Selectman Mark S. Ferguson by 53 votes. In that primary 2,568 votes were cast for Mr. Evangelidis vs. 2,515 for Mr. Ferguson.

On November 5, 2002, Evangelidis was elected to the Massachusetts House of Representatives defeating incumbent Democratic Representative David C. Bunker Jr. Evangelidis garnered 10,646 votes to 7,854 for Bunker. From January 2003 to January 2011. Evangelidis represented the 1st Worcester district made up out of the central Worcester County, Massachusetts communities of Holden, Westminster, Hubbardston, Oakham, Princeton, Rutland, and parts of Sterling.

==== 2009 Massachusetts House Republican Party Leadership contest ====
In November 2008, Evangelidis announced that he was going to run for House Minority Leader, the top Republican post in the Massachusetts House of Representatives. In the January 2009, leadership vote, Evangelidis lost the contest to incumbent House Minority Leader, Bradley Jones, Jr., by two votes, 9-7.

=== Worcester County Sheriff ===
On January 25, 2010 Evangelidis announced that he was going to run for Worcester County Sheriff. He was elected Sheriff in the Massachusetts state election held November 2, 2010.

Evangelidis was re-elected in November, 2022.

=== Massachusetts Port Authority ===
In April 2015, Massachusetts Governor Charlie Baker appointed Evangelidis to the Massachusetts Port Authority (Massport) Board of Directors, Baker swore Evangelidis onto the board on April 15, 2015. During his first term he was elected by his fellow Board members to serve a three year as Chair of the Massachusetts Port Authority Board of Directors. On July 14, 2020, Gov. Baker reappointed Evangelidis to another seven year term as a member of the Board of Directors.

=== Potential gubernatorial campaign ===
Evangelidis has expressed interest in running for the Republican nomination in the 2026 Massachusetts gubernatorial election.
