= Louise H. Gregory =

American zoologist (1880–1954)

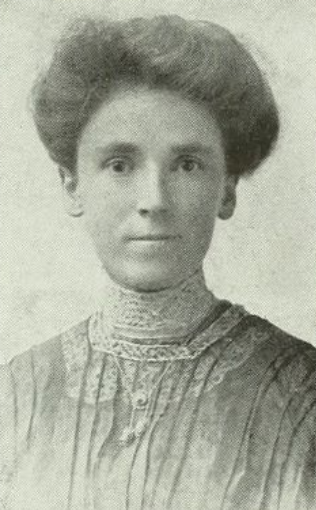
- Louise H. Gregory, from the 1914 yearbook of Barnard College
- Born: July 21, 1880; Princeton, Massachusetts
- Died: November 1, 1954 (aged 74); Holden, Massachusetts
- Occupations: Zoologist, college professor

Louise Hoyt Gregory (July 21, 1880 – November 1, 1954) was an American zoologist and college professor. She was acting dean of Barnard College in 1945 and 1946, and associate dean from 1934 to her retirement in 1949.

== Early life ==
Gregory, born in Princeton, Massachusetts, was the daughter of David Josiah Gregory and Emily Dupuy Skinner Gregory. She graduated from Vassar College in 1903 and obtained a master's degree from Columbia University in 1907. In 1909, she made history as the first woman to complete doctoral studies in zoology at Columbia. Her dissertation was a study of beetles titled "Observations on the life history of tillina magna" (1909).

== Career ==
Gregory taught zoology at Barnard College from 1908 to 1949. She became assistant professor of zoology in 1917, and associate professor in 1923, and full professor in 1936. She was associate dean of Barnard College in 1934, and acting dean when Virginia Gildersleeve was called away on other work in 1945 and 1946. In 1947 she became Barnard's first associate dean of student administration. She retired in 1949 as professor emerita.

== Selected publications ==
Gregory's biological research involved experimental and observational studies of worms, beetles, aphids, and one-celled organisms:

- "The Effects of Changes in Medium during Different Periods in the Life History of Uroleptus mobilis and Other Protozoa" (1928)
- "Effects of Changes in Medium during Different Periods in the Life History of Uroleptus mobilis. 2. The Effects of Di-Sodium and Di-Potassium Phosphate" (1926)
- "Direct and after Effects of Changes in Medium during Different Periods in the Life History of Uroleptus mobilis. I. Effects of Beef Extract" (1925)
- "The Conjugation of Oxytricha Fallax" (1923)
- "The Effect of Starvation on the Wing Development of Microsiphum destructor" (1917)
- "Notes on the Effect of Mechanical Pressure on the Roots of Vicia Faba" (1909)
- "The Segmental Organ of Podarke Obscura" (1907)
- "Hermaphroditism in Sabella microphthalama Verrill" (1905)

== Personal life ==
Gregory died at a hospital in Holden, Massachusetts in 1954, aged 74 years. The Louise H. Gregory Scholarship Fund was established at Barnard College in 1955.
