= Princeton Center Historic District =

Historic district in Massachusetts, United States

- U.S. National Register of Historic Places
- U.S. Historic district
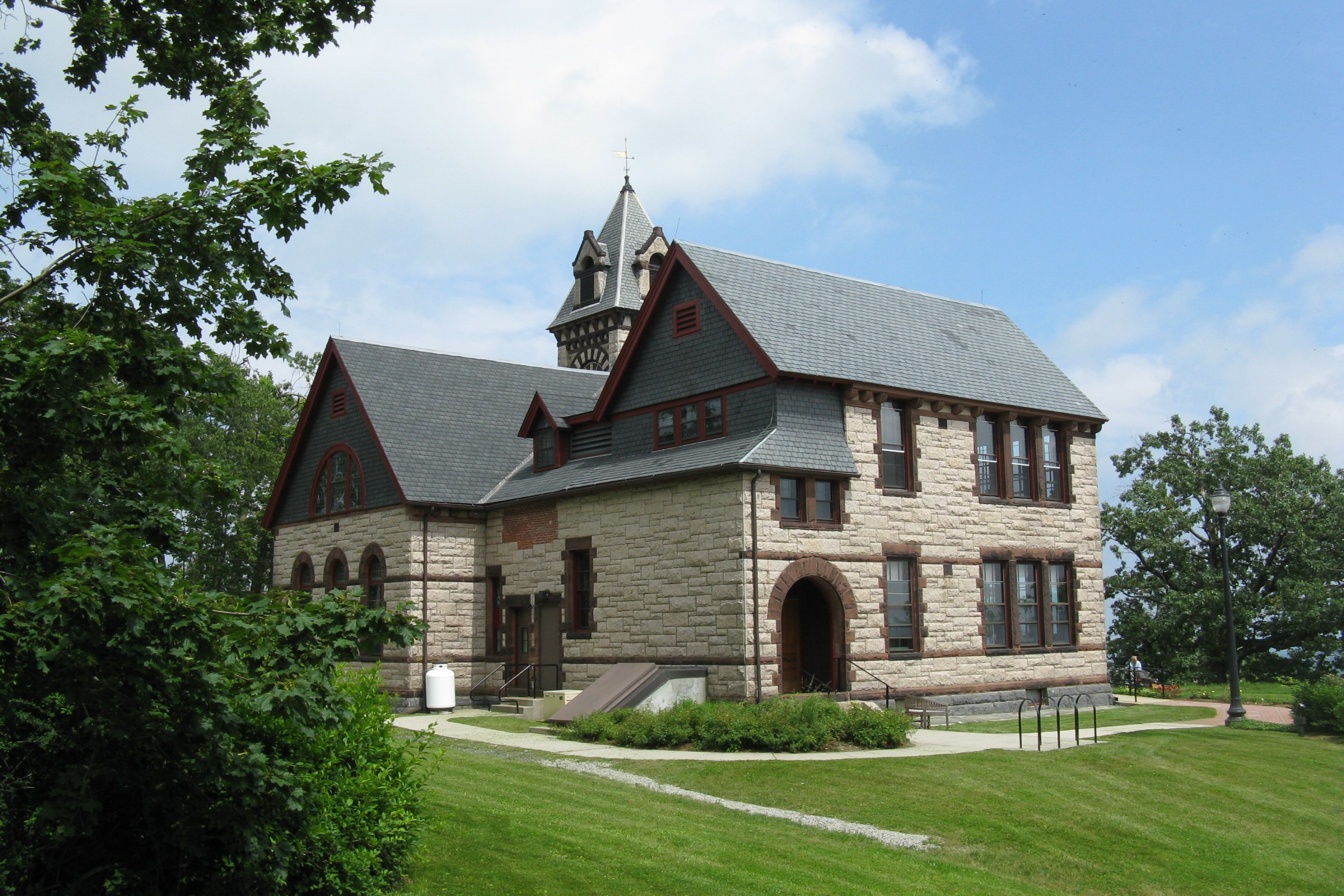
- Princeton Public Library

- Location within Massachusetts Location within the United States
- Location: Princeton, Massachusetts
- Coordinates: 42°26′57″N 71°52′43″W
- Area: 165 acres (67 ha)
- Built: 1885
- Architect: Earle, Stephen C.; Norcross Bros.
- Architectural style: Romanesque Revival
- NRHP reference No.: 99000259 (original); 06000130 (increase)

Significant dates
- Added to NRHP: February 26, 1999
- Boundary increase: March 10, 2006

The Princeton Center Historic District is a historic district encompassing the 19th century center of Princeton, Massachusetts. The district is centered at the junction of Hubbardston and Mountain Roads, and includes the town common, town hall, public library, and First Congregational Church. When first listed on the National Register of Historic Places in 1999, the district encompassed 11 acres (4.5 ha), and included only the common, town hall, and library; it was expanded in 2006 to 165 acres (67 ha), and included much of the village of Princeton Center.

== See also ==
- Russell Corner Historic District
- West Village Historic District (Princeton, Massachusetts)
- East Princeton Village Historic District
- National Register of Historic Places listings in Worcester County, Massachusetts
