= West Village Historic District =

West Village Historic District may refer to:

- West Village Historic District (Princeton, Massachusetts), listed on the NRHP in Worcester County, Massachusetts
- West Village Historic District (Detroit, Michigan), listed on the NRHP as West Village District
- West Village Historic District (Buffalo, New York), listed on the NRHP in Erie County, New York
