= Burt Grinstead =

American actor (born 1988)

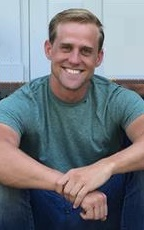
- Burt Grinstead in 2015
- Born: 22 August 1988 (age 38)
- Occupations: Actor, writer, film producer
- Website: www.blanketfortentertainment.com

Burt Grinstead (born 1988) is an American actor, producer, and writer. He is best known for Sebastian (2016), Eat with Me (2014), and The Lost Footage of Leah Sullivan (2016).

== Early life ==
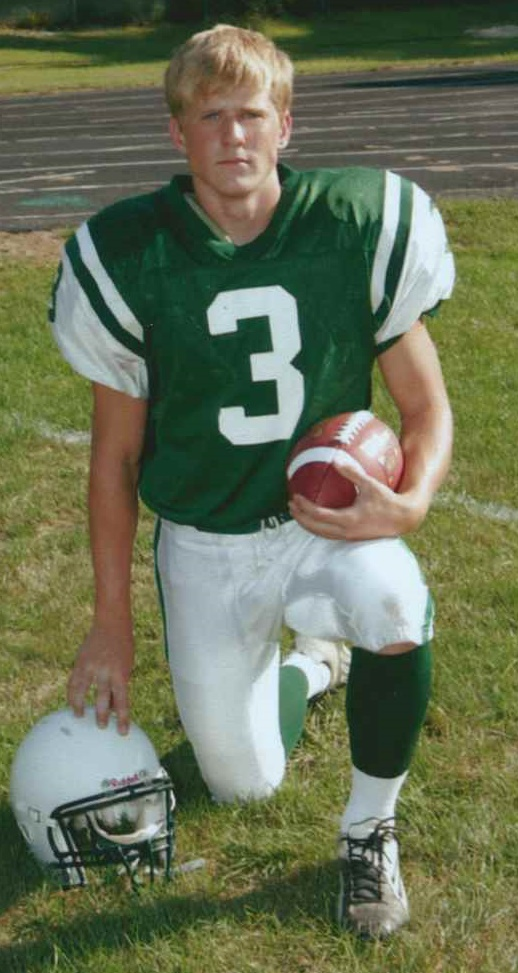
Burt Grinstead in High School Football Uniform

Grinstead was born in 1988, in Boca Raton, Florida. He moved with his family to Bel Air, Maryland. He spent most of his childhood in the small town of Paxton, Massachusetts, where he attended Wachusett Regional High School and played football and lacrosse. As a child, his family spent some time living in Southern California. It was during that time that Grinstead began acting in commercials. He later trained as an actor at The American Academy of Dramatic Arts in New York City.

== Career ==
Grinstead with his wife Anna Stromberg started a production company, Blanket Fort Entertainment. Together they have written, produced and starred in a feature film, The Lost Footage of Leah Sullivan and a theatrical adaptation of Robert Louis Stevenson's classic The Strange Case of Dr. Jekyll and Mr. Hyde, aptly named Dr. Jekyll & Mr. Hyde.

Grinstead has guest starred and co-starred in television shows like Malibu Country, Criminal Minds, NCIS, The Mentalist, NCIS: Los Angeles, and 911. He has appeared in many movies and theatrical productions as well.

== Filmography ==
=== Film ===
| Year | Title | Role | Notes |
|---|---|---|---|
| 2011 | The Fence | Jacob Cooper | Short film |
| 2012 | Abigail | Brandon Wescot | Short film |
| 2014 | Eat With Me | Austin | |
| 2014 | Sebastian | Josh Cooper | |
| 2015 | Better Half | Paul | |
| 2015 | Brother of Abraham | Mark | Short Film - In post-production |
| 2016 | Speak | Patrick | Short Film |
| 2017 | Death Race 2050 | Jed Perfectus | |
| 2018 | The Lost Footage of Leah Sullivan | Patrick | |
| 2019 | Concession | Michael | Short film |

=== Television ===
| Year | Title | Role | Notes |
|---|---|---|---|
| 2012 | Malibu Country | Bodie | 1 episode |
| 2013 | Don't Trust the B— in Apartment 23 | Contestant | 1 episode |
| 2013 | Criminal Minds | Wade Burke | Episode: "Pay It Forward" |
| 2013 | The Middle (TV Series) | Player #2 | 1 episode |
| 2014 | NCIS | Navy Lieutenant Junior Grade William Greco | 1 episode |
| 2014 | Looking for Mr. Right | Matt | Television film |
| 2015 | NCIS: Los Angeles | Michael | 1 episode |
| 2015 | The Mentalist | Realtor | Episode: "The Whites of His Eyes" |
| 2015 | Quarter Life (Crisis) | Burt | 1 episode |
| 2015 | Dropping the Soap | Sean | 3 episodes |
| 2016 | Hometown Hero | Teddy | Television Film |
| 2016 | Dating Myself | Guy #1 | 1 episode |
| 2016 | Written By | JC | Television Film |
| 2018-2019 | 9-1-1 | Drew Hudson | 2 episodes |
| 2019 | The Neighborhood | Climber | Episode: "Welcome to the Climb" |

== Awards and nominations ==
| Year | Association | Category | Work | Result | Ref. |
|---|---|---|---|---|---|
| 2013 | Ovation Awards | Lead Actor in a Play | Dying City | Nominated | |
| 2014 | LA Weekly Theater Award | 2 Person Performance | Dying City | Nominated | |
| 2015 | Indie Series Awards | Best Lead Actor - Comedy | Burt Paxton: Private Detective | Nominated | |
| 2016 | Stage Raw Theater Awards | Supporting Male Performance | Hit the Wall | Nominated | |
