= Leicester Academy =

Coordinates: 42.2472°N 71.9044°W

Information
- Established: 1784
- Closed: 1921

Leicester Academy was a private, state chartered school in Leicester, Massachusetts.

== History ==
Leicester Academy was founded on March 23, 1784, when the Act of Incorporation for Leicester Academy was passed by the Massachusetts General Court as a private, state chartered institution. The charter issued to the Academy bears the bold signature of John Hancock, Governor of Massachusetts; and Samuel Adams, President of the Senate. The Academy opened on June 7, 1784 on land donated by Jewish merchant Aaron Lopez in Leicester, Massachusetts.

Early trustees of the academy included Rufus Putnam (who was also one of its principal benefactors), Moses Gill, Levi Lincoln Sr., Joseph Allen, Seth Washburn, Samuel Baker, and several clergymen of the area. The purpose of Leicester Academy was to promote piety and virtue; and for the education of youth in the English, Latin, Greek, and French languages, together with writing, arithmetic and the art of speaking.

The first faculty consisted of two teachers, a principal and an English preceptor. When the school opened, there were three students, two from Sturbridge and one from Leicester. By the end of the school year, the number increased to twenty, and within two years, there were seventy-five students. Shortly after it was founded, Leicester Academy became coeducational, a very unusual situation during those times.

Prior to his entering law school and election to Congress, William Whitney Rice served as an English preceptor at the Academy. Because of its excellent academics, Leicester Academy attracted students from all over Massachusetts and from several other states as well. Many of its early graduates became nationally known. Among them were Samuel Crafts, who was a Congressman and Governor of Vermont; Eli Whitney, the famous inventor; Navy Secretary David Henshaw, and others representing every walk of life.

In 1856, a compulsory education law was passed in Massachusetts, which caused Leicester and other surrounding towns to establish a public high school. This caused such a decrease in the academy's enrollment such that, in 1867, the town's high school was combined with Leicester Academy and town funds were used to support the institution.

At the fourth Constitutional Convention of the Commonwealth of Massachusetts in 1917, an anti-aid amendment prohibited public funding of any privately owned school or college. After this amendment was ratified by vote of the people, the trustees of Leicester Academy gave up the academy and leased a building to the Town of Leicester for the high school.

In 1921, the Leicester Academy became the Leicester High School because of increased costs requiring financial assistance from the town of Leicester, which made it a full public secondary school.

== Notable alumni ==
- Thomas Hill (1837), former president of Harvard University
- George Putnam, Unitarian minister and Transcendentalist
- Elliott P. Joslin (1886), pioneer in the clinical use of insulin
- Eli Whitney (1786), inventor
