= Sarah Prince Gill =

American Christian prayer group leader and writer

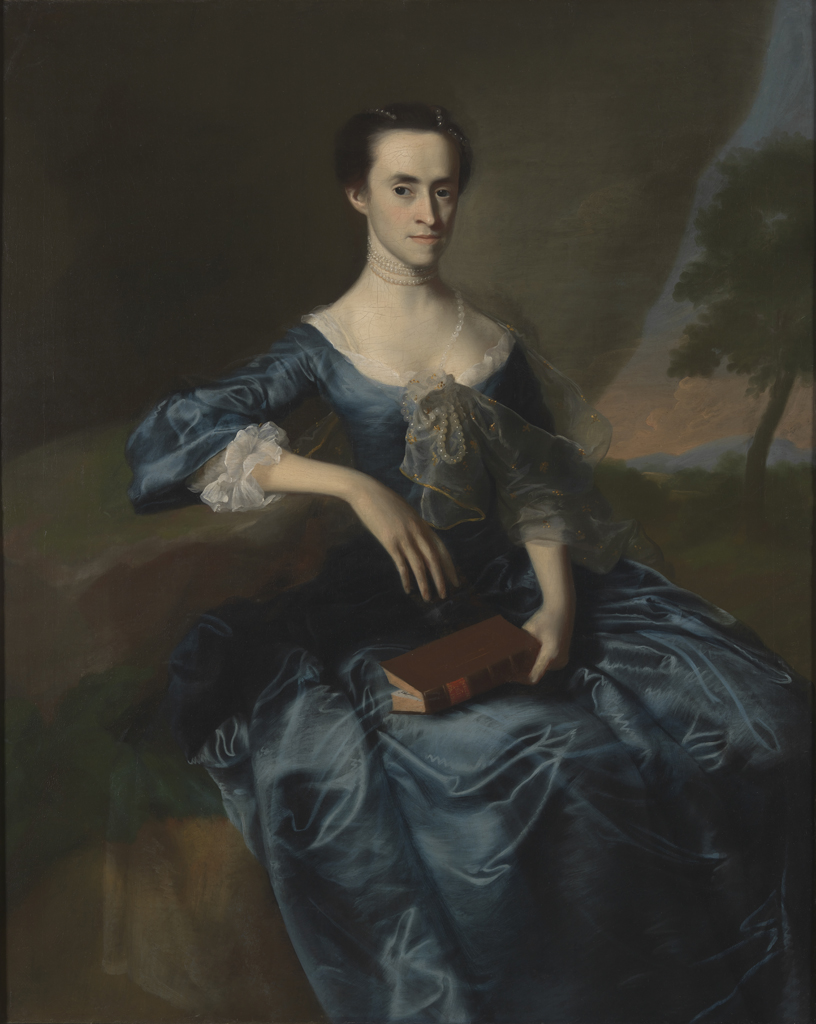
Portrait of Sarah Prince Gill by John Singleton Copley, 1764.

Sarah Prince Gill (July 16, 1728 – August 5, 1771) was an American Christian prayer group leader and writer.

== Life ==
Sarah Prince was the 4th of five children born to Deborah Denny and Thomas Prince. Thomas was the minister at Boston's Old South Church and a part of the Great Awakening.

Sarah Prince was educated at home. Thomas was particularly devoted to his children's education, "it was no small part of his labor and happiness to impress on his children a suitable sense of religion; and properly to form their sentiments, manners and taste." Sarah Prince was widely read and likely educated to read Latin.

Sarah Prince began journaling intermittently in 1734, but her most consistent period of writing lasted from the mid-1750s to 1764. It is believed that she partially revised her journals towards the end of her life in order to polish her writing.

Through her father, Sarah Prince was introduced to Esther Edwards Burr, daughter of Jonathan Edwards and future mother of Aaron Burr. Sarah and Esther corresponded throughout the 1750s. Perhaps inspired by Samuel Richardson's Clarissa, the two young women exchanged journals with the goal of helping their self-improvement. They hid their correspondence from many of their acquaintances. According to historian Philip J. Greven, the two women were "as close, if not closer than, sisters." As Esther wrote to Sarah in 1754, "I esteem you one of the best, and in some respects nearer than any Sister I have."

Esther Edwards Burr died on April 7, 1758. Sarah Prince was nearly inconsolable. “My whole dependance for Comfort in this World [is] gone,” Sarah wrote in her personal book of meditations. Esther “was dear to me as the Apple of my Eye- she knew and felt all my griefs..."

Sarah Prince also corresponded with Catharine Macaulay.

Although multiple men tried to court her, Sarah Prince remained singled and living with her parents throughout her twenties. By 1752, Sarah was the only surviving child in the family.

After the death of her father, 31 year old Sarah Prince married Moses Gill, a wealthy Boston merchant. She was six years his senior.

Sarah Prince Gill died at the age of 43 on August 5, 1771. She had no children.

== Legacy ==
Esther Edwards Burr's letters to Sarah Prince are the most extensive surviving literary criticism written by a colonial American woman. The Journal of Esther Edwards Burr, 1754-1757 were published in 1984 by Yale University Press.

In 2005, Prince's conversion narrative was published by the University of Tennessee Press as part of The Silent and Soft Communion: The Spiritual Narratives of Sarah Pierpont Edwards and Sarah Prince Gill, edited by Sue Lane McCulley and Dorothy Zayatz Baker.
