= Wachusett Regional High School =

Coordinates: 42°21′11.7″N 71°52′23.8″W

Location
- 1401 Main Street; Holden, MA 01520; United States

Information
- Type: Public comprehensive secondary
- Established: 1955
- School district: Wachusett Regional School District
- Superintendent: James Reilly
- CEEB code: 221010
- Principal: Michael Prat
- Teaching staff: 137.13 (FTE)
- Grades: 9-12
- Enrollment: 1,779 (2024-2025)
- Student to teacher ratio: 12.97
- Classes offered: 616
- Colors: Green & white
- Athletics conference: Midland Wachusett League
- Mascot: Mountaineer
- Rival: Leominster High School
- Newspaper: Wachusett Echo
- Communities served: Holden, Paxton, Princeton, Rutland, Sterling

Wachusett Regional High School (WRHS) is located in Holden, Massachusetts, United States and services the Wachusett Regional School District. Founded in 1955, the school educates students from Holden, Paxton, Princeton, Rutland, and Sterling. It is the first regional high school in Massachusetts.

== Academics ==
The school offers a wide range of courses in many subjects, chiefly of four difficulty levels. The CPA, College Prep - Accelerated, is the accelerated college preparatory level, and the majority of students take classes at this level. The Honors level is above CPA. CP, College Prep is the regular level for students and prepares them for studies after high school. Students at the CP level may need a little extra support with their studies to prepare them for post-high school studies. The fourth main class level is AP, or Advanced Placement, a College Board program through which college credit can be awarded for excellent performance on year-end standardized exams. There are also V or "0" level courses, which are usually mandatory or non-academic, such as physical education and special education courses.

The Advanced Placement program at the school has proven a great success. Since 2005, 88% of students taking the end-of-year examination have earned a score of "3" or better, qualifying many of the students for college credit. As of 2010, the high school offers nineteen Advanced Placement courses.

The high school also consistently exceeds state and national averages for the Scholastic Aptitude Test, or SAT.

== School activities ==
=== Music Department ===
WRHS has a large and well-regarded music department- which includes several choirs or varying sizes, orchestra and concert bands, string and wind ensembles, as well as jazz performance groups (both vocal and instrumental). WRHS's music department also has a special partnership with the Boston Symphony Orchestra which permits the students to sit in on rare closed rehearsals of the orchestra. In the spring of 2005, WRHS performed admirably at an international music competition in Toronto, Ontario. At the Festival of Music, Wachusett received first place in the Jazz Band competition, receiving recognition for having several excellent musicians, soloists, and sections. Jazz Choir and Orchestra also took first place in their respective categories. Singers and Chamber Choir took first place in the Mixed Men's and Women's Choir section. String Orchestra received a first place award as well. Wind Ensemble received second place overall. In April 2003 and 2007, the Honors Music Program performed in Florida and visited Walt Disney World, performing on various stages within the park and in Disney Springs. Also in 2007, the Honors Choirs performed at Foxwoods with Kenny Rogers. They performed in 2008 at Mohegan Sun. In the spring of 2009, WRHS competed in the North American Festival of Music in Toronto, Ontario, receiving several first and second place awards, under the direction of Thomas Nerbonne.

The Wachusett Madrigal Singers were first led to International Music Festival Gold in 1993 by beloved director, and recipient of the MMEA Lowell Mason Award, and the MMEA Distinguished Service Award, Grace V Reidy.

== Extracurricular activities ==
=== Wachusett Model United Nations and Civics Club ===
Wachusett's Model United Nations program was first established in the 1970s. Under the current guidance of a political science teacher, Wachusett frequents several model United Nations conferences in locations such as Northeastern University, Massachusetts Institute of Technology, Clark University, and Princeton University. The Wachusett Model United Nations organization has since been disbanded and replaced by the Wachusett Civics Club. This new club was founded in 2018 and continues to participate in model United Nations events along with Model Congress and moot court.

=== Massachusetts Club ===
Formed during the 2005–2006 school year, the Massachusetts Club takes group trips to historic places throughout the state, usually on weekends. Trips taken include a day spent in Rockport, several visits to Boston, and a trip to Salem.

=== Sports ===
Under the school colors of green and white, Wachusett fields many perennially competitive sports teams. The school has forty-six athletic programs, in which about 1,000 students participate. These include lacrosse, American football, basketball, baseball, soccer, tennis, ice hockey, track, cross country, lacrosse, alpine skiing, volleyball, gymnastics, field hockey, golf, and swimming.

The girls' soccer team won consecutive Division 1 state championships in 2017 and 2018. The girls' indoor track team won the Division 1 state championship in 2018. The boys' hockey team won the Division 3 state championship in 2019. The girls' cross-country team has won 13 consecutive league championships, and a number of consecutive district championships. Both girls' and boys' track teams are consistently among state's best. Wachusett's soccer teams have also won several championships, most recently the girls' team in 2017. In 2004, the boys' basketball team won the District Championship, supported by the enormous "Badlands" student rooting section, known as the loudest student section in Central Massachusetts. The school's football team went undefeated in the 2003 season, and has won back-to-back Super Bowl titles. The team went undefeated again in 2009, with a record of 13–0, beating 4th ranked Holy Name in the Super Bowl. In 2007, the girls' gymnastics team was crowned Mid-Wach league champions following an undefeated season, and went on to place 6th overall in the state. The baseball team won district championships in 2010 and 2017 and selected and won games in the Super Eight State Tournament in 2015 and 2018. The cheerleading team has won multiple national championships. The boys' varsity hockey team won the 2018-2019 state championship, playing their last game in TD Garden.

=== Science Seminar and Science Fair ===
Every year, Wachusett conducts a school science fair. Winners of the school competition advance to the Regional Science Fair. To help students develop high quality projects and to stimulate their interest in science, Wachusett holds Science Seminar meetings every Tuesday night. Interested students take an entrance examination in order to be admitted to Science Seminar. For the first hour of these meetings, a scientist from the community speaks to seminar members about his/her work. The second hour consists of meetings between students and their science project advisors. Many students have done well at the Regional Science Fair, State Science Fair, International Science and Engineering Fair, and other fairs. Science Seminar is presided over by Carol Sullivan, a longtime teacher at the school, as well as a variety of advisers who are current or retired scientists in the field.

=== Theater Arts ===
The Theater Company at Wachusett performed in the MHSDG One Act Play festival under the direction of Doug Ingalls for over 10 years, before his death in 2009, after which the school's Black Box Theater was renamed the Doug Ingalls Black Box Theater.

In 2003, Wachusett had its first ticket to the final round in Boston with Beyond Tolerance. This was followed in 2004 with Tom Jones, in 2005 with Medea, in 2007 with For Whom The Southern Belle Tolls, and in 2008 with "The Magdalene Laundries," an original play written by Ingalls. Many awards and honors were achieved throughout the competitions, and the company continues to be one of the best performing and well known drama departments in the state.

=== Wachusett's Film Directors Guild ===
WFDG (often pronounced "woofdige") is WRHS's filmmaking club. Club members participate in many film-related activities including, but not limited to, the production of short films. Group formation, plot creation, casting, and shooting must be completed using in-camera editing during a single club meeting. The films are screened at the next club meeting. Many club members organize the Wachusett Community Film Festival. Members of the Wachusett community may submit films to the festival.

== Notable alumni ==
- Adrian Ballinger, mountain climber
- Colin Bennie, distance runner
- Brooke "Brookers" Brodack, believed to be the first performer discovered on YouTube and offered a contract by mainstream media
- Roy D. Buol, mayor of Dubuque, Iowa
- Daniel Colman, professional poker player
- Jay Cutler, professional bodybuilder and Mr. Olympia titlist
- Lewis Evangelidis, former member of the Massachusetts House of Representatives, and Worcester County sheriff
- Burt Grinstead, professional actor
- Jill Lepore, Harvard professor, historian, and prolific author on American history and culture
- Todd Richards, former professional snowboarder and Olympic athlete
- Mike Smith, track and field coach
