= Montachusett Regional Vocational Technical School =

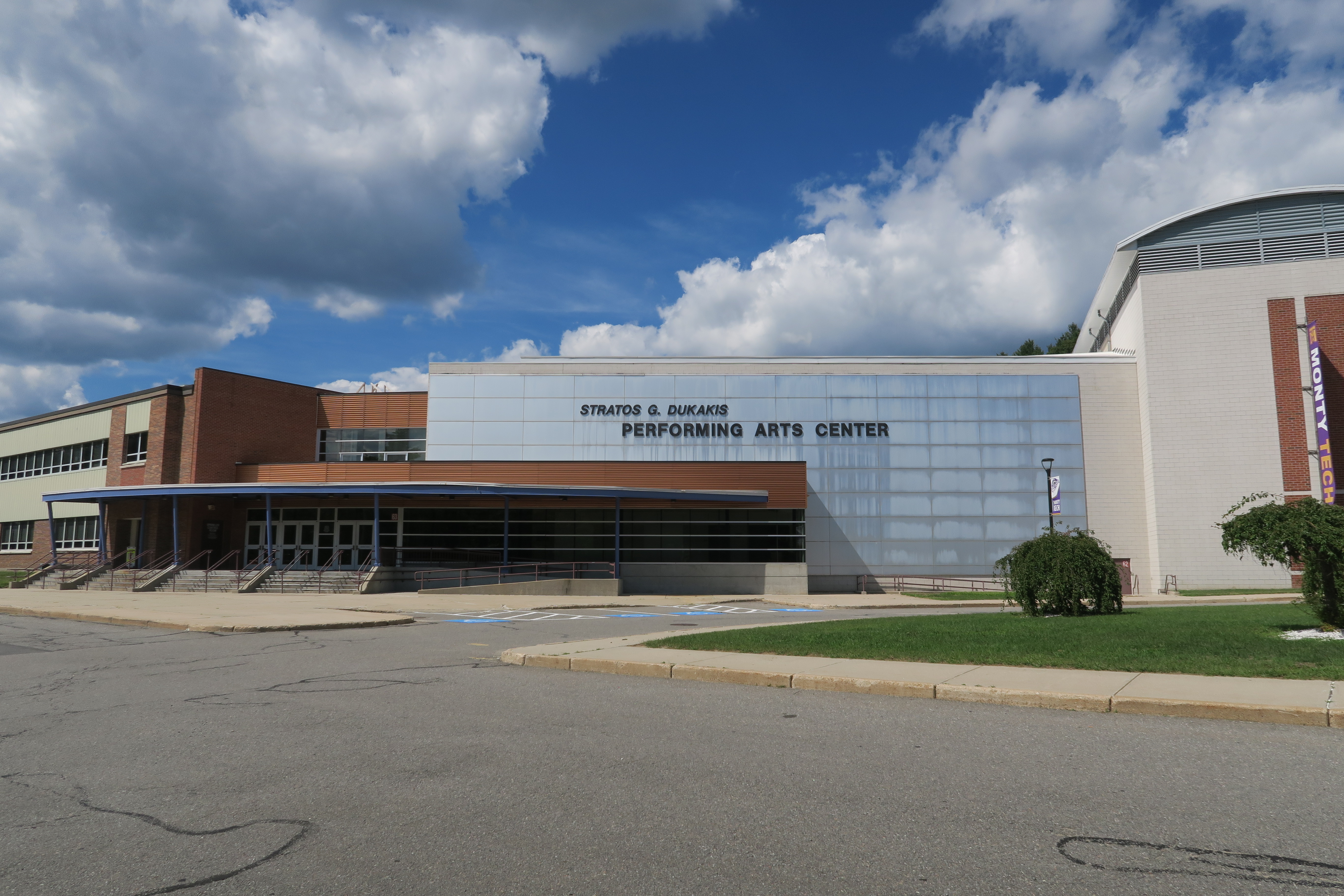
- Performing Arts Center

Location
- 1050 Westminster Street; Fitchburg, Massachusetts 01420; United States
- Coordinates: 42°33′38″N 71°51′38″W

Information
- Other name: Monty Tech
- Type: Public, secondary, vocational, open enrollment
- Established: 1965
- School district: Montachusett Regional Vocational Technical School District
- Superintendent: Thomas Browne
- NCES School ID: 250805002279
- Principal: Diana Carlson
- Teaching staff: 119.0 (on an FTE basis)
- Grades: 9–12
- Enrollment: 1,417 (2024-2025)
  - Grade 9: 354
  - Grade 10: 357
  - Grade 11: 361
  - Grade 12: 345
- Student to teacher ratio: 11.9
- Colors: Purple and gold
- Athletics conference: Central Massachusetts Athletic Conference
- Mascot: Bulldog
- Nickname: Monty Tech
- Accreditation: New England Association of Schools and Colleges
- Budget: $34,817,665 total; $23,913 per pupil (2023)
- Communities served: Ashby, Ashburnham, Athol, Barre, Fitchburg, Gardner, Harvard, Holden, Hubbardston, Lunenburg, Petersham, Phillipston, Princeton, Royalston, Sterling, Templeton, Westminster, Winchendon
- Website: www.montytech.net

Montachusett Regional Vocational Technical School, also known as Monty Tech, is a grade 9 (age 14–15) to grade 12 (age 17–18) public, secondary, vocational, open enrollment school in Fitchburg and Westminster, Massachusetts, United States. It provides training in 21 different trades and is the second largest vocational-technical school in Massachusetts.

The school is operated by the Montachusett Regional Vocational Technical School District, consisting of 18 towns, mainly in Worcester County. The school includes a childcare center, a restaurant, and a veterinary clinic. It also includes a performing arts center named after former Superintendent-Director Stratos G. Dukakis.

== History ==
On November 2, 1965, voters in ten Massachusetts communities approved a referendum to form the Montachusett Regional Vocational Technical School District, including the cities of Fitchburg and Gardner, as well as the towns of Royalston, Winchendon, Ashburnham, Ashby, Barre, Phillipston, Hubbardston, Holden, Princeton, and Lunenburg. By the end of November, voters in Sterling and Westminster had also voted to join the regional school.

On July 18, 1966, the architecture firm of Korslund, LeNormand, and Quann of Norwood was selected to design the new school's facilities. School construction was approved by Gov. Francis Sargent in 1969, authorizing a bond issue. Six years in planning and construction, the Montachusett Regional Vocational Technical School was approved for occupancy and opened its doors to about 600 students in September 1971. By October 1974, enrollment had increased to 990 students, with 26% female students.

In 1988 the Business Education Enrichment Fund was formed, which later became The Monty Tech Foundation. That year, the Fund held the first gala Superintendent's Dinner, a major fundraising event.

The School Committee approved a bond issue in 1996 for major renovation and modernization. On May 17, 2000, the school dedicated the $17 million state-of-the-art addition, including the performing arts center, new gym and new classrooms.

Accredited by the New England Association of Schools and Colleges, Montachusett Regional Vocational Technical School was last evaluated in April 2016, and the Committee's report is posted on the school's website.

== Curriculum ==
Monty Tech offers 21 programs that meet the definition of vocational-technical education contained in Massachusetts General Law Chapter 74 that also are approved by the Department of Elementary and Secondary Education:

1. Veterinary Science
2. Automotive Collision Repair "Auto Body"
3. Automotive Technology
4. HVAC/Property Maintenance
5. Business Technology
6. Cabinetmaking
7. House Carpentry
8. Cosmetology
9. Culinary Arts
10. Dental Assisting
11. CAD/Drafting and Design
12. Early Childhood Education
13. Electrical
14. Engineering Technology
15. Graphic Communications
16. Health Occupations,
17. Advanced Manufacturing
18. Masonry
19. Welding and Metal Fabrication
20. Plumbing
21. Information Technology.

The school also emphasizes coursework in academic subjects. From 2007 to 2014, student performance on the Massachusetts Comprehensive Assessment System rose in English language arts from 65% to 95%, and in mathematics, from 62% to 74%. The school had developed data teams of instructors who analyzed the results and made changes in educational strategies, also promoting collaboration between academic and vocational courses. In addition to hiring more tutors and expanding tutoring hours, the school has also hired teaching coaches who help with lesson plans, and building curriculum. For the 2024-2025 school year, the average student/teacher ratio was 11.9, the same as the statewide average of 11.9.

Monty Tech maintains articulation agreements with 9 post-secondary institution partners: Ben Franklin Institute of Technology, Johnson and Wales University, Newbury College, Vermont Technical College, Massachusetts Community Colleges, University of Northwestern Ohio, and New England Institute of Technology.

== Extra-curricular projects ==
=== Robotics team ===
Monty Tech is home to multiple VEX Robotics teams: teams 562A, 562B, and 562C, known as S.P.A.R.K. The team consists of about 17 Monty Tech students and one instructor. The team regularly attends and has competed in robotics competitions since 2001.

=== SSEP ===
In 2011, students from Monty Tech became the first vocational-technical participants in the Student Spaceflight Experiment Program, and designed experiments to be conducted on the International Space Station. A total of 9 experiments have been conducted including some milestone flights on the final Space Shuttle Atlantis and the first SpaceX commercial rocket.

=== MCJROTC ===
In 2002 Monty Tech established a Marine Corps Junior Reserve Officer's Training Corps (MCJROTC) Unit. In 2019 enrollment was over 190 students in grades 9 through 12. Monty Tech's MCJROTC unit's Cyber Security team has won national recognition at the Air Force Association's national youth challenge competition Cyber Patriot.

== Athletics ==
Montachusett Regional Vocational Technical School is a member of the Central Massachusetts Athletic Conference, which is in District 2 of the Massachusetts Interscholastic Athletic Association (MIAA). The school offers the following MIAA-sanctioned Varsity sports during their respective seasons, as well as Freshman and Junior Varsity teams in multiple sports:

- Football
- Cheerleading
- Soccer (boys and girls)
- Cross country (boys and girls)
- Field hockey
- Golf
- Volleyball (boys and girls)
- Basketball (boys and girls)
- Ice hockey (boys and girls)
- Indoor track (boys and girls)
- Wrestling
- Swimming (boys and girls, co-op with the Gardner Wildcats)
- Baseball
- Softball
- Track and field
- Lacrosse (boys and girls)
- Tennis
