= Aurelius Dwight Parker =

American politician (1802–1875)

Personal details
- Born: April 23, 1802 Princeton, Massachusetts, U.S.
- Died: June 18, 1875 (aged 73) Boston, Massachusetts, U.S.
- Education: Yale College; Litchfield Law School
- Occupation: Politician; lawyer

Aurelius Dwight Parker (April 23, 1802 – June 18, 1875) was an American politician and lawyer from Massachusetts.

== Early life ==
Aurelius Dwight Parker was born on April 23, 1802, in Princeton, Massachusetts, to Mary (née Binney) and Ebenezer Parker. He graduated from Yale College in 1826. He began studying law in the Litchfield Law School in 1826 and completed his preparation for admission to the bar in the office of Samuel Hubbard, of Boston. He was admitted to the Suffolk bar in October 1829.

== Career ==
In 1830, Parker began practicing law in Boston. He did not appear in the court room often and spent more time as a chamber counsellor.

Parker was a member of the city's school committee. He served as a member of the Massachusetts Constitutional Convention of 1853. He served in the Massachusetts House of Representatives from 1852 to 1853.

== Personal life ==
Parker did not marry. He died of throat cancer on June 18, 1875, in Boston.
