= Wachusett Regional School District =

School district in Massachusetts, United States

Location
- 1745 Main Street, Jefferson, MA 01522

District information
- Type: Public school district
- Grades: PK–12
- Superintendent: Darryll McCall
- Deputy superintendent(s): Robert Berlo
- Schools: 13

Students and staff
- Enrollment: 7,298
- Teachers: 473.7
- Student–teacher ratio: 16:1

Other information
- Website: www.wrsd.net

Wachusett Regional School District was founded in 1955 and comprises the Massachusetts towns of Holden, Paxton, Princeton, Rutland, and Sterling. The district's central office is located in the Old Jefferson Elementary School in Jefferson, Massachusetts.

== Leadership ==
The district is led by Superintendent James Reilly and Assistant Superintendent Jon Krol.

== Schools ==
The district consists of 13 schools: one regional high school, three middle schools, six elementary schools, two K-8 schools and one early childhood center.

=== High school ===
- Wachusett Regional High School

=== Middle schools ===
- Central Tree Middle School
- Chocksett Middle School
- Mountview Middle School

=== Elementary schools ===
- Davis Hill Elementary School
- Dawson Elementary School
- Glenwood Elementary School
- Houghton Elementary School
- Mayo Elementary School
- Naquaq Elementary School

=== K-8 schools ===
- Paxton Center School
- Thomas Prince School

=== Early childhood education ===
- Early Childhood Center
