= Russell Corner Historic District =

Historic district in Massachusetts, United States

- U.S. National Register of Historic Places
- U.S. Historic district
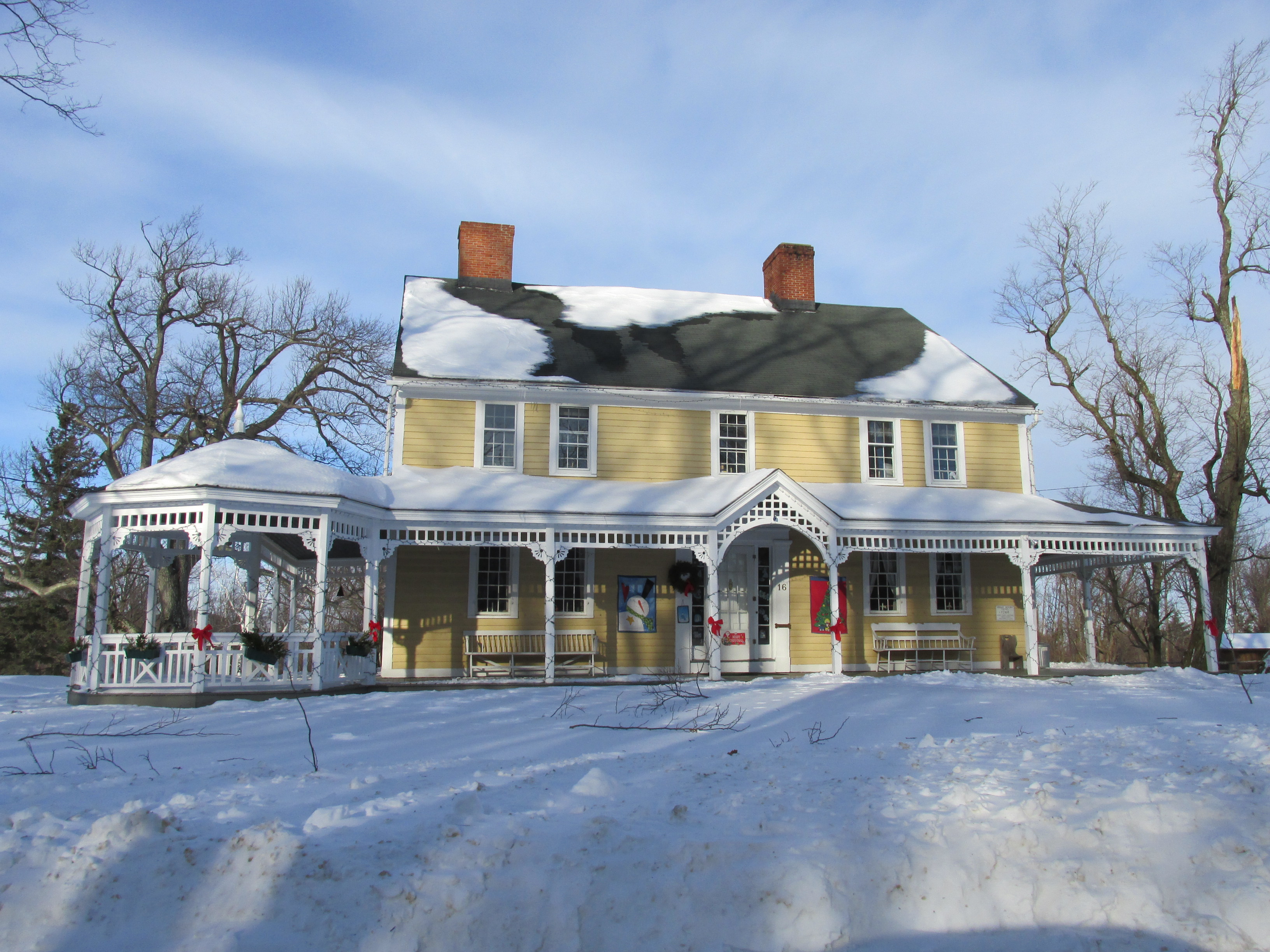
- Abijah Moore Tavern

- Location within Massachusetts Location within the United States
- Location: Princeton, Massachusetts
- Coordinates: 42°27′14″N 71°52′6″W
- Area: 124 acres (50 ha)
- Built: 1748
- Architectural style: Georgian, Federal
- NRHP reference No.: 06000060
- Added to NRHP: February 22, 2006

The Russell Corner Historic District of Princeton, Massachusetts encompasses a small 19th century commercial center that developed into a summer resort area by the early 20th century. Centered at the intersection of Merriam Road and Gregory Hill Road, the district includes fifteen contributing buildings on 124 acres (50 ha), which are predominantly residential in nature, and were mostly built before 1830. Some of the properties are found on East Princeton and Sterling Roads, and Bullock Lane. The district was listed on the National Register of Historic Places in 2006.

Both Merriam Road and Gregory Hill Road have been major transportation routes through Princeton; Merriam Road in particular was laid out in part along a Native American path in the mid-17th century. The oldest building in the district is the c. 1748 house of Abijah Wood at 16 Merriam Road, a Georgian house with a late-19th-century wraparound porch. The second house was built c. 1760, probably by Peter Goodnow; portions of this house survive in the building at 49 Gregory Hill Road. John Russell moved to the area in 1787, and soon afterward opened a tavern and inn. His son Charles was an energetic farmer and shopowner who was also active in the town and church; it is for him the area is named. In part through the economic activity of the Russells, a small cluster of houses and businesses arose.

The village came to include a schoolhouse in 1810 (now at 43 Gregory Hill Road), and by 1830 eight buildings stood near the intersection, all but one of which still stand. The village was largely bypassed by the resort hotel developments that grew in other parts of Princeton, but smaller scale development of summer residences, including conversion of some of the older buildings, took place in Russell Corner.

== See also ==
- National Register of Historic Places listings in Worcester County, Massachusetts
