= Princeton, Massachusetts =

- Town
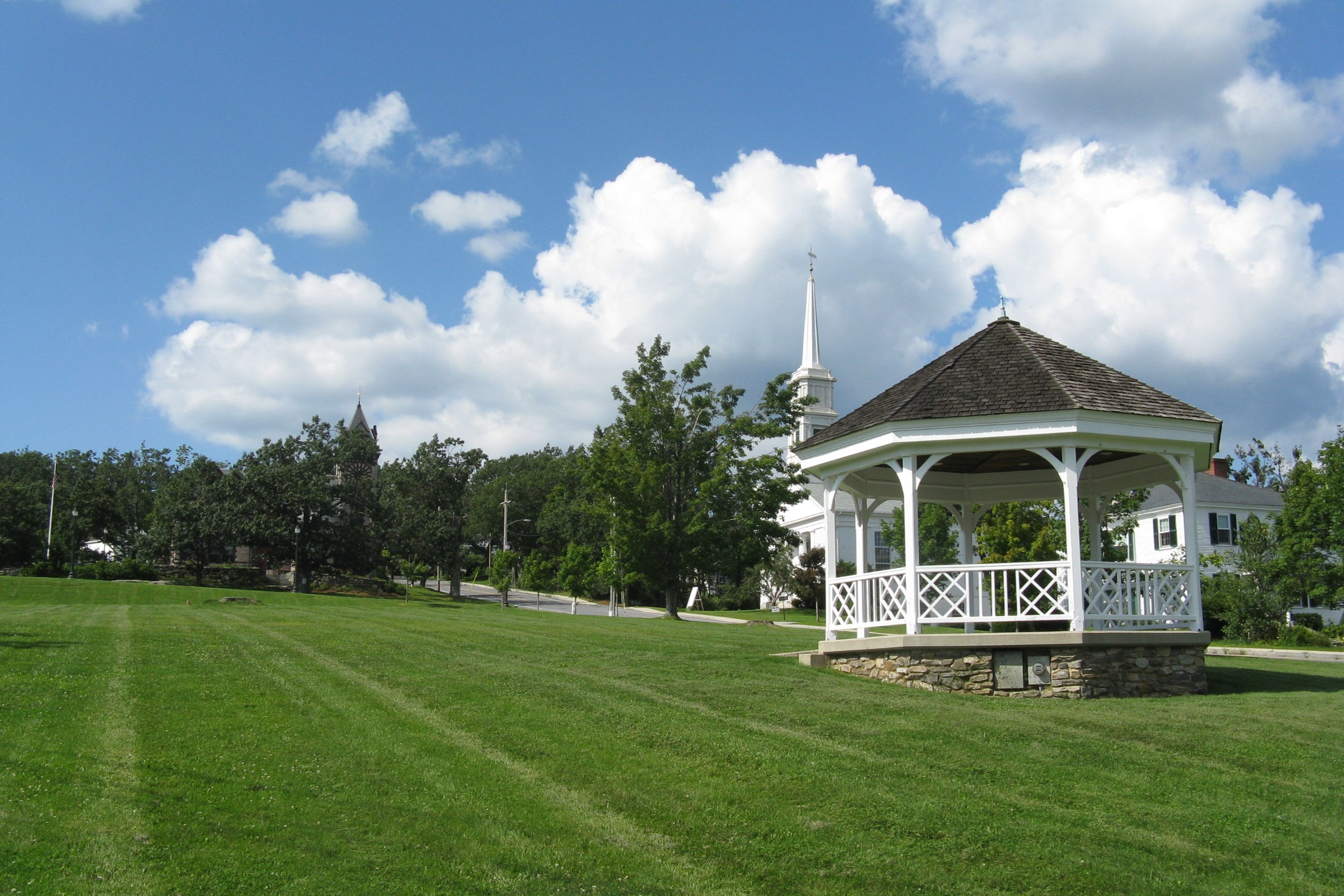
- Town Common in Princeton, MA

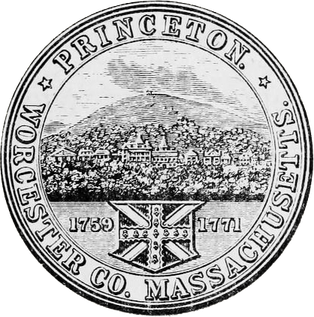
- Flag Seal

- Location in Worcester County and the state of Massachusetts.
- Coordinates: 42°26′55″N 71°52′40″W
- Country: United States
- State: Massachusetts
- County: Worcester
- Settled: 1743
- Incorporated: 1759

Government
  - Type: Open town meeting
  - Town Administrator: Sherry Patch
  - Board of Selectmen: Karen Cruise, Chair; Richard Bisk, Vice Chair; Robert Cumming, Member

Area
  - Total: 35.8 sq mi (92.8 km^{2})
  - Land: 35.4 sq mi (91.8 km^{2})
  - Water: 0.39 sq mi (1.0 km^{2})
- Elevation: 1,175 ft (358 m)

Population (2020)
  - Total: 3,495
  - Density: 98.6/sq mi (38.1/km^{2})
- Time zone: UTC−5 (Eastern)
  - Summer (DST): UTC−4 (Eastern)
- ZIP Code: 01541
- Area code: 351/978
- FIPS code: 25-55395
- GNIS feature ID: 0618380
- Website: town.princeton.ma.us

Princeton is a town in Worcester County, Massachusetts, United States. It is bordered on the east by Sterling and Leominster, on the north by Westminster, on the northwest by Hubbardston, on the southwest by Rutland, and on the southeast by Holden. The preeminent landmark within Princeton is Mount Wachusett, which straddles the line between Princeton and Westminster but the entrance to which is within Princeton. According to tradition, in 1675, Mary Rowlandson was ransomed upon Redemption Rock, now within the town of Princeton, by King Philip. The population was 3,495 at the 2020 census. Princeton is a rural exurb, serving as a bedroom commuter town for nearby cities such as Worcester, Gardner, and Boston.

== History ==
During King Philip's War in 1676, Native Americans brought their captive Mary Rowlandson to Princeton to release her to the colonists at Redemption Rock. The town of Princeton was incorporated in 1759, out of land that was previously part of Rutland. It was named after the Rev. Thomas Prince. In 1810, it annexed a piece of Hubbardston, and in 1870, it annexed a piece of Westminster.

=== Register of Historic Places ===
Princeton has five entries on the National Register of Historic Places:

- East Princeton Village Historic District: Roughly Main St., Leominster Rd. (added April 18, 2004)
- Fernside-Vacation House for Working Girls: 162 Mountain Rd. (added July 27, 2002)
- Princeton Center Historic District: Jct. of Hubbardston and Mountain Rds. (added March 26, 1999)
- Russell Corner Historic District: Merriam, Gregory Hill, East Princeton and Sterling Rds, Bullock Lane, (added February 22, 2006)
- West Village Historic District: Jct. of Allen Hill and Hubbardston Roads
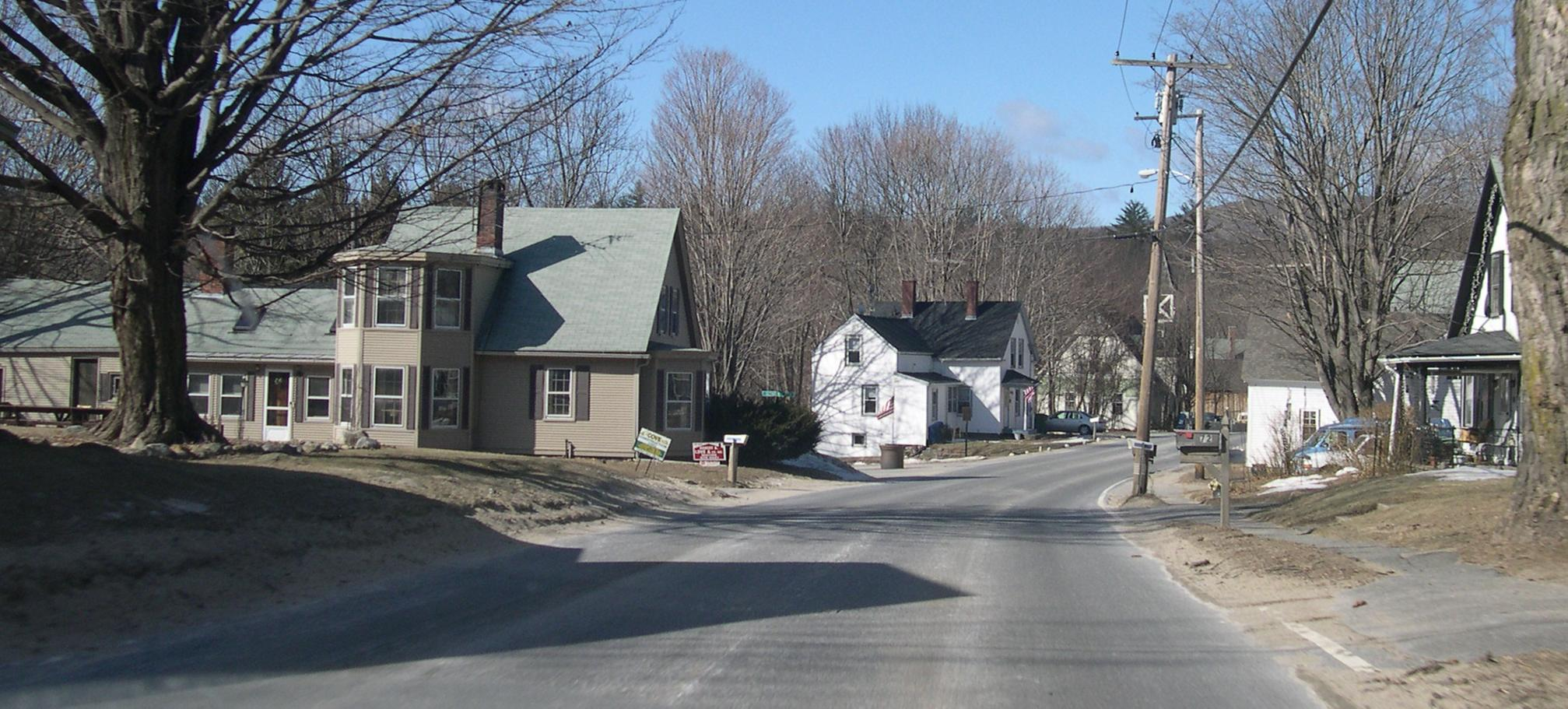
East Princeton Village Historic District along Route 140

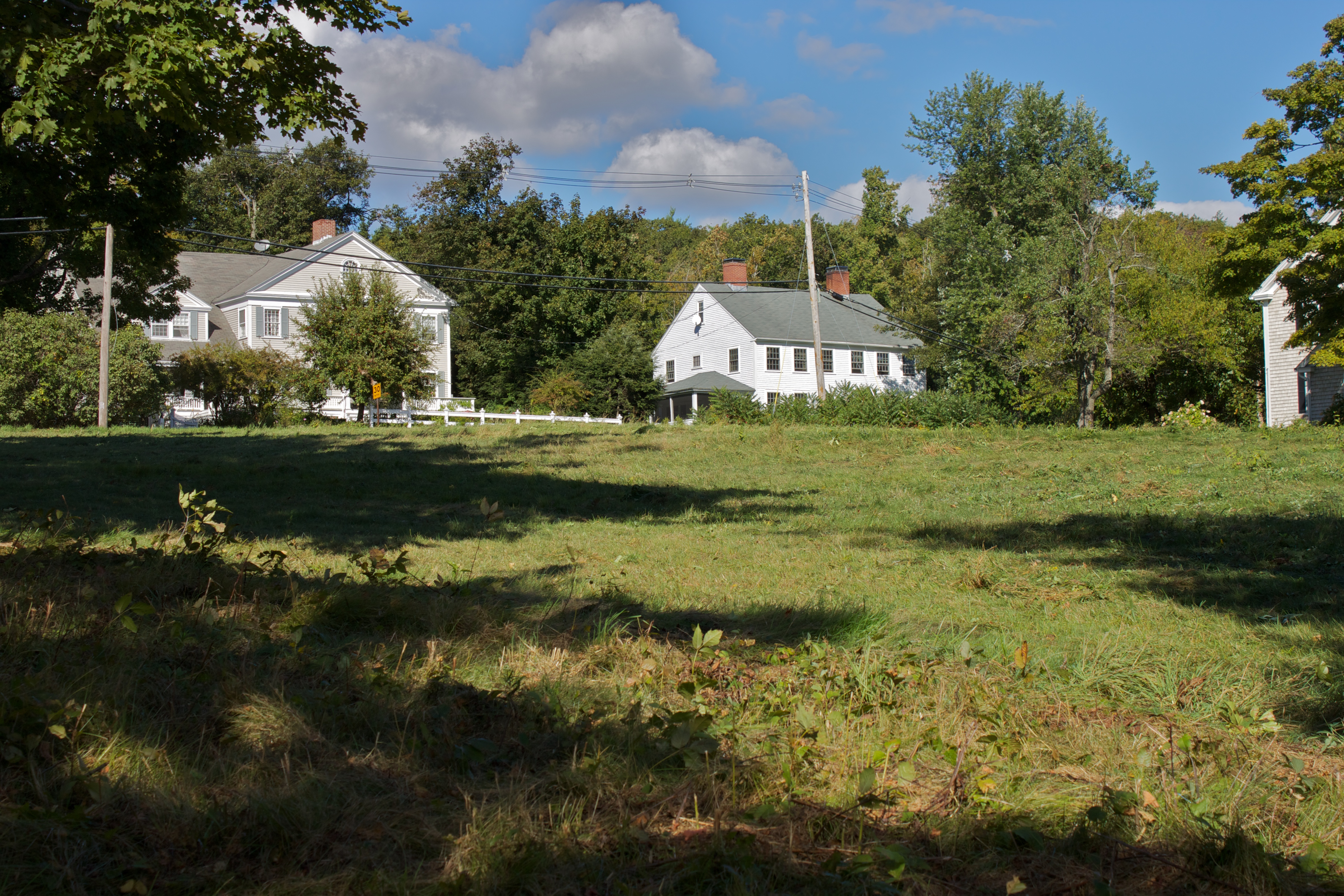
West Village Historic District

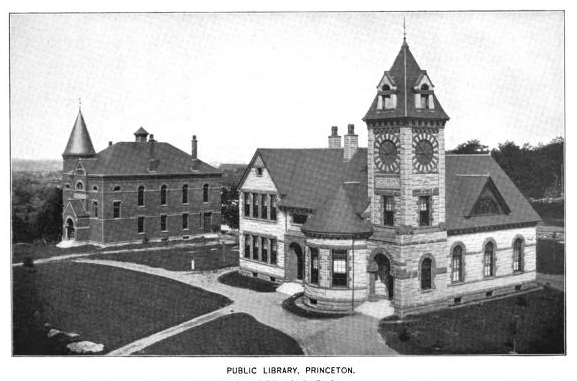
Princeton Public Library at right and Bagg Hall (town hall) at left, 1899

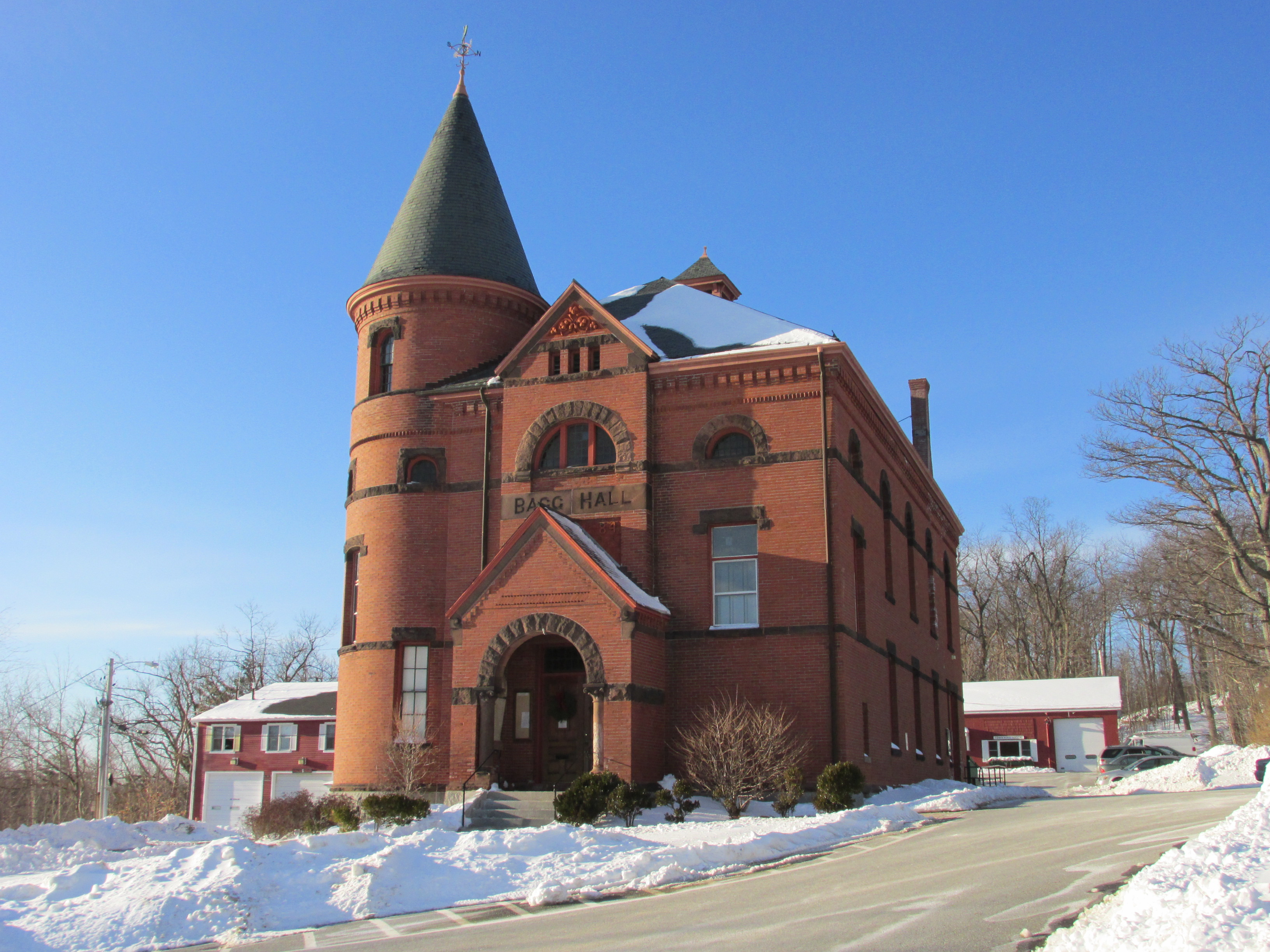
Bagg Hall, the town hall of Princeton

== Geography ==
According to the United States Census Bureau, the town has a total area of 35.8 square miles (93 km^{2}), of which, 35.4 square miles (92 km^{2}) of it is land and 0.4 square miles (1.0 km^{2}) of it (1.12%) is water.

== Demographics ==
Historical population
Year	Pop.	±%
1790	1,016	—
1850	1,318	+29.7%
1860	1,201	−8.9%
1870	1,279	+6.5%
1880	1,100	−14.0%
1890	982	−10.7%
1900	975	−0.7%
1910	818	−16.1%
1920	682	−16.6%
1930	717	+5.1%
1940	713	−0.6%
1950	1,032	+44.7%
1960	1,360	+31.8%
1970	1,681	+23.6%
1980	2,425	+44.3%
1990	3,189	+31.5%
2000	3,353	+5.1%
2010	3,413	+1.8%
2020	3,495	+2.4%
2024*	3,597	+2.9%
* = population estimate. Source: United States census records and Population Estimates Program data.

As of the census of 2000, there were 3,353 people, 1,166 households, and 959 families residing in the town. The population density was 94.6 inhabitants per square mile (36.5/km^{2}). There were 1,196 housing units at an average density of 33.7 per square mile (13.0/km^{2}). The racial makeup of the town was 96.75% White, 0.30% African American, 0.33% Native American, 0.95% Asian, 0.63% from other races, and 1.04% from two or more races. Hispanic or Latino of any race were 1.46% of the population.

There were 1,166 households, out of which 41.9% had children under the age of 18 living with them, 74.7% were married couples living together, 5.1% had a female householder with no husband present, and 17.7% were non-families. Of all households, 13.5% were made up of individuals, and 5.0% had someone living alone who was 65 years of age or older. The average household size was 2.87 and the average family size was 3.18.

In the town, the population was spread out, with 28.9% under the age of 18, 4.8% from 18 to 24, 27.8% from 25 to 44, 29.9% from 45 to 64, and 8.5% who were 65 years of age or older. The median age was 40 years. For every 100 females, there were 102.0 males. For every 100 females age 18 and over, there were 97.3 males.

The median income for a household in the town was $120,559, and the median income for a family was $152,884. The per capita income for the town was $54,940. About 2.7% of families and 4.4% of the population were below the poverty line, including 5.3% of those under age 18 and 9.3% of those age 65 or over.

== Government ==
State government
State Representative(s):	Kimberly Ferguson (R)
State Senator(s):	Harriette L. Chandler (D-1st Worcester district)
Governor's Councilor(s):	Jen Caissie (R)
Federal government
U.S. Representative(s):	James P. McGovern (D-2nd District),
U.S. Senators:	Elizabeth Warren (D), Ed Markey (D)

== Education ==
=== Schools ===
Princeton is part of the Wachusett Regional School District.

The Thomas Prince School serves as the town's kindergarten, elementary and middle school (K–8).

Wachusett Regional High School (traditional public high school) in Holden, MA and Montachusett Regional Vocational Technical School (vocational/technical high school) in Fitchburg, MA are the two public high schools serving the town of Princeton.

Princeton is served by Mount Wachusett Community College, whose main campus is located in Gardner, Massachusetts.

=== Library ===
The Princeton Public Library was established in 1884. In fiscal year 2008, the town of Princeton spent 1.6% ($129,243) of its budget on its public library; approximately $37 per resident, per year ($45.31 adjusted for inflation to 2021).

== Points of interest ==
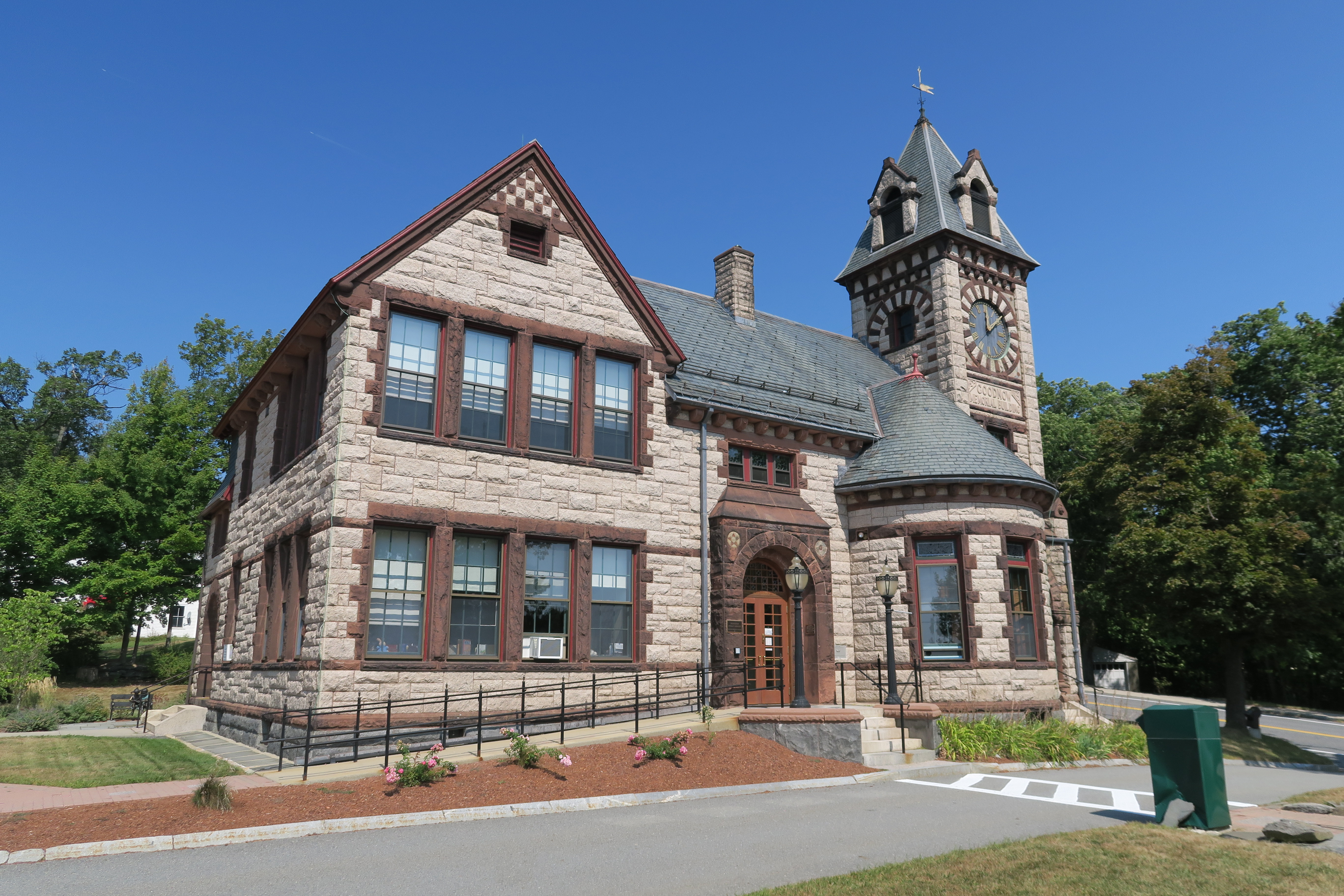
Princeton Public Library

- Cornerstone Ranchers
- Harrington Farm
- Mount Wachusett
- Princeton Historical Society
- Wachusett Meadow Wildlife Sanctuary
- Wachusett Mountain Ski Area
- Wachusett Mountain State Reservation
- Redemption Rock
- Hubbard farm

== Notable people ==
- Colin Bennie, distance runner
- Ward Nicholas Boylston (1747–1828), gentleman, businessman, and philanthropist, lived in Princeton from September 1804 until his death. He bequeathed $1000 to the town of Princeton for its church and minister and the support of indigent and deserving widows and orphan children
- Daniel Davis Jr. (1813–1887) - inventor
- Moses Gill (1734–1800), Massachusetts lieutenant governor and acting governor
- Louise H. Gregory (1880–1954), professor of zoology at Barnard College
- Ruth Ellen Grout (1901–1998), health education professor at the University of Minnesota
- Ezra Heywood (1829–1893), anarchist, slavery abolitionist, and feminist
- Vanessa Marcotte (1989–2016), murder victim, whose case attracted national media attention
- Aurelius Dwight Parker (1802–1875), lawyer and politician
- Edward Savage (1761–1817), portrait artist, engraver, and early museum proprietor

== Film references ==
- The 2001 film Shallow Hal had scenes shot in Princeton at Wachusett Mountain.
- The 2006 film The Legend of Lucy Keyes is a movie about Princeton and its old legend, about four-year-old Lucy Keyes, who follows her sisters to fetch some water from Wachusett Lake but vanishes and never returns to the house. Her mother, Martha, spends night and day looking for her and calling her name. Some believe Lucy and her mother Martha still haunt on and around Wachusett Mountain.
