= Thomas Prince (historian) =

American clergyman, scholar and historian (1687-1758)

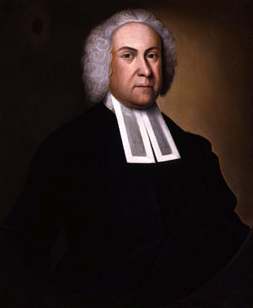
- Portrait by Joseph Badger ca.1750 (courtesy American Antiquarian Society)
- Born: May 15, 1687; Sandwich, Massachusetts
- Died: August 22, 1758 (aged 71); Boston, Massachusetts
- Education: Harvard University
- Occupation: Clergyman
- Partner: Deborah Denny
- Children: Sarah Prince
- Writing career
- Genre: Historical non-fiction
- Notable works: A Chronological History of New England, in the Form of Annals

Signature
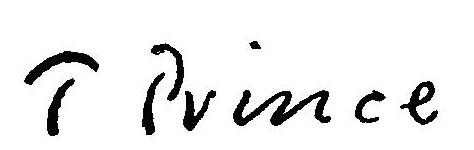

Thomas Prince (May 15, 1687 – August 22, 1758) was a New England clergyman, scholar and historian noted for his historical text A Chronological History of New England, in the Form of Annals. Called 'an American pioneer in scientific historical writing', Prince influenced historians such as Jeremy Belknap and Thomas Hutchinson, and his Annals was still being used as a reference text as late as 1791.

== Early life, education and travels ==
He was the fourth child of Samuel Prince Esq. and Mercy Hinkley, and entered Harvard University in 1703, graduating with a B.A. in 1707. While at Harvard his interest in books was sparked after he

chanced in my leisure Hours to read Mr. Chamberlain's Account of the Cottonian Library: Which excited in me a Zeal of laying hold on every Book, Pamphlet, and Paper, both in Print and Manuscript which are either written by persons who lived here, or that have any Tendency to enlighten our History" and began the formation of his "New England Library.

After graduation he began teaching in Sandwich, MA while working on his M.A, which was granted in absentia in 1710 a year after he had begun travelling. He spent 2 years travelling to places such as the West Indies and Madeira before travelling to England in 1711 and preaching in Combs, Suffolk. While in England, he gathered texts on the subject of early American history, hoping to write a book on the topic, but looking after the church and local citizens did not leave him enough time to do so. He returned to Boston in 1717, homesick, and traveled with Deborah and her brother Samuel Denny, members of the congregation at Combs. He married Deborah on October 30, 1719; they had four daughters and a son. He was ordained as a minister on October 1, 1718 by Dr. Joseph Sewell, and became the pastor for Old South Church, a position he retained until his death.

== A Chronological History of New England, in the Form of Annals ==
In 1728 Prince began work on a A Chronological History of New England, in the Form of Annals, a history of New England beginning with the 6th day of creation. He became interested in such a project after, during his travels, he found 'the want of a regular history of this country everywhere complained of' and in an effort to preserve the contents of various texts, some of which by then had already been destroyed. This was such a momentous project that it took him until 1736 to finish the first volume, which covered events up to September 7, 1630 and had to be cut short after the publisher informed him that the book was becoming too large to be effectively published. The volume had poor sales, which is attributed to the lack of need for a text of such detail at that time and the lack of interest in a text 'written for a higher purpose than to amuse its reader'. Despite the lack of interest in the text Prince continued to work as a second volume, releasing it in three parts going up to 1633, each costing sixpence. Due to lack of further interest in the text this format was discontinued. Prince's work is noted for its accuracy, with Prince saying that “I cite my vouchers to every passage, and I have done my utmost, first to find out the truth, and then to relate it in the clearest order. I have laboured after accuracy; and yet I dare not say that I am without mistake; nor do I desire the reader to conceal any he may possibly find.”

== As a clergyman ==
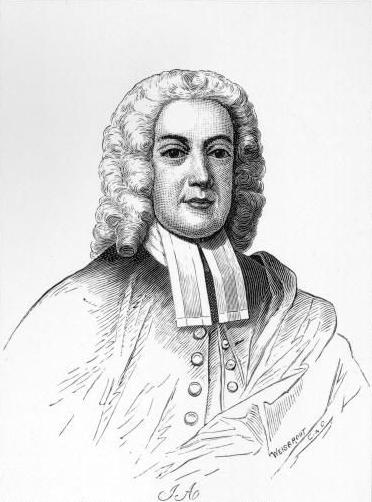

Prince, a noted preacher presented a sermon at his own ordination which was said to be "a wonderful production." He was given several offers from various churches in New England upon his return, but chose to settle in Boston as pastor of Old South Church. In the 1740s he was a great supporter of the First Great Awakening, inviting George Whitefield to preach in Boston in September 1740. In an age of increasing religious skepticism, Prince attempted to reconcile scientific theories with orthodox theology, evident in writings such as Earthquakes the Works of God, & Tokens of His Just Displeasure and An Account of a Strange Appearance in the Heavens, a description of the Aurora Borealis he witnessed while in England.

He created the Christian History, a periodical in 1743 to report on the revivals sweeping Europe and the American colonies, with his son Thomas Prince Jr. acting as editor, although the periodical only ran for two years. Printed by Samuel Kneeland, the publication is notable as the first such Christian periodical to be created. In 1743 he wrote An Account of the Revival of Religion in Boston in the Years 1740-1-2-3, an account of the revival of Christianity in Boston linked in part to his support of the Great Awakening. Prince's primary critic was Thomas Fleet a printer and newspaper publisher who emerged on the scene as Prince's nemesis during the public debates over religious revivalism.

== Legacy ==
Coat of Arms of Thomas Prince

As well as the obvious collection of books, Thomas Prince also left an intellectual legacy. Dr. Charles Chauncy, a frequent ideological opponent of Prince, said after his death that "He possessed all the intellectual powers in a degree far beyond what is common. He may be justly characterized as one of our great men ... [and] deserves to be remembered with honour." His reliance on primary sources and meticulous checks of factual accuracy also makes his Annals a key historical work, one which is still in print today.

The town of Princeton, Massachusetts was named after Prince due to his high standing within the local community and his ownership of part of the land used to form the town, which was given to him in 1727 as part of the will of Cyprian Stevens; the Thomas Prince School, a school within the town, is also named after him. A printing company named after him (the Prince Association) was also formed in 1858.

The Thomas Prince Collection, belonging to Old South Church and deposited at the Boston Public Library includes, in addition to Thomas Prince's personal library, a copy of the 1640 Bay Psalm Book as well as John Eliot’s Indian Bible of 1663), and a collection of Prince's personal correspondence.

The Prince Society (est.1858), described in "The Cambridge History of English and American Literature" as "one of the most honoured of American historical organizations" is also named after him.

== Works ==
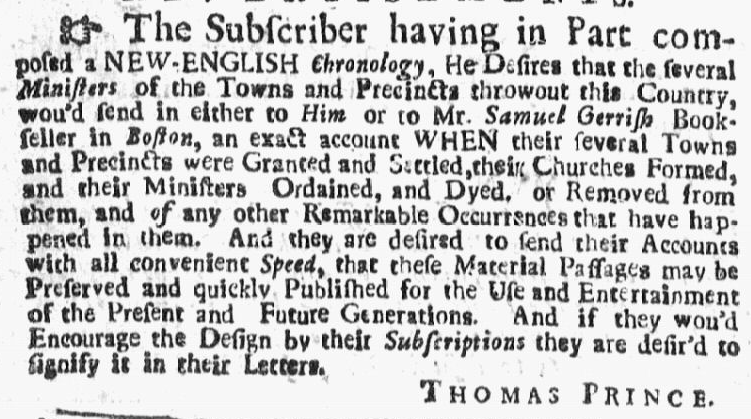
Request for historical information from Thomas Prince, 1728

- The Massachuset Psalter - 1709 with Experience Mayhew
- An Account of a Strange Appearance in the Heavens - 1717
- Account of the English Ministers at Martha's Vineyard - 1727
- Earthquakes the Works of God, & Tokens of His Just Displeasure - 1727
- A Sermon on the Death of Cotton Mather - 1728
- Memoirs - 1731
- The Vade Mecum for America: or, A Companion for Trades and Travellers (travel guide) - 1731
- Chronological History of New England, in the Form of Annals. Boston: Printed by Kneeland & Green for Samuel Gerrish, 1736
- A Thanksgiving Sermon occasioned by the Capture of Louisburg - 1745
- Earthquakes of New England - 1751
- The New England Psalm-Book, Revised and Improved - 1758

== See also ==
- Old South Meeting House
