= East Princeton Village Historic District =

Historic district in Massachusetts, United States

- U.S. National Register of Historic Places
- U.S. Historic district
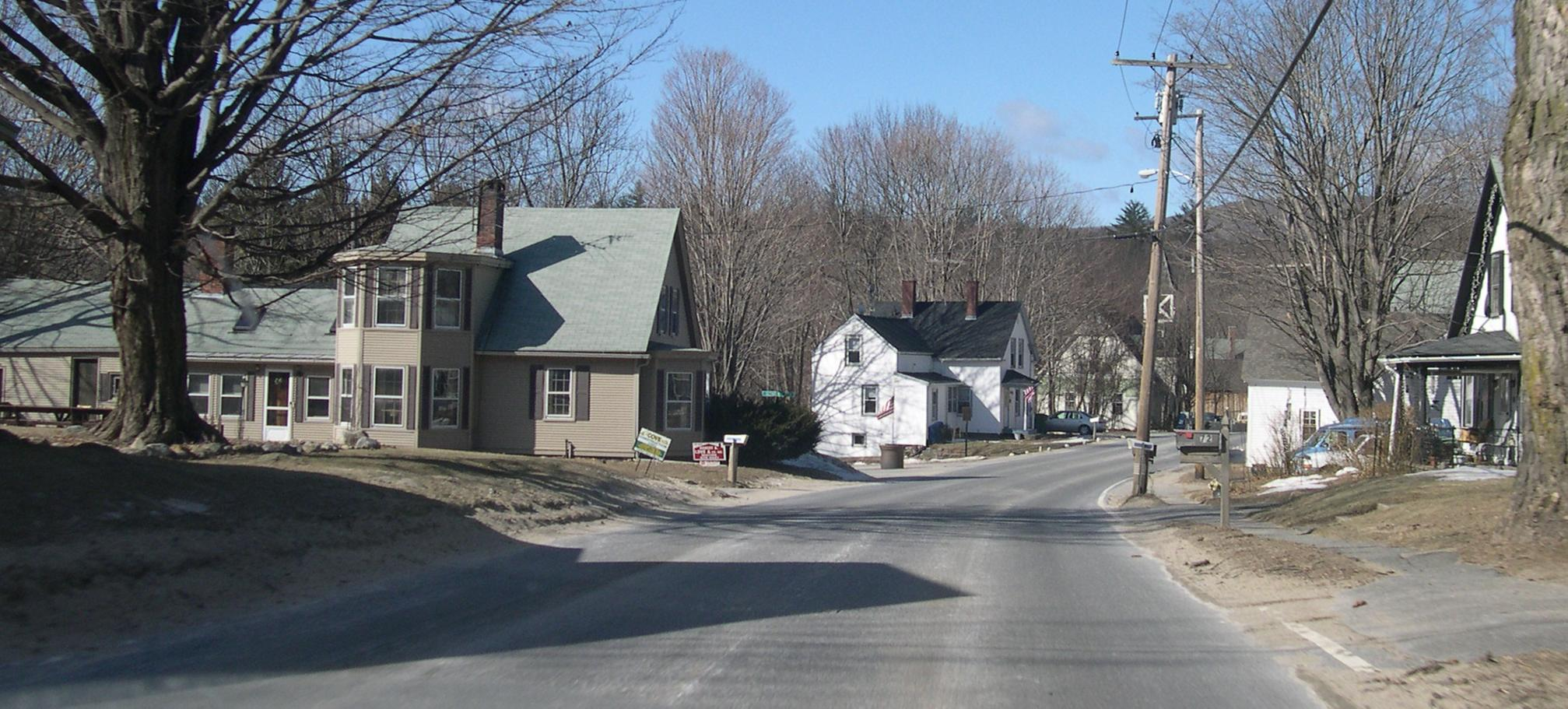

- Location within Massachusetts Location within the United States
- Location: Princeton, Massachusetts
- Coordinates: 42°28′23″N 71°50′14″W
- Area: 200 acres (81 ha)
- Built: 1781
- Architect: Mirick, John Fremont
- Architectural style: Federal, Mid 19th Century Revival
- NRHP reference No.: 04000188
- Added to NRHP: March 18, 2004

The East Princeton Village Historic District is a historic district encompassing a 19th-century industrial village center in Princeton, Massachusetts. It is situated along Main Street between Beaman and Leominster Roads, extending slightly along Leominster and Gleason Roads. The village developed around the Keyes Brook, which powered mills in the mid-19th century, including the Stuart Chair Factory established in 1841.

The district was listed on the National Register of Historic Places in 2004.

== See also ==
- National Register of Historic Places listings in Worcester County, Massachusetts
