= Holden, Massachusetts =

- Town
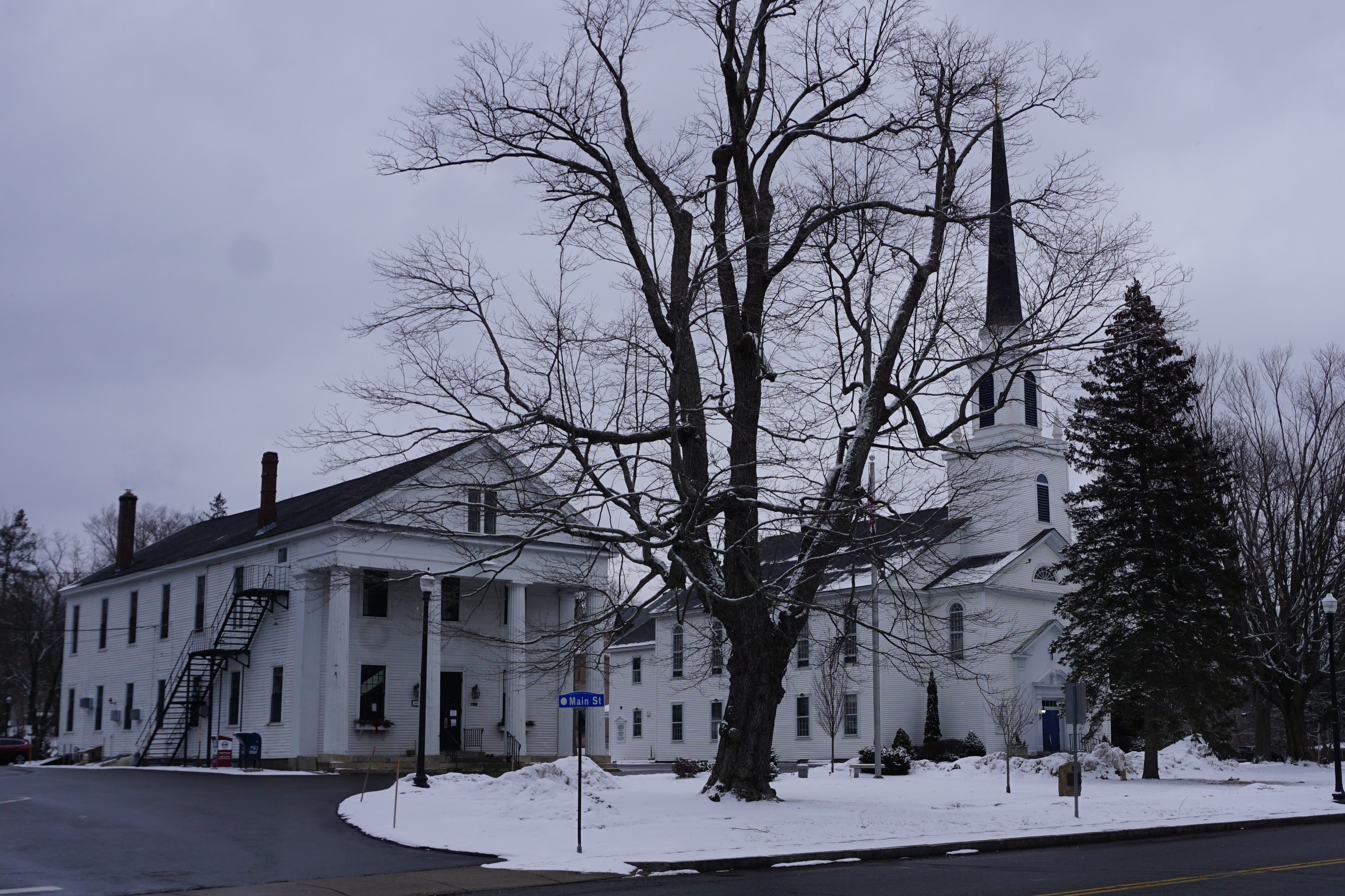
- Holden Center

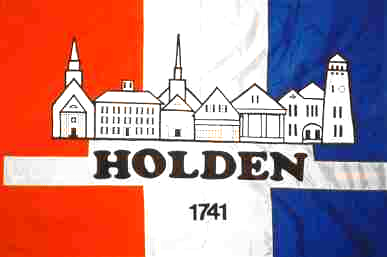
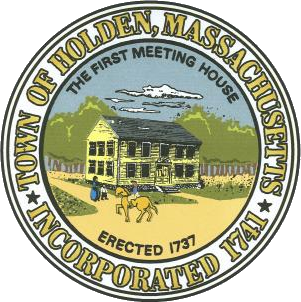
- Flag Seal

- Location in Worcester County and the state of Massachusetts.
- Coordinates: 42°21′06″N 71°51′50″W
- Country: United States
- State: Massachusetts
- County: Worcester
- Settled: 1723
- Incorporated: 1741

Government
  - Type: Open town meeting
  - Town Manager: Peter Lukes
  - Board of Selectmen: Stephanie Mulroy; Richard Bates; Anthony M. Renzoni; Geraldine A. Herlihy; Thomas Curran

Area
  - Total: 36.2 sq mi (93.8 km^{2})
  - Land: 35.0 sq mi (90.6 km^{2})
  - Water: 1.2 sq mi (3.2 km^{2})
- Elevation: 860 ft (262 m)

Population (2020)
  - Total: 19,905
  - Density: 569/sq mi (220/km^{2})
- Time zone: UTC−5 (Eastern)
  - Summer (DST): UTC−4 (Eastern)
- ZIP Codes: 01520 (Holden); 01522 (Jefferson)
- Area code: 508/774
- FIPS code: 25-30560
- GNIS feature ID: 0618365
- Website: www.holdenma.gov

Holden is a town in Worcester County, Massachusetts, United States. The town was founded in 1741, on All Hallow's Eveand the Town Square (Center, Common) was donated by John Hancock, former Governor of Massachusetts. The population was 19,905 at the 2020 census. It includes the village of Jefferson.

== History ==
Holden was named for Samuel Holden, a director of the Bank of England.

== Geography ==
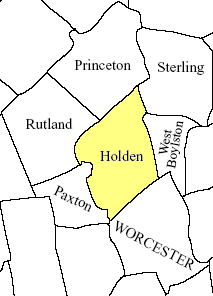

According to the United States Census Bureau, the town has a total area of 36.2 square miles (94 km^{2}), of which 35.0 square miles (91 km^{2}) is land and 1.2 square miles (3.1 km^{2}), or 3.40%, is water. The landscape is compiled of hills and rivers, including the Quinapoxet.

Holden is bounded on the west by Rutland, on the northwest by Princeton, on the east by Sterling and West Boylston, on the southeast by Worcester, and on the southwest by Paxton.

== Demographics ==
Historical population
Year	Pop.	±%
1790	1,077	—
1850	1,933	+79.5%
1860	1,945	+0.6%
1870	2,062	+6.0%
1880	2,499	+21.2%
1890	2,623	+5.0%
1900	2,464	−6.1%
1910	2,147	−12.9%
1920	2,970	+38.3%
1930	3,871	+30.3%
1940	3,924	+1.4%
1950	5,975	+52.3%
1960	10,117	+69.3%
1970	12,564	+24.2%
1980	13,336	+6.1%
1990	14,628	+9.7%
2000	15,621	+6.8%
2010	17,346	+11.0%
2020	19,905	+14.8%
2024*	20,326	+2.1%
* = population estimate. Source: United States census records and Population Estimates Program data.

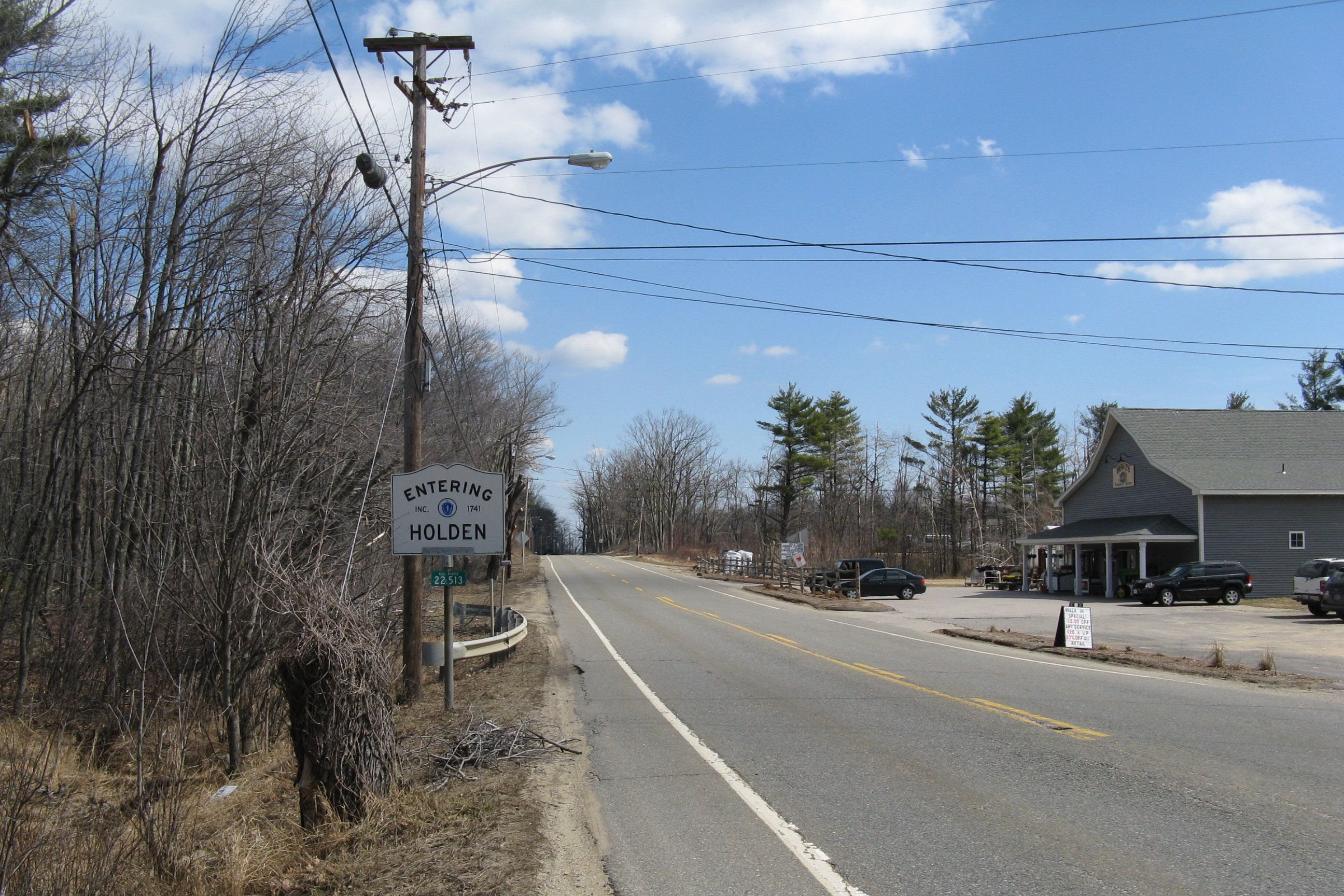
Entering Holden eastbound on Route 122A

As of the census of 2020, there were 19,905 people, 7,251 households, and 5,457 families residing in the town. The population density was 568.7 inhabitants per square mile (219.6/km^{2}). There were 7,439 housing units at an average density of 212.5 per square mile (82.0/km^{2}). The racial makeup of the town was 87.71% White, 2.09% African American, 0.15% Native American, 3.49% Asian, 0.01% Pacific Islander, 1.36% from other races, and 5.19% from two or more races. Hispanic or Latino of any race were 4.17% of the population.

There were 7,251 households, out of which 35.7% had children under the age of 18 living with them, 62.4% were married couples living together, 11.4% had a male householder with no spouse present, 21.1% had a female householder with no spouse present, and 24.7% were non-families. 20.4% of all households were made up of individuals, and 10.8% had someone living alone who was 65 years of age or older. The average household size was 2.71 and the average family size was 3.18.

In the town, the population was spread out, with 24.0% under the age of 18, 7.0% from 18 to 24, 22.4% from 25 to 44, 28.2% from 45 to 64, and 18.4% who were 65 years of age or older. The median age was 42.3 years. For every 100 females, there were 94.4 males. For every 100 females age 18 and over, there were 92.1 males.

The median income for a household in the town was $111,960, and the median income for a family was $131,744. Males had a median income of $77,926 versus $48,578 for females. The per capita income for the town was $49,245. About 2.9% of families and 4.6% of the population were below the poverty line, including 3.7% of those under age 18 and 7.5% of those age 65 or over.

== Government ==
State government
State Representative(s):	Kimberly Ferguson (R)
State Senator(s):	Peter J. Durant (D-Worcester and Hampshire district)
Governor's Councilor(s):	Paul DePalo (D)
Federal government
U.S. Representative(s):	James P. McGovern (D-2nd District)
U.S. Senators:	Elizabeth Warren (D), Ed Markey (D)

== Education ==
=== Schools ===
Holden is part of the five-town Wachusett Regional School District that includes the neighboring towns of Paxton, Princeton, Rutland, and Sterling. The towns share the newly renovated Wachusett Regional High School. Wachusett was the first regional school district in Massachusetts.

Holden has three elementary schools: Davis Hill Elementary, Dr. Leroy E. Mayo Elementary, and Dawson Elementary. The town is served by Mountview Middle School for grades 6–8 which was newly built in 2016. High school students may choose to attend Wachusett Regional High School in Holden or Montachusett Regional Vocational Technical School ("Monty Tech") in Fitchburg.

Holden also serves as the hometown for Holden Christian Academy, a PS–8 private Christian school.

=== Library ===
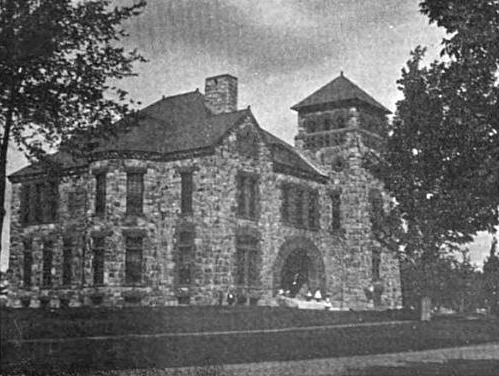
Holden public library, 1891

The Holden public library first opened in 1888. In fiscal year 2008, the town of Holden spent 1.99% ($679,756) of its budget on its public library—approximately $40 per person, per year.

== Points of interest ==
- Alden Research Laboratory
- The Mass Central Rail Trail, a partially completed shared-use rail trail extending across Massachusetts between Northampton and Boston.
- Steel rotating boom, for testing of hydraulic meters, an ASME historic landmark
- Holden Reservoir; a 2026 survey conducted by The Landmark indicated a 54% majority of local residents being opposed to the construction of a data center on reservoir grounds

== Notable people ==
- Dan Colman, professional poker player, the winner of $40,000,000 Big One for One Drop
- Lewis Evangelidis, Worcester County sheriff and former MA state representative
- Ron Hallstrom, NFL football player for the Green Bay Packers and Philadelphia Eagles
- Matthew Quick, author of The Silver Linings Playbook and Boy 21
- Fran Quinn, professional golfer
- Tyler Rand, American arts executive
- Bruce Taylor, former pitcher for the Detroit Tigers
