= West Village Historic District (Princeton, Massachusetts) =

Historic district in Massachusetts, United States

- U.S. National Register of Historic Places
- U.S. Historic district
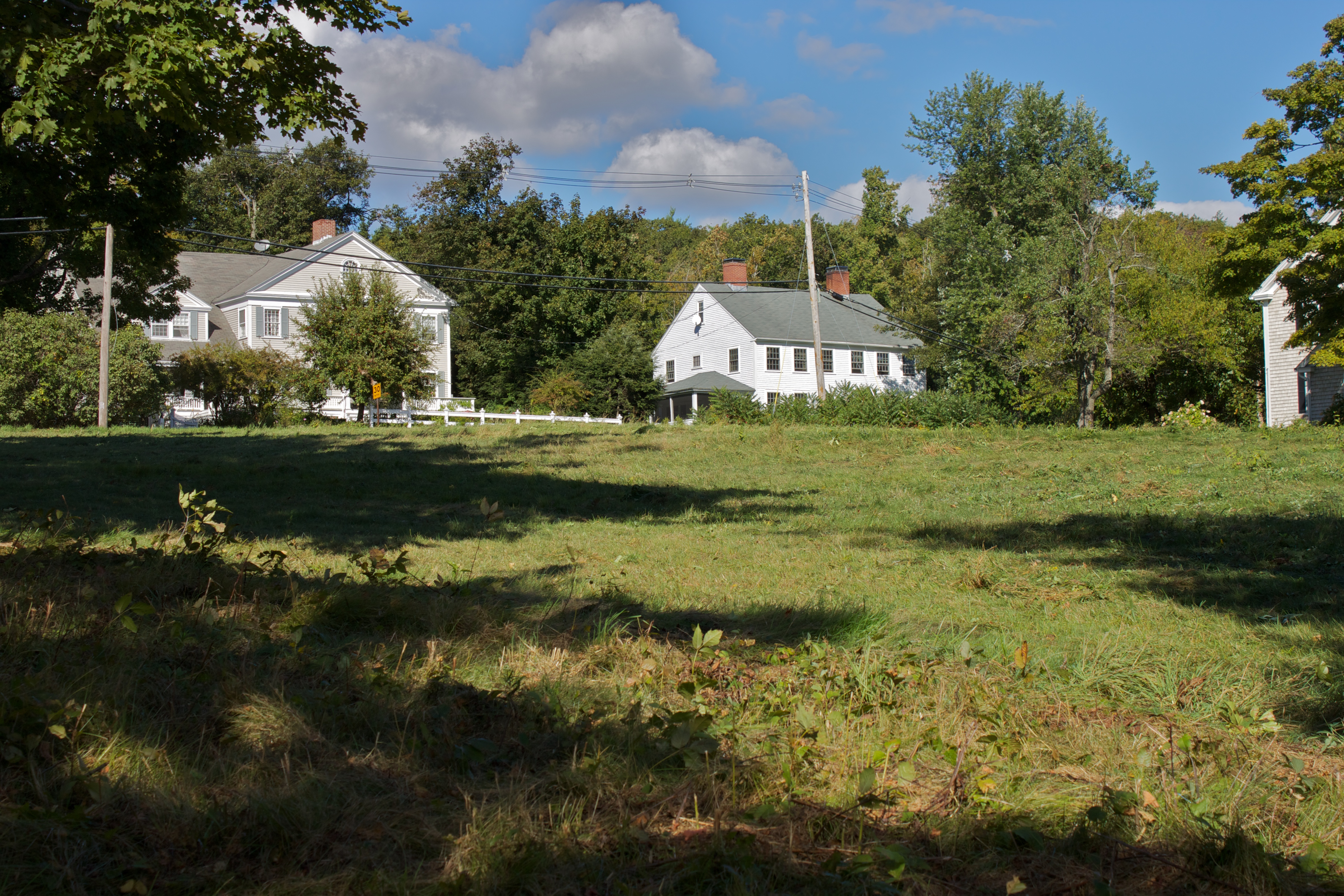

- Location within Massachusetts Location within the United States
- Location: Allen Hill, Goodnow, Hubbardston, and Radford Rds., Princeton, Massachusetts
- Coordinates: 42.451°N 71.88769°W
- Area: 465 acres (188 ha)
- Built: 1807
- Built by: Fay, Silas Jr.; et al.
- Architectural style: Colonial, Federal
- NRHP reference No.: 09000827
- Added to NRHP: October 16, 2009

The West Village Historic District of Princeton, Massachusetts, encompasses the historic heart of its West Village (also variously known as "Pratt's Corner" and "Lower Village"). The 465-acre (188 ha) district abuts the Princeton Center Historic District to the east, and was listed on the National Register of Historic Places in 2009.

Although the district is located just west of Princeton's town center, it was originally rural in character, and only began to develop a separate village center on the junction that is now Hubbardston Road, Allen Hill Road, and Radford Road. The oldest properties in the district are colonial-era Georgian homes, while there are Greek Revival properties built in the village during a development phase in the early 19th century. In the second half of the 19th century the area began to develop as a resort area, and boarding houses and resort hotels were built. Development in the area declined significantly after c. 1920.

== See also ==
- National Register of Historic Places listings in Worcester County, Massachusetts
