= Rutland, Massachusetts =

- Town
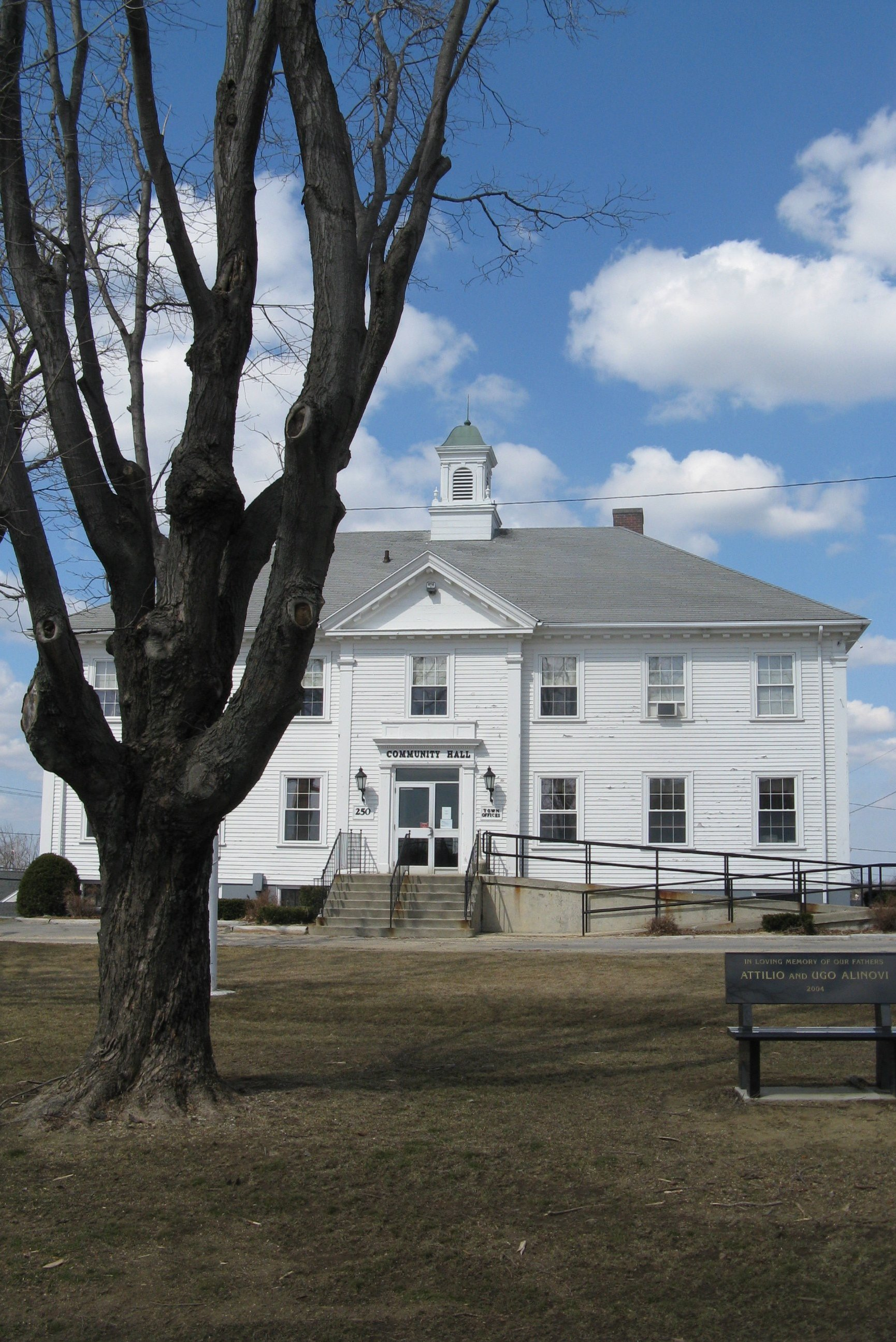
- Community Hall

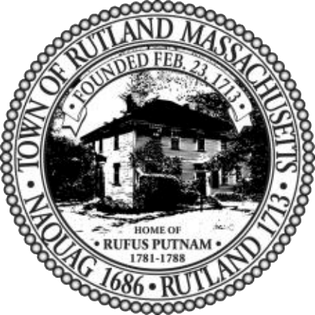
- Flag Seal
- Nickname: "Geographical Center of Massachusetts"
- Location in Worcester County and the state of Massachusetts.
- Coordinates: 42°22′10″N 71°56′55″W
- Country: United States
- State: Massachusetts
- County: Worcester
- Settled: 1686
- Incorporated: 1713

Government
  - Type: Open town meeting

Area
  - Total: 36.4 sq mi (94.3 km^{2})
  - Land: 35.3 sq mi (91.3 km^{2})
  - Water: 1.2 sq mi (3.0 km^{2})
- Elevation: 1,112 ft (339 m)

Population (2020)
  - Total: 9,049
  - Density: 257/sq mi (99.1/km^{2})
- Time zone: UTC−5 (Eastern)
  - Summer (DST): UTC−4 (Eastern)
- ZIP Code: 01543
- Area code: 508/774
- FIPS code: 25-58825
- GNIS feature ID: 0618381
- Website: www.rutlandma.gov

Rutland is a town in Worcester County, Massachusetts, United States. The population was 9,049 at the 2020 census. It contains the census-designated place of the same name. Rutland is the geographic center of Massachusetts; a tree, the Central Tree, located on Central Tree Road, marks the general spot.

== History ==
The town was first settled by Europeans in 1666 and was originally called "Naquag," a name which came from Nipmuc. Officially incorporated in 1713, the Town of Rutland was made up of Barre, Hubbardston, Oakham, Princeton, and the northern half of Paxton. In Northern Rutland there are prison camps used during the Revolutionary War used for captured Hessian mercenaries hired by the British. The town's most famous citizen is Rufus Putnam, who was George Washington's chief engineer in the American Revolutionary War. He held various town offices in Rutland and served as Representative to the General Court. Later, he led a group of Revolutionary War veterans west to settle in the Northwest Territory and Putnam became known as the "Father of Ohio." The Rufus Putnam House still stands, and is now a B&B. It is depicted on the town seal.

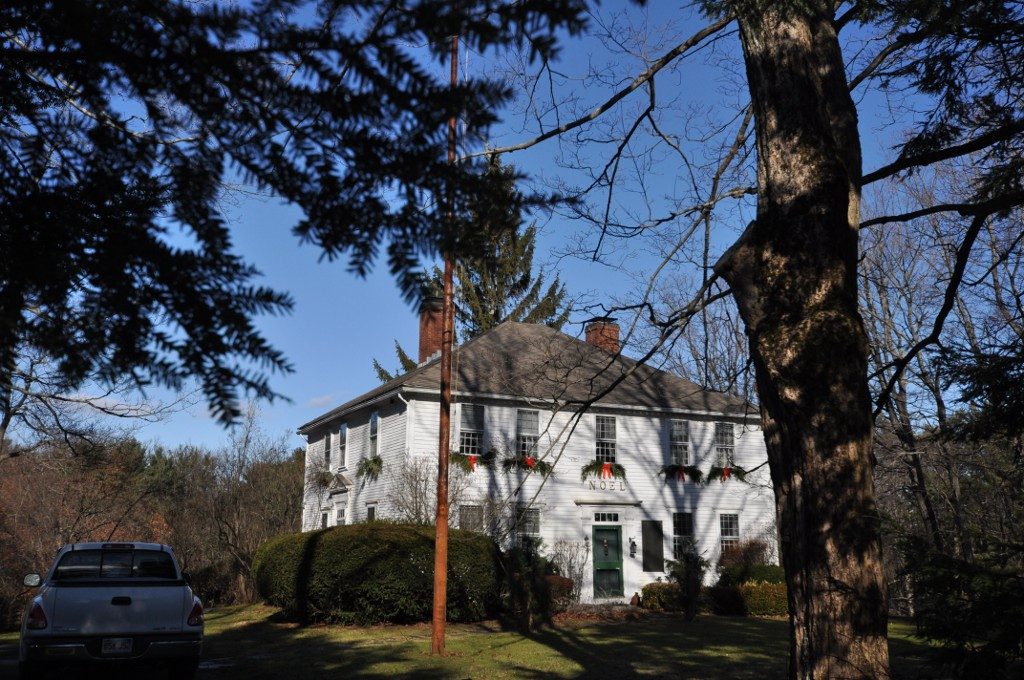
The General Rufus Putnam House.

Town house and school building, Rutland about 1908

== Geography ==
According to the United States Census Bureau, the town has a total area of 36.4 square miles (94 km^{2}), of which 35.3 square miles (91 km^{2}) is land and 1.1 square miles (2.8 km^{2}), or 3.16%, is water.

Rutland is bordered by Princeton on the northeast, Holden on the east, Paxton on the southeast, Oakham on the southwest, and Barre and Hubbardston on the northwest. Rutland has five villages within its limits: New Boston, West Rutland, Muschopauge, North Rutland, and Turkey Hill.

Rutland is approximately 13 miles (21 km) northwest of Worcester, 52 miles (84 km) west of Boston, and 181 miles (291 km) northeast of New York City. Rutland is the highest town between The Berkshires and the Atlantic. The town common is 1,200 feet (370 m) above sea level. Rutland is the geographical center of Massachusetts.

Rutland features multiple sections of the Mass Central Rail Trail a partially completed shared-use rail trail extending across Massachusetts between Northampton and Boston.

== Demographics ==
Historical population
Year	Pop.	±%
1790	1,072	—
1850	1,223	+14.1%
1860	1,076	−12.0%
1870	1,024	−4.8%
1880	1,059	+3.4%
1890	980	−7.5%
1900	1,334	+36.1%
1910	1,743	+30.7%
1920	1,743	+0.0%
1930	2,442	+40.1%
1940	2,181	−10.7%
1950	3,056	+40.1%
1960	3,253	+6.4%
1970	3,198	−1.7%
1980	4,334	+35.5%
1990	4,936	+13.9%
2000	6,353	+28.7%
2010	7,973	+25.5%
2020	9,049	+13.5%
2024*	9,637	+6.5%
* = population estimate. Source: United States census records and Population Estimates Program data.

As of the year 2008, there were approximately 8,257 people, 2,300 households, and 1,721 families residing in the town. The population density was 180.2 inhabitants per square mile (69.6/km^{2}). There were 2,392 housing units at an average density of 67.8 per square mile (26.2/km^{2}). The racial makeup of the town was 96.58% White, 1.04% Black or African American, 0.14% Native American, 0.46% Asian, 0.44% from other races, and 1.34% from two or more races. Hispanic or Latino of any race were 1.32% of the population.

There were 2,253 households, out of which 42.3% had children under the age of 18 living with them, 64.1% were married couples living together, 8.6% had a female householder with no husband present, and 24.8% were non-families. Of all households 19.9% were made up of individuals, and 6.6% had someone living alone who was 65 years of age or older. The average household size was 2.77 and the average family size was 3.21.

In the town, the population was spread out, with 30.8% under the age of 18, 6.1% from 18 to 24, 33.8% from 25 to 44, 21.7% from 45 to 64, and 7.7% who were 65 years of age or older. The median age was 35 years. For every 100 females, there were 102.1 males. For every 100 females age 18 and over, there were 95.6 males.

The median income for a household in the town was $62,846, and the median income for a family was $70,689. Males had a median income of $45,824 versus $35,390 for females. The per capita income for the town was $23,311. About 1.5% of families and 3.3% of the population were below the poverty line, including 2.0% of those under age 18 and 7.3% of those age 65 or over.

== Politics ==
State government
State Representative(s):	Kimberly Ferguson (R)
State Senator(s):	Peter Durant (R)
Governor's Councilor(s):	Paul DePalo (D)
Federal government
U.S. Representative(s):	James P. McGovern (D-2nd District),
U.S. Senators:	Elizabeth Warren (D), Ed Markey (D)

Internally, Rutland uses a town meeting style system of governance. As of 2019, the Board of Selectmen is composed of Lyndon S. Nichols, Jeffrey A. Stillings, Mitchell Ruscitti, Leah M. Whiteman, and Leroy "Skip" Clark. Terms for the board of selectmen are staggered.

== Arts and culture ==
Each year, Rutland holds a four-day-long Fourth of July celebration, beginning on July 1. Events include performances by area musicians, a lip-sync concert, chicken barbecue hosted by the local Fire Brigade, a Historical Society Lemonade Social, and an acclaimed fireworks show. On the Fourth, Rutland holds a parade with floats made by local organizations and special guests including local and regional politicians.

August also brings in the Central Tree Chowder Chili Challenge, an event hosted and sponsored by the Rutland Fire Brigade. Area restaurants compete for local bragging rights for having the best area clam chowder. With two ways to "win", restaurants compete for both the people's choice as well as the votes of their peers and competitors.

While the main draw to the day is the clam chowder, the event has evolved into a family-oriented day. There is no admission fee except for those who wish to sample the chowder. However, there are also pony rides, face painting, "exotic" animal exhibits, inflatable rooms for kids, a free "train ride" (a lawn tractor towing three cars around the local athletic track), as well as miscellaneous vendors, both local and from surrounding towns.

Proceeds go to the local Fire Brigade, which uses the money for restoration of the town's original fire station, and also to help supplement the expenses of the Fire Department by purchasing much needed equipment that would otherwise have to wait for town funding.

== Education ==
Rutland is a part of the Wachusett Regional School District.

There are two elementary schools; Naquag Elementary, which houses grades K through 2nd. The second elementary school is Glenwood Elementary, which contains grades 3rd through 5th.

Naquag Elementary is located on Main Street. As of the 2024–2025 school year, the school has 22 full-time teachers and 344 students.

The middle school in the town is Central Tree Middle School. Central Tree contains grades 6 through 8 and houses 365 students and 25 full-time teachers. The average reading and math proficiency in the school is above the state average with a 53% Reading proficiency and 41% Math proficiency.

The public high schools are Wachusett Regional High School in Holden, and Bay Path Regional Vocational Technical High School in Charlton.

Rutland is also home to the residential treatment facility, Devereux School. Devereux provides educational and psychological services to youth aged 6–21.

=== Library ===
The Rutland public library was founded c. 1865. In fiscal year 2008, the town of Rutland spent 1.16% ($159,360) of its budget on its public library—some $20.17 per person, per year ($26.58 adjusted for inflation to 2022).

== See also ==
- List of geographic centers of the United States
