= Mailloux =

Mailloux is a surname. Notable people with the surname include:

- Barry J. Mailloux (died 1982), Canadian computer scientist, editor and professor
- Cyprien O. Mailloux (1857–1932), Canadian-born American electrical engineer and inventor
- Élie Mailloux (1830–1893), Canadian politician
- Élodie Mailloux (1865–1937), Canadian nun and nursing school administrator
- Eugene Mailloux (1878–1929), Canadian businessman
- Pierre Mailloux (born 1949), Canadian psychiatrist and radio host
- Raymond Mailloux (1918–1995), Canadian politician

== See also ==
- Mailloux River, a tributary of the north shore of the St. Lawrence River, in La Malbaie, Charlevoix-Est Regional County Municipality, Capitale-Nationale, Quebec, Canada
- Mailloux, a term used by Saint Pierre and Miquelon Islanders to refer to expatriates from Metropolitan France
