= Aubuchon =

Aubuchon is a surname. Notable people with the name include:

- Chet Aubuchon (1916–2005), American basketball player
- Gary Aubuchon (born 1962), American real estate broker and Republican politician
- Jacques Aubuchon (1924–1991), American actor who appeared in films, stage, and on television in the 1950s, 1960s, 1970s, and 1980s.
- Oscar Aubuchon (1917–1970), Canadian ice hockey left winger
- Remi Aubuchon, American television writer and producer

== See also ==
- Aubuchon Hardware, hardware store chain in the northeastern United States
