= Pacific Coast Electric Transmission Association =

Defunct engineering institute in the United States

The Pacific Coast Electric Transmission Association was an American engineering institute founded in 1884 in response to the East coast establishment of the American Institute of Electrical Engineers. It published its proceedings in the journalist George P. Low's journal The Electrical Journal, later titled The Journal of Electricity and then The Journal of Electricity, Power, and Gas, and began annual meetings in 1898. The annual meeting acted as both an electrical industry conference and an academic conference in electrical engineering. It disbanded with the continuation of the AIEE to the West coast in or shortly after 1905.
