= Thomas Eckert =

American politician and army officer (1825–1910)

Thomas T. Eckert
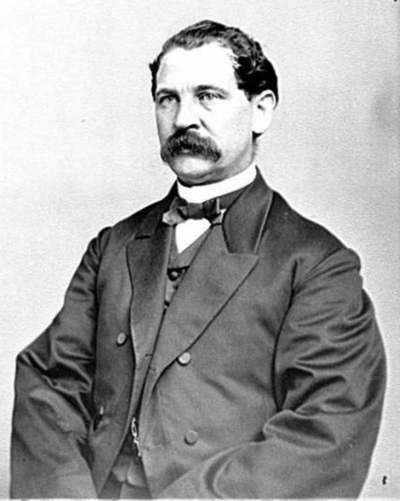
- 1860s portrait of Eckert
- Born: Thomas Thompson Eckert; April 23, 1825; St. Clairsville, Ohio, U.S.
- Died: October 20, 1910 (aged 85); New York City, New York, U.S.
- Burial place: St. Patrick's Old Cathedral, New York City
- Military career
- Allegiance: United States of America; Union
- Branch: Union Army
- Service years: 1861–1867
- Rank: Major; Brevet Brigadier General
- Commands: U.S. Military Telegraph Corps
- Conflicts: American Civil War
- Other work: Assistant Secretary of War; President, Western Union

Thomas Thompson Eckert (April 23, 1825 – October 20, 1910) was an officer in the U.S. Army, Chief of the War Department Telegraph Staff from 1862 to 1866, United States Assistant Secretary of War from 1866 to 1867 and an executive at Western Union.

== Early life ==
Thomas Thompson Eckert was born April 23, 1825, in St. Clairsville, Ohio. At a young age, he became interested in the use of the telegraph and the actions of Samuel F.B. Morse. Reading The National Intelligencer he became fascinated with the proceedings between Morse and Congress in which Morse was granted money to construct an experimental telegraph line. In 1847, after telegraph lines were built from New York to Washington, D.C., Eckert decided to travel to New York in order to see the Morse telegraph in action and became an operator with the Morse Telegraph Company. Eckert then returned home to Ohio and learned how to telegraph. When Eckert returned home, he took a job as an operator at the Wade Telegraph Company, which was owned by J.H. Wade. While working as one of Wade's operators in Wooster, Ohio, in 1849 Eckert was appointed local postmaster as well. Eckert combined these two jobs by connecting the telegraph wire to the post office. In 1852, Wade appointed Eckert to superintend the construction of a telegraph line between Pittsburg and Chicago on the Fort Wayne route. The lines under Eckert's management became part of the Union Telegraph Company, and his jurisdiction was substantially enlarged.

Eckert held this position as superintendent until 1859, when he moved to Montgomery County, North Carolina, to manage a gold mine. In 1861, Eckert returned to Ohio to bring his wife, Emma D. Whitney, and his children to North Carolina. But upon returning to the mines, Eckert found he had been accused of being a Northern spy. When his case was heard before a judge, the judge acquitted Eckert due to lack of proof. After the case, Eckert and his family escaped back north to Cleveland with the help of influential friends in 1861.

== Service during the Civil War ==
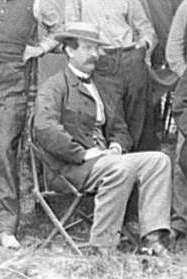
Major Thomas T. Eckert near Petersburg, Va., 1864.

After arriving in Cleveland, Eckert telegraphed Assistant Secretary of War Thomas A. Scott that his services were available. Eckert was ordered to Washington, D.C., and assigned to General George B. McClellan's headquarters as captain and aide-de-camp in charge of military telegraph operations, and accompanied him on the Peninsula Campaign as superintendent of the military telegraph for the Department of the Potomac. His service on the battlefield did not last long because in September 1862 he was sent to Washington, D.C., to organize and administer the War Department's military telegraph (a position he held until 1866) with the rank of major. Eckert and fellow telegraphers Charles A. Tinker and Albert Brown Chandler devised ciphers that enabled them to send and receive secret messages, and they became confidential telegraphers for Edwin Stanton and Abraham Lincoln. Eckert was well respected by Secretary of War Stanton and President Lincoln for his organizational skills; they charged him with important missions that went beyond Eckert's formal duties as a telegrapher. In 1864 Eckert was brevetted lieutenant colonel, and in 1865 he received brevets to colonel and brigadier general of volunteers. Later, Stanton went on to appoint him Assistant Secretary of War in 1866, a position Eckert held until 1867.

== After the war ==
Eckert resigned as Assistant Secretary of War and established himself as a major figure in the American telegraph industry. His first job after his resignation was managing the eastern division of Western Union. In 1875, he became president of the Atlantic and Pacific telegraph company, and then in 1880, Eckert became president of the American Union Telegraph, Western Union's main competitor. When Western Union and American Union Telegraph merged in 1881, Eckert was named vice president and general manager of the expanded Western Union. Eckert, in his role as vice president, was an integral part of Western Union's management and growth. In 1893, Eckert succeeded Dr. Norvin Green to become president of Western Union. He retired from this position in 1900 to become chairman of the board of directors, a position which he held until shortly before his death on October 20, 1910.

== In popular culture ==
- Eckert was portrayed by David Dastmalchian in the 2013 theatrical film Saving Lincoln.
- Eckert was portrayed by Damian O'Hare in the 2024 Apple TV+ miniseries series Manhunt.

Government offices
Preceded by Charles Anderson Dana	Assistant Secretary of War; 1866–1867	Succeeded by office abolished 1868-1890
Business positions
Preceded by Norvin Green	President of Western Union; 1893–1902	Succeeded by Robert Clowry
