= History of the Franco-Americans =

The flag of Franco-Americans

Alternate flag of French Americans.

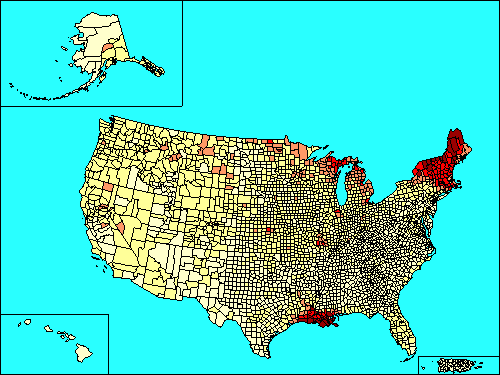
The current distribution of the Franco-American ethnic group in the United States today

The Franco-Americans, or French Americans, are a group of people of French and French-Canadian (Québécois and Acadian) descent living in the United States. Today there are 25.8 million Franco-Americans in the US (7.4% of US population) and 1.6 million Franco-Americans who speak French at home. In the 2020 United States census, French Americans (25.8 million) were the 4th most common ancestral group, following German Americans (45 million), Irish Americans (38.5 million), and Mexican Americans (37.4 million), and ahead of English Americans (25.5 million), based on the self-reporting ancestry data from the U.S. Census Bureau. There are also an additional 450,000 Americans who speak a French-based creole language, for example, Haitian Creole. Even though Franco-Americans are a substantial portion of the US population, they are generally less visible than other sizable ethnic groups. This is partly because of geographical dispersal (there are many regionally unique Franco-American groups, e.g. Louisiana Creole), and partly because a large proportion of Franco-Americans have acculturated or assimilated.

== Early Franco-American settlers ==
The flag of the Midwest Franco-Americans

The Franco-Americans were never part of the Franco-American alliance, an alliance made between Louis XVI and the United States during the American Revolutionary War.

=== Original settlers ===
Most Modern-day Franco-Americans of French Canadian or French heritage are the descendants of settlers who lived in Canada during the 17th century (Canada was known as New France at that time), Canada then came to be known as province of Québec in 1763, which then renamed to Lower Canada in 1791, and then to the Canadian Province of Québec after the Canadian Confederation was formed in 1867. The majority of Franco-Americans of French Canadian origin, mostly the ones living in New England and the Mid-West, are those whose origins trace back to that of the Quebec Diaspora, also, not that many Franco-Americans are of Acadian descent, who came to the US from the Canadian Maritime regions. What is unusual about the early Franco-Americans is that they arrived before the formation of the United States. In the time before the American Revolutionary War, they founded many villages and cities and were some of the first Europeans to settle down in the US. Places that were main settlements for Franco-American settlers include the Midwest and Louisiana. Franco-Americans today are found mostly in New England and in the northern sections of New York, the Midwest and Louisiana. There are three main types of French-American; French Canadian, Cajun, or Louisiana Creole.

=== Louisiana ===
During the period of French colonization in the Americas (1534–1763), France divided up all of its land into five territories; Canada (Providence of Quebec), Acadia, Hudson Bay, Newfoundland and Louisiana. In The Treaty of Utrecht, France ceded to Great Britain its claims over mainland Acadia, Hudson Bay, and Newfoundland. After this treaty the colony of Cape Breton Island was established as the successor to Acadia.

By 1679, La Louisiane française or French Louisiana was an administrative district of New France. Under French control from 1682 to 1762 and 1802 to 1804, the area was named after Louis XIV, by French explorer René-Robert Cavelier, Sieur de la Salle. It initially covered a vast territory that included most of the drainage basin of the Mississippi River and stretched from the Great Lakes to the Gulf of Mexico and from the Appalachian Mountains to the Rocky Mountains. Louisiana was split up into two regions, known as Upper Louisiana, Upper Louisiana's land began north of the Arkansas River, and Lower Louisiana. The modern U.S. state of Louisiana is after the historical region, although it occupies only a small portion of what it originally was meant to have.

French pioneers explored the area began during the reign of King Louis XIV, while French Louisiana was not greatly developed, due to the deficiency of human and financial resources. As the result of France's defeat in the Seven Years' War, France was forced, in 1763, to relinquish the eastern part of the territory to the victorious British, and the western regions to Spain as compensation for Spain's loss of Florida. Direct French colonization ended with this transfer of authority, but Louisiana nevertheless remained a refuge for forcibly displaced Acadians (The Expulsion of the Acadians), who were dispersed across the Thirteen Colonies. This population became what we know as the Cajuns.

France regained sovereignty of the western territory in the secret Treaty of San Ildefonso of 1800. But, strained by obligations in Europe, Napoleon Bonaparte decided to sell the territory to the United States in the Louisiana Purchase of 1803, ending France's presence in Louisiana.

=== Colonial-Era Migration to the Thirteen Colonies ===
In 1562 French naval officer Jean Ribault sailed with his fleet to the New World to found Fort Caroline, which is now Jacksonville, Florida. Fort Caroline was a haven for Huguenot culture (French Protestant). The Spanish, seeing the danger of these Protestant colonists killed Ribault and many of his followers in 1565. Stopped by the French government from establishing colonies in New France, a group of Huguenots, led by Jessé de Forest, sailed to North America and settled in the Dutch colony of New Netherland (later part of New York and New Jersey), as well as several British colonies including Nova Scotia. A number of New Amsterdam's main families were of Huguenot origin. In 1628 the Huguenots established a church congregation called L'Église française à la Nouvelle-Amsterdam, a predecessor of the still existing French Church du Saint-Esprit.

Having arrived in New Amsterdam, Huguenots were granted land directly across from the Manhattan settlers on Long Island for a permanent settlement and they also settled near the harbor Newtown Creek, they were the first Europeans to live in Brooklyn, then known as Boschwick, and today the neighborhood known as Bushwick.

== Later Franco-Americans ==
=== The Quebec diaspora ===
The current flag of Quebec

The Quebec diaspora, often called "grande saignée" (the great demographic hemorrhage), was a period of mass immigration of inhabitants of Quebec dispersing across North America. The Canadian immigrants emigrated to New England, New York State, the American Midwest, certain regions of Ontario, and to a lesser extent the Canadian Prairies. Though emigration from Quebec had begun much earlier, this phase started around 1840, reached its highest levels from the U.S. Civil War to the 1890s, and ended with the Great Depression in the 1930s. This chapter of Franco-American history has been surveyed and detailed by historians Gerard J. Brault, François Weil, Yves Roby, Armand Chartier, and David Vermette.

=== Immigration from Quebec to the United States ===
Historians have long debated the causes of mass immigration from the St. Lawrence River valley to the United States. Although some scholars may have exaggerated the extent of a wheat crisis in the early nineteenth century, Lower Canada suffered the ravages of Hessian fly, wheat midge, and potato rot in the 1830s and 1840s. Agricultural woes added to the structural challenge of population growth and limited access to arable land among young people. The decline of the fur trade and the crisis of the lumber trade in the 1840s narrowed opportunities for wage labor. In times of relative prosperity, economic growth did not benefit all regions, sectors, or ethnic groups equally. At the same time, French Canadians became more aware of American opportunities through the press, growing transportation and communication networks, and family members and neighbors who ventured abroad for short periods. Ultimately, despite efforts to stanch the flow of people and to repatriate migrants, approximately 900,000 French Canadians settled permanently south of the border.

Vermont and New York were among the first fields of migration for French Canadians. Their presence in these states is ascertained from the first decades of the nineteenth century—before the Patriot War. In the middle of the century, many French Canadians moved to northeastern Illinois, establishing such communities as Bourbonnais, St. Anne, St. Georges, Papineau, and L'Erable. Michigan and Minnesota also became important destinations for migrants. In the Northeast, American textile manufacturing and other industries broadened opportunities for French-Canadian immigrants. Destinations included Cohoes in New York; Lewiston in Maine; Fall River, Holyoke and Lowell in Massachusetts; Woonsocket in Rhode Island; and Manchester in New Hampshire. Amid poor living conditions and grueling work, large factories often provided work to the entire family, including children. Initially reluctant to support organized labor and industrial pressure tactics, Franco-Americans joined unions in ever-rising numbers in the early twentieth century.

Nativism and interethnic tensions compounded the challenges of navigating the industrial economy. When called "the Chinese of the Eastern States" in a state report, French-Canadian migrants offered vociferous opposition; they refused to be racialized. They also endured the xenophobic language of certain press outlets and nativists (for instance, the American Protective Association established in 1887). In the 1920s, they would bear—and sometimes resist—the intimidation of the northern Ku Klux Klan, which aimed to secure white, Anglo-Saxon, Protestant supremacy.

To protect their identity and help preserve the fabric of traditional French-Canadian community, the migrants established their own Roman Catholic institutions, parish schools, fraternal and benevolent societies, and newspapers. They celebrated Saint-Jean-Baptiste Day—often with lavish parades—annually on or around June 24. Canadian businessmen and professionals provided leadership, as did parish priests. Efforts to preserve French-Canadian culture did not go undisputed. Clashes with the Irish community occurred when the migrants from Quebec sought to withdraw from existing parishes to form their own ethnic or "national" parishes, which would recognize their distinct culture. When those parishes were assigned an Irish pastor, the local population resisted. As per the ideology of survivance, commitment to the French language would help guard the French Canadians against apostasy, while the establishment of distinct parishes would buttress the traditional customs and sense of identity inherited from Quebec. Some bishops understood that distinct parishes would keep nascent Franco-American communities in the Catholic fold, but efforts to Americanize the Church during the Cahensly affair also pointed to a desire to speed the assimilation of Catholic immigrants.

French Canadians were visible in the significant labor they contributed to the industrial economy, their clashes with the Irish during strikes and Church controversies, their annual parades, and their presence as fictional characters on stage and screen. Such visibility—which sometimes fanned the flames of nativism—extended to politics. In addition to innumerable municipal officials and state legislators, Franco-Americans served as mayors of Woonsocket, Lewiston, Manchester, Fall River, Lowell, and many more communities. In the early twentieth century, Aram Pothier and Emery San Souci became governors of Rhode Island and Felix Hebert was elected to the U.S. Senate. In Massachusetts, Hugo Dubuque won an appointment to the Superior Court and Henri Achin was pro tempore speaker of the state House of Representatives. In Maine, Albert Beliveau, Harold Dubord, and Armand Dufresne served in elevated judicial capacities. In Vermont, J. D. Bachand served in the legislature and in state government; he promoted closer commercial and cultural relations between his state and Quebec.

Franco-Americans are known for their significant contributions to the arts (Lucien Gosselin); entertainment (Frank Fontaine, Robert Goulet, Eva Tanguay, Triple H, Rudy Vallée); industry (the Aubuchon family, Joseph Chalifoux, Yvon Chouinard, Joe Coulombe, the D'Amour family, Tom Plant); literature (Will Durant, Will James, Jack Kerouac, Grace Metalious, David Plante, Annie Proulx); law and political analysis (Robert Desty, E.J. Dionne); religion (Charles Chiniquy, Louis Edward Gelineau, Odore Gendron, George Albert Guertin, Ernest John Primeau); sports (Joan Benoit, Jack Delaney, Leo Durocher, Nap LaJoie); and technical innovation (John Garand, Louis Goddu, Cyprien Odilon Mailloux).

=== Newspapers ===
French-Canadian immigrants founded many French-Canadian newspapers, the first of which was the Burlington-based Patriote canadien, established in the 1830s. Most papers only lived a few years or less. Some, like L'Etoile (Lowell) and Le Messager (Lewiston) served their communities for decades starting in the late nineteenth century.
