= Casamajor =

Casamajor is a surname. Notable people with the surname include:

- A. A. Casamajor (1833–1861), British rower
- Paul Casamajor (1831–1887), Cuban-born American chemist
- Roger Casamajor (born 1976), Spanish actor
