= Edward Rollins =

Edward Rollins may refer to:

- Edward H. Rollins (1824–1889), American politician
- Ed Rollins (born 1943), Republican campaign consultant
- Edward Rollins (boxer) (1852–1939), Australian middleweight boxer
- Edward A. Rollins (1828–1885), Commissioner of Internal Revenue
