= Ahijah Wood House =

Historic house in Massachusetts, United States

- U.S. National Register of Historic Places
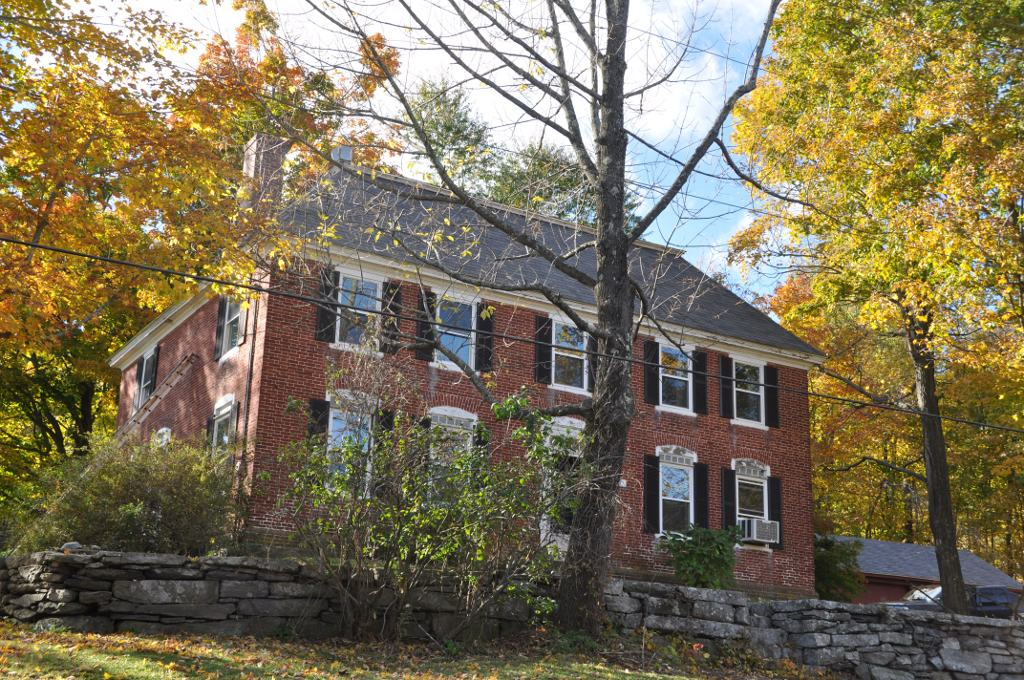

- Location within Massachusetts Location within the United States
- Location: 175 Worcester Rd., Westminster, Massachusetts
- Coordinates: 42°31′21″N 71°53′35″W
- Area: 7 acres (2.8 ha)
- Built: 1795
- Architectural style: Federal
- NRHP reference No.: 87000374
- Added to NRHP: September 17, 1987

The Ahijah Wood House is a historic house in Westminster, Massachusetts. The two-story brick Federal style house was built in 1795 by the son of an early settler and is a rare example of a Federal period house with a hipped mansard roof. The house was listed on the National Register of Historic Places in 1987 (where it is incorrectly listed at 174 Worcester Road).

== Description and history ==
The Ahijah Wood House is located in southern Westminster, on the west side of Worcester Road (Massachusetts Route 140) near its junction with Honey Bee Lane. It is a two-story brick building, with the brick laid mainly in Flemish bond. It is covered by a mansard roof, an extremely unusual feature for its 1795 construction date. The main facade is five bays wide, with first-floor windows set in segmented-arch openings with small-paned transom windows above. The interior follows a central hall plan, with a straight run main staircase in the hall. The flanking parlors retain original corner fireplaces, and many rooms have period wood paneling. The two rooms on the north side of the second story are separated by a distinctive folding wall.

Wood's father Nathan was the first colonial settler in what is today Westminster, arriving when Wood was a small child. Like his father, Wood was active in local politics, serving as town selectman. Ahijah Wood's son Aaron, who succeeded to the property, was a prominent local church member, temperance and anti-slavery activist, and politician. The property remained in the Wood family until 1902.

== See also ==
- Nathan Wood House, 164 Worcester Road (almost across the street), house of Ahijah's father
- National Register of Historic Places listings in Worcester County, Massachusetts
