= Ezra Wood–Levi Warner Place =

Historic house in Massachusetts, United States

- U.S. National Register of Historic Places
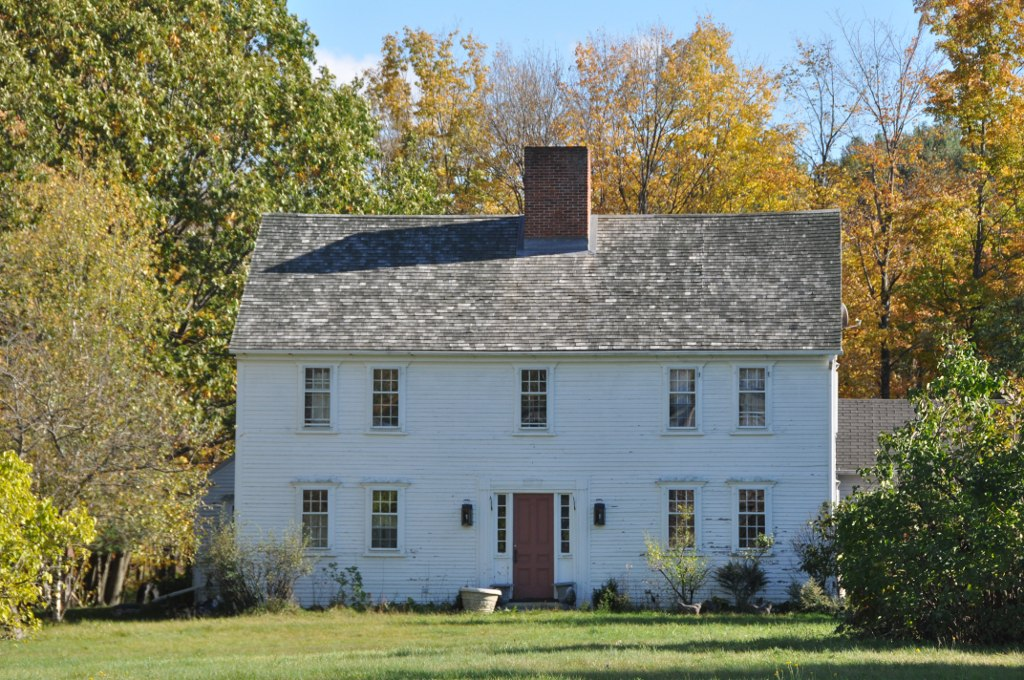

- Location within Massachusetts Location within the United States
- Location: 165 Depot Rd., Westminster, Massachusetts
- Coordinates: 42°33′28″N 71°52′23″W
- Area: 4.5 acres (1.8 ha)
- Built: 1759
- Architectural style: Greek Revival
- NRHP reference No.: 83000614
- Added to NRHP: July 7, 1983

The Ezra Wood–Levi Warner Place is an historic house at 165 Depot Road in Westminster, Massachusetts. The oldest portion of the house, now an ell attached to the rear of the main block, was built in 1759 by Nathaniel Merrill, and is one of the town's oldest surviving structures. The house has served as a hotel, stagecoach stop, post office, and as a stop on the Underground Railroad. The house was listed on the National Register of Historic Places in 1983.

== Description and history ==
The Ezra Wood–Levi Warner Place is located in central eastern Westminster, at the eastern corner of Depot Road with Massachusetts Route 2A. The main block of the house is a 2 1/2-story wood-frame structure, with a gabled roof, central chimney, and clapboarded exterior. Ells of varying ages extend on the side and rear. The main facade is five bays wide, with sash windows placed symmetrically around the main entrance. The entrance is flanked by sidelight windows, and has a simple trim surround. The interior retains significant original finishes, with a major restoration in the 1980s replacing some elements.

The oldest portion of the house, its rear ell, was built in 1759. In 1803 the property was acquired by Ezra Wood, who built the main house. Wood was a prominent local citizen, serving on the town school committee and board of selectmen. He was also an early abolitionist, and it is believed the property housed fugitive slaves on the Underground Railroad. It was operated by the Woods as a hotel and stagecoach stop until 1844, and by Isaac Hall afterwards, until it was closed because the railroad rendered the stagecoach system obsolete. The property was purchased by Rev. Levi Warner before 1870, and remained in his family well into the 20th century. Warner's son Olin, who achieved note as a sculptor, eventually inherited the property, passing it on to his niece upon his death. The house was moved and reoriented on its lot in the 1980s due to road realignments, preserving the original 1759 ell and main block.

== See also ==
- National Register of Historic Places listings in Worcester County, Massachusetts
