= Mabel MacFerran Rockwell =

American electrical engineer (1902–1979)

- Photo from Electrical Engineering (1935)
- Born: Mabel MacFerran; 1902; Philadelphia, Pennsylvania, US
- Died: May 27, 1979 (age 77); Mountain View, California, US
- Education: Bryn Mawr College
- Alma mater: Massachusetts Institute of Technology (1925 BS Mathematics), Stanford University (1926 MS Electrical Engineering)
- Occupation: Electrical engineering
- Spouse: Edward W. Rockwell (m. 1935; div. 1958)
- Children: 1
- Engineering career
- Employers: Southern California Edison, Metropolitan Water District of Southern California, Lockheed Corporation, United States Bureau of Reclamation, Westinghouse
- Awards: Society of Women Engineers Achievement Award

Mabel MacFerran Rockwell (1902 – May 27, 1979) was an American electrical engineer and one of the first three female fellows of the American Institute of Electrical Engineers (AIEE). MacFerran worked for Southern California Edison, the Metropolitan Water District of Southern California in Los Angeles, the United States Bureau of Reclamation, and the Lockheed Corporation. She contributed significantly to high-voltage power generation and distribution, aeronautical manufacturing research and development, and electrical system integration within facilities. In her later career, she worked on control systems for naval vehicles, including the submarine-launched Polaris missile.

== Early life and education ==
Mabel MacFerran was born in Philadelphia, Pennsylvania, in 1902 to Edgar O. and Mabel Alexander MacFerran. Her father was an electrical engineer and her mother an astronomer and mathematician. She was raised in the Quaker tradition.

She attended the Germantown Friends School in Germantown, Pennsylvania. While studying at Bryn Mawr College, she had a summer job with the Leeds and Northrup Company, which introduced her to engineering. In 1925, she graduated with a B.S. in science, teaching, and mathematics (Sigma Xi) first in her class at the Massachusetts Institute of Technology.

She received the Elwell Fellowship to attend Stanford University. There she worked with Professor Harris J. Ryan in the million volt laboratory. She obtained an M.S. degree in electrical engineering from Stanford in 1926.

== Career ==
In 1926, MacFerran joined the Southern California Edison Company Limited as an apprentice testman, becoming the technical assistant to the operating engineer in 1928. She specialized in studies of high voltage power transmission and system stability. She made one of the earliest applications of the method of symmetrical components to power systems.

Along with Roy B. Ashbrook, Roy Edwin Quanstrom, and Benjamin F. Dengler, MacFerran received U.S. patent 1,889,086 (filed December 30, 1929, granted November 29, 1932) for a "Protective Gap for Electrical Equipment" which became known as the "Serjdetour" telephone protector.

In 1932, she became an assistant electrical engineer at the Metropolitan Water District of Southern California at Los Angeles. She worked on electrical problems with the Colorado River Aqueduct, including economic and engineering studies for the construction power system and the main transmission system. MacFerran was the only woman to work on the design and installation of the electrical systems, specifically the power generating equipment, for Boulder Dam (later renamed Hoover Dam). She worked on the economic design of the company's transmission for the dam, which was the basis for her prize-winning paper "Power Limits of 220 Kv Transmission Lines" (co-authored with A. A. Kroneberg). She also designed the transmission and distribution systems for the San Joaquin Valley District in California.

In 1938, she became the Plant Electrical Engineer for the Lockheed Aircraft Corporation (Lockheed Corporation) and in 1940 became Production Research Engineer. She led a research team that improved spot welding for aircraft production. She then turned her team's focus to the problems of forming sheet metal airplane parts, publishing a series of articles on this research.

From 1946 to 1951, she worked at the US Naval Ordnance Test Station as a General Engineer where she eventually worked on electrical features of various classified underwater propulsion and guidance systems. From 1951 to 1953, she was an electrical engineer with the United States Bureau of Reclamation in Sacramento, California and Fresno, California. She was chief of the power section in the San Joaquin Valley district office in Fresno. She undertook various special assignments and consulting work from 1954 until early 1958.

In 1958, she went to work for Westinghouse where she designed the electrical control system for the UGM-27 Polaris missile launcher. Despite her work in the field, by 1949 she was advocating for a turn from weapons development to working for peace. In an interview with the LA Times, she said: "We know enough about the atom—now it's time for intelligent men everywhere to develop spiritual values. Americans must halt their pursuit of more technical knowledge and devote their time to the elimination of war by turning from things of the mind to things of the spirit."

== Awards, honors and memberships ==
MacFerran became an associate member of the American Institute of Electrical Engineers (AIEE) in 1928, one of the first ten women to join the professional association. She became an AIEE member in 1935. In 1948, she became one of the first three female Fellows of AIEE.

In 1929 she won the Initial Paper Prize in the AIEE 8th District for her paper "Parallel Operation of Transformers Whose Ratios of Transformation are Unequal."

In 1934 she won the AIEE Pacific District prize for "Power Limits of 220 Kv Transmission Lines" with co-author A. A. Kroneberg.

In 1958 President Eisenhower named her Woman Engineer of the Year.

In 1959, she won the SWE Achievement Award from the Society of Women Engineers "in recognition of her significant contributions to the field of electrical control systems."

== Publications ==
- "Parallel Operation of Transformers Whose Ratios of Transformation are Unequal", 1930
- "Power Limits of 220-Kv Transmission Lines" (with Alex A. Kroneberg), 1934
- "Empirical Method of Calculating Corona Loss From High-Voltage Transmission Lines" (with Joseph S. Carroll), 1937
- "Empirical Method of Calculating Corona Loss From High-Voltage Transmission Lines" (published discussion with E. C. Starr and author), 1938
- "The Development of Aircraft Spotwelding", 1941
- "Mechanics of Deep Drawing Sheet Metal Parts" (with Given Brewer), 1942
- "Stretch-Forming Contoured Sheet Metal Aircraft Parts" (with T. H. Hazlett), 1942
- "Measurements of Drawing Properties of Aluminum Sheet" (with Given A. Brewer), 1942
- "Stress-Strain Relationships in Drawing of Materials" (with G. A. Brewer), 1942
- "Some Factors Affecting the Drawability of Aluminum Sheets" (with G. A. Brewer and V. N. Krivobok), 1942
- "The Effect of Weld Spacing on the Strength of Spot-Welded Joints" (with R. Della-Vedowa), 1942
- "Electrical Power in Aircraft", 1944

== Legacy ==
Mabel MacFerran Rockwell was the first and only woman to design, develop, and oversee the installation of the power generating equipment for the Hoover Dam and the associated transmission equipment to move the power from the Dam to points of use.

She was one of the first three women fellows of the AIEE, along with Edith Clarke and Vivien Kellems.

== Personal life ==
MacFerran married fellow engineer Edward W. Rockwell on June 7, 1935. Because they were both members of the AIEE, the society's journal Electrical Engineering deemed the event newsworthy and published an account in the July 1935 issue. The Rockwells became the fourth couple where both partners were members of the society. At the time, there were only nine female members of the AIEE.

The Rockwells had one daughter, Margaret Alice, in 1936. MacFerran and Rockwell divorced in 1958.

MacFerran enjoyed tennis, hiking, sailing, as well as racing cars. She would also relax with a murder mystery.

She died in Mountain View, California, on May 27, 1979, at the age of 77. A memorial service was held at Stanford Memorial Church.

== Additional reading ==
Johnson, Vicki (2025). Chapter 10 "Mabel MacFerran Rockwell". In Craig, Cecilia; Teig, Holly; Kimberling, Debra; Williams, Janet; Tietjen, Jill; Johnson, Vicki (eds.). Women Engineering Legends 1952-1976: Society of Women Engineers Achievement Award Recipients. Springer Cham. ISBN 9783032002235
