= Nathan Wood House =

Historic house in Massachusetts, United States

- U.S. National Register of Historic Places
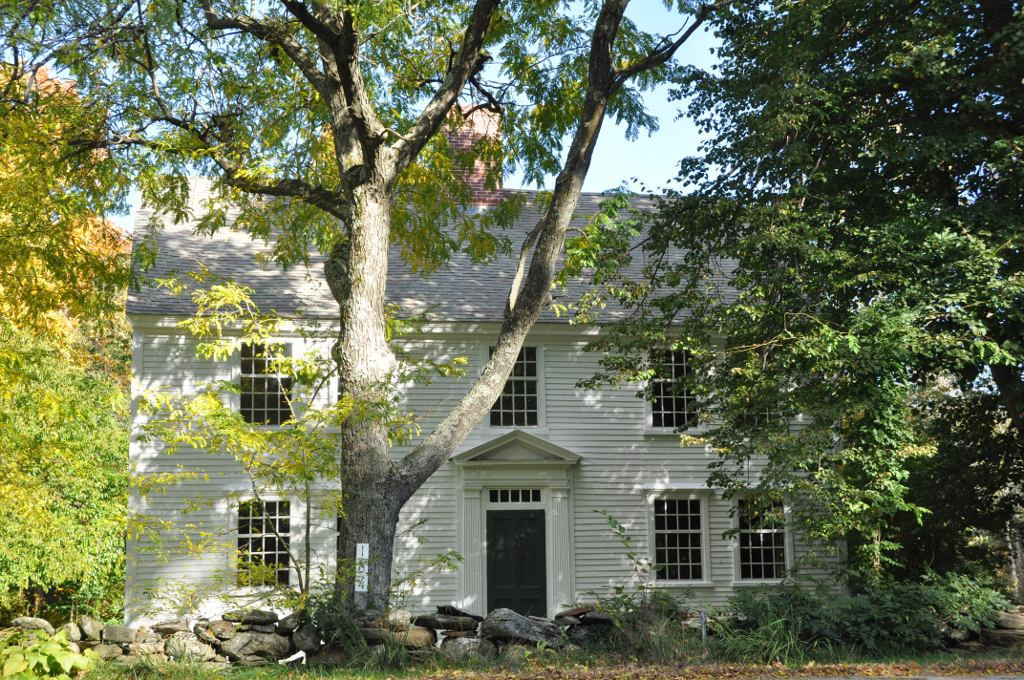

- Location within Massachusetts Location within the United States
- Location: 164 Worcester Road, Westminster, Massachusetts
- Coordinates: 42°31′27″N 71°53′30″W
- Area: 4 acres (1.6 ha)
- Built: 1756
- Built by: Nathan Wood
- Architectural style: Georgian
- NRHP reference No.: 87000375
- Added to NRHP: September 16, 1987

The Nathan Wood House is a historic house located in Westminster, Massachusetts. Built in 1756 by one of the town's early settlers, it is one of its oldest surviving buildings, and good example of colonial Georgian residential architecture. It was listed on the National Register of Historic Places on September 16, 1987.

== Description and history ==
The Nathan Wood House is located in southern Westminster, on the east side of Worcester Road (Massachusetts Route 140), just south of its junction with Patricia Lane. It is a 2 1/2-story wood-frame structure, with a gabled roof, central chimney, and clapboarded exterior. The main facade is five bays wide, with sash windows arranged symmetrically around the main entrance. The entrance is flanked by pilasters and topped by a five-light transom window and pedimented gable. The interior follows a typical Georgian center chimney plan, with parlors on either side of a narrow vestibule with winding staircase. The interior retains significant original finish, including horsehair plaster, carved wooden wainscoting, and paneled fireplace surrounds. Second-floor windows are butted against the eave in Georgian fashion, and there are simple corner boards.

The house was built in 1756 by Nathan Wood, a native of Concord, who arrived here not long after the Worcester Road was laid out. Wood and his descendants were active in town affairs, serving in the local militia and as selectmen. The house remained in the Wood family into the late 19th century.

== See also ==
- Ahijah Wood House, 175 Worcester Road, built by Nathan's son
- National Register of Historic Places listings in Worcester County, Massachusetts
