= William Orton (businessman) =

American businessman

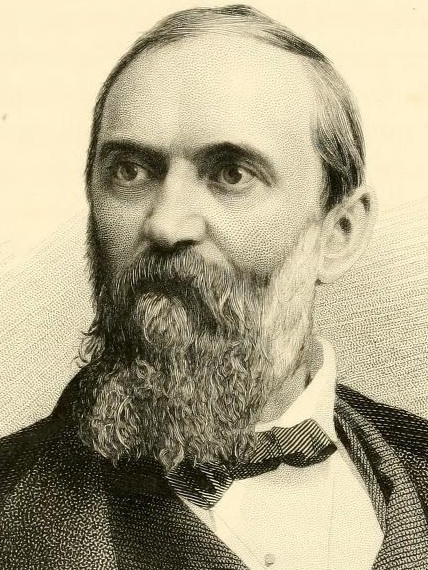

3rd Commissioner of Internal Revenue
- In office March 11, 1869 – October 31, 1865
- President: Andrew Johnson
- Preceded by: Joseph J. Lewis
- Succeeded by: Edward A. Rollins

Personal details
- Born: June 14, 1826 Cuba, New York
- Died: April 22, 1878 (aged 51) New York City, New York
- Resting place: Sleepy Hollow Cemetery, Sleepy Hollow, New York
- Party: Republican
- Spouse: Agnes J. Gillespie (m. 1852-1878, his death)
- Children: 8
- Education: New York State Normal School
- Occupation: Business executive (1847–1878)
- Known for: President, Western Union Telegraph Company, 1867–1878

William Orton (June 14, 1826 – April 22, 1878) was an American businessman who served as president of the Western Union Telegraph Company.

== Early life ==
William Orton was born in Cuba, New York on June 14, 1826. He was trained as a printer and worked on a newspaper in the village of Cuba. He graduated from the State Normal School (now the State University of New York at Albany) in 1847, and received his certification as a teacher.

He taught at a school in Cuba, and then moved to Geneva to become a clerk in a bookstore. In 1852 Orton moved to Buffalo, where he became a partner in a publishing company called Derby, Orton & Co.

== Start of career ==
In 1858 Orton moved to New York City to become a partner in another publishing company, Miller & Orton. This firm went out of business two years later, with Orton moving to the bookselling and publishing firm of J. G. Gregory & Co. as managing clerk.

A Republican and supporter of the Union during the American Civil War, Orton was elected to New York City's Common Council in 1860, and served one term.

From 1862 to 1865 he was federal Collector of Revenue for the 6th district of New York. In 1865 Orton was appointed Commissioner of Internal Revenue, but he served at this post in Washington, D.C. for only four months before resigning to resume his business career.

== Continued career ==
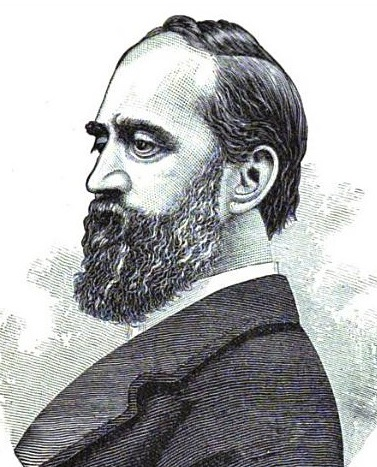
William Orton in 1882's "The Royal Road to Wealth: How to Find and Follow It".

Orton was appointed president of the United States Telegraph Company in the fall of 1865. When this company merged with Western Union in 1866 Orton was appointed Western Union's vice president. He also studied law, and attained admission to the bar in 1867. In 1867 Jeptha Wade resigned as president of Western Union, and Orton succeeded him. In addition to his position at Western Union, Orton was president of the Gold and Stock Telegraph Company, International Ocean Telegraph Company, and Atlantic and Southern Telegraph Company.

In 1871 President Ulysses S. Grant offered the position of Collector of the Port of New York to John Augustus Griswold, who declined. Grant then offered to nominate Orton, who also declined. Griswold and Orton both recommended Chester A. Arthur, who received the appointment.

Orton was a delegate to the 1872 and 1876 Republican National Conventions.

He was active in the Episcopal Church, and served as a vestryman at New York City's Church of the Holy Apostles.

== Death ==
Orton died at his home in New York City on April 22, 1878. He was buried at Sleepy Hollow Cemetery in Sleepy Hollow, New York. He was succeeded by Norvin Green as the head of Western Union.

== Family ==
In 1852 Orton married Agnes J. Gillespie of Buffalo. They were the parents of eight children: Jessie; Alice; William, Jr.; James; Agnes; M. Virginia; Robert; and Grosvenor.

Business positions
| Preceded by Jeptha Wade | President of the Western Union Telegraph Company; 1867–1878 | Succeeded by Norvin Green |
