= Westminster Village–Academy Hill Historic District =

Historic district in Massachusetts, United States

- U.S. National Register of Historic Places
- U.S. Historic district
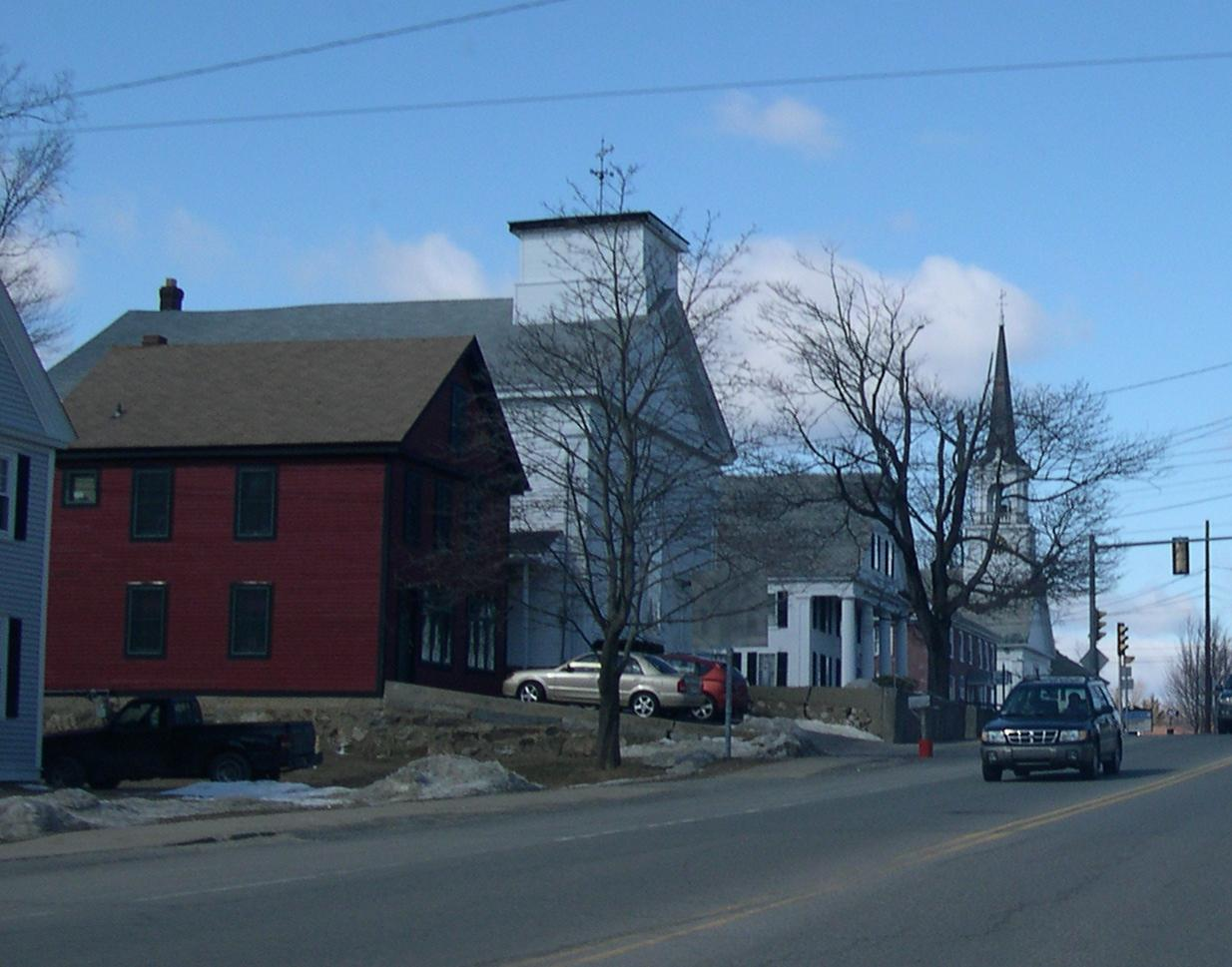

- Location within Massachusetts Location within the United States
- Location: Westminster, Massachusetts
- Coordinates: 42°32′37″N 71°54′41″W
- Area: 92 acres (37 ha)
- Built: 1734
- Architect: Multiple
- Architectural style: Greek Revival, Late Victorian
- NRHP reference No.: 83000612
- Added to NRHP: June 23, 1983

Westminster Village–Academy Hill Historic District encompasses the historic first town center of Westminster, Massachusetts, as well as its later early-19th century commercial core. Centered at the junction Main and South Streets with Academy Hill Road, it contains fine examples of Colonial, Federal, and Greek Revival architecture, including the 1839 town hall. The district was listed on the National Register of Historic Places in 1983.

== Description and history ==
The town of Westminster was settled in 1737 and incorporated in 1759. Its early town center was located on a high point near the town's geographic center, now known as Academy Hill. That area included the town common, and was historically lined by houses and early civic buildings, including a church and a school house. None of the civic buildings have survived, leaving a collection of colonial and Federal period houses, to which the Colonial Revival Upton School was added in 1912. The town center migrated westward in the first half of the 19th century, when a turnpike (now Main Street) was opened, drawing first economic activity and then civic and religious buildings, while Academy Hill remained a desirable location for the town's upper class. The village reached its peak population around 1855, having grown as both a small industrial center and as a stage stop serving travelers. The town declined in economic importance after it was bypassed by the railroad.

The historic district is roughly centered on the junction of Main and South Streets, extending west along Main Street roughly to Adams Street, and eastward along Academy Hill Road to its triangular junction with Dawley Street. The older Academy Hill area is near the eastern end of the district, while the later town center is along Main Street. Most of the Main Street buildings are Greek Revival in character, although there are examples of later Victorian and early 20th-century Colonial Revival styles. The Forbush Library, built in 1901, and the town hall (1829) are the major civic buildings in the center.

== See also ==
- National Register of Historic Places listings in Worcester County, Massachusetts
