= Gamaliel Waldo Beaman =

American painter (1852–1937)

- Born: September 4, 1852; Westminster, Massachusetts, US
- Died: May 7, 1937 (aged 84); Westminster, Massachusetts
- Education: Lowell Institute
- Known for: Landscape painting

Gamaliel Waldo Beaman (September 4, 1852 – May 7, 1937) was an American landscape painter active in New England. He is best known for his views of New Hampshire's White Mountains as well as his many paintings of the Connecticut Valley and of Mount Wachusett and Mount Monadnock in north central Massachusetts and southern New Hampshire.

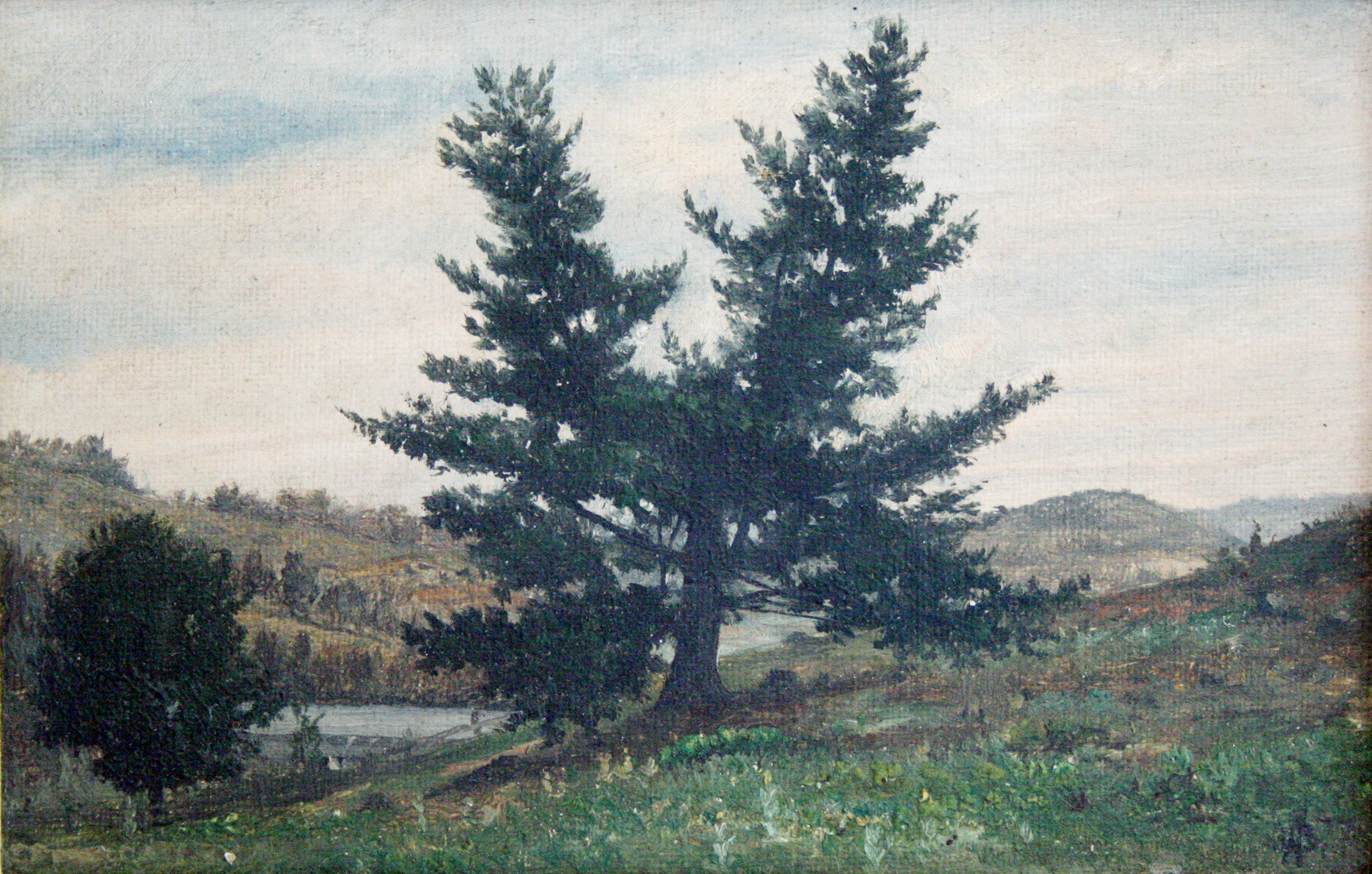
A bifurcated tree, probably in the Berkshires or north central Massachusetts.

== Life and career ==
Beaman was born into a poor farming family in Westminster, Massachusetts. As a young man he moved to Cambridge, Massachusetts, where he became a landscape painter. He worked in oils and watercolors and took drawing classes at the Lowell Institute. In his early twenties he traveled and painted in the White Mountains and in the Rocky Mountains of Colorado. In 1878 and 1879 he studied in Paris and Pont-Aven, France, earning his passage by escorting the daughter of a rich cousin and her mother (he returned home on a cattle boat).

Upon his return, Beaman established a studio on Tremont Street in Boston. During this period, he frequently traveled to Northfield, Massachusetts, where he painted in and around the Connecticut Valley. There he received commissions from evangelist Dwight Lyman Moody. It was there that he also met and married Mary Priest Stearns on October 22, 1885. Mary died of consumption shortly after the birth of their second child, and in 1894 Beaman married his second wife, Eileen Marie Rand Sherman of North Adams, Massachusetts. Following their marriage, the artist and his wife maintained a residence and studio in Manchester-by-the-Sea, Massachusetts. In 1898, the Beamans returned to north central Massachusetts and bought a home in Princeton. In his later years, his sight began to fail and he supplemented his income by operating an early Americana shop, earning him the nickname "Antique Beaman." Neighbors characterized him as increasingly irascible in his old age. He died at the age of 84 and was interred in the Whitmansville cemetery in Westminster.

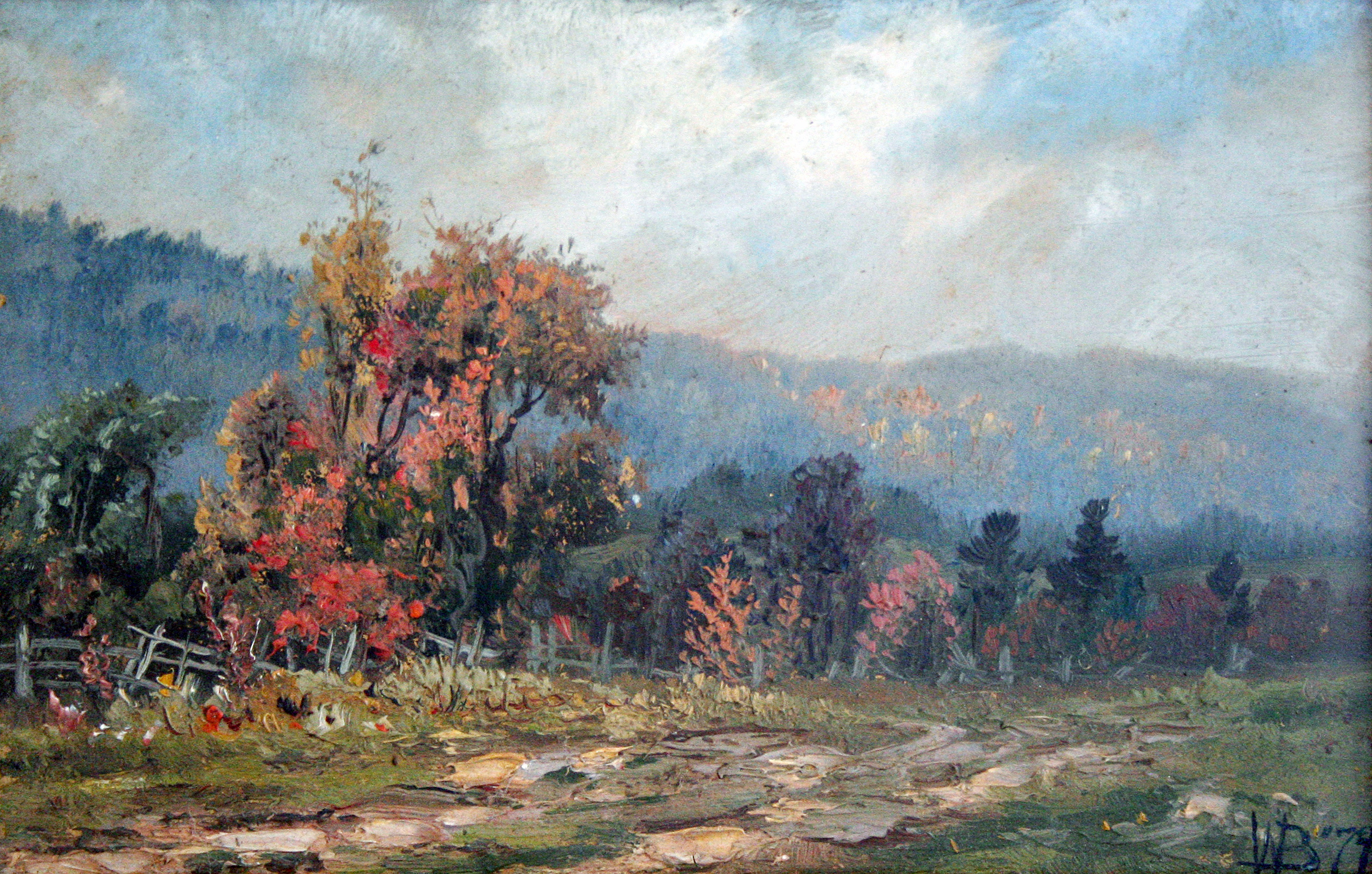
Autumn landscape, probably north central Massachusetts.

== Artistic work ==
Beaman exhibited at the Boston Art Club from 1877 to 1882, at the Museum of Fine Arts, Boston in 1883, and at the Pennsylvania Academy of the Fine Arts in 1881, 1884, and 1885. He exhibited widely in many industrial exhibits, including those sponsored by the New England Manufacturers' and Mechanics' Institute and the Massachusetts Charitable Mechanic Association. One of his paintings was included in the World Cotton Centennial Exposition in 1884. His work is listed in the archives of the Smithsonian Museum of American Art.

At least one of Beaman's paintings is held in the collection of the Hood Museum of Art at Dartmouth College in Hanover, New Hampshire. Many of his paintings may be viewed in the collections of Northfield, Princeton, and Westminster public libraries and historical societies in Massachusetts. The vast majority of his work, estimated to be between three and four hundred paintings, reside in private collections throughout the United States.
