= Cyprien O. Mailloux =

Canada-born American electrical engineer and inventor (1857–1932)

Cyprien Odilon Mailloux
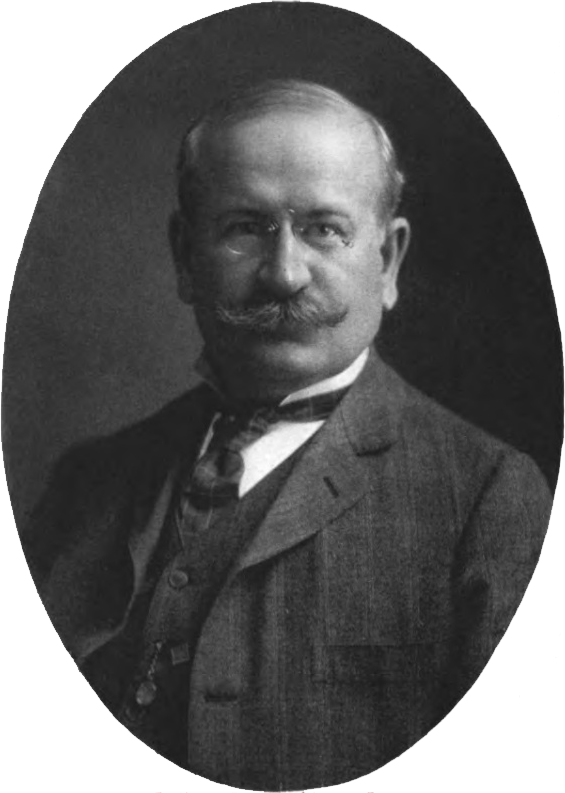
- Born: 30 July 1857; L'Acadie, Quebec, Canada
- Died: 4 October 1932 (aged 75); New York City, U.S.
- Citizenship: Canadian (1857–1921); American (1921–1932)
- Known for: work on International Electrotechnical Commission

Signature
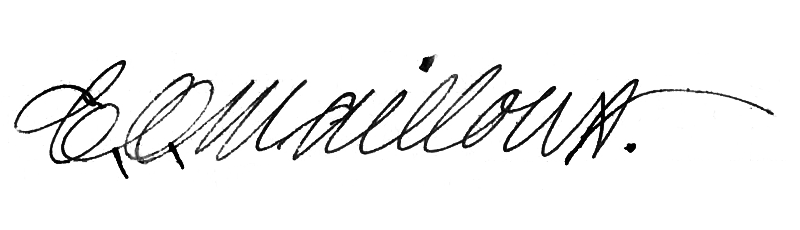

Cyprien O. Mailloux (July 30, 1857 – October 4, 1932) American electrical engineer and inventor. He served terms of office as president of the International Electrotechnical Commission and as president of the American Institute of Electrical Engineers between 1913 and 1914. He was also an editor of the ‘’Electrical World’’ journal, and supported the standardization of technical terms.

== Early life and education ==
Cyprien Odilon Mailloux was born in L'Acadie, Quebec in 1857. His mother Helene "Ellen" Guernon and father Jean-Baptiste "John" Mailloux were of French descent who migrated to the US during the Quebec diaspora. At a young age, his family relocated to Lowell, Massachusetts, Boston then New York City.

In 1905, he obtained his bachelor's degree from Brooklyn Polytechnic Institute before receiving MSc in electrical engineering. In pursuit of professional learning, he was one of the leading pupils of Dr. M. I. Pupin, who was a lecturer on advanced theory of electrical engineering at Columbia University.

== Career ==
After graduation, Mailloux established himself as a professional electrical engineer and inventor. In December 1891, Mailloux filed an application to patent a system of power distribution. It was granted on August 31, 1893, as Canadian patent number 44129. This system used both alternating current (ac) and direct current (dc) for reasons that are related to what has become known as "the battle of the currents" that was taking place at that time.

During his early career, Mailloux designed very complex dc power systems for large buildings, many of them in New York City where he maintained his office. These included the original Astoria Hotel (on the site now occupied by the Empire State Building), the Park Row Building in downtown Manhattan, Aeolian Hall, formerly on 42nd Street, and the New York Life Insurance Building.

Mailloux developed the "booster" to be used in these kinds of systems. This refers to an assembly made up of a DC motor running off the power system itself and a low voltage DC generator. To provide the required increase in charging voltage throughout the charging cycle, the booster generator could be connected in series with the batteries. The battery discharge circuitry might then utilize the same booster in reverse to slightly reduce the voltage in order to prolong the life of the bulb. The booster can also be connected to both the motor (power) system and the lighting system in order to maintain two separate voltages at the same time. Moreover, it could be applied to "boost" the voltage on feeders on upper levels of a building.

By the late 1880s, Mailloux had become a respected and well-known consulting electrical engineer. He teamed up with Benjamin Tingley Rogers and patent lawyer Paul Wilcox to establish the Casamajor Filter Co., posthumously named after chemist Paul Casamajor for sugar filtration.

=== Patents ===
Mailloux made at least 100 original inventions, more than 30 of which had been patented.

Patents released in America
Number of patent	Date
U.S. patent 430,868 Regulation System for Electric Circuits	24 June 1890
U.S. patent 467,543 Apparatus for Charging secondary batteries	26 January 1892
U.S. patent 467,544 Apparatus for Charging secondary batteries	26 January 1892
U.S. patent 467,545 Charging secondary batteries	26 January 1892
U.S. patent 467,546 Apparatus for Charging secondary batteries	26 January 1892
U.S. patent 467,547 Apparatus for Charging secondary batteries	26 January 1892
U.S. patent 543,495 Electrical controlling system for elevators	30 July 1895
U.S. patent 575,523 Push button	19 January 1897
U.S. patent 614,228 Method of charging secondary batteries	15 November 1898
U.S. patent 668,108 Transfer apparatus for electric batteries	12 February 1901
U.S. patent 668,109 Storage and transfer system for electric batteries	12 February 1901
U.S. patent 714,497 Railway electric-motor-cooling system	25 November 1902
U.S. patent 714,498 Railway electric-motor-cooling system	25 November 1902
U.S. patent 719,020 Railway electric-motor-cooling system	27 January 1903
U.S. patent 725,001 Indicating and controlling apparatus	7 April 1903
U.S. patent 724,722 Electrical controlling system for elevators	7 April 1903
U.S. patent 935,763 Draft-regulating apparatus	5 October 1909
U.S. patent 942,861 Gas-analyzer for furnaces	7 December 1909
U.S. patent 1,014,241 Indicating gas-analyzer	9 January 1912
U.S. patent 1,043,616 Automatic draft-modifier	5 November 1912

=== Writings ===
Besides his patents, Mailloux did expert work, and submitted testimony, reports, and arbitrations in over 1,000 cases. He became the editor of trade journal Electrical World and remained a frequent contributor to technical literature.

He presented papers at the annual convention of the American Institute of Electrical Engineers. He also translated several books from various languages that contributed to the establishment of the Engineering Societies Library in New York City.

- The induction motor; its theory and design, set forth by a practical method of calculation, McGraw, 1903
- The induction motor; its theory and design, set forth by a practical method of calculation, McGraw, 1906
- Methode de determination du courant constant produisant le meme échauffement qu'un courant variable, Tipografia Baravalle e Falconieri, 1911
- Graphical determination of sags and stresses for overhead line construction, McGraw-Hill Book Co., Inc., 1915
- Standard specifications and tests for Portland cement, Government printing office, 1921

As well, he worked on French translation of documents from the American Society for Testing and Materials.

- Cahier des charges normalisé pour essieux en acier laminé à froid, Imprimerie du gouvernement, 1921
- Cahier des charges normalisé pour fil de cuivre demi-écroui, Washington, Imprimerie du gouvernement, 1921
- Cahier des charges normalisé pour tubes en fer forgé soudés, Imprimerie du gouvernement, 1921
- Cahier des charges normalisé pour tuyaux et pièces moulées spéciales en fonte, Imprimerie du gouvernement, 1921

=== Organizations ===
In 1884, Mailloux became a charter member of the American Institute of Electrical Engineers. He served as an officer of AIEE at different capacities and remained active throughout his life. He served 3 terms as manager (1886–1889, 1899–1902, 1905–1907); 2 terms as vice-president (1898–1899, 1902–1904); and devoted many years to the institute's committees including the standards committee, the Edison Medal committee, and the John Fritz Medal board of award. In 1912, he was elected as an AIEE Fellow.

In 1913, he was elected President of AIEE owing to his active role in the International Electrotechnical Commission (IEC). He advocated for all electrical technologists in the AIEE because "in union there is strength" and were in support of admitting women to membership in their organization.

Dr. Mailloux also served as IEC president (1919–1923), director, and secretariat on nomenclature; and on the U.S. national committee of the I.E.C, president (1914–1924) chairman, advisor on nomenclature, representative on division of foreign relations. In the 1921 International Conference on Large Electric High-Tension Systems in Paris, he was honorary president, acting also as United States delegate at biennial meetings.

== Marriage and family ==
On June 21, 1883, Cyprien Mailloux was married to Emma Bertha Debs in Terre Haute, Indiana where they met. Known as Emily, she was the sister of Eugene Debs, one of the most significant American socialists of the 20th century.

== Death and honors ==
Cyprien Odilon Mailloux died in New York City and was interred in Terre Haute, Indiana.

Doctor Mailloux was made a chevalier of the Legion of Honour (France) in 1913 and promoted to the grade of officier in 1921. In 1914, he also received an honorary degree of D.Sc., from Lehigh University.

== See also ==
- Alexander Graham Bell
- Mihajlo Pupin
- History of the Franco-Americans
