= Westminster, Massachusetts =

- Town
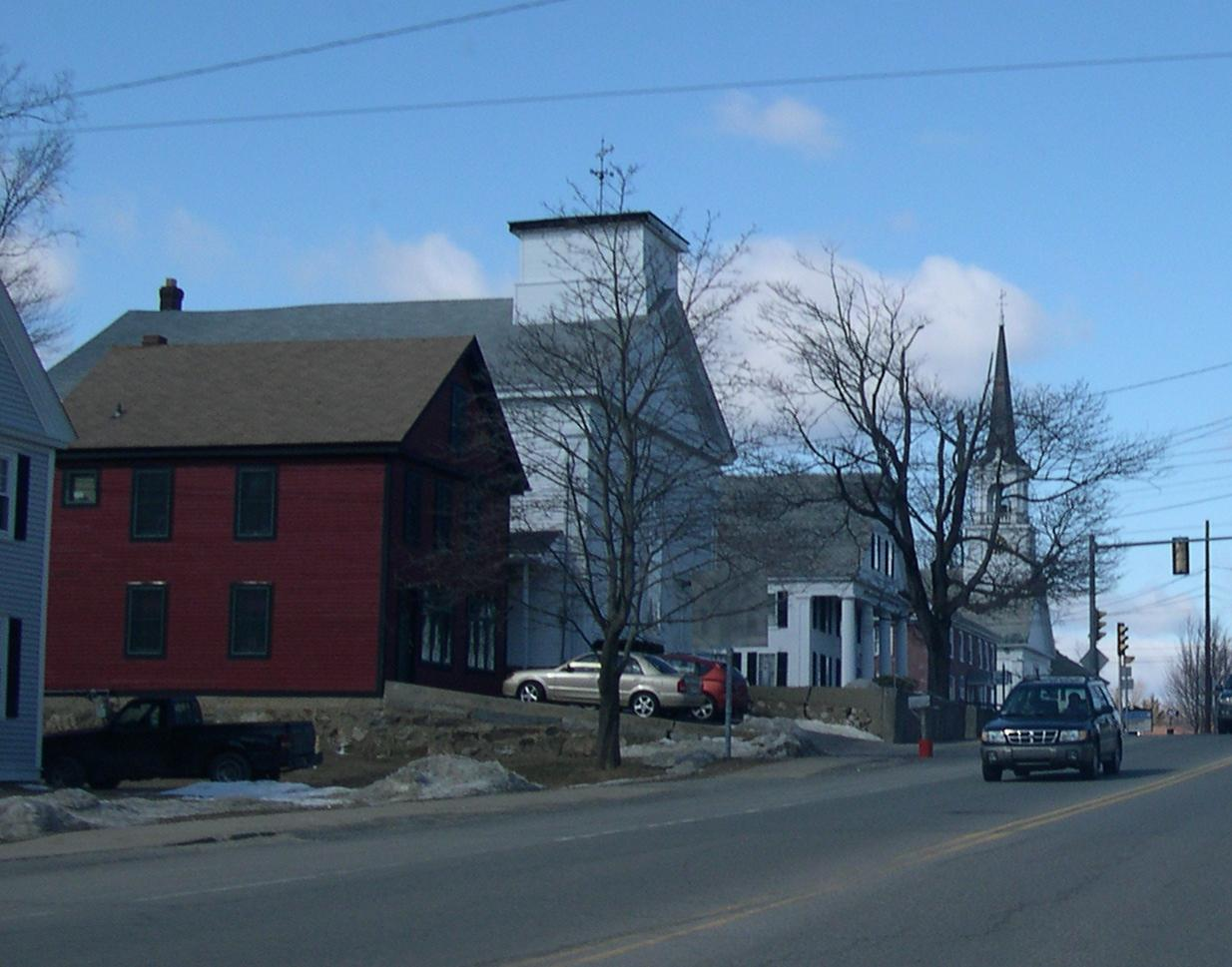
- Westminster Historic District

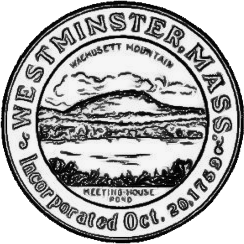
- Seal

- Location in Worcester County and the Commonwealth of Massachusetts.
- Coordinates: 42°32′45″N 71°54′40″W
- Country: United States
- State: Massachusetts
- County: Worcester
- Settled: 1737
- District: October 20, 1759
- Town: April 26, 1770

Government
  - Type: Open town meeting

Area
  - Total: 37.3 sq mi (96.7 km^{2})
  - Land: 35.5 sq mi (92.0 km^{2})
  - Water: 1.8 sq mi (4.7 km^{2})
- Elevation: 1,079 ft (329 m)

Population (2020)
  - Total: 8,213
  - Density: 231/sq mi (89.3/km^{2})
- Time zone: UTC−5 (Eastern)
  - Summer (DST): UTC−4 (Eastern)
- ZIP Code: 01473
- Area code: 351/978
- FIPS code: 25-77010
- GNIS feature ID: 0618393
- Website: Official website

Westminster is a town in Worcester County, Massachusetts, United States. At the 2020 census, the town population was 8,213.

== History ==
Westminster was first settled by Europeans in 1737, and was officially incorporated in 1759.

Westminster has four entries in the National Register of Historic Places: Ahijah Wood House, Nathan Wood House, Ezra Wood-Levi Warner Place, and Westminster Village-Academy Hill Historic District.

Westminster was the site of Westminster Academy, incorporated in 1833.

On August 25, 1909, a large parade was held in honor of the 150th anniversary of the town's establishment. A civic parade begun at 10 o'clock which featured an array of floats and music provided by the Fitchburg Military and Gardner bands. That year, Wilbur F. Whitney published the 150th Anniversary Celebration of the Town of Westminster, Massachusetts, containing "Historical & Legendary Reminiscences Connected with the Town" which detailed the event and local floats.

The town achieved national news in November 2014 when the Board of Health proposed banning all sales of tobacco.

== Geography ==
According to the United States Census Bureau, the town has a total area of 37.3 square miles (97 km^{2}), of which 35.5 square miles (92 km^{2}) is land and 1.8 square miles (4.7 km^{2}), or 4.90%, is water.

Westminster is bordered by Ashburnham to the north, Gardner to the west, Hubbardston to the southwest, Princeton to the south, and Leominster and Fitchburg to the east.

== Demographics ==
Historical population
| Year | Pop. | ±% |
|---|---|---|
| 1790 | 1,176 | — |
| 1850 | 1,914 | +62.8% |
| 1860 | 1,840 | −3.9% |
| 1870 | 1,770 | −3.8% |
| 1880 | 1,652 | −6.7% |
| 1890 | 1,688 | +2.2% |
| 1900 | 1,327 | −21.4% |
| 1910 | 1,353 | +2.0% |
| 1920 | 1,343 | −0.7% |
| 1930 | 1,925 | +43.3% |
| 1940 | 2,126 | +10.4% |
| 1950 | 2,768 | +30.2% |
| 1960 | 4,022 | +45.3% |
| 1970 | 4,273 | +6.2% |
| 1980 | 5,139 | +20.3% |
| 1990 | 6,191 | +20.5% |
| 2000 | 6,907 | +11.6% |
| 2010 | 7,277 | +5.4% |
| 2020 | 8,213 | +12.9% |
| 2023* | 8,377 | +2.0% |
* = population estimate. Source: United States census records and Population Estimates Program data.

As of the census of 2000, there were 6,907 people, 2,529 households, and 1,954 families residing in the town. The population density was 194.5 inhabitants per square mile (75.1/km^{2}). There were 2,694 housing units at an average density of 75.9 per square mile (29.3/km^{2}). The racial makeup of the town was 97.50% White, 0.46% African American, 0.14% Native American, 1.14% Asian, 0.14% from other races, and 0.61% from two or more races. Hispanic or Latino of any race were 1.11% of the population. 17.6% were of French, 15.0% Irish, 13.2% French Canadian, 9.0% English, 9.0% Italian, 8.5% Finnish and 5.6% American ancestry according to Census 2000.

There were 2,529 households, out of which 36.9% had children under the age of 18 living with them, 65.8% were married couples living together, 8.1% had a female householder with no husband present, and 22.7% were non-families. 17.7% of all households were made up of individuals, and 6.6% had someone living alone who was 65 years of age or older. The average household size was 2.73 and the average family size was 3.09.

In the town, the population was spread out, with 26.8% under the age of 18, 6.1% from 18 to 24, 28.9% from 25 to 44, 27.3% from 45 to 64, and 10.9% who were 65 years of age or older. The median age was 39 years. For every 100 females, there were 99.5 males. For every 100 females age 18 and over, there were 95.4 males.

The median income for a household in the town was $57,755, and the median income for a family was $61,835. Males had a median income of $45,369 versus $31,818 for females. The per capita income for the town was $24,913. About 3.0% of families and 3.1% of the population were below the poverty line, including 1.5% of those under age 18 and 5.1% of those age 65 or over.

== Economy ==
From 1828 to 1970, Westminster was home to the Westminster Cracker Company. Westminster is currently home to:

- the U.S. Corporate Sales & Marketing division of SimplexGrinnell
- the Distribution Center of Aubuchon Hardware
- the Wachusett Brewing Company

== Arts and culture ==
The Forbush Memorial Library was established in 1868. In fiscal year 2022, the town of Westminster spent 1.88% ($459,679) of its budget on its public library.

== Government ==
=== State ===
- State Representatives: Kimberly Ferguson (R), Jonathan Zlotnik (D)
- State Senator: John J. Cronin (D)
- Governor's Councilor: Paul DePalo (D)

=== Federal ===
- U.S. Representative: Lori Trahan
- U.S. Senators: Elizabeth Warren (D), Ed Markey (D)

== Education ==
Westminster is part of the Ashburnham-Westminster Regional School District along with Ashburnham.

The town has two schools. The Meetinghouse School serves students in grades K–1; the Westminster Elementary School, grades 2–5. Middle school students attend Overlook Middle School, and high school students attend Oakmont Regional High School.

Montachusett Regional Vocational Technical School is a vocational/technical high school) in nearby Fitchburg also serving Westminster students.

== Infrastructure ==
Public transportation for northern Worcester County is largely supplied by the Montachusett Regional Transit Authority (MART) fixed-route bus system. Wachusett station, located in West Fitchburg, is the western terminus of the MBTA Commuter Rail Fitchburg Line.

== Notable people ==
- Gamaliel Waldo Beaman, artist
- Abijah Bigelow, former U.S. Representative
- Elizabeth Jordan Carr, first American child conceived through IVF to be born on US soil
- Gregory Ciottone, Harvard professor, White House Consultant, pioneering physician in Counter-Terrorism Medicine
- Marcus A. Coolidge, former U.S. Senator
- John Ainsworth Dunn, furniture maker
- Avery Yale Kamila, journalist
- George M. Lane, former U.S. ambassador to North Yemen
- Nelson A. Miles, former Commanding General of the United States Army
- William H. Upham, fought at the Battle of Bull Run; 18th Governor of Wisconsin
- Mary Graustein, first woman to earn a doctorate in mathematics
