= Norvin Green =

American politician (1818–1893)

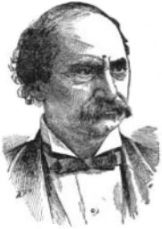

Member of the Kentucky House of Representatives
- In office August 5, 1867 – January 25, 1869
- Preceded by: Joseph B. Read
- Succeeded by: B. F. Camp
- Constituency: Louisville's 4th district
- In office August 5, 1850 – August 1, 1853
- Preceded by: Thomas Brown Jr.
- Succeeded by: Charles H. Allen
- Constituency: Henry County

Personal details
- Born: April 17, 1818 New Albany, Indiana, U.S.
- Died: February 13, 1893 (aged 74) Louisville, Kentucky, U.S.
- Resting place: Cave Hill Cemetery; Louisville, Kentucky, U.S.
- Spouse: Martha English (m. 1840)
- Children: 5
- Education: University of Louisville
- Occupation: Physician; businessman; politician

Norvin Green (April 17, 1818 – February 13, 1893) was an American businessman, physician and politician. He served as president of the Western Union Telegraph Company from 1878 until his death in 1893. He was a founding member and the first president of the American Institute of Electrical Engineers (AIEE), which later became part of the Institute of Electrical and Electronics Engineers (IEEE).

== Early life ==
Green was born in New Albany, Indiana, on April 17, 1818, the son of Virginians Joseph Strother Green and Susan Ball. The family moved to Breckinridge County, Kentucky, when he was a child. As a young man he operated a flatboat grocery on the Ohio River, then ran a business that cut and sold cord wood to steamboat operators. He was able to earn enough money from these ventures to finance his medical education at the University of Louisville, where he earned his degree in 1840. That same year he married Martha English of Carrollton, Kentucky. They had five children together.

== Career in Kentucky ==
Following his graduation, Dr. Green practiced medicine in Louisville and Carrollton, Kentucky. He served as a doctor at the Western Military Institute, where he became friends with future presidential candidate James Blaine, who was an instructor there. In 1850 Green was elected to the Kentucky House of Representatives, where he served until 1853 (and again in 1867). He was appointed to supervise the construction of a federal customs house and post office in Louisville in 1853. At that time he became interested in telegraphy, and invested in telegraph lines that connected Louisville and New Orleans. He formed, and became president of, the Southwestern Telegraph Company.

== Career in New York ==
Green moved to New York City in 1857. There he worked on the consolidation of many telegraph companies, culminating with the formation of Western Union in 1866, where he was named vice president. He stayed at Western Union for the rest of his life, except for three years when he returned to politics in Kentucky, being nominated to run for U.S. Senator. Upon the death of Western Union president William Orton in 1878, Green was named president of that company. He, along with others including Thomas Edison and Alexander Graham Bell, formed the American Institute of Electrical Engineers in 1884; he was its first president.

== Death ==
Norvin Green died on February 13, 1893, at his home in Louisville, Kentucky. He had been in ill health, and died from complications of intestinal disease. He was buried at Cave Hill Cemetery in Louisville.

His grandson, Norvin Hewitt Green, donated the land that became Norvin Green State Forest in New Jersey.
