= American Institute of Electrical Engineers =

Organisation

- Founded: 1884; 142 years ago
- Defunct: 1963

The American Institute of Electrical Engineers (AIEE) was a United States–based organization of electrical engineers that existed from 1884 through 1962. On January 1, 1963, it merged with the Institute of Radio Engineers (IRE) to form the Institute of Electrical and Electronics Engineers (IEEE).

== History ==
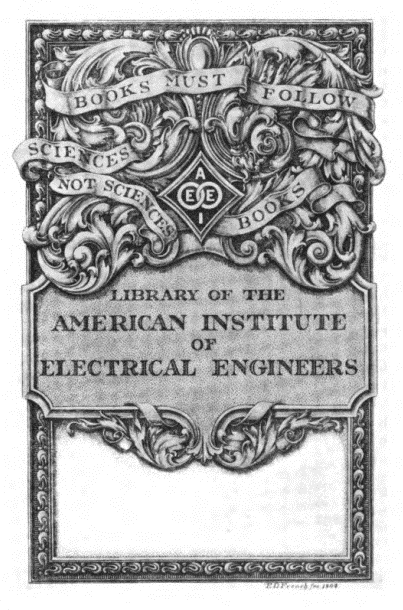
The original American Institute of Electrical Engineers bookplate at Harvard University Trust

The 1884 founders of the American Institute of Electrical Engineers (AIEE) included some of the most prominent inventors and innovators in the then new field of electrical engineering, among them Nikola Tesla, Thomas Alva Edison, Elihu Thomson, Edwin J. Houston, and Edward Weston. The purpose of the AIEE was stated "to promote the Arts and Sciences connected with the production and utilization of electricity and the welfare of those employed in these Industries: by means of social intercourse, the reading and discussion of professional papers and the circulation by means of publication among members and associates of information thus obtained." The first president of AIEE was Norvin Green, president of the Western Union Telegraph Company. Other notable AIEE presidents were Alexander Graham Bell (1891–1892), Charles Proteus Steinmetz (1901–1902), Bion J. Arnold (1903–1904), Schuyler S. Wheeler (1905–1906), Dugald C. Jackson (1910–1911), Ralph D. Mershon (1912–1913), Cyprien O. Mailloux (1913–1914), Michael I. Pupin (1925–1926), and Titus G. LeClair (1950–1951).

The first technical meeting of the AIEE was held during the International Electrical Exhibition of 1884 in Philadelphia, Pennsylvania, on October 7–8, at the Franklin Institute. After several years of operating primarily in New York City, the AIEE authorized local sections in 1902. These were first formed in the United States in Chicago and Ithaca, New York, in 1902, and then in other countries. The first section outside the United States, established in 1903, was in Toronto, Canada. AIEE's regional structure was soon complemented by a technical structure. The first technical committee of AIEE, the High Voltage Transmission Committee, was formed in 1903. Standardization work started in 1891 with the formation of a committee on units and standards, followed by a committee on standard wiring.

At the 50th anniversary of the organization, there were 10 women members, including Edith Clarke (associate member in 1923, member in 1933) and Mabel MacFerran Rockwell (associate member in 1928, member in 1935).

The formation of the AIEE Subcommittee on Large-Scale Computing in 1946 was considered a key milestone in the history of computer engineering, representing the first time that a professional association recognized the significance of computers and computing in electro-technology.

The early technical areas of interest of AIEE were electric power, lighting, and wired communications. Radio and wireless communications became the major focus of a rival organization, the Institute of Radio Engineers (the IRE, established 1912). The dynamic growth of radio technology and the emergence of the new discipline of electronics in the 1940s led to stiff competition between AIEE and IRE, with IRE showing faster growth in the 1950s and early 1960s, and attracting more students. In 1957, the IRE, with approximately 55,500 members, surpassed the AIEE in membership size; by 1962 the IRE had 96,500 members to the AIEE's 57,000.

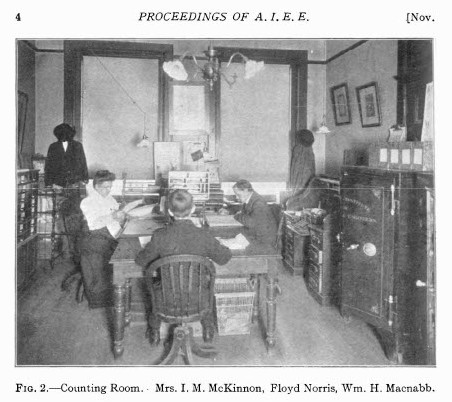
Mrs. I. M. McKinnon in the AIEE Counting Room

== Female Institute staff ==
Although the AIEE was a member-volunteer run organization, it relied on a paid staff for daily operations. Many of those employees were women. The November 1906 issue of the Proceedings of the AIEE (vol 25, no 11) published an article, "The Various Homes of the Institute," that documented the offices of the Institute's headquarters on the sixth and seventh floor of the White Building at 93 and 95 Liberty Street, New York, NY, one month before the move to their new location in the Engineering Societies Building at 25 to 33 West 39th Street. The photos that accompanied the article not only included images of the women who worked there, but unusual for the time, also named them. Female employees of the AIEE included Miss Mary E. Durant, Mrs. Emily H. Hough, Mrs. I. M. McKinnon, and Miss Hazel Pike.

== Institute's first logo ==
After the AIEE's founding in 1884, its member's badge was created in 1893 by a committee headed by Alexander Graham Bell, AIEE's president from 1891 to 1892. The badge's logo depicted Benjamin Franklin's kite, representative of the discovery that lightning carried electricity.

The design also showed a winding of gold wire with its midpoints crossed by a galvanometer's indicator, invoking the electrical engineer's Wheatstone bridge. Ohm's law and the letters "AIEE" were added in gold at the logo's base. The busy logo design was replaced four years later.

== Merger and evolution ==
The AIEE and the IRE merged in 1963 to form the Institute of Electrical and Electronics Engineers (IEEE), in short order becoming the world's largest technical society.

== See also ==
- Institute of Electrical and Electronics Engineers (IEEE)
- Institute of Radio Engineers (IRE)
