= Edward A. Rollins =

4th Commissioner of Internal Revenue of the United States (b. 1828, d. 1885)

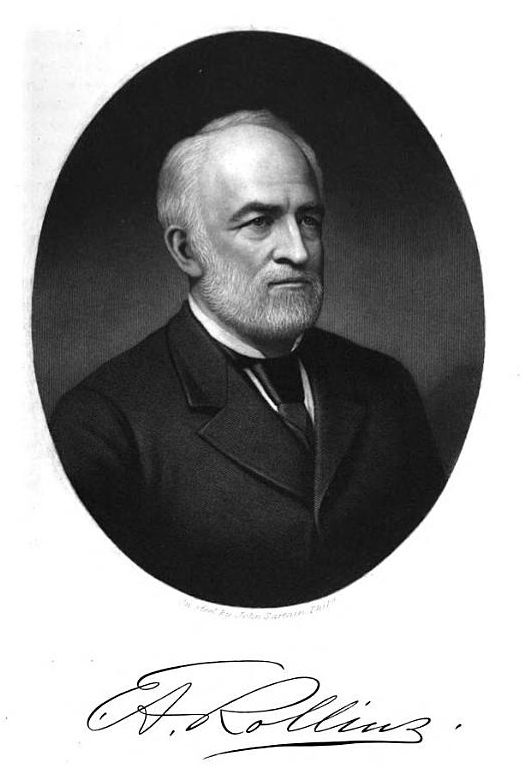

4th Commissioner of Internal Revenue
- In office November 1, 1865 – March 10, 1869
- President: Andrew Johnson; Ulysses S. Grant
- Preceded by: William Orton
- Succeeded by: Columbus Delano

Personal details
- Born: Edward Ashton Rollins; December 8, 1828 Wakefield, New Hampshire, U.S.
- Died: September 7, 1885 (aged 56) Hanover, New Hampshire, U.S.
- Children: 6: Willard; Marion; Lucy; Louisa; Phillip; Margaret
- Occupation: Lawyer; Banker; Politician; Railroad manager

Edward Ashton Rollins (December 8, 1828 – September 7, 1885) was an American lawyer, banker, and politician who served as the 4th Commissioner of Internal Revenue from 1865 to 1869. Rollins also served as the Speaker of the New Hampshire House of Representatives from 1861 to 1862.
