= Eugene Mailloux =

Eugene Mailloux (1878 in Stoney Point, Ontario – 1929) was the founder and president of Canada's first grocery store chain, M & P, in the early 1900s.

== M & P ==
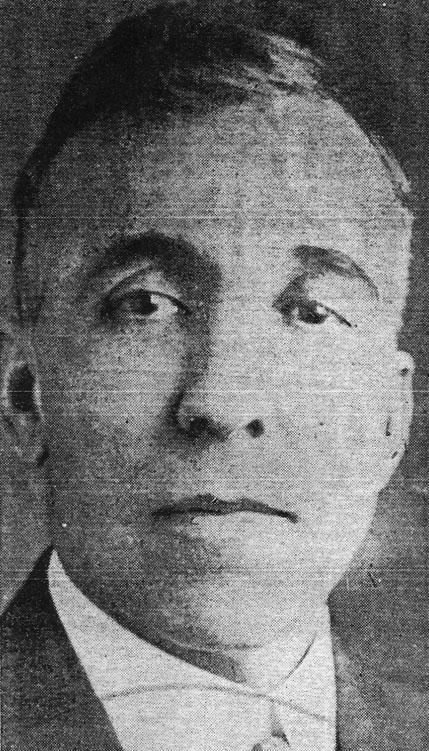
EUGENE MAILLOUX, Windsor, ON 1928

Mailloux opened five stores in Windsor in 1916. It was to become one of the first grocery chains in the country. Later, that number grew with the help of business partner and brother-in-law Ernie Parent, the 'P' in M & P.

As an employer, Mailloux was a fair man who took a real interest in the welfare of his employees. He asked for efficiency and a good day's work in return. "The hours were long ... sometimes 16 hours a day", remembered Henry, his son and business manager. "In those days, you would tell the clerk what you wanted, and he'd pick it up for you."

Mailloux bought his first store in 1909 in Ruscom, Ontario for $50. In 1913 he sold that store, moved to Windsor, and built his first M & P store. It was to be the first of over 30 in Windsor itself. One of his marketing schemes was the cash-and-carry system of buying. Until Mailloux developed the idea, many customers bought their groceries on credit. His new system ensured that the store would actually get paid. As a result, the stores offered lower prices than the competition.

In 1927, Mailloux sold M & P's 42 stores to National Grocers and stayed on as a vice-president. By 1929, there were 58 M & P stores in Windsor and Essex and Kent counties. By 1939, when the business closed, there were 66 such stores.

Eugene's first wife, Vendrille Parent, died at the birth of their son Honorious (Henry) in 1905. When Mailloux drowned in 1929, he was attempting to save the family maid who also drowned. At the time of his death, his wife Anne's children were Edward (5), Betty Ann (3), Mary Jean (2), and Thomas (1).
