= Paul Casamajor =

American chemist and inventor

- Born: 6 July 1831; Santiago de Cuba
- Died: 13 November 1887 (aged 56); New York City, U.S.
- Education: École Centrale Paris
- Known for: improvement of the filtration of turbid sugar solutions
- Scientific career
- Fields: chemistry

Signature
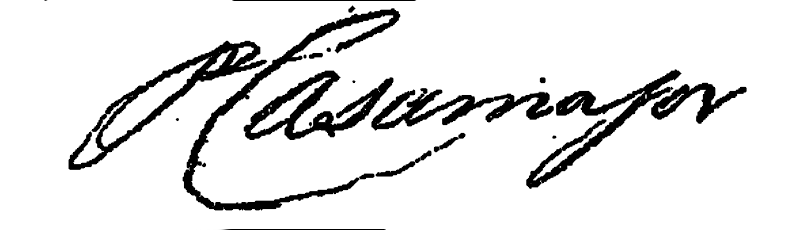

Paul Casamajor (July 6, 1831 – November 13, 1887) was a Cuban-born American chemist and inventor.

== Early life ==
Paul Casamajor was born in Santiago de Cuba in 1831. His father was French emigre who came from Haiti at the time of slave revolt then moved to Cuba; his mother Felicie de Saint-Félix Doutre, a Creole born in New Orleans. In 1845, at age 14, he came to the United States to pursue his studies in Portsmouth, New Hampshire. He then entered Harvard Scientific School. He stayed there for a brief period. Later on, he spent several years in France upon recommendation of his advisor. He went to École Centrale Paris and studied chemical engineering, graduating in 1854.

== Career ==
Returning to the US after completion of his bachelor's degree, he briefly served in the American Civil War in 1863. Afterwards, he established himself as a chemist in New York City and became interested in the oil industry in Pennsylvania. 1865, while working at The Enterprise Mining and Boring Co. he applied for a patent on 'improved mode' of drilling oil wells. He worked there as a superintendent until 1866, when an explosion at the plant prompted him to go back to New York.

In 1867, he found work as a chemist at the Havemeyer & Elder Sugar Refining Co. (the predecessor to the American Sugar Refining Co. and later renamed Domino Sugar Refinery) in Brooklyn. His prime concern at the sugar refinery was the easy filtration of turbid sugar liquors. He invented a filtration system using fine sawdust for this process most known as "Casamajor process." In November 1887, he died while still in the employ of this firm. Autopsy found that his sudden death was due to heart attack.

In his lifetime, Casamajor was a promoter of the American Chemical Society (ACS). As a prominent sugar chemist, he attended the society's first gathering in New York City in 1876. He was part of the first group who drafted and signed the letters sent to prospective members. He was elected librarian and held some office in ACS: secretary, vice-president and member of the board of directors. He also contributed to its journal, the oldest continuing scientific journal published in the United States. He also became the president of the Society's New York branch.

=== Patents ===
Patents released in America
| Number of patent | Date |
|---|---|
| U.S. patent 34,403 Making vinegar | 18 February 1862 |
| U.S. patent 50,902 Improved mode of operating oil-wells | 14 November 1865 |
| U.S. patent 50,903 Improved mode of operating oil-wells | 14 November 1865 |
| U.S. patent 237,134 Filtering apparatus | 1 February 1881 |
| U.S. patent 238,569 Lamp | 8 March 1881 |
| U.S. patent 243,757 Manufacturing soap | 5 July 1881 |
| U.S. patent 270,634 Filtering saccharine solutions etc. | 16 January 1883 |
| U.S. patent 316,075 Water and alkali proof fabric | 21 April 1885 |
| U.S. patent 355,437 Cloth-holder for filter presses | 4 January 1887 |
| U.S. patent 378,230 Process of treating liquids in vacuum pans | 21 February 1888 |
| U.S. patent 378,231 Process of treating cinchona bark | 21 February 1888 |
| U.S. patent 378,232 Process of treating saccharine solutions | 21 February 1888 |
| U.S. patent 378,233 Treatment of cinchona bark | 21 February 1888 |
| U.S. patent 394,956 Apparatus for cleansing and recovering sawdust for similar filtering substances | 25 December 1888 |

=== Writings ===
Casamajor was a frequent and industrious contributor to the Journal of the American Chemical Society with original papers, abstracts and reviews. He wrote and published several articles on his experiments with purifying and decolorizing sugar solutions, especially for Cebu 'mat' sugar that is deemed the "poorest" quality where it has its largest application.

- A method of measuring the angles of crystals by reflection without the use of a goniometer, 1867
- Action of water on lead, 1870
- On the purification of sugar solutions for the optical saccharometer, 1871
- Testing sugar solutions by means of areometers and the optical saccharometer, 1873
- Formula of Francoeur for correcting the indications of Beaume's areometer into corresponding specific gravities, 1874
- New portable apparatus which may be used as a filter pump or laboratory bellows, 1874
- On the expansion of sugar solutions, 1874

== Family ==
Paul Casamajor was naturalized as a US citizen in February 1870. He married Louise Jane Holberton (1847–1931) a French woman from Normandy, France. After his sudden death, his widow was left to take care of the family, which was very integrated in society in Brooklyn, a town that did not become part of New York City until 1898. Together, Paul and Louise were the parents of:

- George Casamajor (1868–1923)
- Henry Casamajor (1872–1939)
- Walter Casamajor (1873–1905)
- Alice Casamajor (1876–1957)
- Mary Casamajor (1878–1970), a librarian at the National Health Library
- Dr. Louis Casamajor (1881–1962), a doctor at the Neurological Institute of New York
- Martha Casamajor (1884–1974), a teacher at a public school
- Robert Casamajor (1885–1960) was a businessman in California.
- Pauline Casamajor (1887–1967)

Louise Casamajor invested some of her money in subscription shares in the New York firm Casamajor Filter Co. and later the British Columbia Sugar Refining Company.

== See also ==
- Benjamin Silliman Jr.
- Benjamin Tingley Rogers
