= Aubuchon Hardware =

American hardware store chain

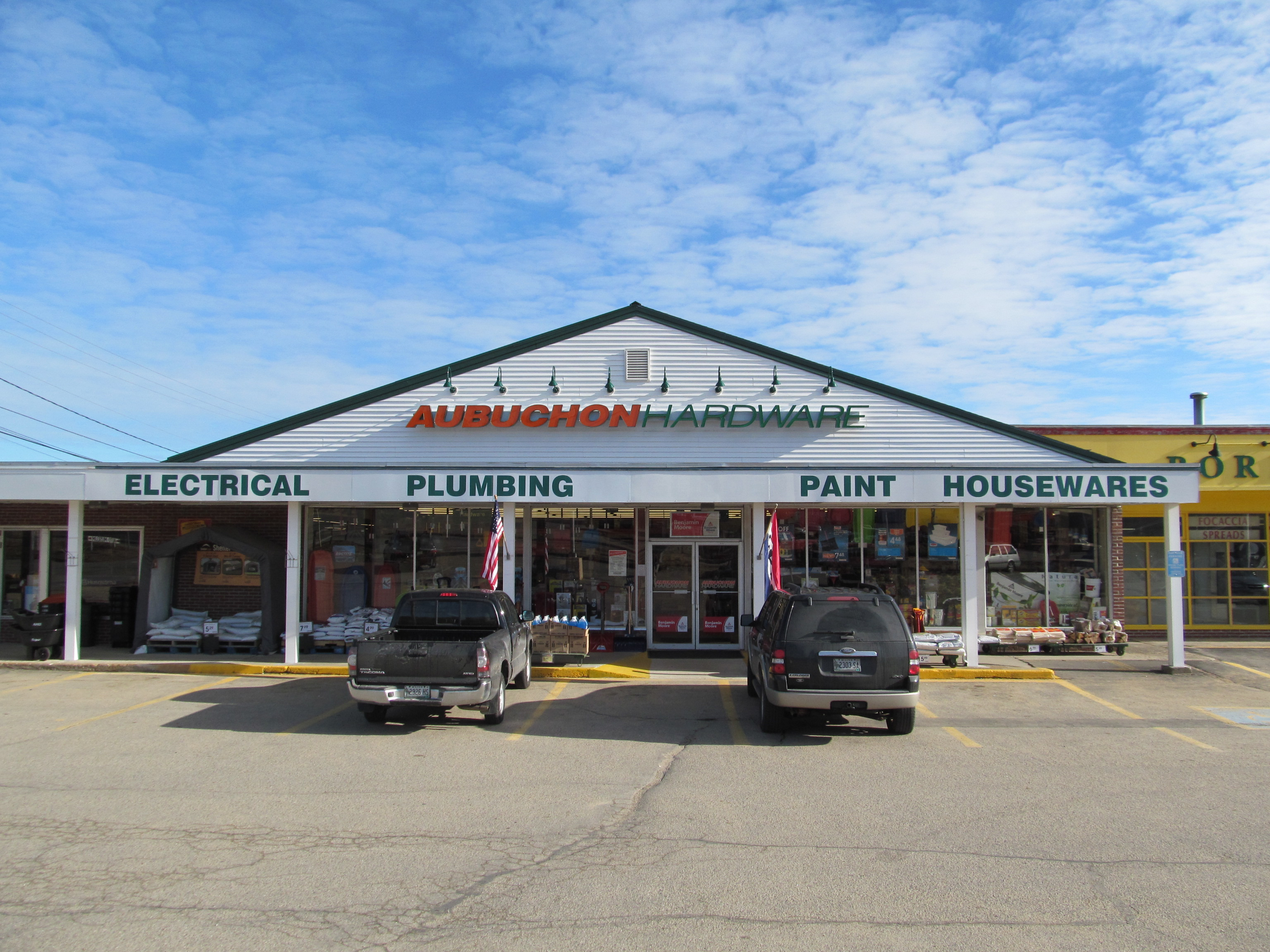
- An Aubuchon Hardware store in Wells, Maine
- Type: Private
- Industry: Retail (hardware)
- Founded: February 9, 1908, in Fitchburg, Massachusetts
- Founder: William E. Aubuchon Sr.
- Headquarters: Westminster, MA, United States
- Number of locations: 138
- Area served: New England and northeastern
- Key people: William Aubuchon IV; President and CEO
- Products: Paint, handtools, powertools, electrical, hardware, plumbing, lawn and garden, home appliances, heating and cooling, fasteners
- Website: www.hardwarestore.com

Aubuchon Hardware is a privately held hardware store chain based in the Northeastern United States. The company operates 130 paint and hardware stores across Vermont, Massachusetts, New Hampshire, Maine, Connecticut, Rhode Island, Pennsylvania, Maryland, Virginia, New Jersey, and New York.
