= Little Quittacas Pond =

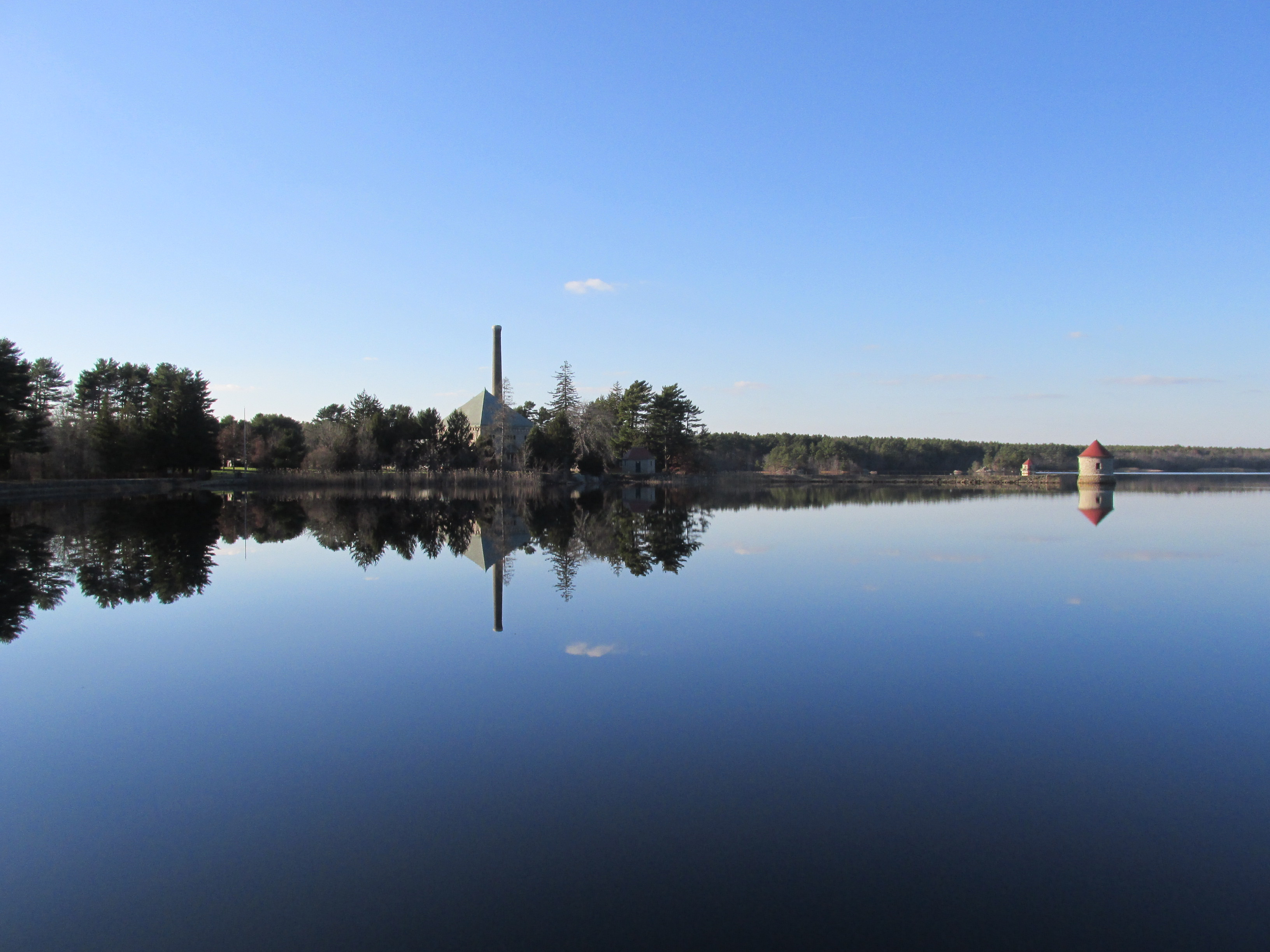

- Location within Massachusetts Location within the United States
- Location: Lakeville and Rochester, Massachusetts
- Coordinates: 41°47′30″N 70°55′00″W
- Type: reservoir
- Basin countries: United States
- Surface area: 297 acres (120 ha)
- Surface elevation: 49 ft (15 m)

Little Quittacas Pond is a lake/reservoir/pond within the towns of Lakeville and Rochester, in southeastern Massachusetts. Little Quittacas is one of the five great ponds of Southeastern Massachusetts that includes Long Pond, Assawompset Pond. Pocksha Pond, Great Quittacas and Little Quittacas Ponds. It is the location of the New Bedford Water Works. These lakes provide a source of drinking water to the city of New Bedford, the largest city in southeastern Massachusetts. Snipatuit Pond is an outlier pond that flows into Buzzards Bay, via the Mattapoisett River and is connected to Great Quittacas through Snipituit Brook. The other great ponds drain into Narragansett Bay through the Taunton River. The five ponds are the largest natural fresh watersheds in Massachusetts.
