= Long Pond =

Long Pond or Longs Pond may refer to:

== Anguilla ==
- Long Pond, Anguilla

== Canada ==
- Long Pond, St. John's, Newfoundland and Labrador
- A community in Conception Bay South
- Long Pond (Herring Cove, Nova Scotia)
- The purported birthplace of hockey in Windsor, Nova Scotia

== United States ==
=== Maine ===
- Long Pond (Belgrade Lakes)
- Long Pond (Hancock County, Maine), Hancock County, Maine
- Long Pond (Moose River)

=== Massachusetts ===
- Long Pond (West Yarmouth, Massachusetts)
- Long Pond (Lakeville, Massachusetts)
- Long Pond (Plymouth, Massachusetts)
- Long Pond (Rochester, Massachusetts)

=== New Jersey and New York ===
- Long Pond (New York), near Oswegatchie Camp, Lewis County, New York
- Long Pond (Chenango County, New York)
- Long Pond (Hamilton County, New York)
- Long Pond (Warren County, New York)
- Greenwood Lake, once known as Long Pond, New Jersey / New York
- Lake Owassa, once known as Long Pond, New Jersey
- Long Pond Ironworks State Park, Hewitt, New Jersey

=== Pennsylvania ===
- Long Pond, Pennsylvania, Pocono Mountains

=== Washington ===
- Longs Pond
