= Wampanoag (disambiguation) =

The Wampanoag are a Native American nation which currently consists of five tribes.

Wampanoag may also refer to:

- Wampanoag language
- Wampanoag Country Club
- Wampanoag Mills, a historic textile mill site
- Wampanoag Royal Cemetery, an historic colonial Native American cemetery in Middleboro, Massachusetts
- USS Wampanoag, a list of ships with the name
