= Avodah (disambiguation) =

Avodah or Avoda (Hebrew: עֲבוֹדָה), literally means "work, worship, and service" in Hebrew.

Avoda, or Avodah may also refer to:

- Israeli Labor Party, Israeli political party
- Avodah (Yom Kippur), Yom Kippur service
- Camp Avoda, Jewish boys' overnight camp in Massachusetts
- Kfar Avoda ("Work Village"), institutional settlement that operates a center for special education in central Israel
