= USS Wampanoag =

Two ships in the United States Navy have borne the name USS Wampanoag, for the Wampanoag tribe:

- The first USS Wampanoag (1864) was the lead ship of her class of screw frigate, in commission from 1867 to 1868, and was later renamed USS Florida.
- The second USS Wampanoag (ATA-202) was the auxiliary ocean tugboat USS ATA-202, in commission from 1944 to 1947, and placed in reserve and renamed USS Wampanoag in 1948. In 1959, while still in reserve, she was loaned to the United States Coast Guard as USCGC Comanche (WATA-202), later redesignated as the medium endurance cutter WMEC-202.
