= Leonards Pond (Rochester, Massachusetts) =

Pond in United States

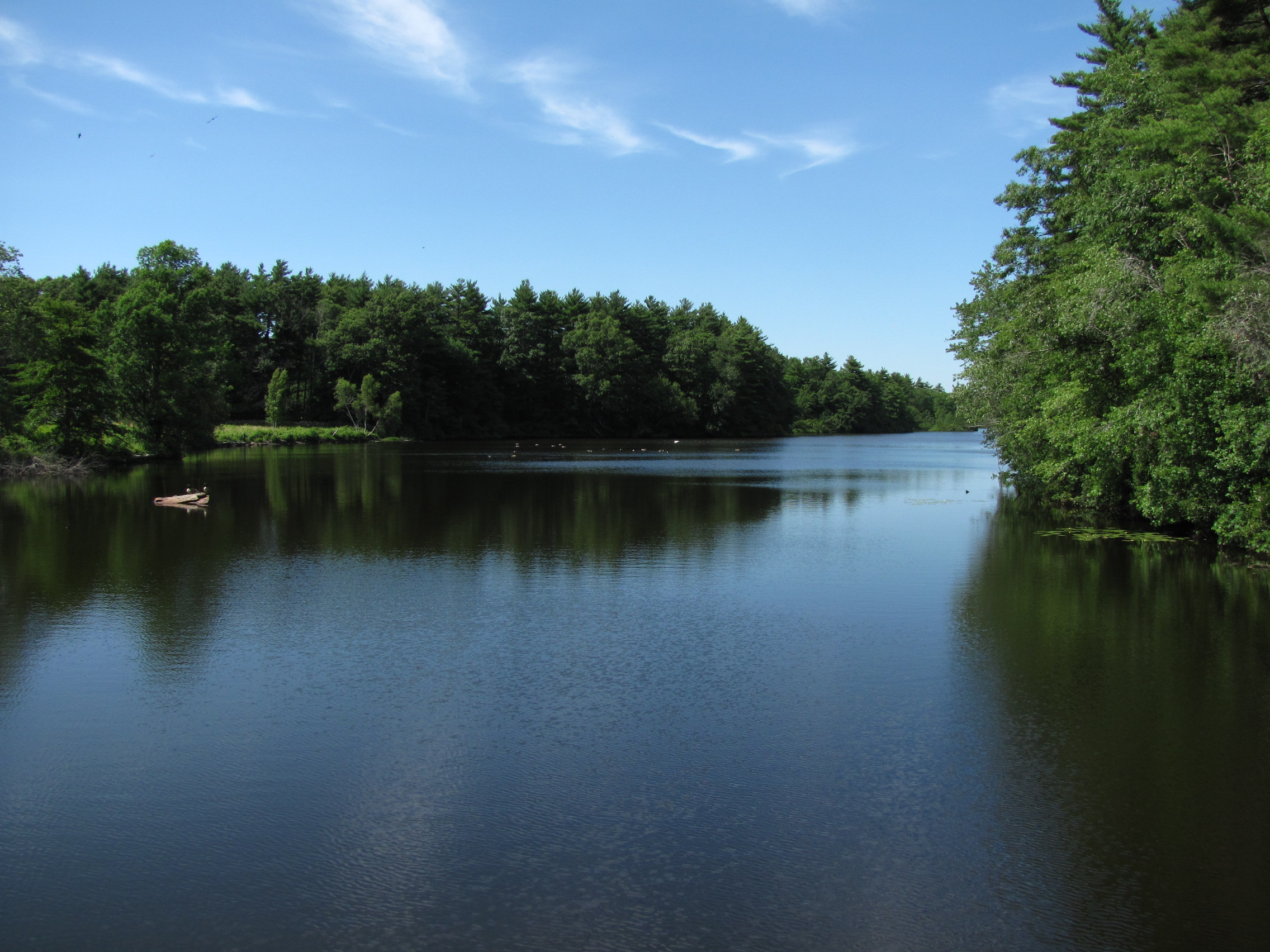

- Location within Massachusetts Location within the United States
- Location: Rochester, Massachusetts
- Coordinates: 41°45′25″N 70°48′07″W
- Primary inflows: Sippican River, west and east branches
- Primary outflows: Sippican River
- Basin countries: United States
- Surface area: 54 acres (22 ha)

Leonards Pond, also known as Leonard's Pond, is a 54-acre (220,000 m^{2}) pond in Rochester, Massachusetts. The pond is located west of Mary's Pond. The confluence of the west and east branches of the Sippican River is at this pond, and the Sippican River continues as the outflow.
