= Nemasket River =

River in Massachusetts, United States of America

Coordinates: 41°56′11″N 70°56′34″W

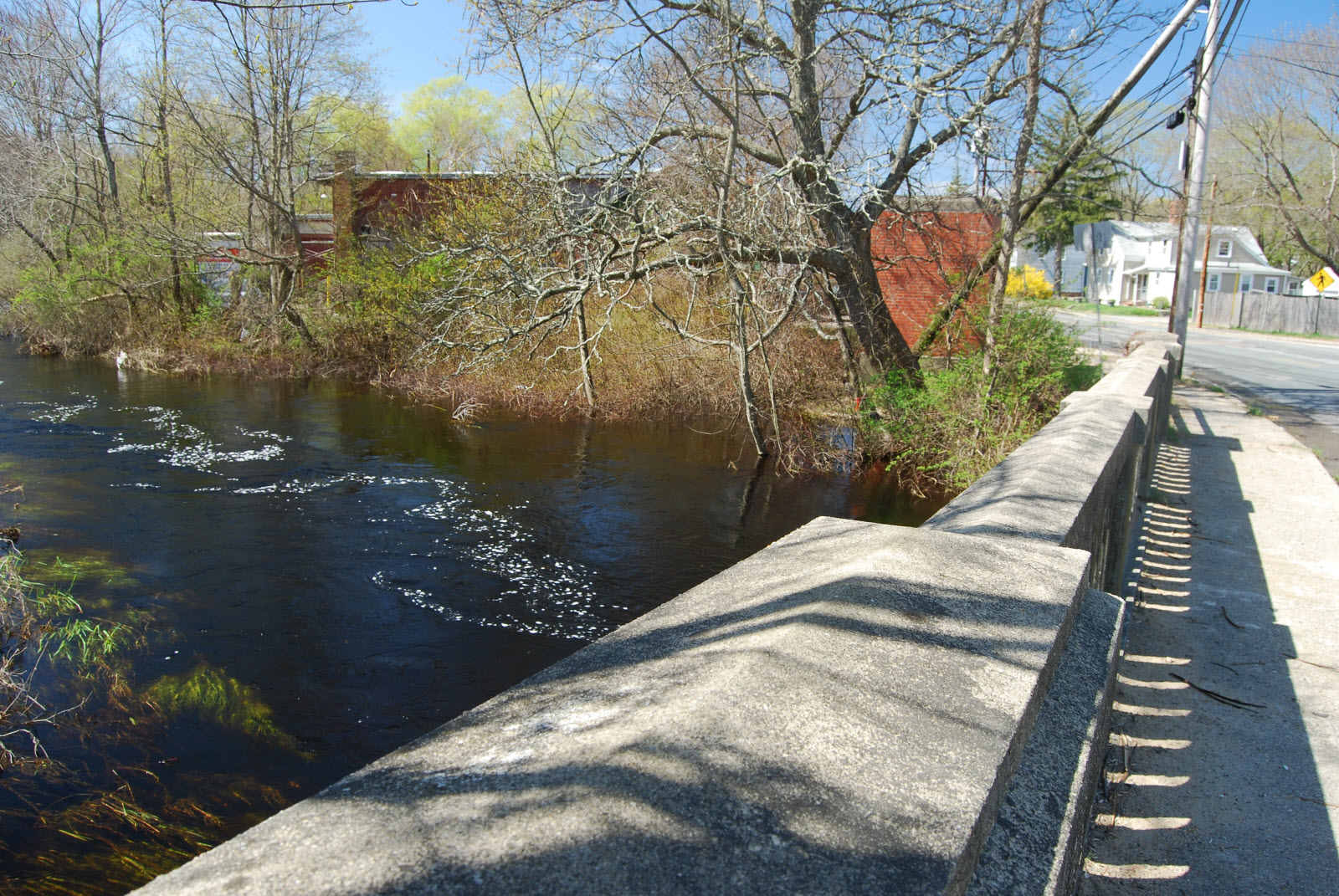
Nemasket River at East Main Street

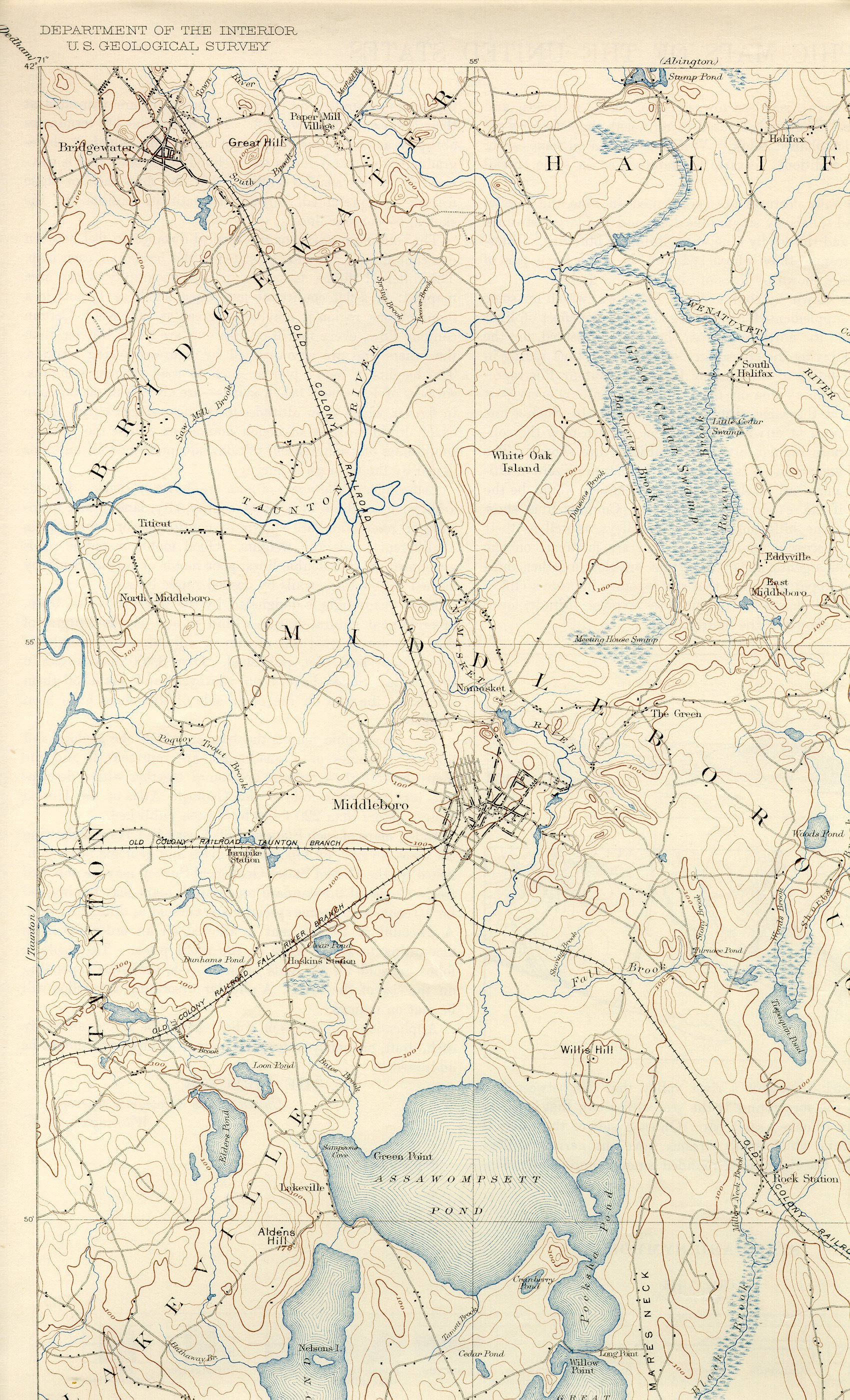
Nemasket River and environs

The Nemasket or Namasket River is a small river in southeastern Massachusetts. It flows north 11.2 miles (18.0 km) from Assawompset Pond in Lakeville and through Middleborough where it empties into the Taunton River. The Nemasket's sole tributary is Fall Brook, which drains out from Tispaquin Pond.

In Wampanoag Nemasket means Place where the fish are, because it is the largest alewife run on the Eastern Seaboard. The water is clear and there are several good places for launching unmotorized boats, with popular spots including Old Bridge Street, Wareham Street, and Oliver Mill Park on U.S. Route 44.

== History ==
The Native American Wampanoag Indians would leave their winter encampments inland and navigate the Taunton River to the Nemasket River in the early spring to take advantage of the alewife run and relocate to their summer encampment on Betty's Neck on Assawompsett Pond. When Oliver Mills built the factory that spanned the river, it created contention with the Wampanoags by forcing them to portage around the facility.

The remnants of Camp Joe Hooker, a training camp for Massachusetts regiments during the American Civil War, are located on the left side of Staples Shore Road.

During the late 19th century, several steamboats were operated along the Nemasket, offering cruises of the river and into Assawompsett Pond. Once a popular tourist destination, the cruise business ultimately ended upon construction of the dam where the river drains out of Assawompsett, which both restricted the ability for vessels to travel and also lowered the water level of the river. The tie-up for one side-paddle wheeler, the Assawompset, can still be seen off the canal that cuts across the right hand side of the marsh between Bridge Street and Vaughn Street.

== Ecology ==
The Nemasket boasts one of the largest herring runs on the eastern seaboard, with millions of alewife and blueback herring migrating from the Atlantic Ocean, up the Taunton River, up the Nemasket, and into the Assawompsett Pond complex, which contains the largest herring spawning area in the state, at over 5,000 acres. In addition to the herring, the Nemasket serves as habitat for numerous other diadromous species, including rainbow smelt, American eel, American shad, and striped bass.

Due to the Nemasket's connection to the Atlantic via the Taunton River, some marine mammal species have been known to make their way up the river. Harbor seals are seen on occasion, often in the spring when the herring migrate, and in 2005, a young harp seal was found in the Nemasket.

Other common wildlife in the area include deer, foxes, coyotes, river otters, raccoons, skunks, and opossums.
