= Long Pond (Rochester, Massachusetts) =

Pond in Massachusetts, United States

- Location within Massachusetts Location within the United States
- Location: Rochester, Massachusetts
- Coordinates: 41°46′00″N 70°51′21″W
- Primary outflows: Snipatuit Pond
- Basin countries: United States
- Surface area: 33 acres (13 ha)

Long Pond is a 33-acre (130,000 m^{2}) pond in Rochester, Massachusetts. The pond is connected to Snipatuit Pond, where its outflow goes. The water quality is impaired due to toxic metals.
