= Tispaquin Pond =

Pond in Massachusetts

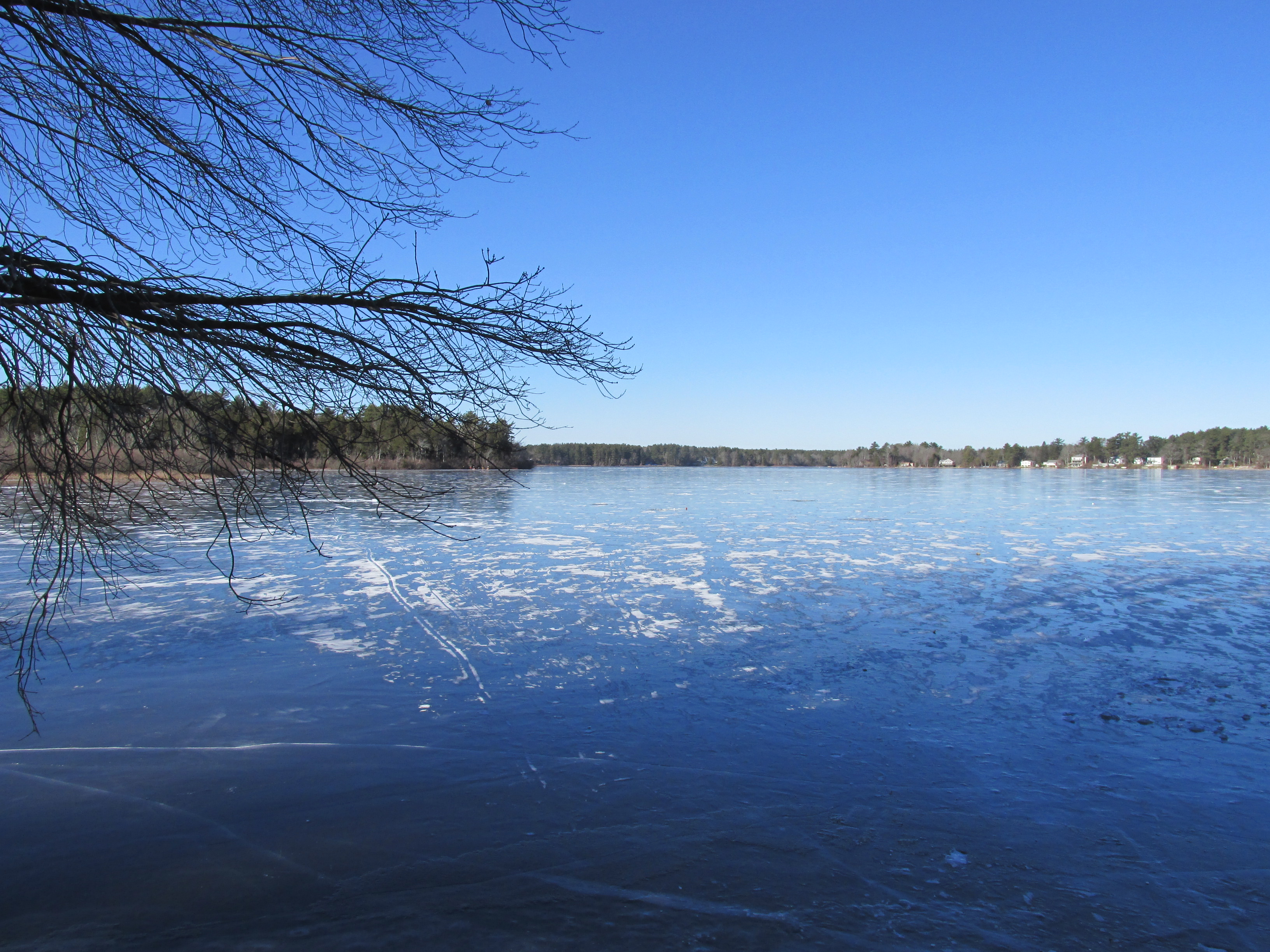
- Tispaquin Pond

- Location within Massachusetts
- Location: Middleborough, Massachusetts
- Coordinates: 41°51′48″N 70°51′31″W
- Primary inflows: Shorts Brook, Woods Brook
- Primary outflows: Fall Brook
- Basin countries: United States
- Surface area: 194 acres (79 ha)
- Average depth: 7 ft (2.1 m)
- Max. depth: 8 ft (2.4 m)

Tispaquin Pond is a 194-acre (0.79 km^{2}) warm water pond in Middleborough, Massachusetts. The pond is in the Taunton River Watershed. The average depth of the pond is seven feet, and the maximum depth is eight feet. Transparency of the water is six feet. Shorts Brook and Woods Brook provide the inflow for the pond. The outflow is Fall Brook, a tributary of the Nemasket River. Camp Avoda and Camp Yomechas are located on the pond. Access to the southern shore of the pond is via Eldon Street off Rocky Gutter Street. An unpaved launch area is suitable for car top boats and canoes. It is a popular spot for recreational fishing, particularly for yellow perch and largemouth bass.
