= Lakeville, Massachusetts =

- Town
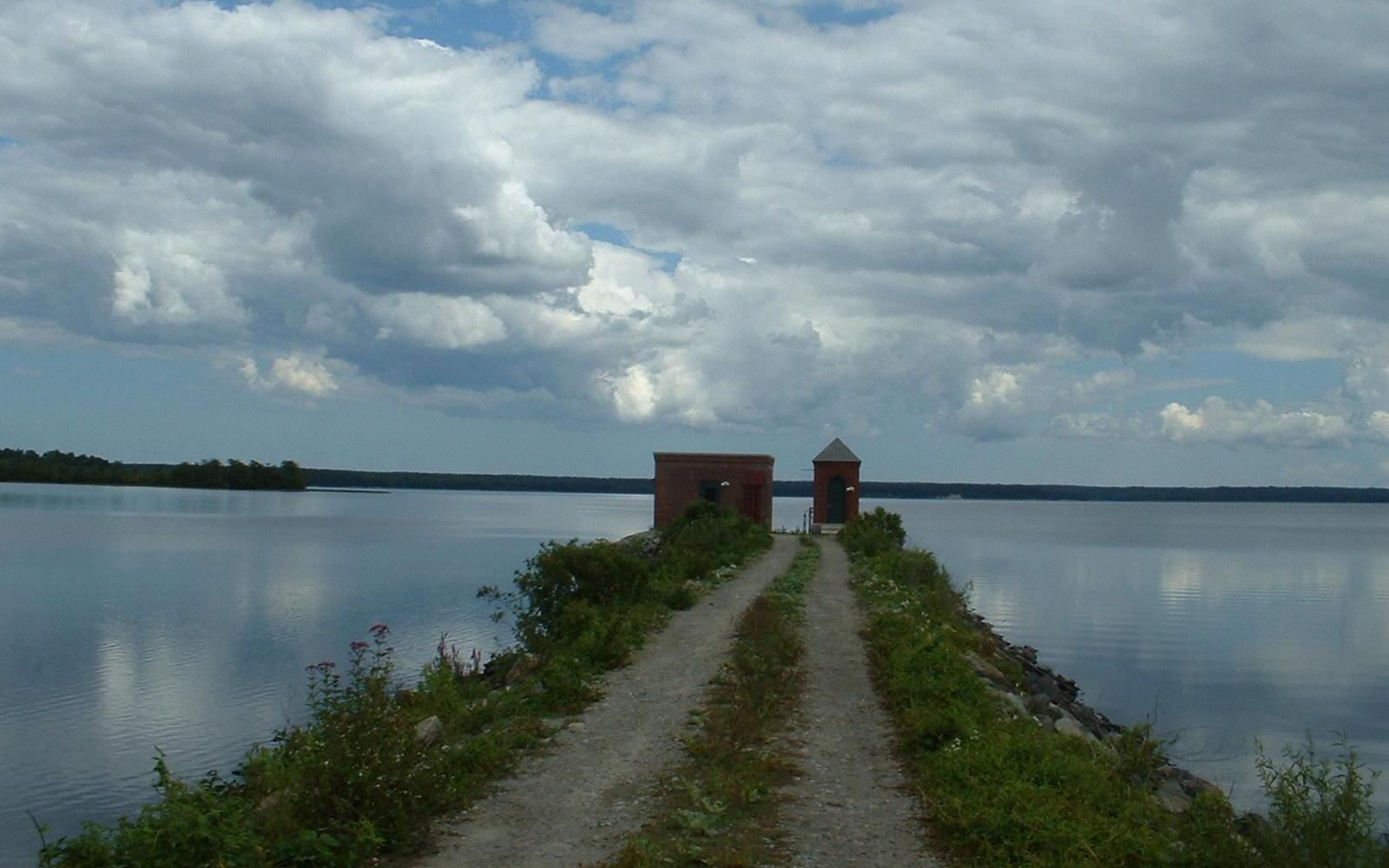
- Assawompset Pond, Lakeville

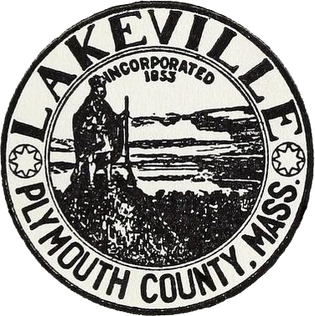
- Seal

- Location in Plymouth County in Massachusetts
- Coordinates: 41°50′45″N 70°57′00″W
- Country: United States
- State: Massachusetts
- County: Plymouth
- Settled: 1717
- Incorporated: May 13, 1853

Government
  - Type: Open town meeting

Area
  - Total: 36.1 sq mi (93.6 km^{2})
  - Land: 29.6 sq mi (76.6 km^{2})
  - Water: 6.6 sq mi (17.0 km^{2})
- Elevation: 89 ft (27 m)

Population (2020)
  - Total: 11,523
  - Density: 390/sq mi (150/km^{2})
- Time zone: UTC-5 (Eastern)
  - Summer (DST): UTC-4 (Eastern)
- ZIP code: 02347
- Area code: 508 / 774
- FIPS code: 25-33920
- GNIS feature ID: 0618344
- Website: www.lakevillema.org

Lakeville is a town in Plymouth County, Massachusetts, United States. The population was 11,523 at the 2020 census. It contains the village of North Lakeville.

== History ==
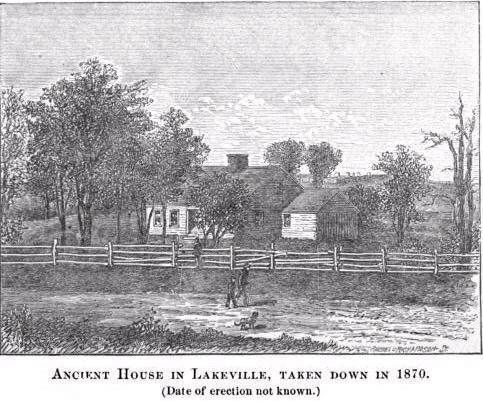
Ancient House in Lakeville

Native Americans inhabited southern Massachusetts for thousands of years prior to European colonization of the Americas, and Lakeville is a site with significant indigenous history.

Soewampset is listed as a noted habitation in a 1634 list of settlements in New England, suggesting that Assawompset Pond may take its name from a former Wampanoag settlement on its banks. The Wampanoag Royal Cemetery is located in modern-day Lakeville on a peninsula between Little and Great Quittacas Pond.

=== King Philip's War ===
In 1675, the body of John Sassamon, advisor to Governor Josiah Winslow, was discovered beneath the ice of Assawompset Pond. He was believed to have been murdered, and three Native Americans were arrested. On the testimony of only one witness (contrary to English law, which required the testimony of at least two witnesses in a murder trial), the three were sentenced to death by hanging. When the sentence was carried out, Tobias, senior counselor to the Pokanoket sachem King Philip, and a second supposed accomplice died. When the attempt was made to carry out the sentence on the third "accomplice"—Tobias's son—the rope broke and he was imprisoned, having first confessed to the killings. His confession is widely believed to have been coerced.

The death of John Sassamon and the subsequent trial and execution of the Wampanoag men convicted of his murder is broadly acknowledged as the trigger for King Philip's War, though tensions between English colonists and indigenous groups had been building for decades. During part of the war, Metacomet and his forces sheltered in Lakeville at Assawompset Pond, prior to Metacomet's capture in Bristol, Rhode Island.

The Wampanoag settlement at Assawompset Pond persisted until at least the early 1800s, as attested by burials in the Wampanoag Royal Cemetery, and the biography of Benjamin Simonds.

=== 18th century to present ===
The first recorded non-native settlement of Lakeville was in 1705 by a man named Peirce, "whose descendants are very numerous." Lakeville was settled on a larger scale in 1717 as a western parish of Middleborough. It was incorporated as a separate town in 1853. One notable resident from Lakeville who fought in the American Revolution was a Wampanoag man named Benjamin Simonds, who was an aide-de-camp to George Washington at Valley Forge, who died in either 1831 or 1836. He was likely a part of one of the two militias from Lakeville, the Pond Militia Company or the Beech Woods Company of Minutemen. They were combined into Middleborough's Fourth Company of Foot, in which he served. He ended up becoming a local celebrity, both because of his service and because he was the last fully Wampanoag person to live on Assawompset Pond.

Ninety-one men from Lakeville served in the American Civil War, eighty-five in the army and six in the navy. Three churches have been built in the town, the first in 1725, the second in 1751 and the third one in 1835. Ocean Spray is headquartered in Lakeville.

== Etymology ==
The town's name comes from the system of lakes in the town, including Assawompset Pond, Great Quittacas Pond, Little Quittacas Pond, Pocksha Pond, and Long Pond. Long Pond is the source of the Acushnet River, and Assawompset Pond is the source of the Nemasket River, which feeds the Taunton River. The indigenous name for Lakeville was Soewampset.

== Geography ==
According to the United States Census Bureau, the town has a total area of 36.1 square miles (93.6 km^{2}), of which 29.6 square miles (76.6 km^{2}) is land and 6.6 square miles (17.0 km^{2}), or 18.17%, is water. Lakeville is irregularly shaped, bordered by Middleborough to the northeast and east, Rochester to the southeast, Freetown to the south and southwest, and Berkley and Taunton to the west. Its borders with Taunton, Berkley and Freetown are also a central section of the western borders of Plymouth County. Lakeville is roughly at the center of what is considered Southeastern Massachusetts, and is approximately 20 miles (32 km) west of Plymouth, 5 miles (8.0 km) north of New Bedford, 30 miles (48 km) east of Providence, Rhode Island, and 40 miles (64 km) south of Boston.

The town's geography is dominated by its namesake lakes, which are referred to as "ponds" in general usage. In addition to the main bodies of water and their feeder brooks and rivers, there are also several smaller ponds, as well as many brooks and swamps, including the Casual Swamp and the Cedar Swamp, which is protected as a part of the Assonet Cedar Swamp Wildlife Management Area, which is operated by the Massachusetts Audubon Society. There are also several small conservation areas, four country clubs and two parks, including the Ted Williams Camp, which was once the site of a summer baseball camp run by Boston Red Sox legend and Baseball Hall of Fame member Ted Williams. According to Lakeville, Massachusetts Gravestone Inscriptions 1711–2003 by Jean Douillette, there are 31 known cemeteries in Lakeville, or almost one per square mile.

== Demographics ==
Historical population
Year	Pop.	±%
1860	1,160	—
1870	1,159	−0.1%
1880	1,008	−13.0%
1890	935	−7.2%
1900	958	+2.5%
1910	1,141	+19.1%
1920	1,419	+24.4%
1930	1,574	+10.9%
1940	1,780	+13.1%
1950	2,066	+16.1%
1960	3,209	+55.3%
1970	4,376	+36.4%
1980	5,931	+35.5%
1990	7,785	+31.3%
2000	9,821	+26.2%
2010	10,602	+8.0%
2020	11,523	+8.7%
2024*	12,262	+6.4%
* = population estimate. Source: United States Census records and Population Estimates Program data.

As of the data of 2026, there were 12,200+ people and 4,200 households residing in the town. The population density was 329.14 inhabitants per square mile (127.08/km^{2}). In 2000, there were 3,662 housing units at an average density of 122.5 per square mile (47.3/km^{2}). More recent estimates are not available. As of 2026, the expected racial makeup of the town was 66.5% White, 5.3% African American, 0.3% Native American, 1.2% Asian, 0.005% Pacific Islander, and 4.6% from two or more races. Hispanic or Latino of any race were 22.1% of the population. Common ethnicities include: Portuguese, Italian, Mexican, Puerto Rican, Dominican, Cape Verdean. Other communities include in smaller population include: Cuban, French Canadian, Irish. The most common European ethnicity in the town is Portuguese, Hispanic & Latino is Mexican, African American being of Cape Verdean descent. Sources include surveys, US Census.

3.8% of Lakeville's residents are foreign-born.

There were 3,292 households, out of which 40.0% had children under the age of 18 living with them, 69.7% were married couples living together, 8.0% had a female householder with no husband present, and 19.2% were non-families. 14.7% of all households were made up of individuals, and 6.2% had someone living alone who was 65 years of age or older. The average household size was 2.91 and the average family size was 3.24.

In the town, the population was spread out, with 27.4% under the age of 18, 5.7% from 18 to 24, 31.1% from 25 to 44, 24.4% from 45 to 64, and 11.3% who were 65 years of age or older. The median age was 38 years. For every 100 females, there were 93.9 males. For every 100 females age 18 and over, there were 91.1 males. Of the population 25 years and older in Lakeville, 87.2% have a high school degree or higher. 32.7% of this demographic group has a bachelor's degree or higher. 11% of Lakeville residents 25 years or older have a graduate or professional degree. The average person's commute to work is 33.8 minutes and 2.6% of the town's population above the age of 25 is unemployed.

The median income for a household in the town was $70,495, and the median income for a family was $75,838. Males had a median income of $51,321 versus $31,374 for females. The per capita income for the town was $26,046. About 1.9% of families and 3.0% of the population were below the poverty line, including 2.8% of those under age 18 and 8.5% of those age 65 or over.

Lakeville's median household income and the median house value are above the Massachusetts state average.

== Government ==
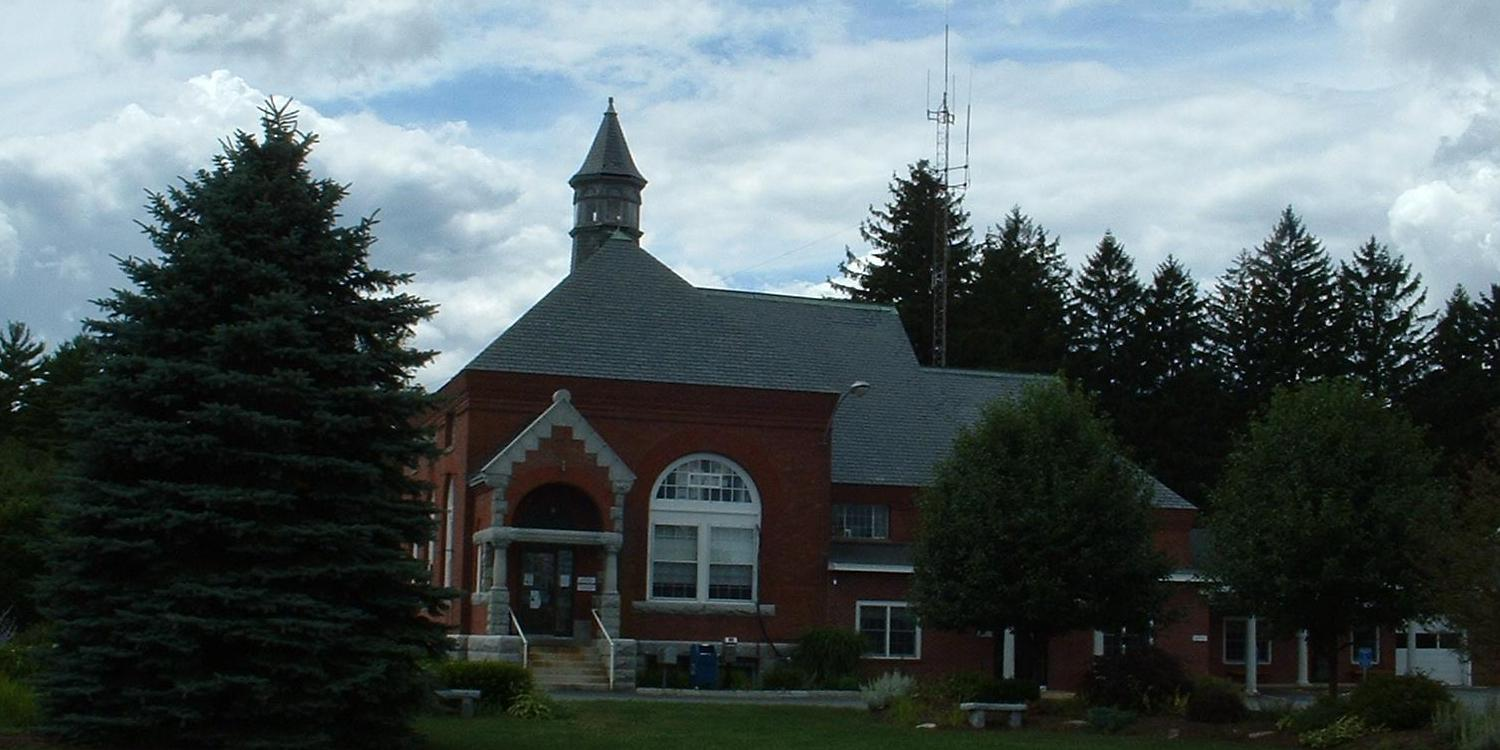
Lakeville Town Hall

Lakeville is governed with the Open Town Meeting form of government, and is led by a town administrator and a board of selectmen. The town has its own police department and a single fire station, located next to the town hall. The "new" library is located behind the old town hall, just across Route 18 from its former location at the junction of Routes 18 and 105. The town of Lakeville also has other services, such as a Council on Aging and a historical commission. Lakeville is one of the few towns in Massachusetts to have more registered Republicans than registered Democrats.

On the state level, Lakeville is represented by Norman Orrall in the Massachusetts House of Representatives as a part of the Twelfth Bristol District. The town is represented in the State Senate by Senator Michael J. Rodrigues (D-Westport), as a part of the First Bristol and Plymouth District, which also includes Fall River, Freetown, Rochester, Somerset, Swansea and Westport.

On the national level, Lakeville is a part of Massachusetts's 4th congressional district, and is currently represented by Jake Auchincloss. The state's senior (Class I) member of the United States Senate, elected in 2012, is Elizabeth Warren. The junior (Class II) senator, elected in 2013, is Ed Markey.

Lakeville is a very conservative town, even by Massachusetts standards. The last Democrat to carry the town in a Presidential election is Al Gore, who carried it in 2000.

== Education ==
Since 1959, Lakeville has shared its school department with Freetown, creating the Freetown-Lakeville Regional School District. Lakeville operates several schools for its school aged population. Assawompset Elementary School is operated jointly with Freetown for grades K–3. The George R. Austin Intermediate School is operated jointly with Freetown for grade 4 and 5. Freetown-Lakeville Middle School is operated jointly with Freetown for grades 6–8, and Apponequet Regional High School is jointly operated with Freetown for grades 9–12. Apponequet's colors are navy, white, and red, their nickname is the "Lakers," and their mascot was a Wampanoag brave, but after a sensitivity issue among the faculty at Apponequet, it was changed to an "A". The school, like several others in the region, used to use the spear logo made famous by Florida State University and the Washington Redskins for its athletics marks, but this was deemed to promote violence, so it was replaced with the "A". Their teams compete in the South Coast Conference, and their chief rival is Old Rochester Regional High School in Mattapoisett.

== Transportation ==
Massachusetts Route 140, a four-lane divided highway, passes through the town on its trip between Route 24 in nearby Taunton and Interstate 195 in New Bedford. The town is also crossed by Route 18, Route 79 and Route 105, as well as a short, 0.4-mile (0.64 km) stretch of U.S. Route 44 in the far northern point of town. Route 79's eastern terminus is at its intersection with Route 105 on the town line. Additionally, three exits of Interstate 495 are located just over the town line in Middleborough, granting access to Routes 44, 18 and 105 (from north to south in order).

Lakeville station, served by the seasonal CapeFlyer service, is on the Middleborough/Lakeville border. The nearest MBTA Commuter Rail station is Middleborough. The nearest private airfield is in Taunton; the nearest regional airport is in New Bedford, and the nearest national and international airport is T. F. Green Airport in Warwick, Rhode Island.
