= Rochester, Massachusetts =

Town in Massachusetts

- Town
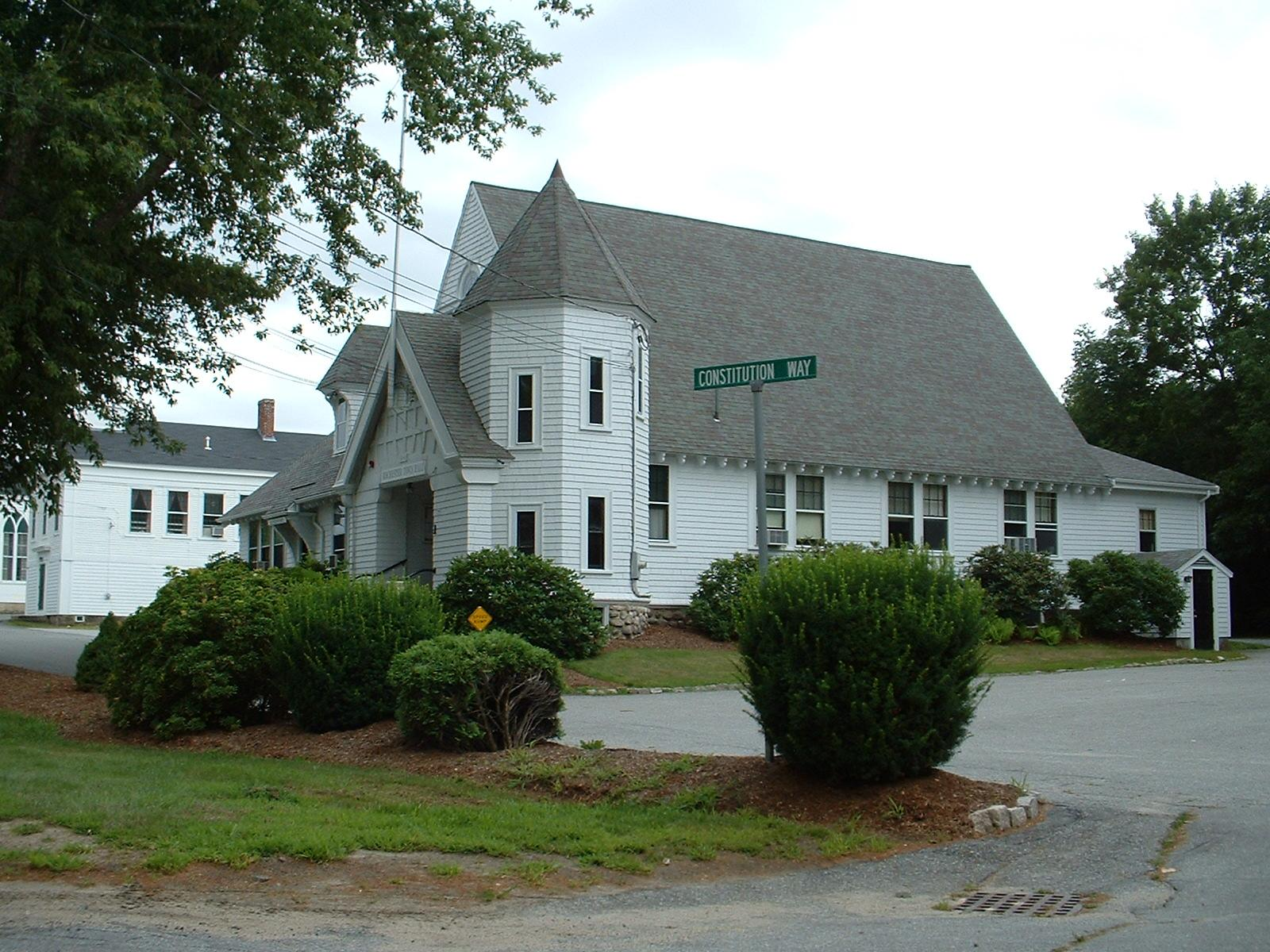
- Rochester Town Hall

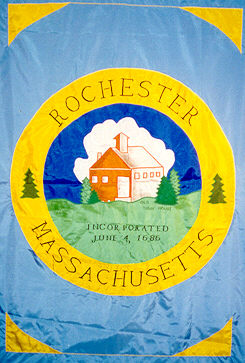
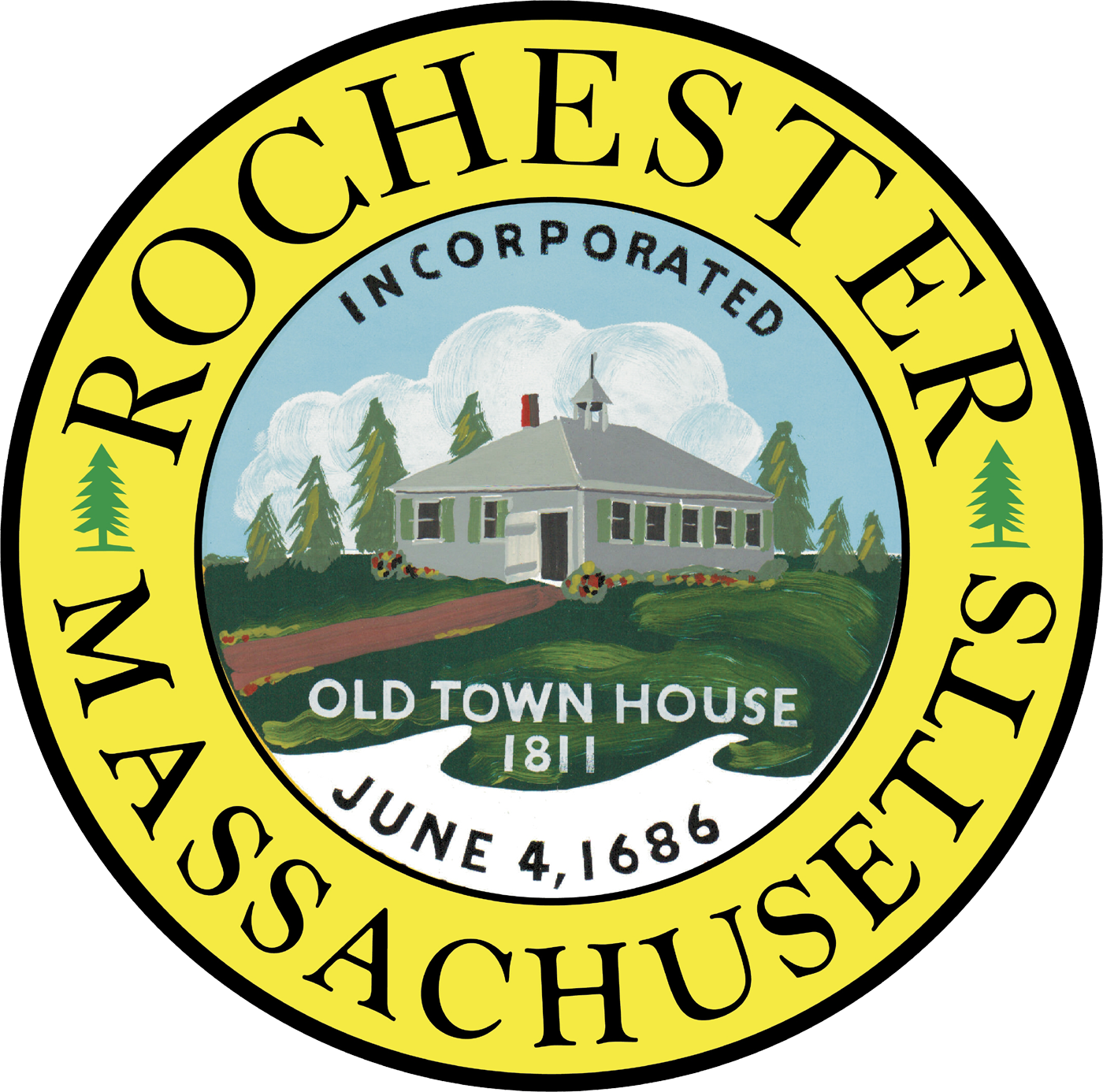
- Flag Seal

- Location in Plymouth County in Massachusetts
- Coordinates: 41°43′54″N 70°49′14″W
- Country: United States
- State: Massachusetts
- County: Plymouth
- Settled: 1679; 347 years ago
- Incorporated: 1686; 340 years ago

Government
  - Type: Open town meeting

Area
  - Total: 36.4 sq mi (94.2 km^{2})
  - Land: 33.9 sq mi (87.9 km^{2})
  - Water: 2.5 sq mi (6.4 km^{2})
- Elevation: 30 ft (9 m)

Population (2020)
  - Total: 5,717
  - Density: 170/sq mi (65/km^{2})
- Time zone: UTC−5 (Eastern)
  - Summer (DST): UTC−4 (Eastern)
- ZIP Codes: 02770 (Rochester); 02576 (West Wareham)
- Area code: 508/774
- FIPS code: 25-57600
- GNIS feature ID: 0618350
- Website: www.townofrochestermass.com

Rochester is a town in Plymouth County, Massachusetts, United States. The population was 5,717 at the 2020 census.

Rochester is a part of the South Coast region of Massachusetts which encompasses the cities and towns that surround Buzzards Bay (excluding the Elizabeth Islands, Bourne and Falmouth), Mount Hope Bay and the Sakonnet River.

== History ==
Rochester was settled in 1679 on the lands called "Sippican" by the local Wampanoags, along the coast of Buzzards Bay. (Sippican was the name of the local tribe.) It originally included the lands of Mattapoisett, Marion and parts of Wareham (which was lost when Wareham was founded in 1739). The town was officially incorporated on June 4, 1686, as Rochester, and was named for Rochester, England, from which early settlers to the town came. The town originally thrived with the early shipbuilding and whaling trade in Mattapoisett Harbor. However, in 1852 and 1857 the towns of Marion and Mattapoisett, respectively, were separated and incorporated as separate towns, thus landlocking Rochester. Since that time, the town has become mostly rural-residential, with some farms located in town. Rochester is a "Right to Farm" community.

== Geography ==
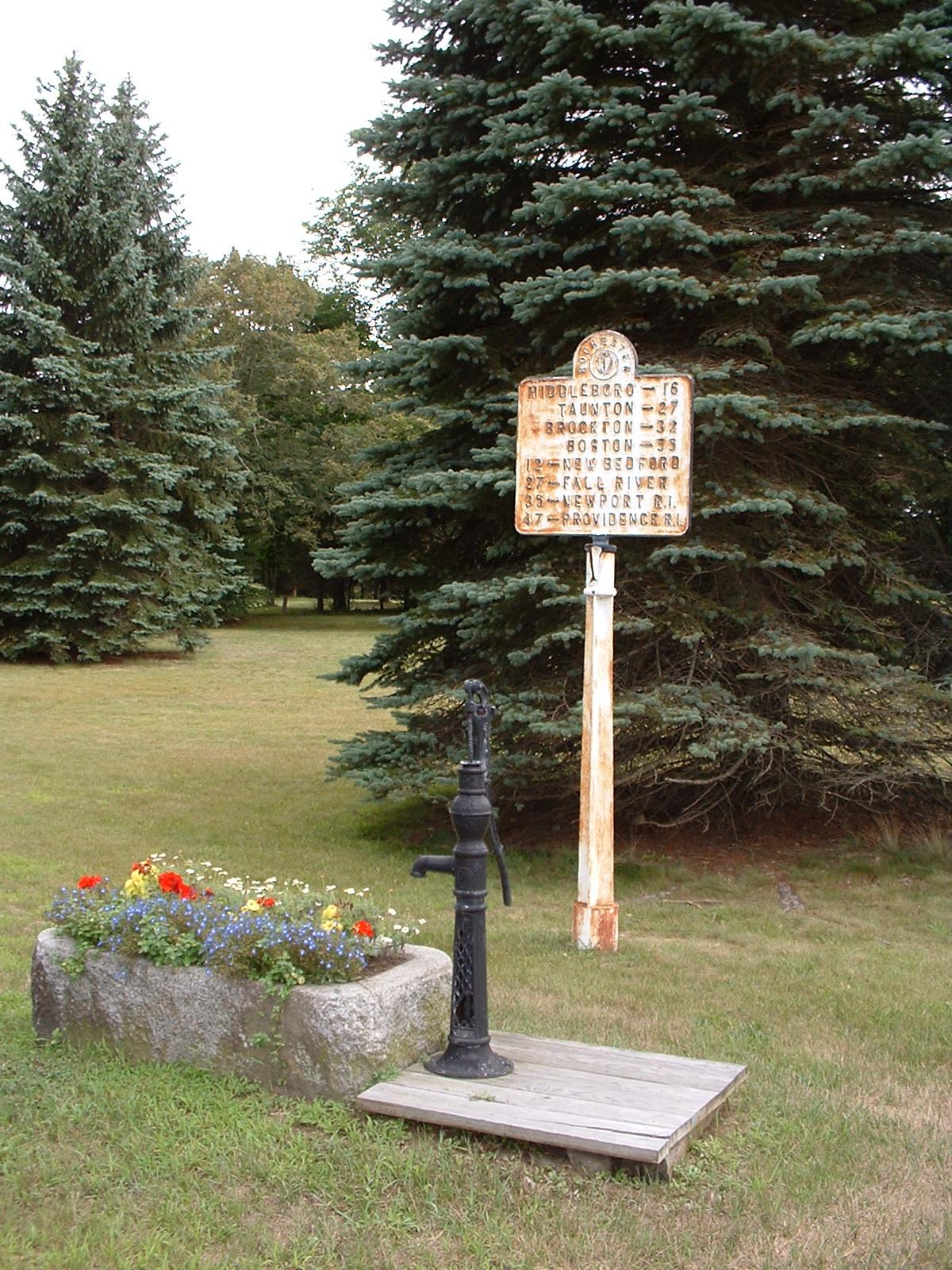
An old road sign and water pump at the Town Common, on Route 105

According to the United States Census Bureau, the town has a total area of 36.4 square miles (94 km^{2}), of which 33.9 square miles (88 km^{2}) is land and 2.5 square miles (6.5 km^{2}), or 6.76%, is water. Rochester is located along the western border of Plymouth County, and is bordered by Lakeville and Middleborough to the north, Wareham and Marion to the east, Mattapoisett to the south, and Acushnet and Freetown to the west. The town's localities include Bisbee Corner, East Rochester, North Rochester and Varella Corner. The town is about 10 miles (16 km) northeast of New Bedford, 40 miles (64 km) east of Providence, Rhode Island, and 60 miles (97 km) south of Boston.

The Mattapoisett and Sippican rivers flow through the town, emptying into Buzzards Bay. Most of the town's brooks also flow into these two rivers. The source of the Mattapoisett, Great Quittacas Pond and Little Quittacas Pond, lie on the border between the town and Lakeville. Other ponds include Snipatuit Pond, Long Pond, Snow's Pond, Hartley's Mill Pond, Mary's Pond, Leonards Pond, and Hathaway Pond, as well as several smaller bodies of water. The town has two wildlife management areas and a fish hatchery, as well as a small recreation area along Mary's Pond and two parks near the town center. The town is also the site of the Sippican Rod & Gun Club, near the Haskell Swamp Wildlife Management Area.

=== Climate ===
According to the Köppen Climate Classification system, Rochester has a humid subtropical climate, abbreviated "Cfa" on climate maps. The hottest temperature recorded in Rochester was 102 °F (38.9 °C) on July 22, 1991, while the coldest temperature recorded was −18 °F (−27.8 °C) on January 22, 1961.

Climate data for Rochester, Massachusetts, 1991–2020 normals, extremes 1951–present
Month	Jan	Feb	Mar	Apr	May	Jun	Jul	Aug	Sep	Oct	Nov	Dec	Year
Record high °F (°C)	68 (20)	69 (21)	82 (28)	94 (34)	97 (36)	101 (38)	102 (39)	101 (38)	97 (36)	86 (30)	77 (25)	75 (24)	102 (39)
Mean maximum °F (°C)	58.4 (14.7)	57.9 (14.4)	65.6 (18.7)	78.1 (25.6)	87.2 (30.7)	91.7 (33.2)	94.2 (34.6)	92.1 (33.4)	87.0 (30.6)	78.0 (25.6)	69.4 (20.8)	61.2 (16.2)	96.2 (35.7)
Mean daily maximum °F (°C)	37.9 (3.3)	39.7 (4.3)	46.2 (7.9)	57.0 (13.9)	67.5 (19.7)	76.5 (24.7)	82.4 (28.0)	81.0 (27.2)	73.7 (23.2)	62.5 (16.9)	52.3 (11.3)	43.1 (6.2)	60.0 (15.6)
Daily mean °F (°C)	29.0 (−1.7)	30.6 (−0.8)	37.1 (2.8)	47.1 (8.4)	57.2 (14.0)	66.3 (19.1)	72.5 (22.5)	71.1 (21.7)	64.1 (17.8)	53.1 (11.7)	43.5 (6.4)	34.7 (1.5)	50.5 (10.3)
Mean daily minimum °F (°C)	20.1 (−6.6)	21.6 (−5.8)	28.1 (−2.2)	37.3 (2.9)	46.8 (8.2)	56.1 (13.4)	62.5 (16.9)	61.2 (16.2)	54.5 (12.5)	43.7 (6.5)	34.7 (1.5)	26.4 (−3.1)	41.1 (5.0)
Mean minimum °F (°C)	3.0 (−16.1)	5.9 (−14.5)	14.0 (−10.0)	26.4 (−3.1)	35.6 (2.0)	44.7 (7.1)	52.2 (11.2)	51.1 (10.6)	40.2 (4.6)	30.5 (−0.8)	21.3 (−5.9)	12.4 (−10.9)	0.8 (−17.3)
Record low °F (°C)	−18 (−28)	−15 (−26)	−9 (−23)	9 (−13)	24 (−4)	35 (2)	42 (6)	34 (1)	28 (−2)	18 (−8)	8 (−13)	−12 (−24)	−18 (−28)
Average precipitation inches (mm)	4.49 (114)	3.83 (97)	5.73 (146)	4.91 (125)	3.58 (91)	4.08 (104)	3.36 (85)	4.05 (103)	4.36 (111)	5.05 (128)	4.69 (119)	5.25 (133)	53.38 (1,356)
Average snowfall inches (cm)	10.7 (27)	9.0 (23)	4.5 (11)	0.6 (1.5)	0.0 (0.0)	0.0 (0.0)	0.0 (0.0)	0.0 (0.0)	0.0 (0.0)	0.0 (0.0)	0.1 (0.25)	5.9 (15)	30.8 (77.75)
Average extreme snow depth inches (cm)	6.8 (17)	7.1 (18)	4.5 (11)	0.6 (1.5)	0.0 (0.0)	0.0 (0.0)	0.0 (0.0)	0.0 (0.0)	0.0 (0.0)	0.0 (0.0)	0.1 (0.25)	3.6 (9.1)	11.8 (30)
Average precipitation days (≥ 0.01 in)	11.4	9.4	10.8	11.4	11.3	10.0	9.1	8.8	8.6	10.3	9.8	11.7	122.6
Average snowy days (≥ 0.1 in)	3.2	2.9	1.8	0.3	0.0	0.0	0.0	0.0	0.0	0.0	0.1	1.7	10.0
Source 1: NOAA
Source 2: National Weather Service

== Transportation ==
A small, quarter-mile stretch of Interstate 495 passes through the northeastern corner of town, just before its exit on Route 58, which terminates along the town line at Route 28. Along with those two roads, Route 105 travels through town, passing through the town center. The town can also be accessed via Exits 31 (North Street, Mattapoisett) and 35 (Route 105, Marion) along Interstate 195.

The nearest regional bus and air service can be found in New Bedford. The nearest national air service is at T. F. Green Airport in Rhode Island, and the nearest international airport is Logan International Airport in Boston. A freight rail line operated by the Massachusetts Coastal Railroad passes through the northeastern corner of town. The nearest inter-city (Amtrak) passenger rail station is in Providence; however, the terminus of the Middleborough-Lakeville line of the MBTA's commuter rail is nearby, providing direct service to Boston.

== Demographics ==
Historical population
Year	Pop.	±%
1790	2,644	—
1850	3,808	+44.0%
1860	1,232	−67.6%
1870	1,024	−16.9%
1880	1,043	+1.9%
1890	1,012	−3.0%
1900	986	−2.6%
1910	1,090	+10.5%
1920	1,047	−3.9%
1930	1,141	+9.0%
1940	1,269	+11.2%
1950	1,328	+4.6%
1960	1,559	+17.4%
1970	1,770	+13.5%
1980	3,205	+81.1%
1990	3,921	+22.3%
2000	4,581	+16.8%
2010	5,232	+14.2%
2020	5,717	+9.3%
2023*	5,871	+2.7%
* = population estimate. Source: United States census records and Population Estimates Program data.

As of the census of 2000, there were 4,581 people, 1,575 households, and 1,294 families residing in the town. The population density was 135.0 inhabitants per square mile (52.1/km^{2}). There were 1,634 housing units at an average density of 48.2 per square mile (18.6/km^{2}). The racial makeup of the town was 96.64% White, 0.63% African American, 0.20% Native American, 0.35% Asian, 1.16% from other races, and 1.03% from two or more races. Hispanic or Latino of any race were 0.37% of the population.

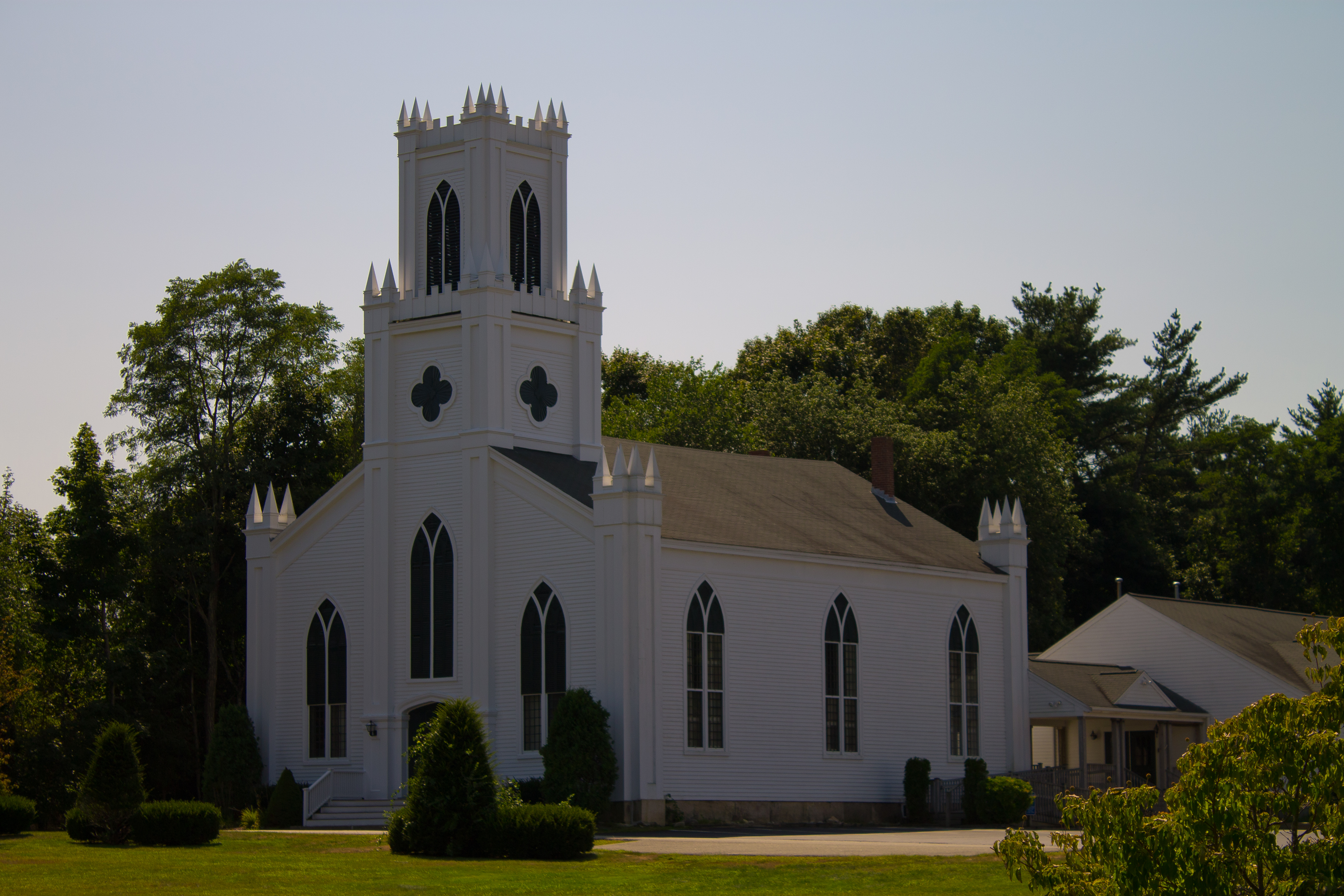
First Congregational Church, located near Town Hall

There were 1,575 households, out of which 38.9% had children under the age of 18 living with them, 72.6% were married couples living together, 6.5% had a female householder with no husband present, and 17.8% were non-families. 13.7% of all households were made up of individuals, and 5.7% had someone living alone who was 65 years of age or older. The average household size was 2.91 and the average family size was 3.20.

In the town, the population was spread out, with 26.8% under the age of 18, 6.5% from 18 to 24, 29.6% from 25 to 44, 28.8% from 45 to 64, and 8.3% who were 65 years of age or older. The median age was 38 years. For every 100 females, there were 100.6 males. For every 100 females age 18 and over, there were 96.7 males.

The median income for a household in the town was $63,289, and the median income for a family was $67,031. Males had a median income of $47,989 versus $31,196 for females. The per capita income for the town was $24,630. About 2.4% of families and 3.1% of the population were below the poverty line, including 4.4% of those under age 18 and 4.4% of those age 65 or over.

== Government ==
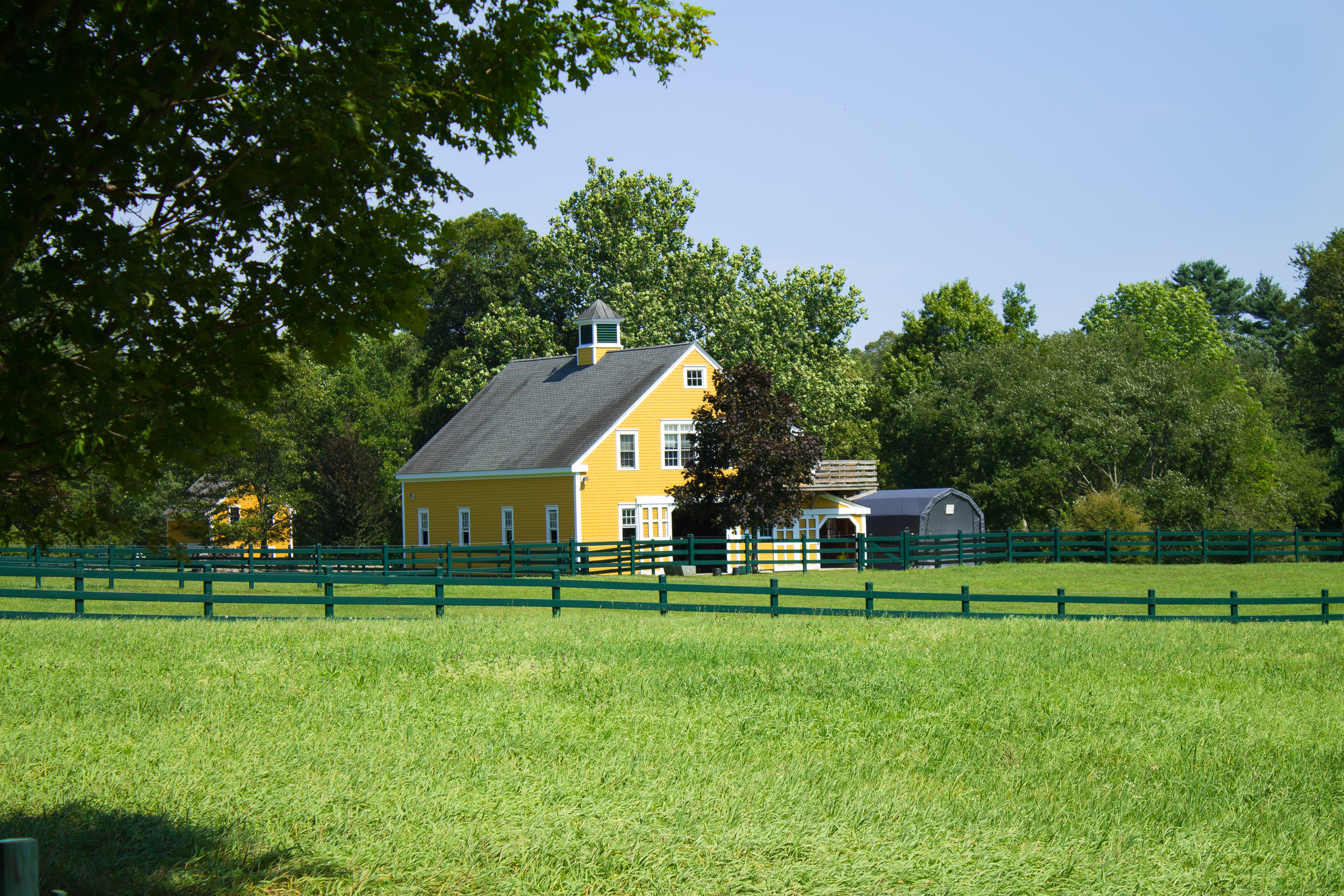
East Over Farms

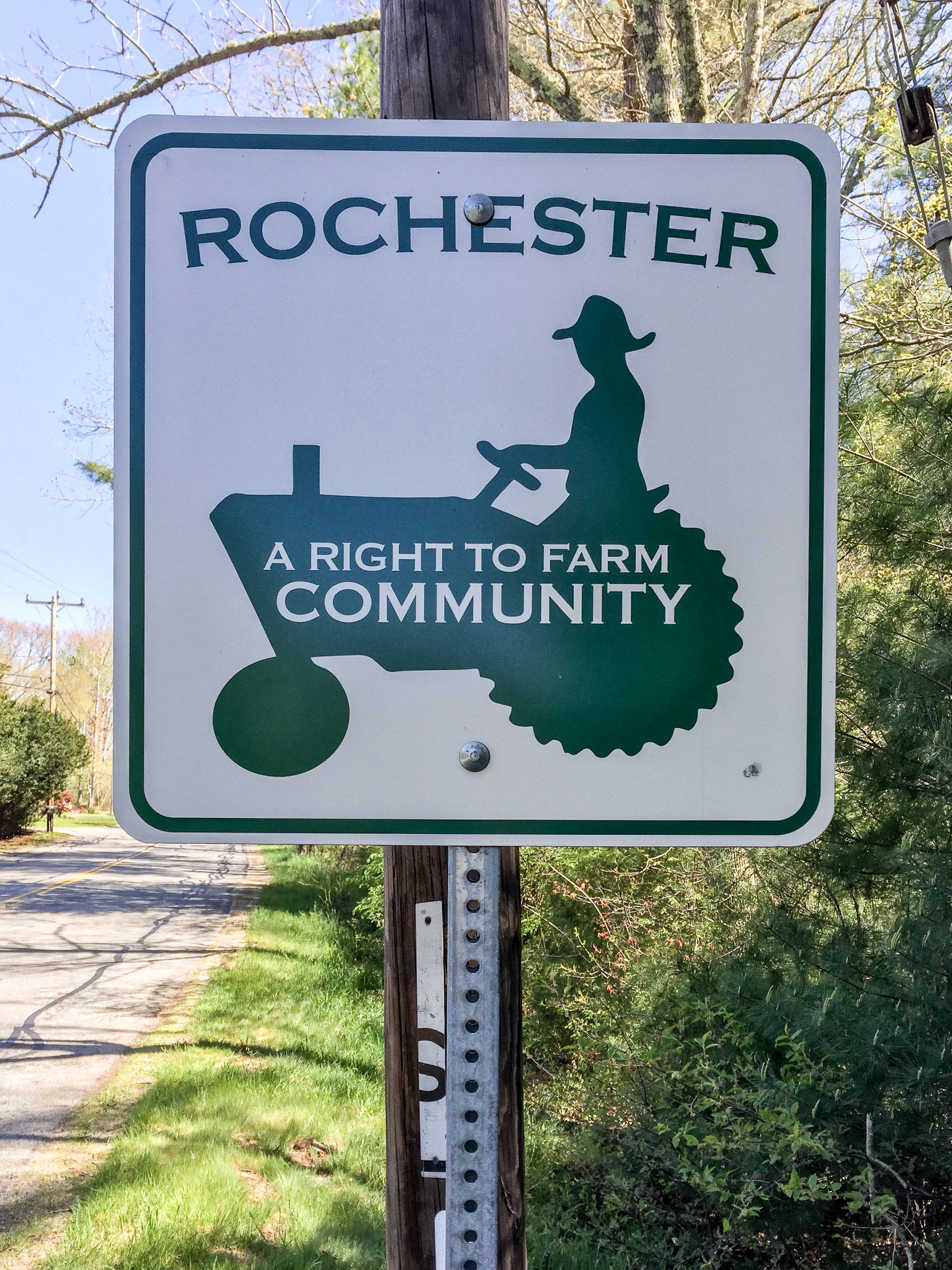
Rochester is a "Right to Farm" community

Rochester is represented by state Senator Michael Rodrigues (D-Westport) as a part of the First Bristol and Plymouth District of the Massachusetts Senate and by state Representative Mark Sylvia (D-Fairhaven) as a part of the Tenth Bristol District of the Massachusetts House of Representatives. The town is patrolled by the Rochester Police Department and is also in the service area of the Seventh (Bourne) Barracks of Troop D of the Massachusetts State Police.

On the national level, Rochester is a part of Massachusetts's 9th congressional district, and is currently represented by William R. Keating. The state's senior member of the United States Senate is Elizabeth Warren. The junior senator is Ed Markey.

The town uses the open town meeting form of government, led by a board of selectmen. The town hall is located at the Town Common along Route 105. The town's police department, post office and the Joseph H. Plumb Memorial Library (a part of the SAILS Library Network) are located nearby. The fire department is located closer to the geographic center of town. The town's Highway Department is located near Varella Corner, and is responsible for snow removal and road upkeep.

In 2012, the town adopted a "Right-to-Farm" bylaw which "encourages the pursuit of agriculture, promotes agriculture-based economic opportunities, and protects farmlands within the Town of Rochester by allowing agricultural uses and related activities".

Like most of the South Coast region, Rochester is rather conservative. Donald Trump won 56% of the vote in Rochester in the 2024. John Kerry is, to date, the last Democrat to win the town in a presidential election.

== Education ==
Rochester is a member of the 2,700-student Old Rochester Regional School District. The town, along with Marion and Mattapoisett, operate as a single school system with each town having its own school subcommittee. The town operates Rochester Memorial School for kindergarten through sixth-grade students. Seventh- and eighth-grade students attend Old Rochester Regional Junior High School, and high school students attend Old Rochester Regional High School. Both regional schools are located on Route 6 in Mattapoisett, just over the Marion town line. The high school, affectionately known as "O.R.R.," competes in the South Coast Conference for athletics. Their mascot is the bulldog, and their colors are red and white. The town's Thanksgiving Day football rival is Apponequet Regional High School, in Lakeville.

In addition to public schools, high school students may also choose to attend Old Colony Regional Vocational Technical High School, located in North Rochester. Their mascot is the Cougar, and they compete in the Pilgrim Conference for athletics. The curriculum includes shops such as welding, cosmetics, auto, wood work, and many more. The nearest private school is Tabor Academy in Marion.

== Notable people ==
- Joseph Bates, founder of the Seventh-Day Adventist Church, born in Rochester
- Tristam Burges (1770–1853), U.S. Congressman and professor at Brown University, born in Rochester
- Selene Gifford (1901–1979), Assistant Commissioner, Bureau of Indian Affairs
- David Wing Jr., Secretary of State of Vermont

== See also ==
- Rochester, England
