= Camp Avoda =

Jewish boys' camp in Massachusetts

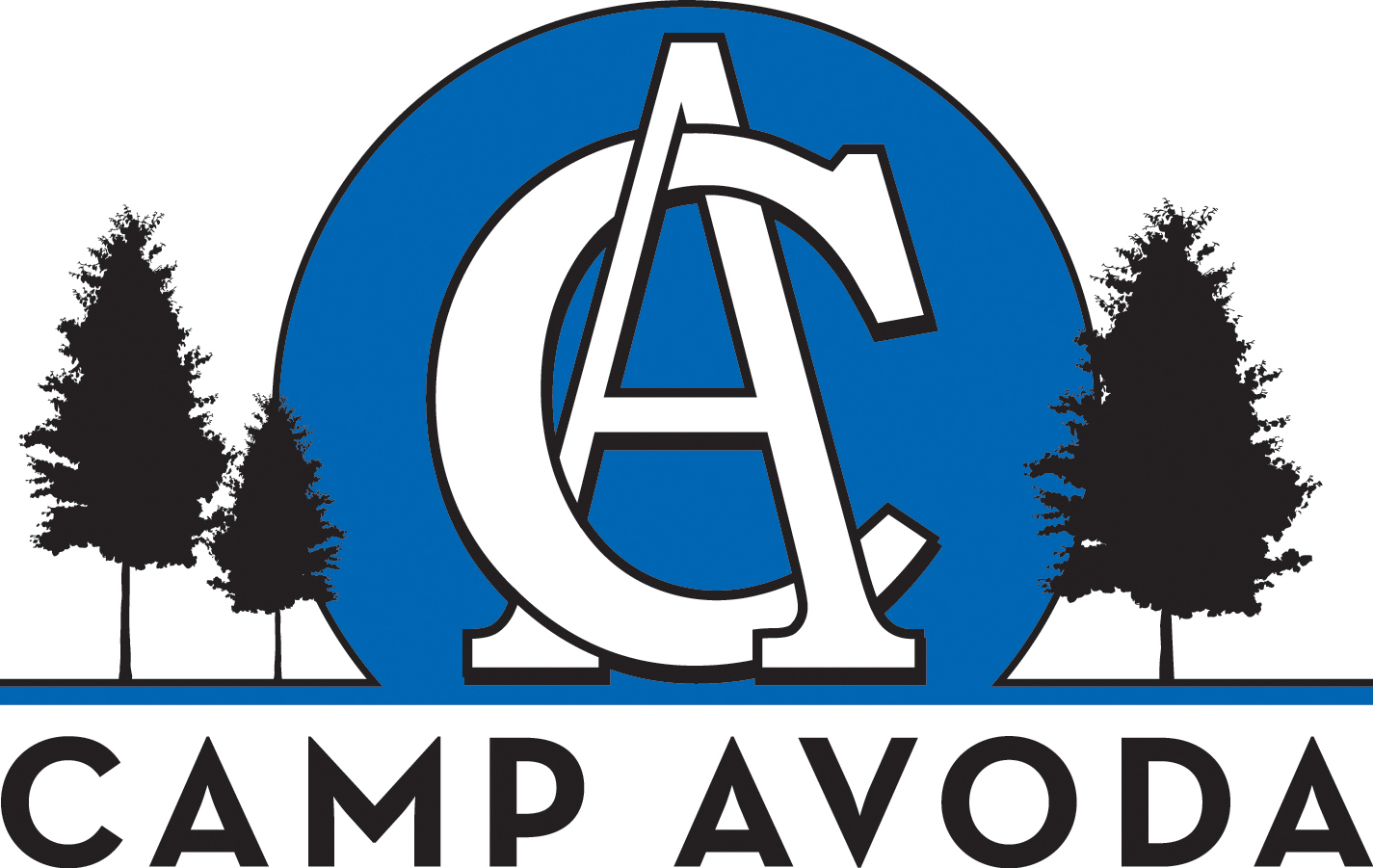
- Interactive map of Camp Avoda
- Established: 1927; 99 years ago
- Website: campavoda.org

Camp Avoda (Note: See "Avodah" article for the meaning of the word.) is a Jewish boys' overnight camp located on Tispaquin Pond in Middleboro, Massachusetts. It has been in continuous operation since the summer of 1927, making it the oldest Jewish boys' camp in New England.

== History ==
Camp Avoda was established in early 1927 by the Young Men's Hebrew Association to serve the needs of underprivileged Jewish boys. Originally, the bunks were essentially "huts" and had no screening or walls. Today, campers sleep in basic cabins which were built at various times between the late 1950s and early 1980s. Many bunks were expanded after a rise in attendance in the mid-1990s.

== Organization ==
The camp is a non-profit entity operated by a Board of Directors and duly incorporated as Camp Avoda, Inc. It serves the needs of 125-150 campers per session.

Camp Avoda is located on a 60-acre (240,000 m^{2}) tract of land on Tispaquin Pond in Middleborough, Massachusetts. More than half of that land is wooded area, which is used for hiking, camping, mountain-biking, and a high-elements ropes course which was constructed in 1999.

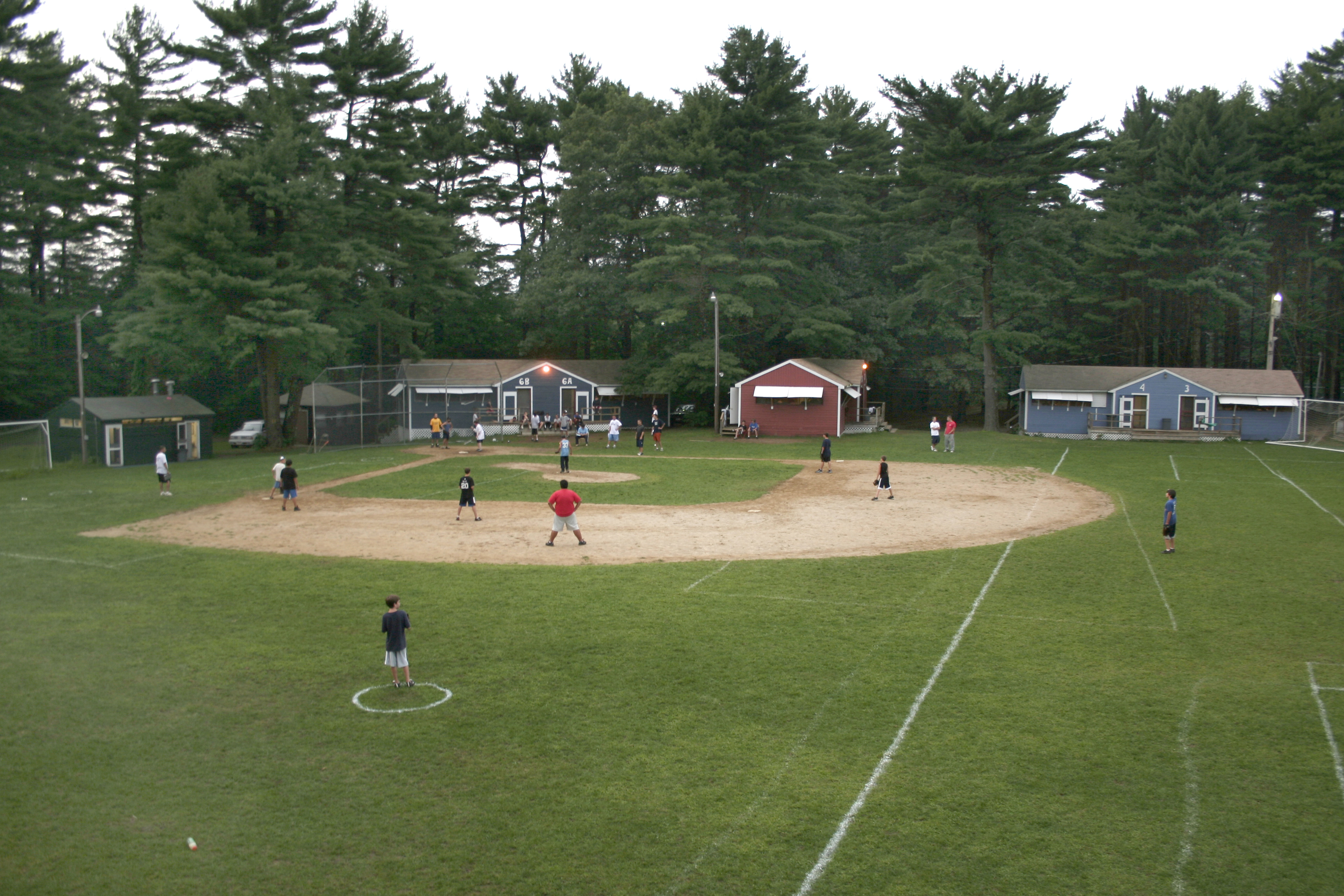
View of Camp Avoda's field

The camp's buildings, including eight cabins, the recreation hall, the C.I.T. "bungalow", the shower houses, two administrator cabins, and the "OD shack", surround the large ball field, where all field sports are played.

Ken Shifman is currently the executive director of the camp. Shifman began as director in 2008 and became executive director in 2015 after Paul G. Davis retired. Davis had been employed since 1966, making him one of the longest-serving camp directors in the United States.

Camp Avoda currently has a 7 1/2-week season, which includes a 4-week-long first session and a 3 1/2-week second session. Each summer there are 32–40 junior and senior counselors ranging between ages 17–24. Almost all counselors were once campers at Camp Avoda, and most are typically college students.

Most campers reside in New England, with the vast majority concentrated in the Greater Boston area. However, some campers travel from Florida, the Washington, D.C. area, New Jersey, California, and Israel, to spend their summers at Camp Avoda.

In 2002, Camp Avoda celebrated its 75th anniversary, with over 1,000 Avodians attending festivities.

== Traditions ==
Nearly all counselors were once Avoda campers and successful graduates of the Avoda Counselor-in-Training (C.I.T.) program.

=== 4th of July Celebration ===
July 4 is the first pinnacle event of the summer. The camp hosts its own carnival during the day, where each bunk creates its own booth in addition to those rented by the camp. At night is the annual Bonfire and Chip Ceremony. The bonfire is built entirely by Bunk 14, who name the bonfire and place a sign at the top with the name. The bonfire can be as tall as 16 feet (4.9 m). Once the fire has started to die down, a member from each bunk stands in front of the fire and makes a speech about their camp experience. After they make their speech, they take a wood chip, and throw it into the fire. Bunk 14 is the last bunk to speak, and has three speakers. After the campers finish, staff members and administrators, and finally the director, make speeches.

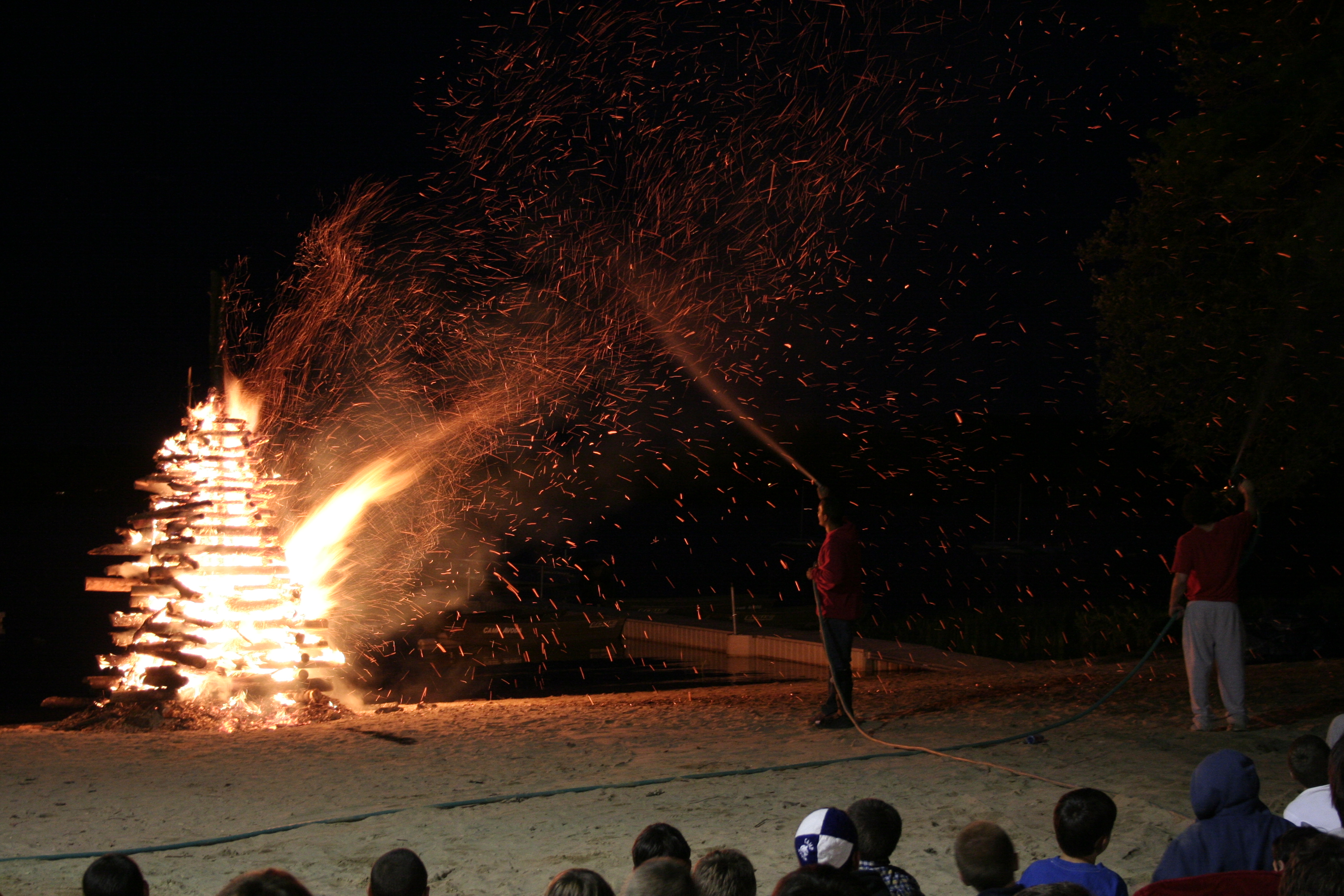
The bonfire during the 4th of July celebration

=== Trips ===
Trips occur every Thursday, except during Color War. Destinations have included Six Flags New England, Red Sox games, and Water Country. In addition, there are choice trips, in which campers are given between 3 and 4 options of destination. Trips designated for specific groups of campers include the annual fishing trip (Freshman, Sophomore, and Juniors), the Bunk 14 overnight, and the Senior Canoe Trip.

=== Tournaments ===
Avoda competes in tournaments with rival camps such as Camp Bauercrest, Bournedale, Young Judaea, Tel Noar, and Tevya. Avoda also attends the Bauercrest and YJ tournaments, and hosts its own annual tournament including soccer, softball and basketball.

=== Bunk 14 ===
Bunk 14, also known as "The Betty Grable Commandos" is the bunk of the oldest campers at Avoda. Typically it houses 15-year-olds entering the 10th grade, however following the cancellation of the 2020 summer due to the Covid-19 pandemic, 16 year-olds entering the 11th grade are currently Bunk 14ers. With Bunk 14 comes special privileges and automatic "alumni" status. Many alumni are often identified and identify themselves by their Bunk 14 Year.

== Color War ==
Color War occurs during the last week of the summer. The camp is split up into two teams, "White" and "Blue", with each team including eight staff members. Each camper is placed in a division with other campers of their own age and one year above or below them. The four divisions are Freshman, Sophomore, Junior, and Senior. In each division, the two teams face each other in sports, side events, tug of wars, and other events. The point values for each event are hidden from the campers, but increase in value from the Freshman to Senior Division.

One of the traditions of Color War is the silent meals. If campers are caught talking during any of the 18 meals (6 days, 3 meals a day), points are deducted from their team.

The winner is usually announced through a fixed race or game of some sort, in which the counselors representing the winning team win. The winning team then jumps in the lake.

=== Color War Record ===
Year	Winning team	Losing team
1972	White Patriots General Carl Rottersman; Captain Jon Bamel, Arthur Mendelsohn	Blue Braves General Steven Woolf; Captain George Brockman
1973	White Cougars General Bobby Gilberg; Captain Neil Sandler	Blue Brigade General Danny Bauman; Captain Steven Bender
1974	Blue Israelites General Robbie Coppel; Captain Phil Lukoff	White Cobras General Brad Barry; Captain Gary Epstein
1975	White Wizards General Robbie Coppel; Captain Jerry Gordon	Blue Tide General Mike Katz; Captain David Bamel
1976	Blue Rockets General George Brockman; Captain Robbie Satloff	White Eagles General Robbie Coppel; Captain Bruce Bender
1977	Blue Destroyers General Stuart Bram; Captain Ken Sandberg	White Kings General David Goodman; Captain Mike Ross
1978	White Cosmos General Eric Yaffe; Captain Glen French	Blue Diamonds General Phil Lukoff; Captain Gary Greenstein
1979	White Warriors General David Bamel; Captain Neil Schneider	Blue Cyclones General Mitch Rubin; Captain David Snider
1980	White Avodians General Paul Kleinmann; Captain Richie Mintzer	Blue Aztecs General Robert Satloff; Captain Evan Yampolsky
1981	White Sabres General Steve Aronson; Captain Bruce French	Blue Galaxy General Steve Camiel; Captain Paul Simon
1982	Blue Sting General Mike Roth; Captain Alex Sherman	White Warlords General Steve Aronson; Captain Mike Saperstein
1983	White Falcons General David Snider; Captain Richard I Lefkowitz	Blue Dragons General Mike Rutstein; Captain Jon Lee
1984	Blue Express General Evan Yampolsky; Captain Lee Kaiser	White Magic General Andy Stone; Captain Larry Gold
1985	Blue Demons General Paul Simon; Captain Jon Feldman	White Spray General Mark Solomon; Captain Danny Gold
1986	White Spartans General Peter Spider Lebowitz; Captain Josh Camire	Blue Crusade General David Wertheim; Captain Brett Smith
1987	White Cougars General David Wertheim; Captain Jimmy Sklaver	Blue Pythons General Gary Solomon; Captain Stu Glasser
1988	Blue Shadow General Jay Yampolsky; Captain Adam Kaufman	White Lightning General Russell Katz; Captain Jon Cohen
1989	Blue Storm General Mark Glovin; Captain Ariel Waldman	White Raiders General Ken Shifman; Captain Brian Malamut
1990	White Panthers General Ken Shifman; Captain Jake Farquharson	Blue Stampede General Russell Katz; Captain Bobby Zuker
1991	Blue Scorpions General Jeff Blocker; Captain Aaron Katz	White Knights General Andy Spear; Captain Josh Kaswell
1992	White Empire General Stu Glass; Captain Spencer Kimball	Blue Assault General David Wilcov; Captain Darryl Malamut
1993	Blue Sharks General Jeremy Agulnek; Captain Jason Kurtz	White Heat General Ricky Hyman; Captain Jeremy Steckel
1994	Blue Predators General Jeremy Agulnek; Captain Dan Gold_Pitegoff	White Seminoles General Ricky Hyman; Captain Scott Bookman
1995	Blue Devils General Jeff Vetstein; Captain Sam Chates	White Wolves General Bobby Zuker; Captain Adam Hatch
1996	Blue Grizzlies General Jeremy Agulnek; Captain Josh Schneider	White Wildcats General Mark Sokoloff; Captain Jesse Fanuiel
1997	Blue Justice General Jeff Vetstein; Captain Greg Lazaroff	White Bulldogs General Ken Freeman; Captain Jon Ostroff
1998	White Vipers General Spencer Kimball; Captain Josh Damm	Blue Rebels General Aaron Agulnek; Captain Dave Pratter
1999	White Force General Eric Levy; Captain Matt Aschaffenburg	Blue Tide General EJ Kimball; Captain Matthew Chella
2000	Blue Dynasty General Spencer Kimball; Captain Sam Glick	White Warriors General Dave Brown; Captain Dave Kivowitz
2001	White Lions General Barry Morgan; Captain Josh Coran	Blue Terror General Adam Miller; Captain Sawyer Emmer
2002	Blue Gladiators General EJ Kimball; Captain Steve Mendelsohn	White Patriots General Josh Schneider; Captain Brian Norcross
2003	Blue Giants General Adam Miller; Captain Matt Glick	White Titans General Greg Lazaroff; Captain Jared Shalek
2004	Blue Buccaneers General Adam Miller; Captain Benny Bershad	White Outlaws General Evan Traiger; Captain Jonathan Katz
2005	Blue Mafia General Todd Miller; Captain Justin Lukoff	White Tigers General Mike Pemstein; Captain Cory Schneider
2006	Blue Venom General Sawyer Emmer; Captain Eli Rodrigues	White Dragons General Mike Pemstein; Captain Sam Brenner
2007	Blue Animals General Dan Gollinger; Captain Eddie Bernson	White Spartans General Erik Silevitch; Captain Sascha Bercovitch
2008	White Phantoms General Matt Norcross; Captain Jason Hefter	Blue Army General David Fine; Captain Brendan Hefter
2009	Blue Monsters General Adam Rubin; Captain Paul Sockol	White Mustangs General Jonny Singer; Captain Brandon Banker
2010	White Assassins General Cory Finkelman; Captain Marc Gleason	Blue Heroes General Ethan Gurwitz; Captain Sam Watman
2011	Blue Barbarians General Richard Katz; Captain Harrison Bamel	White Legends General Josh Coran; Captain Jake Alexander
2012	White Mercenaries General Ben Rubin; Captain Drew Lukoff	Blue Gators General Eddie Bernson; Captain Benji Satloff
2013	Blue Goblins General Jason Hefter; Captain Ben Shale	White Prophets General Jacob Dennis; Captain Louis Yarmolinsky
2014	Blue Vikings General Joey Sherman; Captain Abe Watman	White Chiefs General Jacob Dennis; Captain Dan Chafetz
2015	White Olympians General Sam Watman; Captain Eli Sabin	Blue Apes General Louis Douglas; Captain Max Waltzman
2016	White Villains General Jared Fixler; Captain Ross Halpern	Blue Bears General Louis Douglas; Captain Zac Roth
2017	Blue Wizards General Joshua Cohen; Captain Sam Waltzman	White Royals General Drew Lukoff; Captain Nate Goldberg
2018	Navy Seals General Abe Watman; Captain Adam Alter	White Avengers General Wes Fixler; Captain Sawyer Busny
2019	Blue Anarchy General Shay Wenglin; Captain Charlie Zuker	White Jaguars General Ty Goldstein; Captain Michael Shnidman Jr.
2021	White Avalanche General Jay Blumenfeld; Captain Jason Karas	Blue Conquerors General Max Waltzman; Captain Cole Busny
2022	Blue Demons General Nate Goldberg; Captain Matt Brayer	White Armada General Ethan Shifman; Captain Jacob Demeo
2023	White Huskies General Owen Sherman; Captain Ryan Jacoby	Blue Bandits General Max Kleinmann; Captain Jonah Bramson
2024	Blue Revolution General Charlie Zuker; Captain Zack Leibman	White Flames General Alex Shifman; Captain Danny Karas
2025	White Mavericks General Jason Karas; Captain Micah Gladstone	Blue Wolverines General Charlie Zuker; Captain Jake Paltrowitz
2026	White Pirates General Griffin Bloomstein; Captain Hillel Goldberg	Blue Titans General Jason Karas; Captain JD Feldman

== Alumni Association ==
Since 1987, the Camp Avoda Alumni Association has hosted a full weekend dedicated to Alumni events, which typically takes place the weekend before the campers arrive at camp. t is common for Alumni members to stop by throughout the summer to interact with the current staff and campers.

In addition to the Alumni Weekend, the Avoda Alumni Association hosts events throughout the off-season at various Massachusetts locations, including: Billiard Nights, Family Day at Gillette Stadium, and the annual Thanksgiving Football Game. The Alumni Association also hosts fundraising and charitable endeavors aimed at providing scholarships to campers for the summers.
