= Mary's Pond =

Lake of the United States

Mary’s Pond
- Location within Massachusetts
- Location: Rochester, Massachusetts
- Coordinates: 41°45′20″N 70°47′30″W
- Type: Kettle pond, sometimes called a "Morning Glory Pond" because of its circular shape. It has no inflow or outflow and is dependent on groundwater and rainfall.
- Primary inflows: none
- Primary outflows: none
- Basin countries: United States
- Surface area: 81 acres (33 ha)
- Average depth: 12 ft (3.7 m)
- Max. depth: 32 ft (9.8 m)

Mary's Pond, also known as Marys Pond, is an 81-acre (330,000 m^{2}) kettle pond in Rochester, Massachusetts, United States. The pond is located east of Leonards Pond. The average depth is 12 feet (3.7 m), and the maximum depth is 32 feet (9.8 m). Rochester's town beach is located on the northwestern shore of the pond along Mary's Pond Road.

In 2011, amid plans to create a recreation area on the popular beach, a title search revealed that the beach was privately owned. Although the town of Rochester maintains Mary's Pond Road through an easement, and although the State of Massachusetts maintains the pond itself, the beach is now closed to the public.
