= Wampanoag Royal Cemetery =

Historic cemetery in Massachusetts, United States

- U.S. National Register of Historic Places
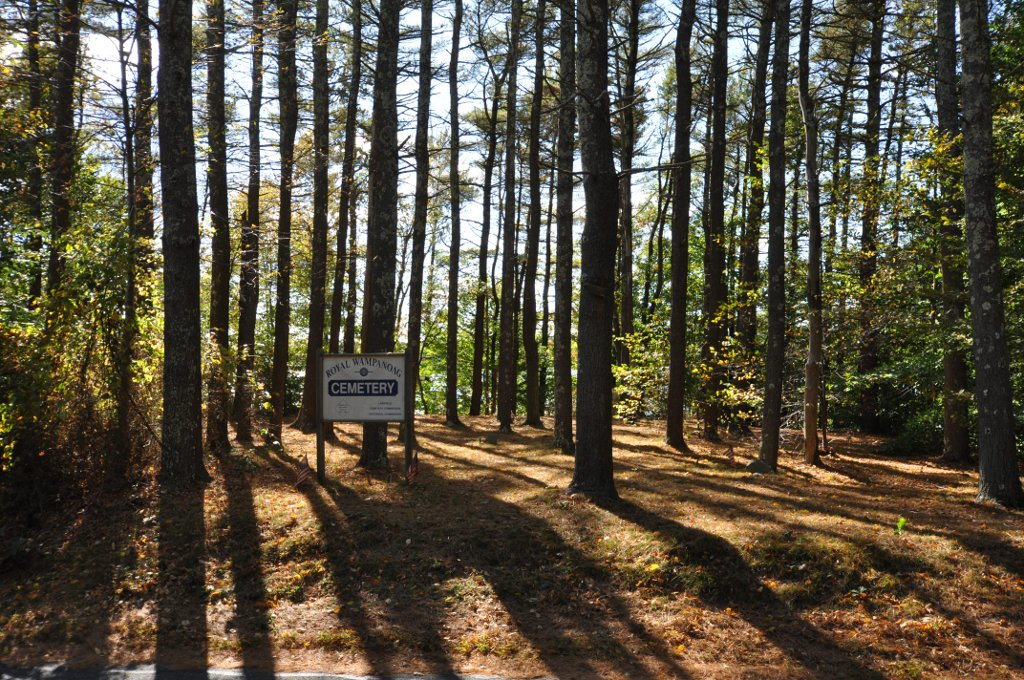

- Location within Massachusetts Location within the United States
- Nearest city: Lakeville, Massachusetts
- Built: 1676
- NRHP reference No.: 75001625
- Added to NRHP: November 11, 1975

Wampanoag Royal Cemetery is a historic Native American cemetery in Lakeville, Massachusetts. There are approximately 20 graves in the cemetery, all of Native Americans. The burials include direct descendants of the Wampanoag sachem Massasoit. His daughter Amie, his only child to survive King Philip's War, and her descendants lived nearby in the Betty's Neck area. The last known burial was thought to be that of Lydia Tuspaquin, a drowning victim, in 1812.

The burying grounds are maintained by the town of Lakeville and the Assawompsett-Nemasket Band of Wampanoags; The local indigenous tribe whose ancestors are buried on the property.

The cemetery was listed on the National Register of Historic Places in 1975.

== See also ==
- National Register of Historic Places listings in Plymouth County, Massachusetts
