= Pocksha Pond =

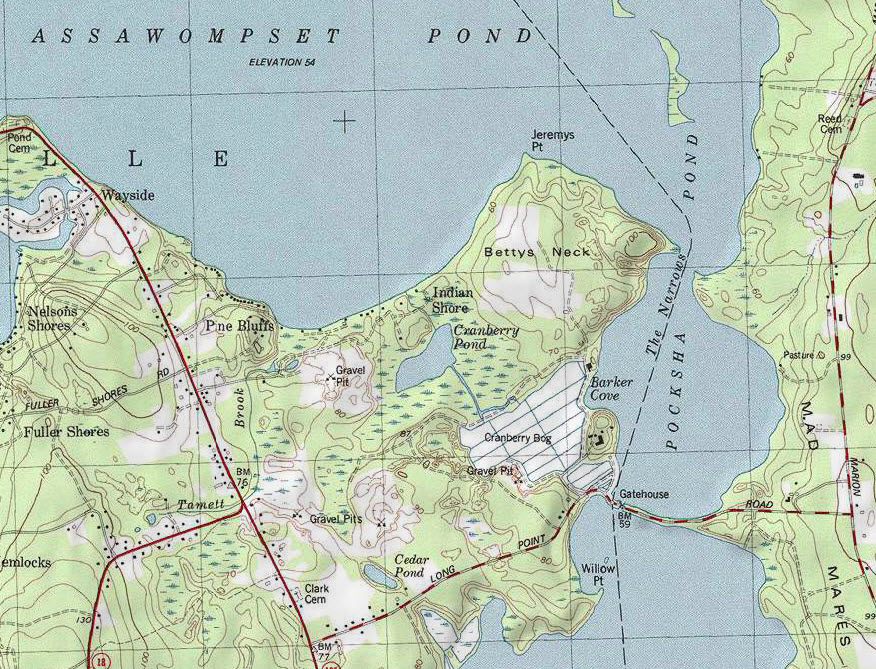
- Map of Pocksha Pond

- Location within Massachusetts Location within the United States
- Location: Lakeville and Middleboro, Massachusetts
- Coordinates: 41°49′40″N 70°53′40″W
- Type: reservoir
- Basin countries: United States
- Surface area: 230 acres (93 ha)

Pocksha Pond is a lake/reservoir/pond within the towns of Lakeville and Middleboro, in southeastern Massachusetts. It shares its waters with Great Quittacas Pond and openly connected with Assawompset Pond. These lakes provides a source of drinking water to the city of New Bedford, the largest city in southeastern Massachusetts.

== Wildlife ==
There have been bald eagle nests around the lake, and there have been beaver and otter sightings. In June 2011, an American black bear was seen swimming across the lake.
