= Long Pond (Hancock County, Maine) =

- Great Pond
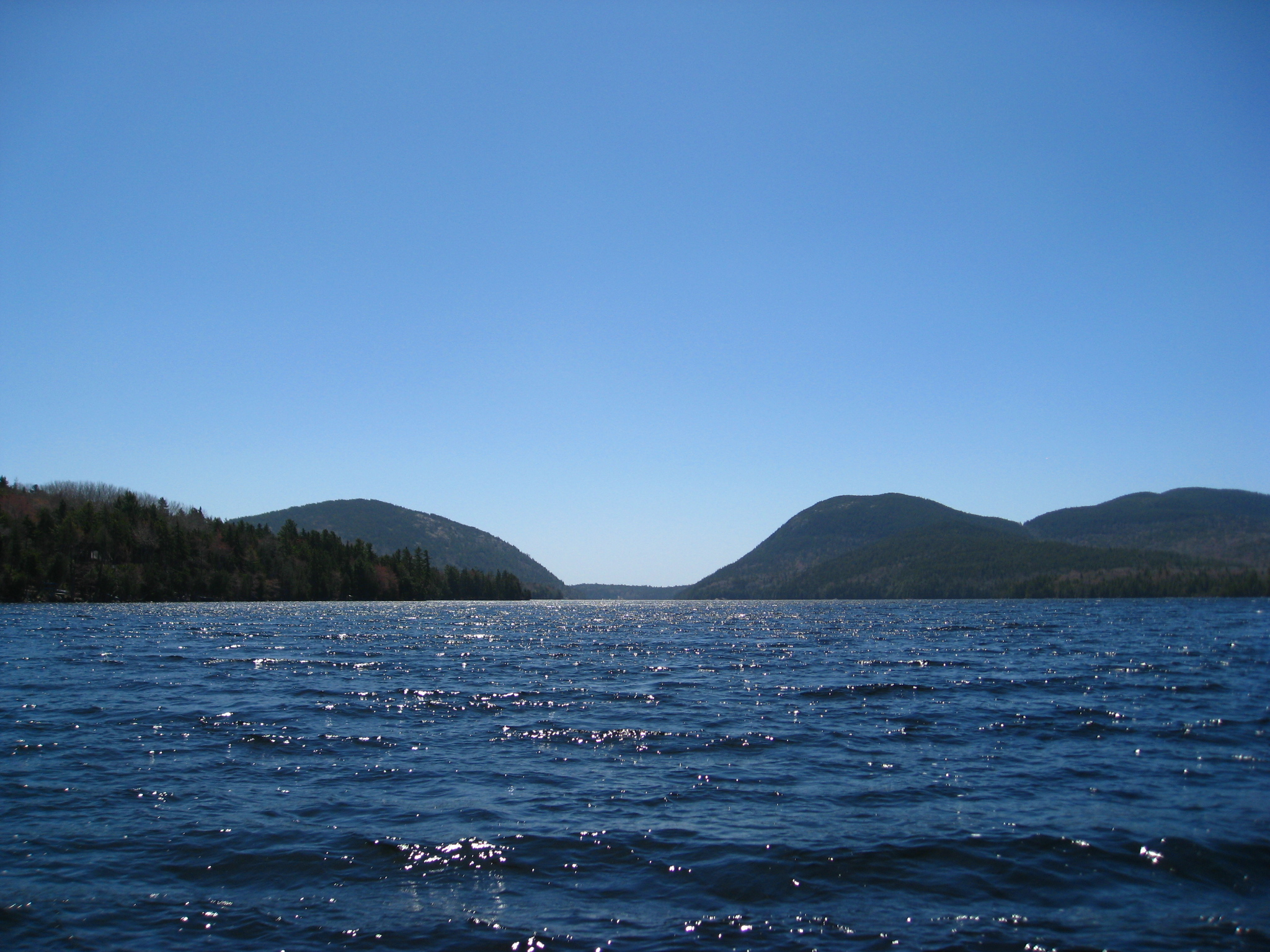
- View looking South

- Location within Maine Location within the United States
- Location: Mount Desert and Southwest Harbor, Maine
- Coordinates: 44°19′25″N 68°21′30″W
- Type: Glacial lake
- Surface area: 897 acres (363 ha)
- Average depth: 37 ft (11 m)
- Max. depth: 113 ft (34 m)
- Surface elevation: 58 ft (18 m)
- Islands: 1

Long Pond, also known as Great Pond, is a nearly 4-mile (6.4 km)-long glacial lake located on Mount Desert Island in Hancock County, Maine, United States.
