= Great Quittacas Pond =

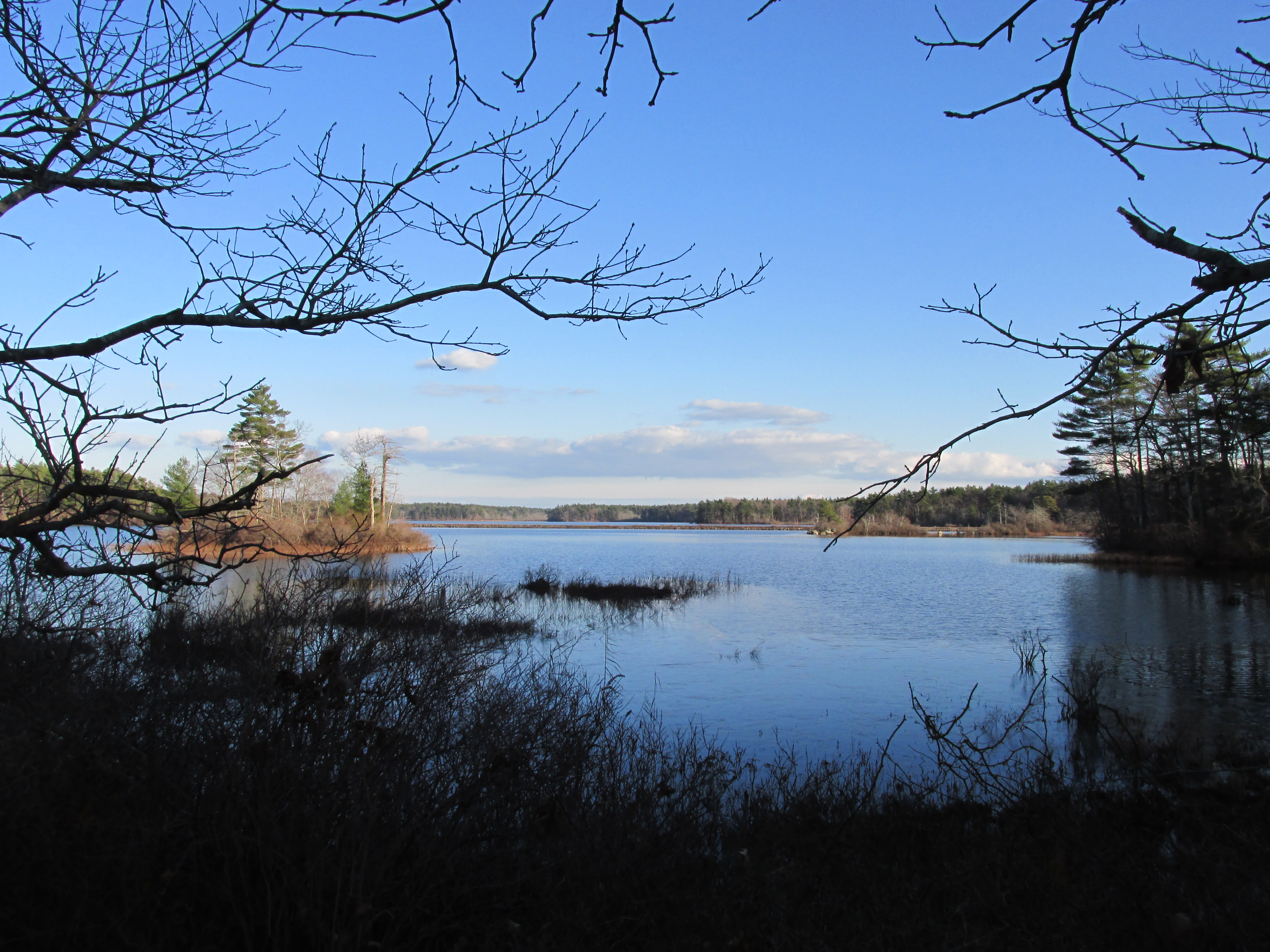

- Location within Massachusetts Location within the United States
- Location: Lakeville, Middleboro, and Rochester, Massachusetts
- Coordinates: 41°48′10″N 70°53′55″W
- Type: reservoir
- Basin countries: United States
- Surface area: 1,185 acres (480 ha)
- Surface elevation: 52 ft (16 m)
- Islands: 3 (Great Island, Little Island, Anuxanon Island)

Great Quittacas Pond is a lake, reservoir, or pond within the towns of Lakeville, Middleboro, and Rochester, in southeastern Massachusetts, United States. It shares its waters with Pocksha Pond and possibly nearby Little Quittacas Pond. These lakes provide a source of drinking water to the city of New Bedford, the largest city in southeastern Massachusetts.
