= Mattapoisett River =

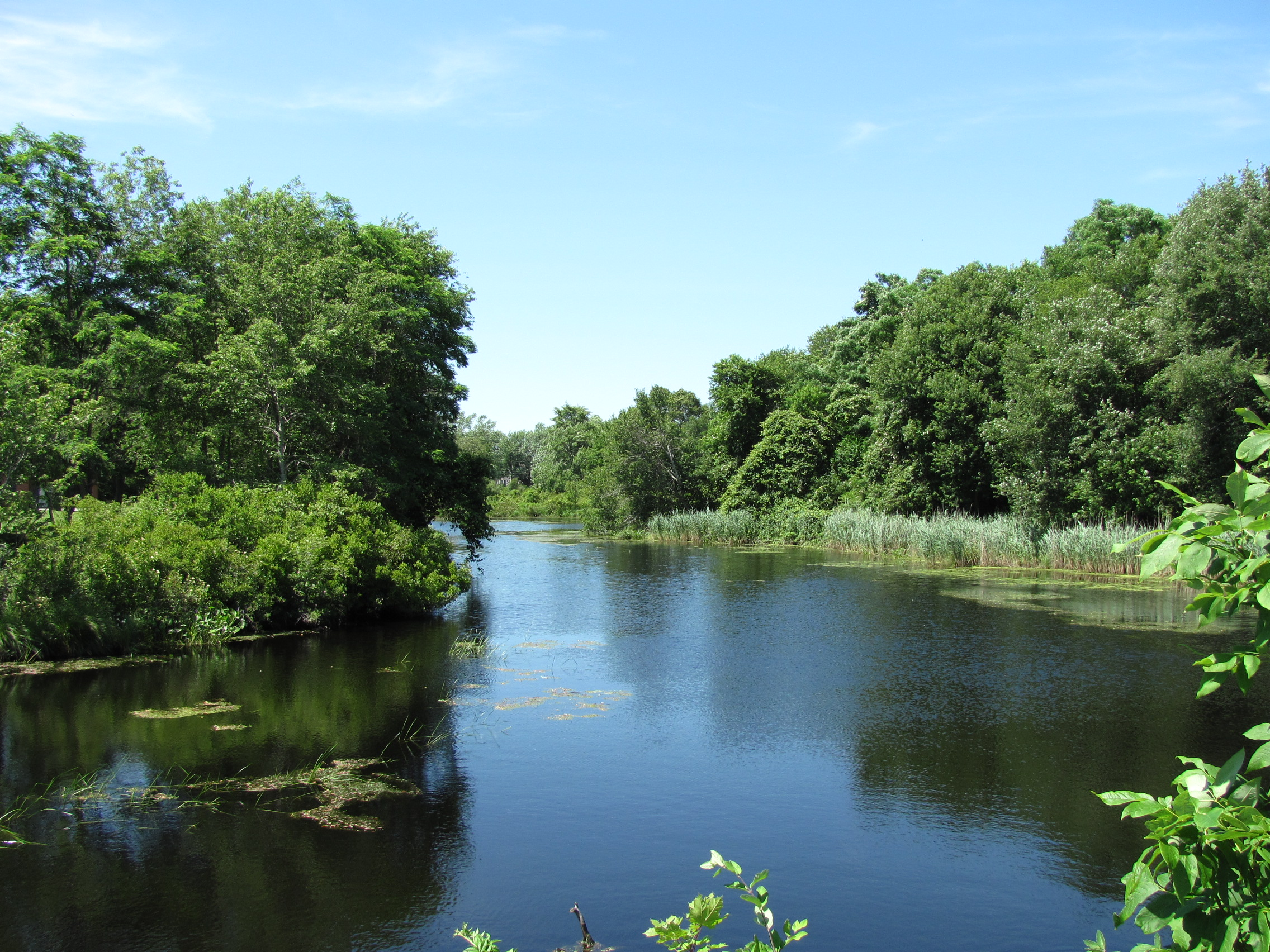
- The view of the river at US Route 6 in Mattapoisett.

Location
- Country: United States
- State: Massachusetts
- Cities: Mattapoisett, Rochester

Physical characteristics
- Mouth: Snipatuit Pond

The Mattapoisett River is an 11.6-mile-long (18.7 km) river in southeastern Massachusetts, in the United States.

The river begins at Snipatuit Pond in Rochester and flows generally southwards through Mattapoisett to empty into Mattapoisett Harbor, an arm of Buzzards Bay. It flows through wetlands during much of its course.

Historically, the Mattapoisett River has yielded the bay's most abundant herring populations. For example, town reports for 1906 recorded that the river's total catch was 626,000 alewives, and a further 465,000 alewives were noted in the 1907 report. In the referenced 1920s report the river served for "flooding cranberry bogs and for mill purposes" and featured three herring weirs; the "Upper Herring Weir" in Rochester, the "Middle Weir" or "Church's Weir", and the "Lower Herring Weir" at the entrance to Mattapoisett Harbor.

Fish populations drastically declined during the twentieth century until they were almost extinguished, but local restoration efforts from the 1980s onwards have fostered a slow recovery. The principal restoration tactic has been to remove snags and other obstacles from the river that serve to impede fish migrations. The Lower Herring Weir is one of the few rivers emptying into Buzzards Bay that has electronic fish counters installed. Reports from Alewives Anonymous documented in the more recent Buzzards Bay National Estuary Program report show that the improvements peaked in 2000 with over 130,000, but dropped off again and have been below 20,000 since 2003.

Older residents refer to the Mattapoisett River as "the Herring Run", and a highway sign where the river flows under US Route 6 once identified the river by this unofficial name.

Since 1934, the river has been the venue for the Annual Rochester to Mattapoisett Memorial Day Boat Race.
