= USS Wampanoag (ATA-202) =

United States Navy auxiliary ocean-going tug (1945-47)

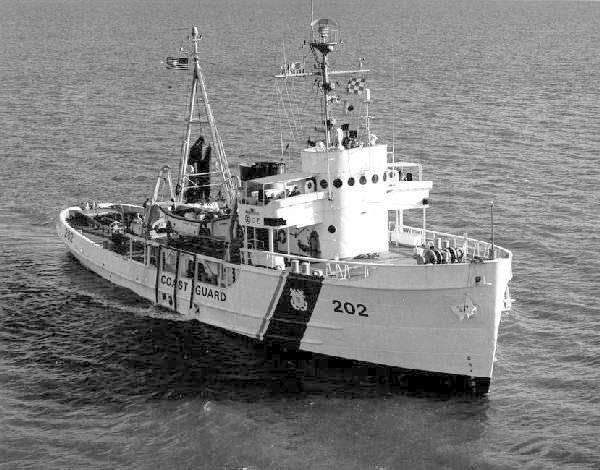

History

United States
- Name: USS Wampanoag
- Namesake: The Wampanoag, a Native American tribe that lives in Massachusetts and Rhode Island
- Builder: Gulfport Boiler and Welding Works, Port Arthur, Texas
- Laid down: 24 August 1944
- Launched: 10 October 1944
- Commissioned: 8 December 1944
- Decommissioned: 27 February 1947
- Renamed: USS Wampanoag 16 July 1948 (previously the USS ATA-202)
- Stricken: 1 June 1969
- Identification: IMO number: 8991786; MMSI number: 366998910; Callsign: WDH8267
- Honors and awards: One battle star for World War II service
- Status: Operational museum ship
- Notes: Call sign: NILA

General characteristics
- Class & type: ATA-170-class tug
- Displacement: 610 tons (light); 860 tons (full load)
- Length: 143 ft 0 in (43.59 m)
- Beam: 33 ft 10 in (10.31 m)
- Draft: 13 ft 2 in (4.01 m)
- Speed: 13 knots
- Complement: 45
- Armament: 1 × 3 in (76 mm) gun; 2 × twin 40 mm Anti-aircraft warfare guns

The second USS Wampanoag (ATA-202), originally USS ATA-202, is a United States Navy auxiliary ocean-going tug in commission from 1945 to 1947.

USS ATA-202 was laid down on 24 August 1944 at Port Arthur, Texas, by the Gulfport Boiler and Welding Works. She was launched on 10 October 1944 and commissioned on 8 December 1944.

ATA-202 completed her shakedown and training during the latter half of December 1944 and proceeded via the Panama Canal to the Pacific Ocean. On 12 January 1945, she reported for World War II duty with the United States Pacific Fleet and, by late April 1945 had joined Service Squadron (ServRon) 10 at Ulithi Atoll in support of the Okinawa campaign. Late in May 1945, she moved to Okinawa for a brief tour of duty, then returned to her base at Ulithi Atoll in mid-June 1945. It is reasonable to assume that her round-trip voyage to Okinawa was for the purpose of towing battle-damaged ships back to Ulithi Atoll for repair.

ATA-202 continued her duty with ServRon 10 through the end of the war, in which hostilities with Japan ceased on 15 August 1945. She was awarded one battle star for her service during World War II.

ATA-202 returned to the United States in September 1945, and began nine months of duty in the 11th Naval District at San Diego, California. She was reassigned to the Atlantic Reserve Fleet's Texas Group at Orange, Texas, in March 1946 and reported there in July 1946. On 27 February 1947, she was decommissioned there and berthed with the Texas Group, Atlantic Reserve Fleet. While in reserve, she was renamed USS Wampanoag on 16 July 1948.

Wampanoag remained in reserve until 25 February 1959 at which time she was loaned to the United States Coast Guard. In the Coast Guard, she became the USCGC Comanche (WATA-202), later redesignated WMEC-202 as a medium endurance cutter. On 1 June 1969, her name was struck from the Navy Directory and she was transferred permanently to the Coast Guard.

Comanche operated along the United States West Coast from 1959 to 1967. She moved her home port to Corpus Christi, Texas in 1967, then moved it again to Eureka, California, in 1969. She operated from Eureka until decommissioned by the Coast Guard on 30 January 1980 and laid up. She was sold into commercial service in 1991, and operated commercially in the Puget Sound area of Washington until laid up in 2000.

In 2007, the Comanche was given to the Comanche 202 Foundation, a non-profit founded on 11 September 2007, for the purpose of preserving, restoring and operating the last complete ATA and the first U.S. Coast Guard Medium Endurance Cutter preserved on the west coast. As of 2015, she has been moored at the Tyee Marina, Tacoma, Washington, during the winter months and also at the Bremerton Marina, Bremerton, WA and visits other Puget Sounds port. Comanche is frequently open for tours. Comanche is fully operational and makes cruises on the Puget Sound.

In October 2021 the command of the vessel was assumed by the ATA 202 Foundation, a non profit, to continue the ship's restoration and increase public access.
