= Snipatuit Pond =

Lake of the United States of America

- Location within Massachusetts
- Location: Rochester, Massachusetts
- Coordinates: 41°46′36″N 70°51′48″W
- Primary inflows: Cedar Swamp, Great Quittacas Pond
- Primary outflows: Mattapoisett River
- Basin countries: United States
- Surface area: 710 acres (290 ha)
- Average depth: 7 ft (2.1 m)
- Max. depth: 9 ft (2.7 m)
- Islands: Gull Island, High Bush Island, Low Bush Island

Snipatuit Pond is a shallow 710-acre (2.9 km^{2}) warm water pond in Rochester, Massachusetts. The average depth is five feet and the maximum depth is six feet, except for one very small nine foot hole near the pump station on the west shore. The pond is the headwaters of the Mattapoisett River. The inflow comes from two sources: Cedar Swamp, which is located to the northeast, and Great Quittacas Pond, which is connected to Snipatuit Pond and located to the northwest. The water quality is impaired due to wetlands vegetation. The boat access to the pond is a dirt ramp with limited parking located off Neck Road. Shoreline access is limited to the area east of the pond bordering Neck Road.
