= Assawompset Pond =

Reservoir in Lakeville and Middleborough, Massachusetts

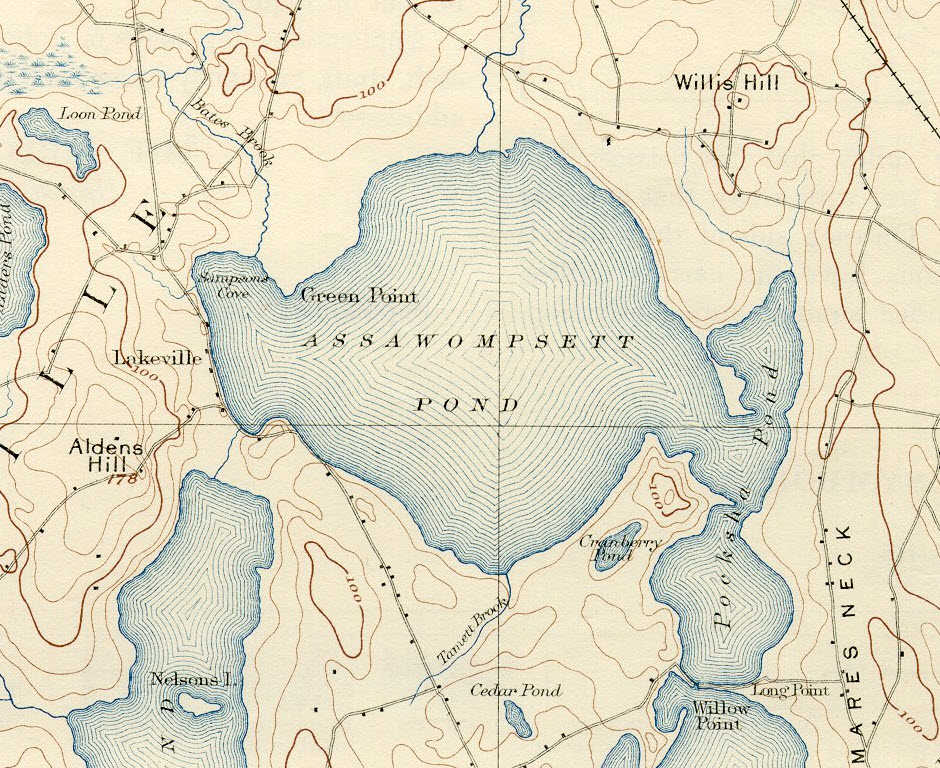
- 1893 Map of Assawompset Pond

- Location within Massachusetts Location within the United States
- Location: Lakeville and Middleboro, Massachusetts
- Coordinates: 41°50′25″N 70°55′10″W
- Type: reservoir/lake
- Primary inflows: Long Pond, Pocksha Pond
- Primary outflows: Nemasket River
- Basin countries: United States
- Surface area: 2,404 acres (3.756 sq mi; 973 ha)
- Surface elevation: 52 ft (16 m)

Assawompset Pond is a reservoir/pond within the towns of Lakeville and Middleboro, in southeastern Massachusetts. It shares its waters with Long Pond and is openly connected with Pocksha Pond. These lakes provide a source of drinking water to the city of New Bedford, the largest city in southeastern Massachusetts, and the City of Taunton. At almost four square miles (10 km^{2}), it is the largest natural lake in Massachusetts.

It is known in Wampanoag as "Place of the White Stones" and is host for the largest alewife (herring) run in Massachusetts. In the early spring the Nemasket River runs black with fish heading for the spawning grounds. The area known as Betty's Neck was one of the summer encampments for Native Americans who would traverse the Taunton River and Nemasket River to enter the pond. The Nemasket, being known as "Where the fish are", explains the significance as a food source.

King Philip's War began with the discovery of John Sassamon's body and the subsequent trial of his suspected murderers. His body was slipped under the ice on Assawompset Pond and found the following spring. The outcome of the trial sparked the beginning of hostilities.

The pond was dammed in 1894 at the Nemasket River, which raised the water level about five feet (1.5 m).

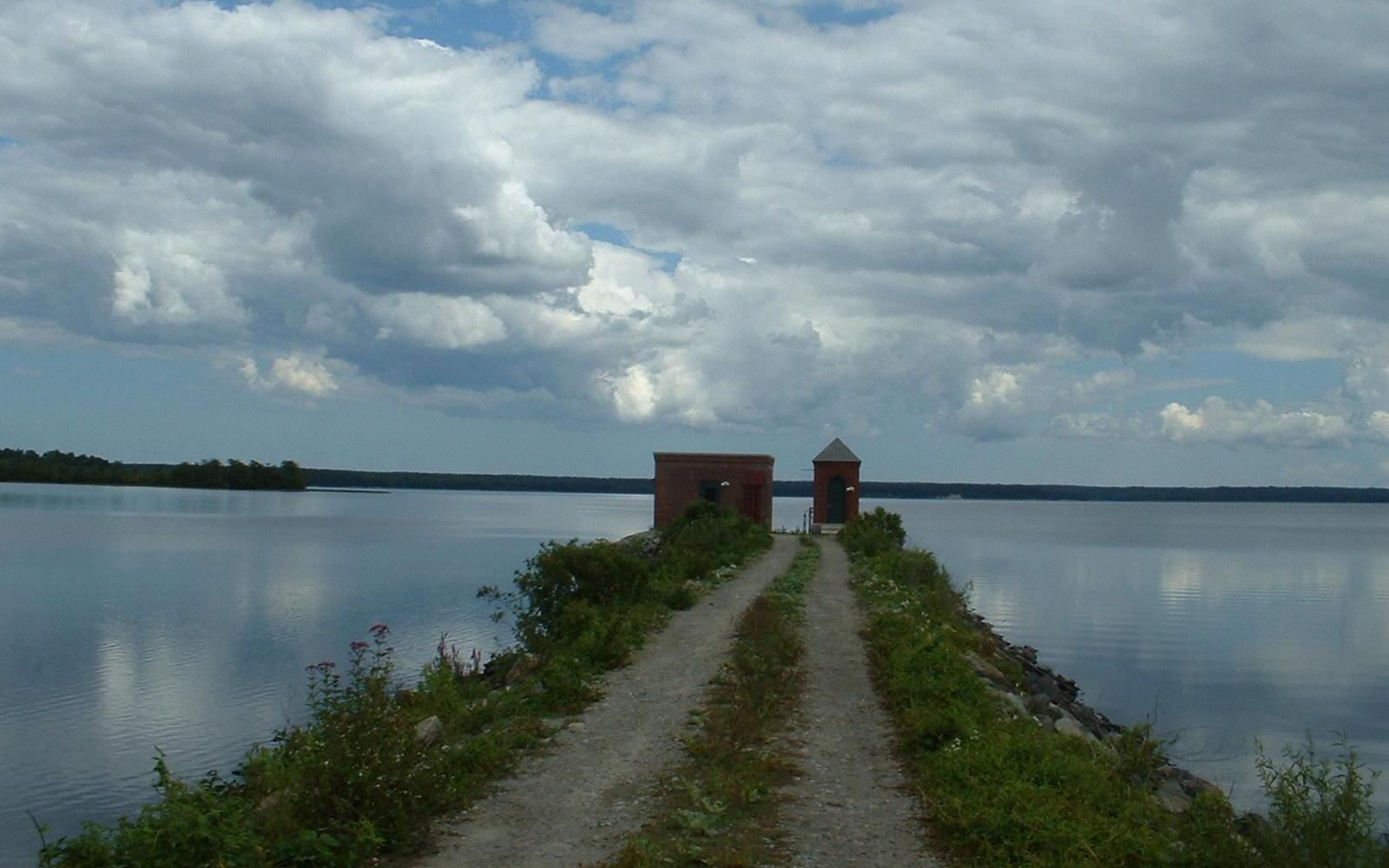
Assawomsett Pond in Lakeville
