= Avodah =

"work, worship, and service"

Avoda, or Avodah (Hebrew: עֲבוֹדָה, romanized: ʿăḇoḏāh, lit. 'work, worship, and service') means serving God in Judaism and in Modern Hebrew can simply mean "work".

== Original meaning ==
In its original, traditional sense, avodah was applied to sacrifices offered in the Temple in Jerusalem. The word was also used to describe the epitome of sacrificial rite, the complex and fraught main service of the High Priest of Israel on Yom Kippur (The Day of Atonement). Today it refers to a liturgical reenactment of the aforementioned ceremony which is recited during the Mussaf Amidah of Yom Kippur.

In Hasidic philosophy, avodah generally refers to divine service (or worship). For example, it is part of the divine service to serve God with joy.

== Bnei Akiva: Torah ve'avoda ==
Avodah is one of the two concepts that underlie the ideology of the Bnei Akiva movement; the other is Torah.

In this ideological framework, the word was originally utilised in a strictly agricultural context. "Avodah" meant working on a kibbutz. In more recent years, Bnei Akiva has had to redefine the terminology. Tens of thousands of its members currently live, or plan to live in an urban setting in Israel and it is generally perceived that the needs of Israel have developed somewhat since Bnei Akiva was founded. The movement has therefore subtly redefined Avodah, to mean work that contributes towards the building up of the land of Israel.

== See also ==
- Torah im Derech Eretz
- Avodah Zarah, Jewish laws around the avoidance of Idolatry in Judaism
