= Long Pond (Lakeville, Massachusetts) =

Lake in southeastern Massachusetts, United States

- Lake Apponequet
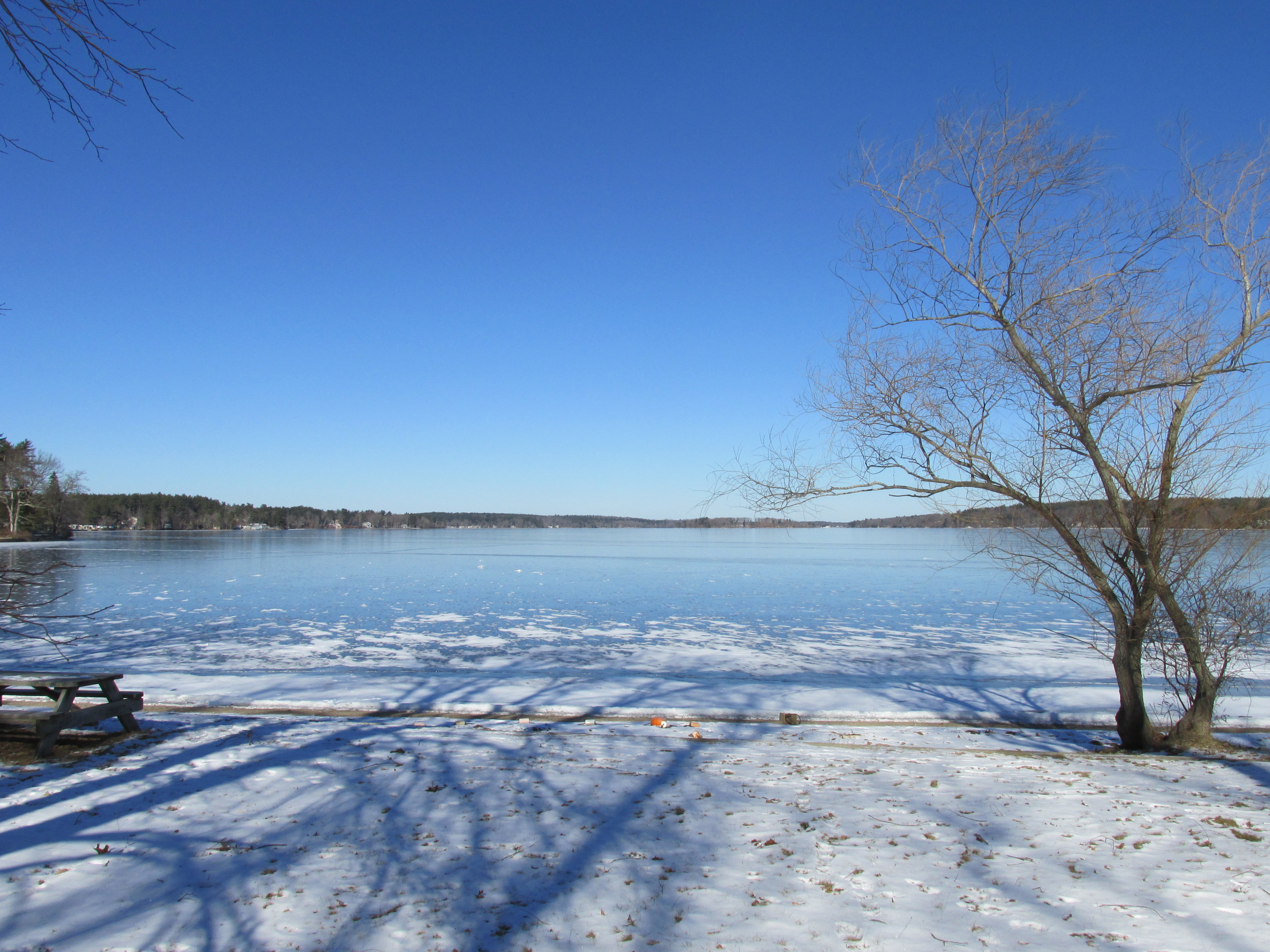
- Long Pond

- Location within Massachusetts Location within the United States
- Location: Plymouth and Bristol County, Massachusetts, U.S.
- Coordinates: 41°48′00″N 70°56′58″W
- Type: Natural freshwater lake
- Primary inflows: Stream fed from marshes
- Primary outflows: Long Pond River, aka Snake River
- Basin countries: United States
- Max. length: 4 mi (6.4 km)
- Max. width: 1 mi (1.6 km)
- Surface area: 1,721 acres (7.0 km^{2})
- Average depth: 9 ft (2.7 m)
- Max. depth: 12 ft (3.7 m)
- Surface elevation: 54 ft (16 m)
- Islands: 3 (Goat Island, Lewis Island, Nelson Island) plus the Parkhurst canal island
- Settlements: Lakeville; Freetown

Long Pond is a 1,721-acre (7.0 km^{2}) lake within the towns of Lakeville and Freetown, in southeastern Massachusetts. It shares its waters with Assawompset Pond. These lakes provide a source of drinking water to the city of New Bedford, the largest city in southeastern Massachusetts. Long Pond is roughly one mile (1.6 km) wide by four miles (6.4 km) miles long, and contains three islands within its boundaries. In 1894 Assawompset Pond was dammed, increasing the water depth of Long Pond (which is connected by a small river) by about five feet (1.5 m). This created Nelson Island and caused Sunken Island to disappear due to erosion. All that remains of Sunken Island are the rocks in a shallow area just to the northwest of Lewis Island. Lewis Island is the largest of the three remaining islands today, containing sixteen privately owned cottages, while the second largest island, Nelson Island, was purchased in 2005 and now is a year-round private residence. The smallest island, Goat Island, was recently purchased from the Boy Scouts by a private citizen. Along the perimeter of the lake are many homes and private access points to the waterfront. Long Pond is well known for fishing and boating.

At the northeast corner of the lake is a canal that meanders through the Parkhurst development and is navigable by boat. There is a small bridge that allows foot and road traffic onto the artificial island. In the northwest corner of the lake is a river that feeds into Assawompset Pond, which winds through the marshland before passing under Route 18 and connecting with Assawompset. It is locally known as the "Snake River," but is also labeled as the Long Pond River on some maps.

== Islands ==
There are three islands on Long Pond. They are listed from the southernmost to the northernmost island.

- Goat
- Lewis
- Nelson

== Navigational hazards ==
The lake has several potentially hazardous areas for boaters. There is a sand bar that connects Nelson Island to the mainland that varies from about three feet to only inches deep, and is sometimes fully exposed in the mid to late summer. Because of the lake's shallow depth (on average around nine feet), many large rocks pose serious threats. Not all of these rocks are clearly marked, but most are.

The largest of these rocks is known as Acre Rock because of its approximate size. It is flat on its top, lies close to the surface and sits midway between the east and west shores of the pond, approximately 1/4 mile north of Hemlock Point at Long Pond's southern end. Acre Rock lies approximately at the town line separating Lakeville and Freetown.

Another hazard to look out for is Sunken Island. It is located about 100 yards north from the north east corner of Lewis Island. Birds can sometimes been seen resting on these rocks.

For a boater inexperienced navigating Long Pond, it is always advisable to remain on the western side of the islands when traveling north or south to avoid the many rocks and sandbars that exist. Also when passing Nelson Island going north or south, always do so in the middle of the channel between the island and shoreline, due to a string of several rocks running north and south off the island's western tip. When entering the lake's southwestern area, to the west of Hemlock Point, avoid the middle of the entrance due to several rocks that are not always marked.

In 1913, seven people were killed when the Farina, a powerboat, sank in Long Pond.
