= Assonet =

Assonet may refer to:

- Assonet, Massachusetts
- Assonet River
- Assonet Bay
