= Assonet Burying Ground =

Cemetery in Assonet, Massachusetts, USA

Coordinates: 41.7898°N 71.0747°W

- Interactive map of Assonet Burying Ground

Details
- Established: c. 1800
- Location: Assonet, Massachusetts
- Country: United States
- Type: Public
- Owned by: Town of Freetown
- Size: 25 acres (100,000 m^{2})
- No. of graves: 2700+
- Find a Grave: Assonet Burying Ground

The Assonet Burying Ground is the main public cemetery for Freetown, Massachusetts.

Prior to becoming a cemetery, the land occupied by the Assonet Burying Ground was used as a military musterfield for the southeastern Massachusetts area. The cemetery is 25 acres (100,000 m^{2}), the first 13 acres (53,000 m^{2}) having been acquired by the town from Benedict and Thomas Andros in 1864, despite burials dating back to the late 18th century. The remaining 12 acres (49,000 m^{2}) were acquired from the heirs of Wallace T. Reynolds in 1956. Remains from two other cemeteries were moved to the Assonet Burying Ground, one cemetery having been disestablished, and the other having been reduced in size.

The entrance to the cemetery is on South Main Street, marked by two stone gates erected sometime prior to 1954. Near the entrance to the main cemetery is an abandoned receiving tomb, built of granite into the side of an earthen mound in 1892. East of the receiving tomb is a brick mausoleum, and on the northern edge of the cemetery is a tool shed built prior to 1910.

The cemetery is bounded on the north by the Assonet River, on the south by a residential subdivision, on the east by MA 24, and on the west by MA 79. The cemetery is at the southern extreme of the Assonet Historic District.

== Veterans Section ==
A special section of the cemetery for veterans, spouses, and dependents opened in 2012.

== Notable burials ==
- Maj. John M. Deane, recipient of the Medal of Honor for action during the American Civil War
- Preston Hubbard, bass player
- Mrs. Damaris Jones, wife of Elder Abner Jones
- Gen. Ebenezer W. Peirce, Civil War officer, local historian, and author
- Tec White, professional soccer player, Fall River F.C. and New Bedford Whalers
- Angie Beulah Withey Littlefield, head was stolen in 1991, theft was rumored to be related to satanic cult activity.
