= List of crossings of the Assonet River =

This is a list of bridges and other crossings of the Assonet River in Bristol County, Massachusetts from its confluence with the Taunton River upstream to the Cedar Swamp River.

Crossing	Carries	Location	Built	Coordinates
Unnamed highway bridge	Route 24	Assonet	1951	41°47′40.14″N 71°04′38.69″W
South Bridge (a/k/a South Main Street Bridge)	Route 79	Assonet	1886	41°47′38.00″N 71°04′03.23″W
East Bridge (a/k/a Elm Street Bridge)	Route 79	Assonet	1822	41°47′44.01″N 71°03′57.85″W
(ruins of old bridge)	Martin Lane (historic)	Assonet		41°47′52.40″N 71°03′51.49″W
Private bridge		Assonet	1950s	41°47′53.09″N 71°03′47.88″W
(New) Locust Street Bridge	Locust Street	Assonet	1960	41°47′57.19″N 71°03′36.12″W
(Old) Locust Street Bridge (ruins)		Assonet		41°47′57.19″N 71°03′36.12″W
Forge Road Bridge (Destroyed by flood in 2010)		Assonet		41°48′08.21″N 71°03′08.53″W
(New) Forge Road Bridge	Forge Road	Assonet	2012	41°48′08.21″N 71°03′08.53″W
Maple Tree Crossing (a/k/a Richmond Road Bridge)	Route 79	Assonet	1800s	41°48′49.69″N 71°02′18.35″W
rail bridge		Lakeville		41°49′01.92″N 71°02′03.82″W

== See also ==
- List of crossings of the Taunton River
