= Assonet Bay =

Lake in Massachusetts, United States

Coordinates: 41°48′05″N 71°05′28″W

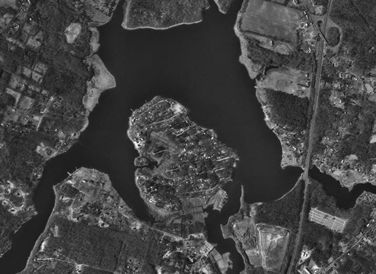
Aerial photo of Assonet Bay

Assonet Bay is a lake in Assonet, a village within the town of Freetown, Massachusetts. The Assonet River connects the waters of the bay with the Taunton River.
