= Bridgewater Triangle =

Area in Massachusetts claimed to be the site of paranormal phenomena

Coordinates: 41.93°N 71.09°W

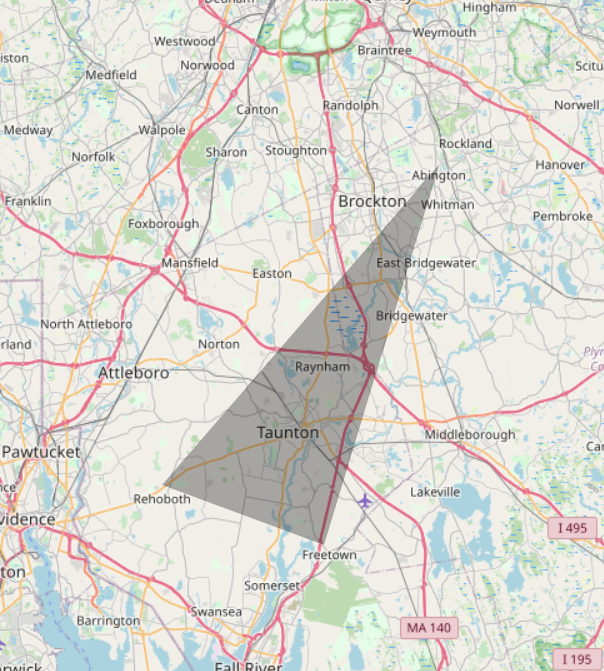
A map of the Bridgewater Triangle

The Bridgewater Triangle is an area of about 200 square miles (520 km^{2}) within southeastern Massachusetts in the United States, claimed to be a site of alleged paranormal phenomena, ranging from UFOs to poltergeists, and other spectral phenomena, various bigfoot-like sightings, giant snakes and thunderbirds. The term was coined by New England-based cryptozoologist Loren Coleman.

== Location ==
Specific boundaries of the Bridgewater Triangle were first described by cryptozoologist Loren Coleman who coined the term in the 1970s, and later in his book Mysterious America.

== Historic places and landmarks ==
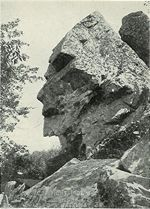
A 1902 postcard photo showing Profile Rock

- Freetown-Fall River State Forest - The Freetown-Fall River State Forest has reportedly been the site of various cult activity including animal sacrifice, ritualistic murders committed by admitted Satanists, as well as a number of gangland murders and a number of suicides.
- Profile Rock - The supposed site of where Wampanoag historical figure Anawan received the lost wampum belt from Philip. Legend has it the ghost of a man can be seen sitting on the rock with his legs crossed or with outstretched arms. Located within the Freetown-Fall River State Forest.
- Solitude Stone - An inscribed stone located near Forest Street in West Bridgewater which was found near a missing person's body. Also known as "suicide stone," the rock was found with the inscription: "All ye, who in future days, Walk by Nunckatessett stream Love not him who hummed his lay Cheerful to the parting beam, But the beauty that he wooed."
- Bridgewater State University - Several buildings and rooms on campus are alleged to be haunted by ghosts and other paranormal phenomena.
- Taunton State Hospital - Some visitors have claimed that they had strange paranormal experiences in the hospital including being touched and pulled in certain areas of the hospital. It is also claimed that the hospital was used by satanic cults during the 1960s and 70s.
- Hornbine School - The one-room schoolhouse was built during the 1840s and remained in active use until 1937. The building is alleged to be haunted by its former inhabitants.
- Hockomock Swamp - A large wetland that is much of the northern part of Southeastern Massachusetts and is considered the largest freshwater swamp in the state. It served as a major part of King Philip's War as a strategic base of operations for Metacomet (also known as King Philip) to launch assaults upon nearby English settlements. Hockomock is an Algonquin term meaning "place where spirits dwell." Hockomock was also a native burial ground. Many stories and legends are associated with the swamp. Due to this, even in modern times, it is considered by many to be a place of mystery and fear."

== Media ==
In 2021, the audio-drama podcast Bridgewater was produced, created by Aaron Mahnke, which follows a professor of the paranormal in his exploration of the Bridgewater Triangle. The podcast stars Misha Collins, Melissa Ponzio, and Karan Soni with guest appearances from Wil Wheaton. It ran two seasons, with a total of 22 episodes.

== Paranormal claims ==
Common to most of these areas is a mix of reported phenomena, that includes reports of:

- Unidentified flying objects, often in the form of bright balls of light or large, unusual spacecraft.
- Unnatural animal sightings, ranging from unusual reports of animals that are not found within the area (such as panthers and bears) to more supernatural claims of giant snakes and enormous vicious dogs.
- Paranormal humanoids, including sightings of Bigfoot, ghosts, poltergeists, and shadow people.
- Thunderbird sightings: Giant birds or pterodactyl-like flying creature with wingspans up to 12 feet are claimed to have been seen in Hockomock Swamp and neighboring Taunton and Easton, including a report by Norton Police Sergeant Thomas Downy.
- Cult activity, especially animal mutilations: Various incidents of animal mutilation have been reported, particularly in Freetown and Fall River, where local police were called to investigate mutilated animals believed to be the work of a cult. Two specific incidents in 1998 were reported: one in which a single adult cow was found butchered in the woods; the other in which a group of calves were discovered in a clearing, grotesquely mutilated as if part of a ritual sacrifice.
- Native American curses: According to one tale, Native Americans had cursed the swamp centuries ago because of conflict with Colonial settlers. A revered object of the Wampanoag people, a belt known as the wampum belt, was lost during King Philip's War. Legend says that the area owes its paranormal unrest to the fact that this belt was lost from the Native people.
- Pukwudgie: A creature from Algonquian folklore. The local Wampanoag people consider these "little people" to be dangerous tricksters. They have been especially associated with the Freetown State Forest within the Bridgewater Triangle.

== See also ==
- Fall River murders
- Lovecraft Country
- Bennington Triangle
