= Zerviah Gould Mitchell =

Wampanoag educator and basket weaver (1807–1878)

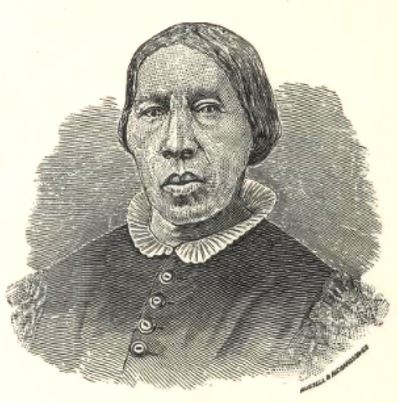
- Sketch of Mitchell (1878)
- Born: July 24, 1807; North Abington, Massachusetts, U.S.
- Died: March 5, 1898 (aged 90); Lakeville, Massachusetts, U.S.
- Citizenship: Wampanoag
- Occupations: Educator, basket weaver
- Known for: Direct descendant of Massasoit
- Spouse: Thomas Mitchell (m. 1824; died 1859)
- Children: 11

Zerviah Gould Mitchell (July 24, 1807 – March 5, 1898) was a Wampanoag educator, basket weaver, and direct descendant of the sachem Massasoit. In 1878, she published Indian History, Biography and Genealogy: Pertaining to the Good Sachem Massasoit of the Wampanoag Tribe, and His Descendants with historian Ebenezer W. Peirce, and the book included a narration of the life of Massasoit, as well as a genealogy of Massasoit's descendants.

== Early life and heritage ==
Mitchell was born in North Abington, Massachusetts, to Brister Gould (1759–1823) and Phebe Squinn (1770–1839). Her maternal grandmother, Lydia Tuspaquin (c. 1740–1812), was the great-great-granddaughter of Massasoit, sachem of the Wampanoag Native American people during the 17th century. Mitchell's mother was full-blooded Wampanoag, while her father was African American and had been born into slavery in Abington. Slavery was effectively abolished in Massachusetts in 1783, and Gould was subsequently manumitted.

== Marriage and children ==
In 1824, she married Thomas C. Mitchell (1795–1859), a merchant sailor of African-American descent. Some sources claim that Thomas Mitchell was half Cherokee, although this would be unlikely given their location. The couple had eleven children: Jane (1827–1840), Zerviah (1828–1923), Levinia (1830–1841), Delores (1834–1875), Melinda (1836–1919), Thomas (1838–1859), John (1841–1870), Lydia (1843–?), Emma (1846–1932), Charlotte (1848–1930), and Alonzo (1850–1921). Five of Mitchell's children survived her.

Mitchell was well educated and worked as a teacher at a private school in Boston while her husband would spend prolonged periods of time overseas. She was also the first person of African-American descent to apply to Wheaton College, though she was turned down.

== Later life ==
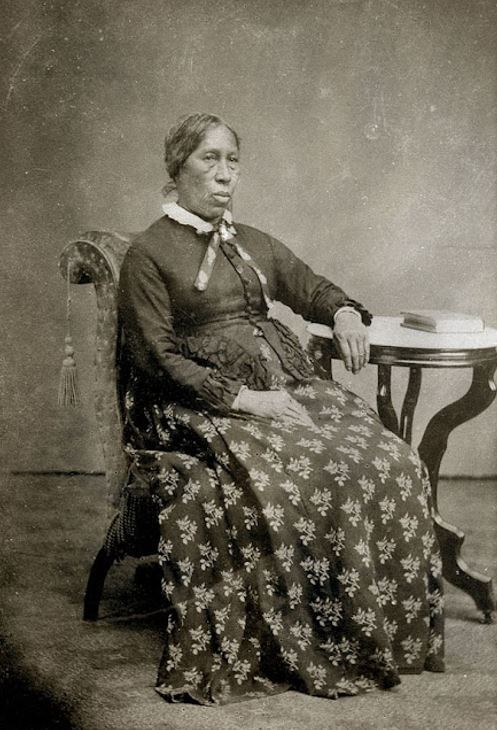
Mitchell (c. 1870s)

Mitchell first challenged the Commonwealth of Massachusetts’ treatment of Native Americans in 1857, when she petitioned to have the guardianship removed from four lots of land on the Fall River Indian Reservation. She held ancestral land rights to the lots on the reservation, but the land had been entrusted to white merchant and justice of the peace, Benjamin F. Winslow (1813–1883). Mitchell's land rights were affirmed by 1861, yet she received considerable hostility from other residents of the reservation, who saw her land claim as purely self-serving. Nevertheless, her petition has since been considered an important contributing factor towards the enfranchisement of Native Americans in Massachusetts in 1869, which resulted in the end of the guardianship system.

Following the death of her husband in 1859, Mitchell relocated to her homestead in Betty's Neck, on the Indian reservation in Lakeville with her daughters Melinda and Charlotte, both of whom were unmarried. Mitchell and her daughters supported themselves at Betty's Neck through basket weaving, telling fortunes, and selling flowers and herbs. In 1878, she published Indian History, Biography and Genealogy: Pertaining to the Good Sachem Massasoit of the Wampanoag Tribe, and His Descendants, which was written with historian Ebenezer W. Peirce, who went to Mitchell for guidance on Massasoit's biography and Wampanoag history and culture. After publishing her book, she often received visits from scholars and news reporters, and she played an important role in educating about the Wampanoag people.

In 1861, she was listed as Fall River Wampanoag on the Earle Report.

Mitchell died at her home in Betty's Neck, Lakeville, on March 5, 1898, aged 90. Her death was reported in The Boston Journal and the New York Herald, both of which described her as a Native American “Princess”.

== Sources ==
Pulsipher, Jenny H. (2003). ""Subjects... Unto the Same King": New England Indians and the Use of Royal Political Power". Massachusetts Historical Review. 5: 55. JSTOR 25081179.
