= East Freetown, Massachusetts =

Village in Massachusetts, United States

- East Freetown Historic District
- U.S. National Register of Historic Places
- U.S. Historic district
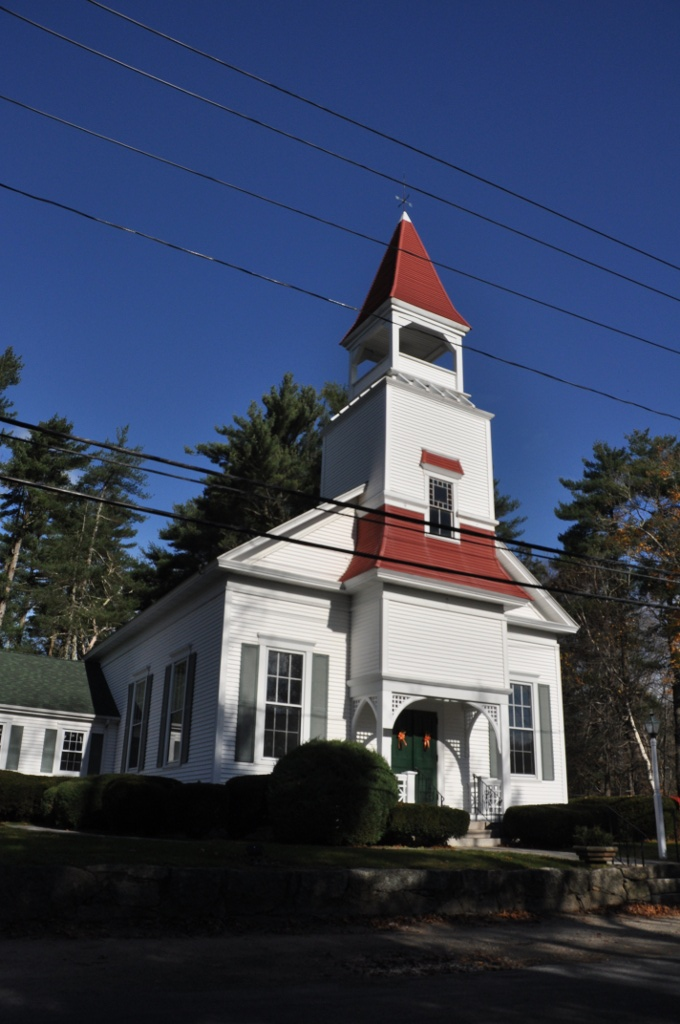
- East Freetown Congregational Church

- Location within Massachusetts Location within the United States
- Location: Freetown, Massachusetts
- Coordinates: 41°46′22″N 70°57′55″W
- Built: 1727
- Architect: Clothier Franklin Edminster; Abial S. Ashley
- Architectural style: Colonial Revival, Georgian
- NRHP reference No.: 99001115
- Added to NRHP: September 9, 1999

East Freetown is one of two villages in the town of Freetown, Massachusetts, United States. Added to the town in 1747, East Freetown was originally an outpost settlement of Tiverton, Rhode Island, then a part of Massachusetts. It rests on the shore of Long Pond.

== History ==
East Freetown was made a part of Freetown as a result of the Pocasset Purchase of 1747. It remained less economically developed and industrialized than its sister village, Assonet well into the 20th century. The village was the birthplace of Massachusetts Governor Marcus Morton.

=== Historic District ===
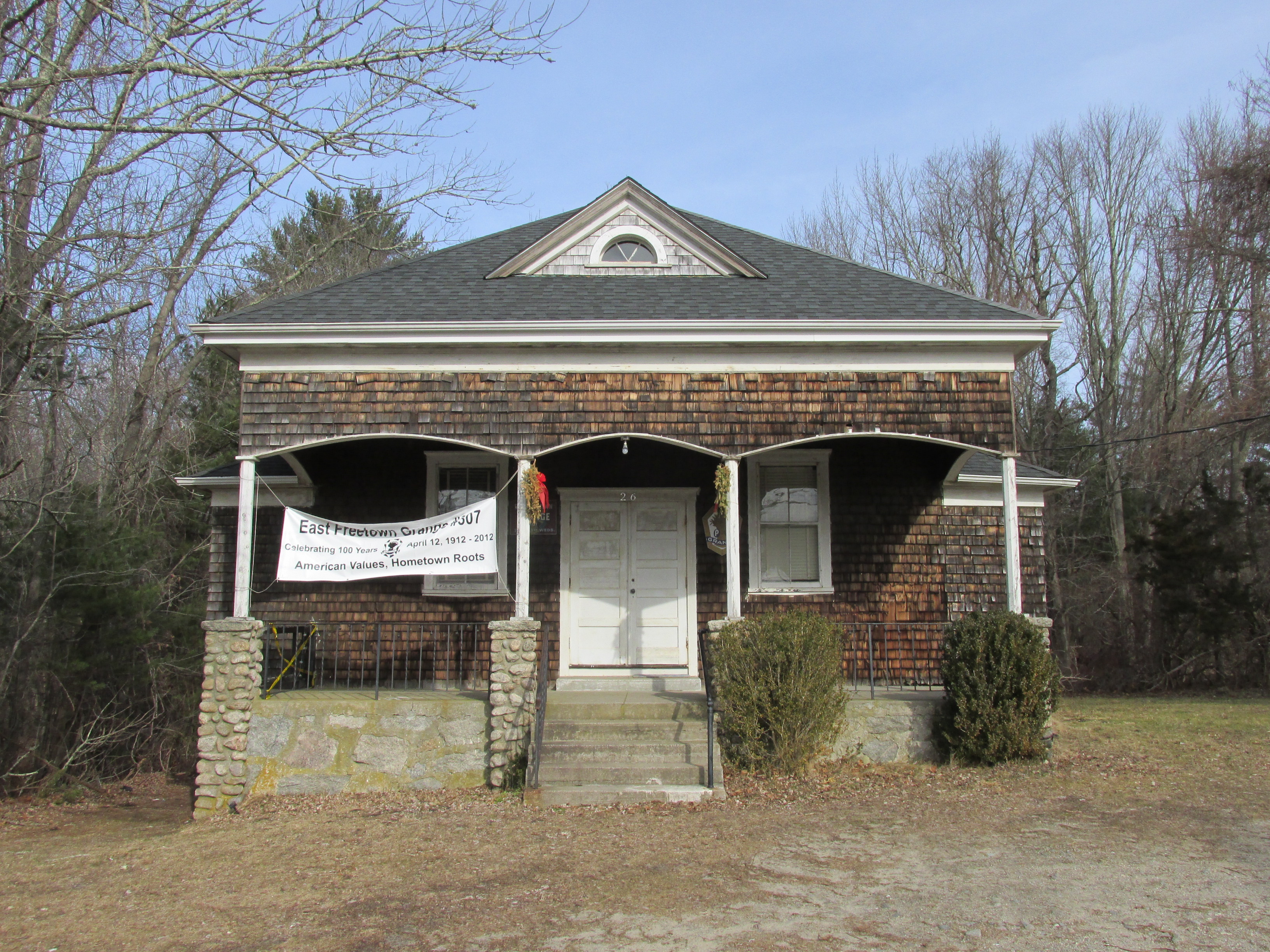
East Freetown Grange #307

The East Freetown Historic District has been on the National Register of Historic Places since 1999. It contains many buildings, sites, and features of local historical significance. The district is located roughly along Howland, Gurney, Washburn County Roads.

== Geography ==
East Freetown is located in Southeastern Massachusetts. It is bounded by Dartmouth, Fall River, New Bedford, Lakeville, Assonet, Rochester, Acushnet, and Long Pond. It has a hilly terrain, with many outcroppings of bedrock. Maple, elm, oak, pine, and birch trees are common throughout. Numerous streams and brooks flow through the village, including Fall Brook.

Many peninsulas exist around Long Pond, laying site for summer resorts such as Heaven's Heights and Hemlock Point. A small portion of the village comprises a part of the Freetown-Fall River State Forest.

== Churches ==
Several churches have been built in East Freetown.

=== St. John Neumann Church ===
St. John Neumann Church is a Roman Catholic parish covering the village of East Freetown. On the grounds of the church are Cathedral Camp and Our Lady of the Lake camp, both of which combined to form the co-ed Cathedral Camp. The camp has an extensive outdoor program, including swimming and boating on Long Pond.

=== East Freetown Congregational-Christian Church ===
The East Freetown Congregational-Christian Church is a gathering of people who emphasize music, prayer, and Bible-based preaching as part of their worship life together. The congregation is bound by a covenant and is considered "non-credal". That means there is no declared statement which is used as a filter of membership. The congregation has not been part of any other denomination or structure since its gathering in 1831. From its inception in the New England Christian Connexion movement of the 18th-19th century, the congregation has maintained five tenets of that movement: 1. the Lordship of Jesus Christ as the sole head of the church; 2. the use of no other name than "Christian"; 3. the canonical Scriptures as the only rule of faith and practice; 4. individual duty of the interpretation of the Scriptures; 5. Christian character as a test of fellowship. The church took on the additional title "Congregational" in 1931 as a recognition of the historical roots of its polity, and as part of an emerging spirit of communion among Reformed tradition American churches. ed

== Schools ==
From the early 19th century until 1950, Freetown was serviced by several neighborhood grammar schools, several of which existed in East Freetown.

- Furnace School
- Mason's Corner School

=== Public & Regional ===
- Apponequet Regional High School — zoned public high school.
- Bristol‑Plymouth Regional Technical School — vocational; Freetown is a member town.
- Bristol County Agricultural High School (Bristol Aggie) — agricultural/vocational; open to all Bristol County residents.

=== Private & Specialized ===
- Bishop Stang High School — private Catholic college‑prep in North Dartmouth.
- Whitney Academy — private therapeutic school in East Freetown.
- Tabor Academy — private boarding/day school in Marion.

== See also ==
- National Register of Historic Places listings in Bristol County, Massachusetts
