= Hockomock Swamp =

Swampland in Massachusetts, United States of America

Coordinates: 41°59′30″N 71°04′43″W

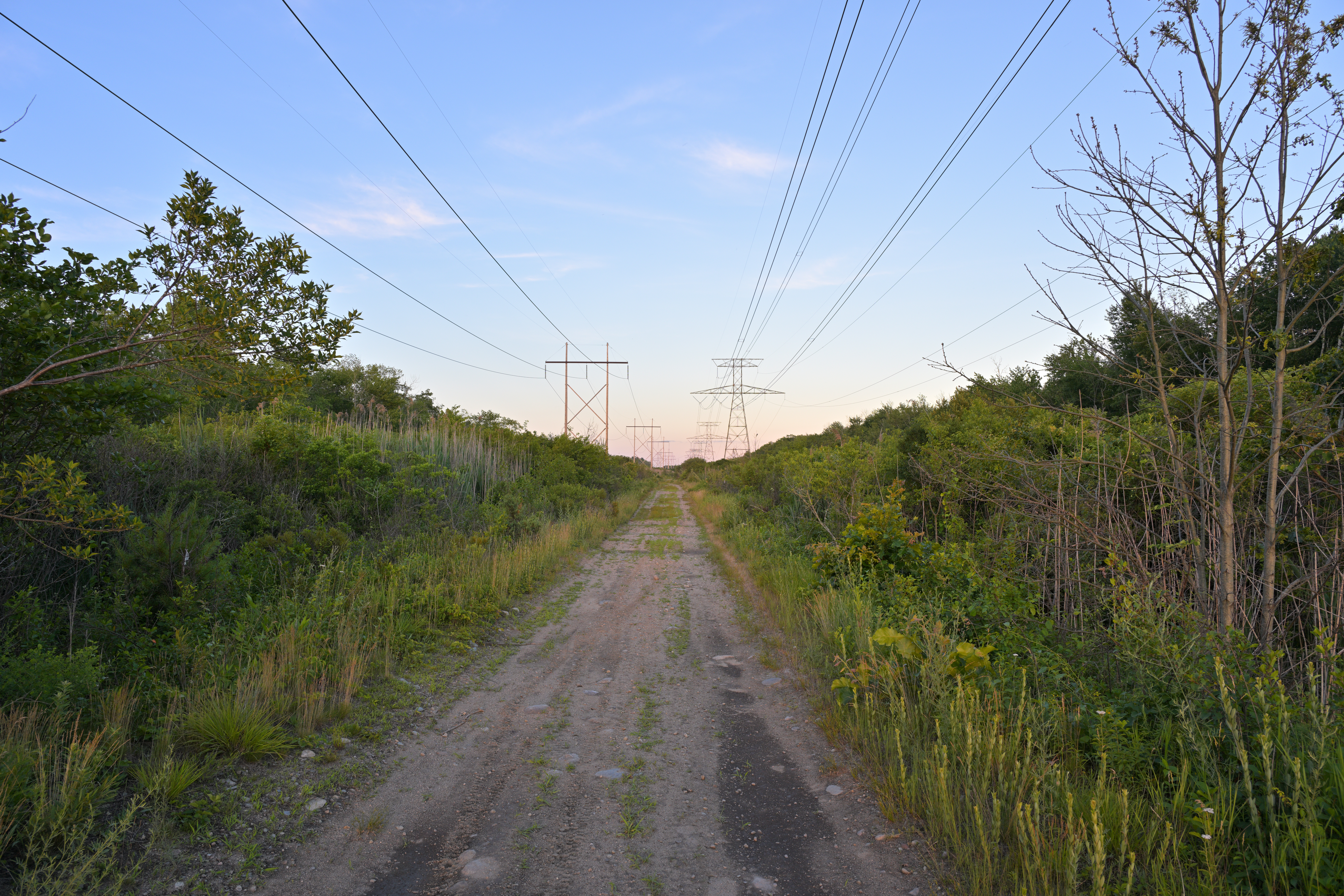
The Bay Circuit Trail and power lines in the Hockomock Swamp in Easton, Massachusetts

The Hockomock Swamp is a vast wetland encompassing much of the northern part of southeastern Massachusetts, United States. This 16,950-acre (6,859 ha) land is considered the largest freshwater swamp in the state. It acts as a natural flood control mechanism for the region.

== History ==
During the seventeenth century, the Hockomock Swamp was used as a fortress by the Wampanoag, the predominating tribe of natives in the area, against invasion by early English settlers. It played a role in King Philip's War as a strategic base of operations for Metacomet (also known as King Philip) to launch assaults upon nearby English settlements.

During the eighteenth and nineteenth centuries, Euro-American settlers deemed the swamp to be worthless, barren land, and attempted to drain it and convert it into profitable farmland. Reverend and historian William L. Chaffin of Easton was an early advocate of drainage schemes.

However, the natives of the region placed a higher value on the swamp. For centuries, natives had relied on hunting game there, and the swamp had gained a revered status among them. They named it Hockomock, the Algonquin term meaning "place where spirits dwell." In addition to life-sustaining activities, much of the swamp served a dual purpose as a sacred burial ground. The Hockomock is occasionally referred to as the Hobomock. The Wampanoag worshiped and feared Hobomock (aka Hobbamock), the chief deity of death and disease. Hobomock, composed of human souls of the dead, was known to congregate in areas like the Hockomock. Thus, the terms Hockomock and Hobomock became interchangeable among non-natives when referring to the swamp or the spirit.

There are many stories and legends that have become associated with the swamp. Even in modern times, it has, for some, remained a place of mystery and fear. The paranormal enthusiast community considers the Hockomock Swamp part of the "Bridgewater Triangle."

== Archaeology ==
Excavation of the Hockomock and its immediate surrounding areas on the Taunton River have produced very important archaeological findings dating back to the Early Archaic Period of North America.

From 1946 to 1951 the Warren K. Moorehead Chapter of the Massachusetts Archaeological Society worked under Director Dr. Maurice Robbins to unearth the Titicut site. The Titicut Site, located along the Taunton River in Bridgewater produced thousands of artifacts dating from the Early Archaic to the Contact Period (8600 to 400 B.P.) including hearths and pits, post molds, red paint ceremonial deposits and a rectangular lodge floor. In addition to these examples of life at that time was the discovery of the Taunton River Bifurcate (Arrowhead). Thirteen of these points, used in hunting large game animals, were discovered. The Nunkatusset River Site, which runs from Lake Nippenicket through the Hockomock Swamp, also produced Bifurcated points.

== Environment ==
The swamp's environment is part of the Northeastern coastal forests ecoregion. It spans six municipalities in Massachusetts: Bridgewater, Easton, Norton, Raynham, Taunton, and West Bridgewater. At least 13 rare and endangered species of plant and animal reside in the Hockomock, including the Long's bulrush, ringed boghaunter dragonfly, gypsywort, Blanding's turtle, round-fruited false-loosestrife, two-flowered bladderwort, blue-spotted salamander, spotted turtle, Mystic Valley amphipod, chain fern borer moth, Plymouth gentian, eastern box turtle and common barn owl. The Division of Fisheries and Wildlife (Massachusetts) owns approximately 5,000 acres within all six communities and the Hockomock Swamp Wildlife Management Area provides access to the public via recreational areas. Activities such as hunting, fishing, boating, canoeing, swimming and observation of and study of flora and fauna are allowed and encouraged. The swamp is traversed by the 200-mile long Bay Circuit Trail. Major habitats include oak-conifer forest, cultivated grassland, cultivated field, emergent freshwater wetland, palustrine woodland swamp, shrub-scrub wetland, lake/pond, river/stream, and stopover areas for migratory birds.

Most of the swamp remains untouched by development, in large part due to many years of pushing for environmental protection legislation. In 1971, approximately one year after the United States Environmental Protection Agency was established, Massachusetts House of Representatives member John Ames presented findings from several intellectual leaders in the field. A modern-day proponent of conservation, Mr. Ames ensured that the Hockomock was protected by law. "Hockomock: Wonder Wetland" was the pamphlet received by each and every legislator at the time. Included were works by Kathleen Anderson, then Director of the Manomet Bird Observatory and Ted Williams, then Managing Editor of the Massachusetts Division of Fisheries and Game's "Massachusetts Wildlife" magazine. The Hockomock Swamp system was designated an Area of Critical Environmental Concern in 1990.

== See also ==
- Taunton River Watershed
- Dighton Rock
