= Lake Nippenicket =

Lake in Massachusetts, United States

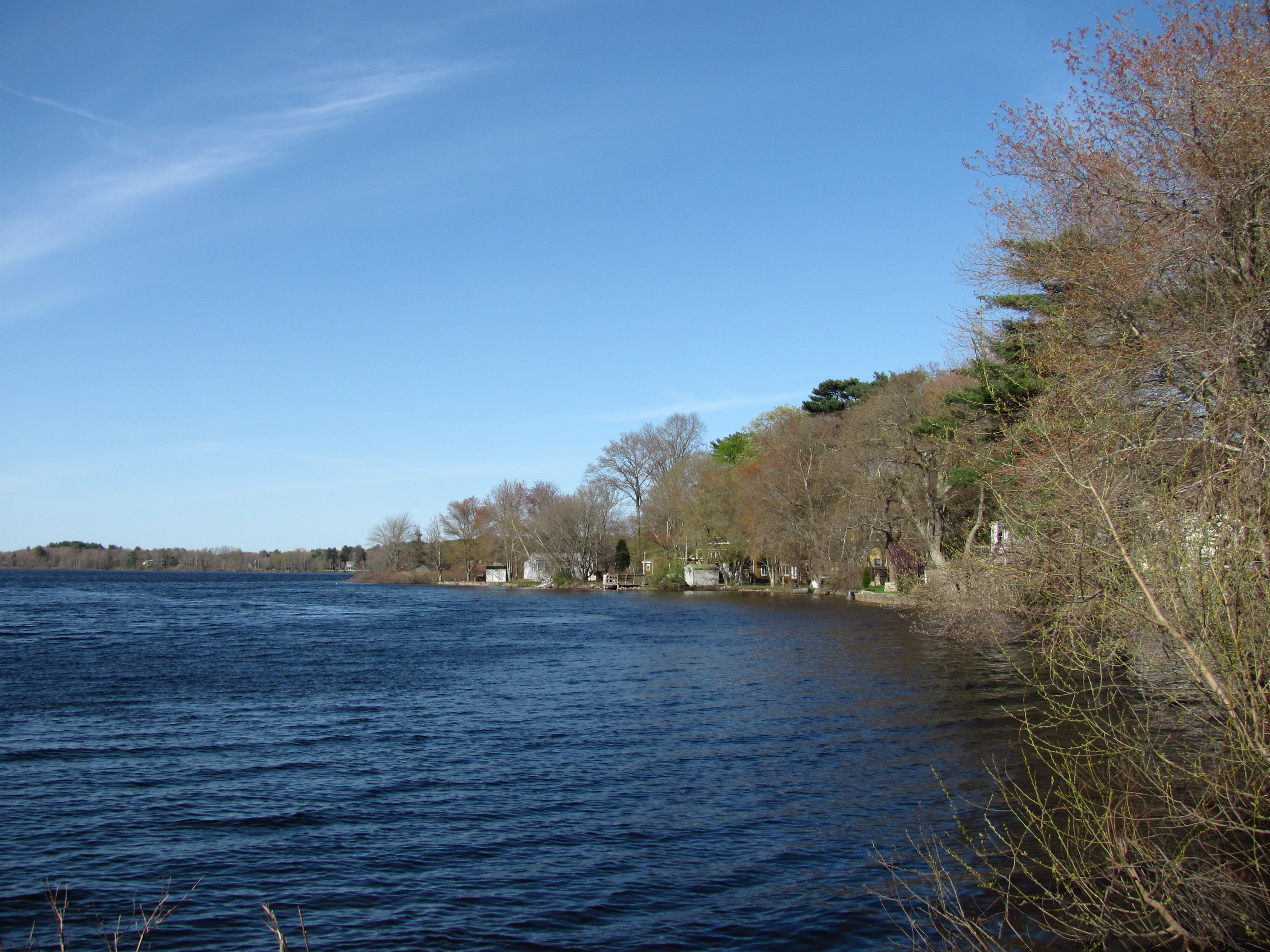
- Lake Nippenicket

- Location within Massachusetts Location within the United States
- Location: Plymouth and Bristol County, Massachusetts, U.S.
- Coordinates: 41°58′19″N 71°02′28″W
- Type: Natural freshwater pond
- Basin countries: United States
- Surface area: 354 acres (143 ha)
- Average depth: 3 ft (0.91 m)
- Max. depth: 6 ft (1.8 m)
- Surface elevation: 56 ft (17 m)
- Settlements: Bridgewater, Massachusetts

Lake Nippenicket, known locally as The Nip, is a freshwater pond in the town of Bridgewater, Massachusetts, and immediately adjacent to Raynham, Massachusetts. The lake borders a tiny portion of Route 104, and is near the junction of I-495 and Route 24. Lake Nippenicket is part of the Taunton River Watershed, emptying into the Town River and into the Taunton River, and a good-size portion of it is included with the Hockomock Swamp Wildlife Management Area. The lake is named after a Native American tribe from that area.
