= Freetown-Fall River State Forest =

Protected area in Massachusetts, United States

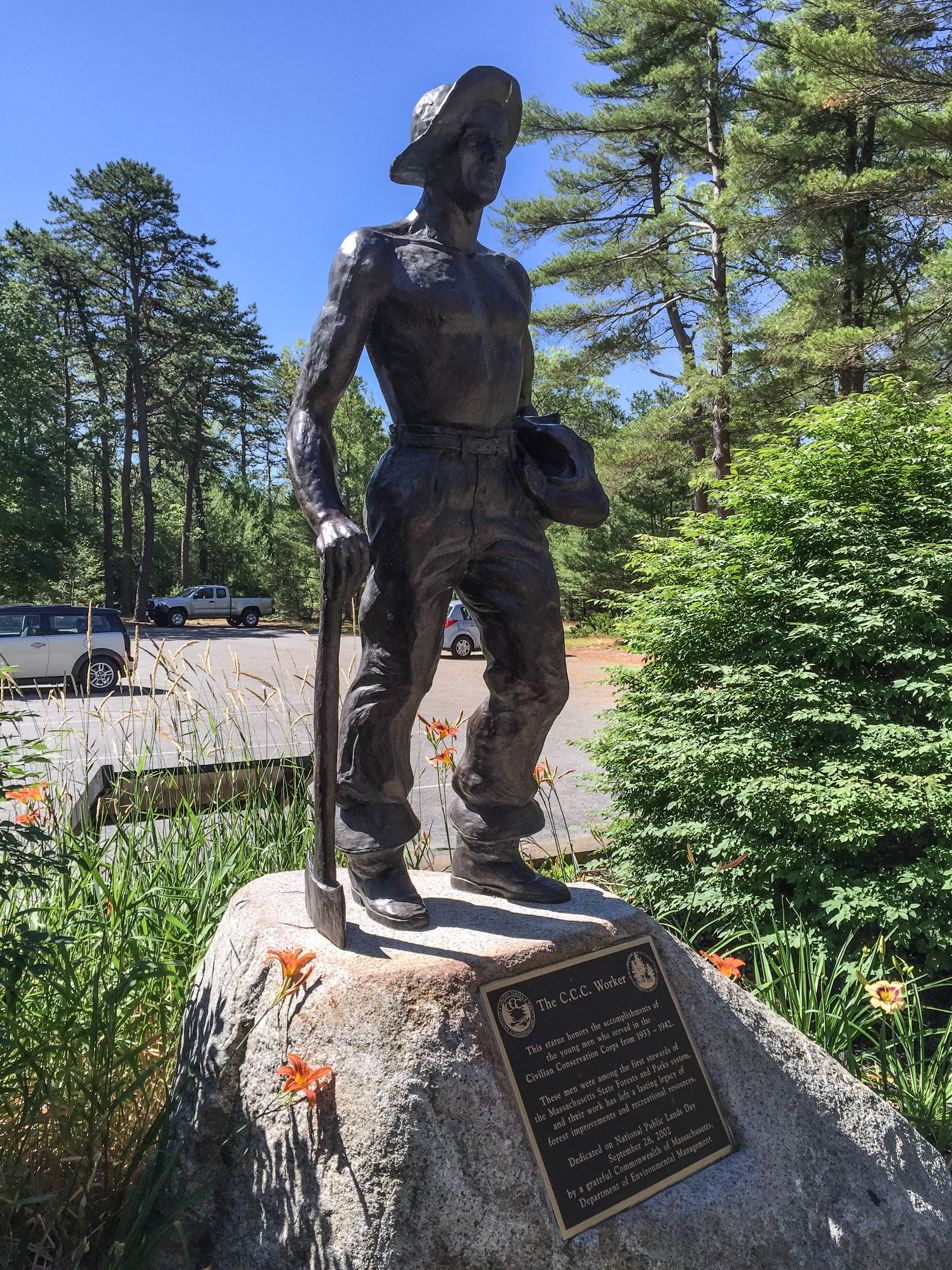
- Statue of the C.C.C. Worker

- Location within Massachusetts Location within the United States
- Location: Freetown, Fall River and Lakeville, Massachusetts, United States
- Coordinates: 41°47′44″N 71°03′13″W
- Area: 5,217 acres (2,111 ha)
- Elevation: 187 ft (57 m)
- Established: 1913
- Administrator: Massachusetts Department of Conservation and Recreation
- Website: Official website

The Freetown-Fall River State Forest (commonly shortened to Freetown State Forest) is a publicly owned forest covering more than 5,000 acres (2,000 ha) in the city of Fall River and the towns of Freetown and Lakeville in the state of Massachusetts. The forest lies mostly in the center of the town of Freetown (about a third of the town) dividing Assonet, East Freetown, and Fall River's northernmost boundary. The forest land includes Profile Rock, a granite outcropping which local Native Americans believe to be the image of Chief Massasoit, and a 227-acre (92 ha) Pocasset reservation. The forest is owned by the Commonwealth of Massachusetts and operated by the Department of Conservation and Recreation with headquarters in Assonet.

== History ==
The state first acquired land in Assonet for forest purposes in 1913, purchasing approximately nine acres on Forge Pond from Levi Churchill of Berkley. The majority of the land was acquired over twenty years beginning in the 1930s. Recent additions to the forest have included 87 acres (2012), 29 acres (2015), and 77 acres (2015) in Assonet and 613 acres (2015) in Lakeville.

The Civilian Conservation Corps worked on the property from 1935 to 1937. On September 28, 2002, National Public Lands Day, a statue was dedicated in honor of the program and its efforts in the forest.

== Activities and amenities ==
The forest has more than 50 miles (80 km) of unpaved roads and trails for walking, hiking, biking, cross-country skiing, dog sledding, off-road vehicle, and equestrian use. A picnic area with wading pool, playing fields and restrooms is located near the main entrance. Rattlesnake Brook is stocked with brook trout in spring. Hunting is available on a restricted basis.

== In the news ==
Fires

The Freetown State Forest has suffered fires on several occasions. In September 1980, a fire burned approximately 230 acres (93 ha) of woodland adjacent to and in the state forest over the course of a week. Fires in 1988 and 1991 burned an estimated 100 acres (40 ha) each, while a fire in March 1976 destroyed an estimated 500 acres (200 ha). The last major fire occurred on April 30, 2001, when fire destroyed between 90 and 100 acres (40 ha) of the forest. Most of the fires were put out on April 30, while small fires continued into May 1.

Crimes and incidents

The Freetown State Forest has been the location of several crimes and incidents. Due to these events, the forest has become associated with the so-called "Bridgewater Triangle"

In November 1978, the body of Mary Lou Arruda, a 15-year-old cheerleader abducted from Raynham, Massachusetts that September, was discovered tied to a tree in the state forest. James M. Kater of Brockton, previously convicted of kidnapping in 1967, was convicted of the kidnapping and murder of Arruda in 1979. The Massachusetts Supreme Judicial Court overturned the verdict, and he was convicted again in 1986. The verdict once again overturned; he was retried in 1992, with that attempt ending in a mistrial.

In 1980, while investigating another local murder, police had been approached by individuals who claimed to have witnessed Satanic cult activity within the state forest. These reports would have bearing on the fourth Kater trial (1996–2000) which ended with the conviction upheld. In the 1996 trial, the defense charged that police had withheld information relating to the alleged Satanic cult activity, which it claimed could have provided an alternative to Kater.

Three more murders were subsequently related to the state forest. In 1987, a transient drifter mistaken for an undercover police officer was murdered in the forest, and in 2001, two men were found shot to death on Bell Rock Road, which runs through the forest connecting Assonet and Fall River. Two assaults were also reported: a Fall River man in 1991 and a teenager from New Bedford in 1998.

Other incidents include hazardous waste dumping (1996), reports of aggressive abandoned dogs (2006), and reports of an escaped emu wandering the forest (2006). In May 2015, a woman slid 80 feet down a cliff while spray-painting graffiti, broke her ankle, and had to be rescued. In January 2016, an illegally dumped boat was discovered. In May 2016, wire cables were found stretched across the recreational trails, apparently intended to cause harm to off-road motorbike riders.

== Gallery ==
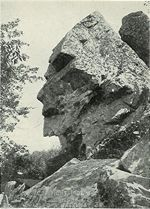
Profile Rock, 1902

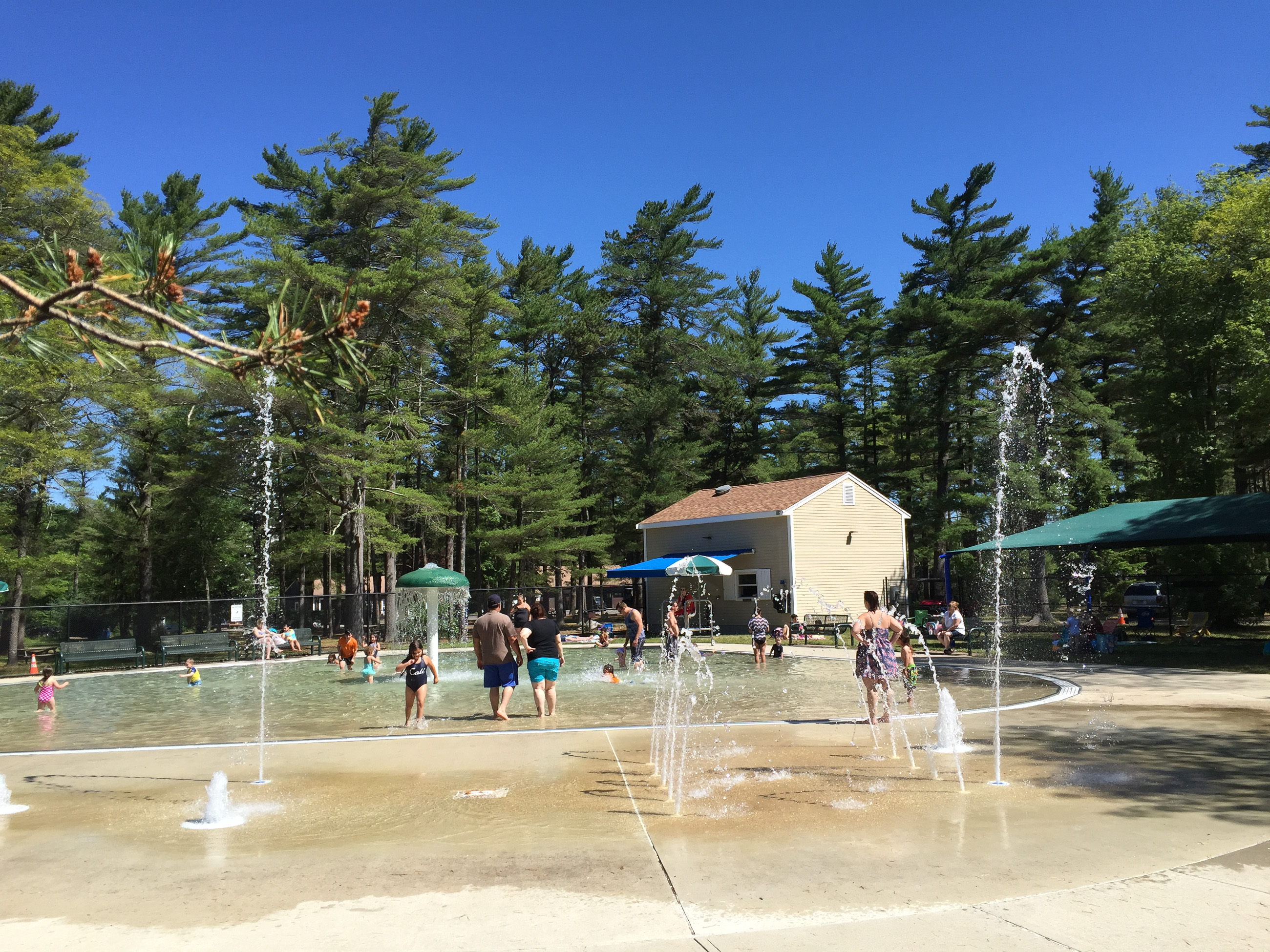
Wading pool

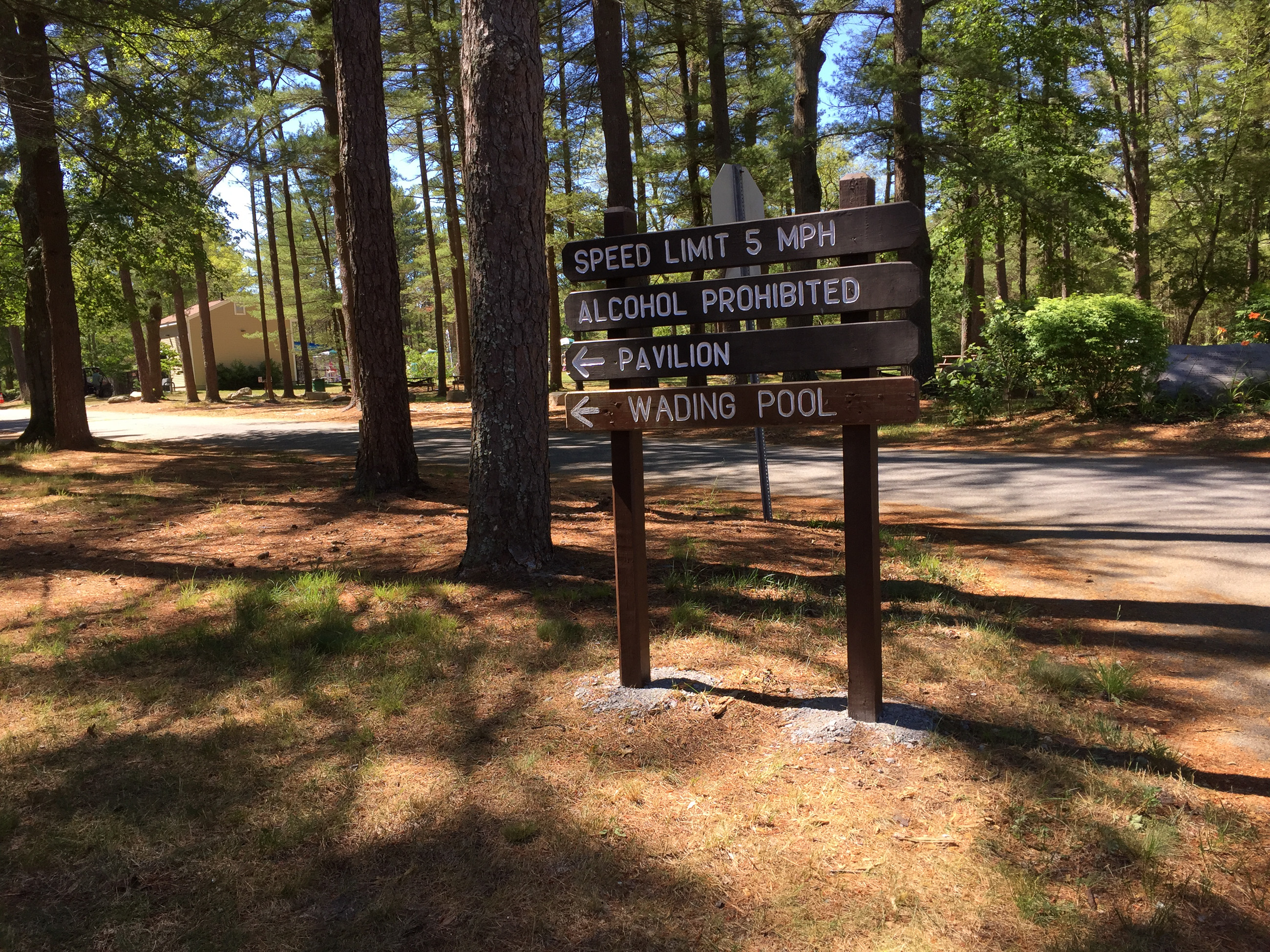
Sign near the entrance directs visitors to the Pavilion and Wading Pool

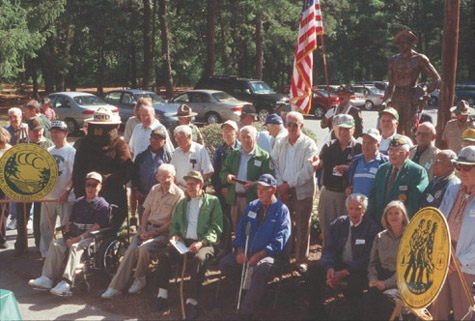
The unveiling of the CCC statue at the forest on September 28, 2002.
