= Cedar Swamp River =

River in Massachusetts

Coordinates: 41.820°N 71.029°W

The Cedar Swamp River is a small river in Lakeville, Massachusetts that flows 4.6 miles (7.4 km) in a northwesterly direction through the western part of the town to where it forms the Assonet River near the Freetown line, just south of the village of Myricks. It is a tributary of the Taunton River.

The river is crossed by a railroad line that was originally built as the Taunton and New Bedford Railroad in 1840. It is now operated by CSX.

== See also ==
- Taunton River Watershed
