= Conspiracy Island =

Island in Bristol County, Massachusetts, United States

Coordinates: 41°46′59.92″N 71°06′54.99″W

Conspiracy Island is a privately owned tidal island situated in the Assonet River off Berkley, Massachusetts.

According to the 2000 census, Conspiracy Island is uninhabited. In very low tides, the island is actually a peninsula, accessible across a sandy stretch of land connecting it to a nearby beach.

A Gazetteer of the State of Massachusetts, published in 1890, describes the history of localities in Massachusetts. In its listing for Berkley, the book states that the island may have received its name from its connection to King Philip, himself the namesake of King Philip's War. Berkley's history also includes a legend that in 1675 on Conspiracy Island King Phillip formed his confederacy.

== Geography ==
According to the Town of Berkley Board of Assessors, the island has a total area of 0.75 acres (3,000 m^{2}). There is no differentiation in the description between how much is land and how much is water. It is covered predominantly in grass with a few small cedar trees.

== Demographics ==
Conspiracy Island is uninhabited and undeveloped. It is used for camping and swimming by the owners. Public access is not allowed, but is a frequent occurrence.
