= Ebenezer W. Peirce =

19th-century American military officer

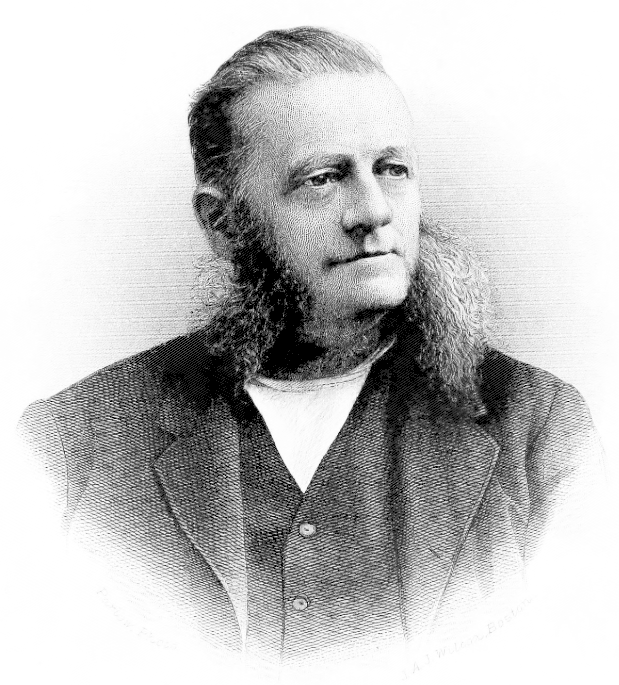
- Born: April 10, 1822; Assonet, Massachusetts
- Died: August 14, 1902 (aged 80); Assonet, Massachusetts
- Burial place: Assonet Burying Ground
- Military career
- Allegiance: United States of America; Union
- Branch: United States Army; Union Army
- Service years: 1843–1864
- Rank: Brigadier General (Massachusetts Militia); Colonel (Union Army)
- Conflicts: American Civil War
- Other work: Farmer

Ebenezer Weaver Peirce (April 10, 1822 – August 14, 1902), was a brigadier general in the Massachusetts militia, serving as 90–day volunteers in the Union Army in the opening months of the American Civil War, and a colonel of the 29th Massachusetts Infantry Regiment of the Union Army between December 1861 and July 1864. He later became a farmer, real estate speculator, historian and genealogist.

== Biography ==
Peirce was born in Assonet, Massachusetts to Ebenezer and Joanna (Weaver) Peirce. He attended local schools in Assonet and Andover Academy. He inherited an estate rich in real estate and took up sheep farming. Peirce enlisted in the 4th Artillery, Massachusetts Volunteer Militia, in 1843, and continued his service up to and including the Civil War.

In 1861, Peirce was a brigadier general in the Massachusetts State Militia. Serving under Major General Benjamin F. Butler at Fort Monroe in Virginia, he was in direct command of the Union forces at the Battle of Big Bethel in June, 1861. This attempted assault on two nearby Confederate positions failed because it was too complex for the largely untrained unit, who inadvertently gave away their own position through a friendly fire incident. Peirce received most of the blame.

On December 13, 1861, Peirce joined the volunteer forces as colonel of the 29th Massachusetts Infantry Regiment. His regiment was located at Fort Monroe and was involved in the Battle of Hampton Roads. He was court-martialed for incompetence and presenting burlesque shows to the troops of his command, but was acquitted. Peirce then fought in the Peninsula campaign and the Seven Days Battles where, on June 30, 1862, he lost his right arm at the Battle of White Oak Swamp, considered part of the larger Battle of Glendale. He was out of action until November 1862 when he returned to command his regiment and served in the siege of Knoxville. His regiment returned to Virginia with the rest of the IX Corps and fought at Cold Harbor. He commanded a brigade at the Second Battle of Petersburg. Peirce commanded a brigade during the following time periods: August 18–September 18, 1863; January 10–March 16, 1864; and, June 4–July 23, 1864. Peirce was discharged from the volunteer service on November 4, 1864 due to the loss of his right arm and general nervous debility relating to miasmatic diseases, and returned to Assonet. In 1880, he served one year as a member of the Freetown Board of Selectmen.

Peirce was married in Freetown, Bristol County, Massachusetts on December 13, 1849 to Irene I. Payne until she was granted a divorce from him on May 1, 1875, and the couple had one son living beyond infancy, Palo Alto Peirce, who was many years the town clerk of Freetown. He was elected a life member of the Old Colony Historical Society on April 2, 1855, and a resident member on October 11, 1886. On April 5, 1892, Ebenezer Peirce married Ida E. Gardner, an 1881 graduate of the Bridgewater Normal School. On August 14, 1902, Ebenezer Peirce died at the age of 80. He is buried in the Assonet Burying Ground.

== Legacy ==
Ebenezer Peirce birthplace in Assonet

In 1867, the E. W. Peirce Encampment, Post 8, Grand Army of the Republic was established in Middleborough, Massachusetts and named for Ebenezer W. Peirce.

Peirce was an author of numerous books and articles on historical subjects in Bristol and Plymouth counties, including Indian History, Biography and Genealogy: Pertaining to the Good Sachem Massasoit of the Wampanoag Tribe, and His Descendants, which was published in 1878 by Zerviah Gould Mitchell, a descendant of Sachem Massasoit.

== Peirce vs. Pierce ==
In the Assonet-Lakeville area, there has historically been an inconsistent spelling of the surname Pierce. In some cases, parents with the surname Pierce are shown to have children with the surname Peirce, and vice versa. The most common spelling of this subject's last name seems to be Peirce.

Political offices
Preceded by Henry Peirce	Member of the Freetown Board of Selectmen; 1880; Served alongside: James Winslow, Orsmond F. Braley	Succeeded by George W. Hall
