= John M. Deane =

United States Army Medal of Honor recipient (1840–1914)

- John M. Deane, c. 1902
- Born: January 8, 1840; Assonet, Massachusetts
- Died: September 2, 1914 (aged 74); Assonet, Massachusetts
- Burial place: Assonet Burying Ground
- Military career
- Allegiance: United States of America; Union
- Branch: United States Army; Union Army
- Service years: 1861–1865
- Rank: Major
- Unit: 29th Massachusetts Volunteer Infantry Regiment
- Conflicts: American Civil War
- Awards: Medal of Honor
- Other work: Businessman

John Milton Deane (January 8, 1840 – September 2, 1914) was an American Civil War Medal of Honor recipient and a major in the United States Army.

== Antebellum ==
Deane was born in Assonet, Massachusetts to John and Lydia (Andros) Deane. His maternal grandfather, Thomas Andros, was a veteran of the Revolution. He attended local schools in Assonet and Myricks, and later at the Foxboro English and Classical School. After completing his own schooling, Deane served as a schoolteacher at Berkley Common and at the South School of Assonet Village.

== The Rebellion ==
Through the 1850s, increasing tension between the slave and free states gave a new purpose to the monthly, quarterly, and annual drills and exercises of the various state militias. Since the start of the republic, the bulk of any army during a war was initially expected to be supplied by trained recruits from local, organized militias fleshing out the professional regulars until raw recruits could be trained and equipped if needed. In the decades between the Mexican–American War and the Civil War, the militias were funded and trained by the states. As common with militias at the time, Company Officers were elected to their rank. In Massachusetts, companies of militia were based in various towns and had individual, distinct unit identities as a source of civic pride. As an 18-year-old school teacher, Deane enlisted in Assonet's militia company, the Assonet Light Infantry, in September, 1858. The local companies, as in 1775 were organized as part of a regionally-based regiment. In southeastern Massachusetts, this meant that the Assonets were Company G of the 3rd Regiment, Massachusetts Militia. Annually, the companies would go into an encampment with the parent regiment for drill. He was appointed Sergeant and Company Clerk in August 1860 and elected as the third Lieutenant a month later.

=== Service with the "Minute men of '61" ===
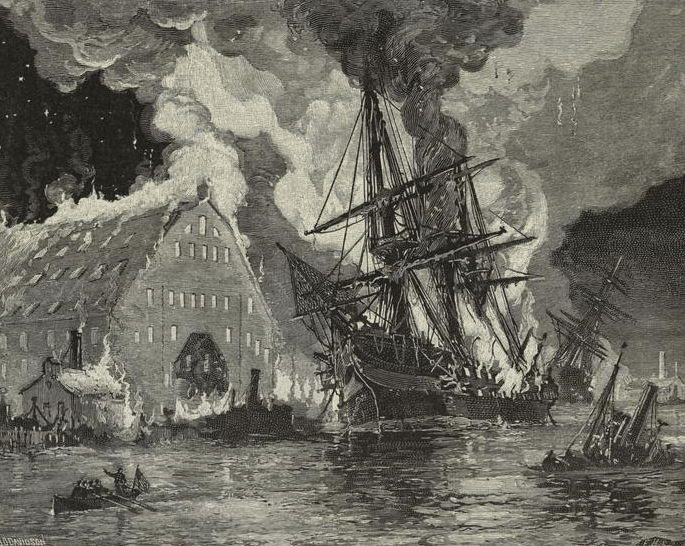
The USS Merrimack burning during the destruction of the Norfolk Navy Yard by Union troops, including the 3rd Massachusetts

The 3rd Massachusetts was organized for active service on April 15, 1861, in response to President Lincoln's call for 75,000 troops to put down the insurrection in the southern states. The Assonet Light Infantry, as Company G, received word to mobilize from its commander, Colonel David W. Wardrop of New Bedford, Massachusetts, during the night of April 15–16. As a member of one of the first Massachusetts regiments to report for service in Boston on April 16, Deane became a member of a group of militia men known as the "Minutemen of '61," in reference to the Minutemen who turned out in April 1775 during the Battles of Lexington and Concord. Commissioned a 2nd Lieutenant upon federal mobilization, Deane and Company G joined the regiment in Boston. The 3rd only had seven out of ten companies required by its table of organization so it added three newly recruited companies of three-year recruits to come up to strength (after the regiment's 90 day obligation expired, these three companies transferred to the 1st Battalion, Massachusetts Volunteers and later the 29th Massachusetts) before sailing from Boston.

Arriving via ship at Fort Monroe in the morning of April 20, 1861, Deane crossed Hampton Roads on board the USS Pawnee to the Gosport Navy Yard. To prevent the expected fall of the yard, its vessels, and valuable stores into Confederate hands, G Companythe 3rd Massachusetts was tasked with setting fire to all buildings, vessels and stores. Although Wardrop felt the 3rd could successfully defend the yard, he was ordered to destroy it. Deane's company and the regiment returned aboard the Pawnee which towed the USS Cumberland to Fortress Monroe, saving the frigate from falling into enemy hands. In executing this assignment, the 3rd Massachusetts claimed that they were the first Union troops to make an incursion on territory held by the Confederacy.

During May and June 1861, the 3rd Massachusetts garrisoned Fort Monroe and conducted occasional patrols beyond the fort. On July 1, the regiment was ordered to occupy Fort Calhoun and the town of Hampton, Virginia just four miles from the Monroe. For a few weeks, Deane commanded the men of Company G acting as the garrison of Fort Calhoun. Confederate forces were massing nearby at Big Bethel and the post was considered a dangerous one due to the proximity of the enemy and the secessionist sentiments of the local population. One soldier of the 3rd Massachusetts was shot and beaten while at Hampton, though he survived.

On July 16, the regiment marched to Fortess Monroe and boarded a steamship for Boston. They were mustered out at Camp Wightman on Long Island in Boston harbor on July 22. Deane again took up teaching at South School.

=== Service with 29th Massachusetts ===
After teaching in Assonet for one school year, Deane was offered and accepted a commission as a 2nd Lieutenant with the 29th Massachusetts Volunteer Infantry Regiment. This assignment was a bit of a reunion as seven of the companies had filled out the 3rd Massachusetts Militia during its service the year prior. Deane joined the regiment at White House Landing on the Pamunkey, a major Army of the Potomac supply base and rail head, just as the 29th Massachusetts was assigned to the Irish Brigade (2nd Brigade, 1st Division, II Corps).

Contemporaries and historians alike have wondered at this unusual assignment. due to the significant social friction in New England between established Protestant families and Irish immigrants. 2LT Deane and the bulk of the 29th Massachusetts were descended, largely, from old-stock English families (like his mother's family), some with heritage dating back to the Mayflower. While the regimental historian observed that the 29th was heartily welcomed to the Irish Brigade, other historians point out the oddity of the "aristocratic 29th Massachusetts ... thrown in with three regiments of New York Irishmen." Historian Daniel Callaghan quotes period sources describing the "unlikely matching of ancient political foes," and the manner in which the men of the 29th tolerated the Irish-born commander of the Irish Brigade, Brig. Gen. Thomas Francis Meagher, "coldly, in a pinched and critical silence."

Deane and his fellow Yankees made it work as the 29th Massachusetts and the rest of the brigade fought well together, earning plaudits for hard campaigning during the Seven Days Battles; most notably at Savage's Station, Glendale, and Malvern Hill. After Malvern Hill, Deane, the 29th, and the rest of the brigade remained at Harrison's Landing while other units were transferred to northern Virginia during the summer of 1862 to fight under Gen. John Pope. After Pope was defeated during the Second Battle of Bull Run on August 30, 1862, the 29th Massachusetts joined the Army of the Potomac south of Washington.

Emboldened by the 2nd Bull Run, Lee invaded Maryland in September 1862. Deane was with the 29th Massachusetts when the two armies met at Sharpsburg, Maryland and fought the Battle of Antietam on September 17, 1862. Deane was with the Irish Brigade in its assault on the "Sunken Road" or "Bloody Lane." The 29th, despite advancing in good order under heavy fire and delivering effective fire in return, did not reach the Sunken Road. The brigade retired, the regimental historian observed, "as steadily as on drill.". The casualties of the 29th were nine killed, 31 wounded and four missing.

After Antietam while in camp in Falmouth in late November, the officers of the 29th learned that Meagher had arranged for a green Irish Brigade flag to be presented to the regiment, recognizing their role as "honorary Irishmen" and their bravery during the Battle of Antietam. Barnes declined the gift because while "proud to receive the flag for the regiment as a token of the respect of their Irish comrades ... it was not an Irish regiment." As a result, on 30 November, Deane and his comrades were transferred over to Brig. Gen. Benjamin C. Christ's brigade in the IX Corps. The originally intended regiment, the 28th Massachusetts, took its place.

The transfer spared the 29th from the Battle of Fredericksburg in which their new brigade played almost no role. Their former comrades in the Irish Brigade, however, made a harrowing charge during the battle and suffered severe casualties. For his performance with the regiment, Deane was promoted to 1st Lieutenant in Falmouth, VA 29 December 1862.

On 5 February 1863, the 29th as part of IX Corps, transferred to the Department of the Ohio and Union operations in Kentucky and east Tennessee. The 29th Massachusetts reached Cincinnati via railroad on March 26, then marched into Kentucky. Deane was appointed Acting Assistant Adjutant General at Paris, Kentucky on 1 April. He remained there through September while the regiment served in Kentucky, Tennessee, and Mississippi.

In September 1863, Deane detached and reported to temporary duty at Draft Rendezvous, Boston Harbor where he helped organize, process, and escort recruits to the fronts. Of note, he escorted the 54th and 55th Massachusetts from Boston to Morris Island, South Carolina in January 1864.

In May 1864, he returned to the 29th in time for the Overland Campaign and the Siege of Petersburg. He was promoted to captain and company command 8 June 1864.

In the pre-dawn hours of June 17, the divisions of the IX Corps formed up for an assault on the entrenched Confederate position outside Petersburg. While other divisions of the IX Corps attacked and were repulsed, the 29th in the 1st Division moved to its assigned position in the late afternoon and received the order to attack. The division, including the 29th, charged from their protected position in a ravine out into an open plain in front of the Confederate entrenchments. According to the regimental historian, "They had scarcely emerged upon the open plain, when the whole crest of the Confederate works was fringed with fire and smoke; grape, canister, and musket balls filled the air.". The 29th was forced to pause in its advance and retired a short distance. The 1st Division of the IX Corps eventually captured the Confederate works in their front, however little had been accomplished by the assault on Petersburg overall. The Confederates remained strongly entrenched and the long Siege of Petersburg began. The 29th, numbering just 100 men at this time, lost six killed and 23 wounded.

Deane and the 29th fought on through the fall of 1864 into the spring of 1865. Throughout this period, Deane served as a company commander and regimental adjutant. Before dawn on March 25, Deane captured and disarmed a Captain of the 4th North Carolina. Despite this incident, Confederate troops achieved complete surprise just before dawn and easily overran Fort Stedman entering the rear sally port almost unchallenged. Major Charles T. Richardson, then in command of the 29th, hearing some light gunfire, ordered the 29th to fall in. No general alarm had yet been raised, but Richardson given Deane's capture of a prisoner, he felt certain that an attack was underway. Within minutes, approximately 500 Confederates, a small part of the overall offensive, swept over Battery 11. The 29th held their ground, however, engaging in heated hand-to-hand combat and eventually capturing 300 Confederates—more than twice their own number. The Confederates still occupied Fort Stedman, however, and soon sent another offensive to occupy Battery 11. This time, the 29th was forced to retreat back to Fort Haskell, the nearest defensible position. In the retreat, Richardson was captured and Dean took command. At Fort Haskell he worked the guns on his pursuers to such an effect as to stop them. He only left the guns to successfully recapture Battery 11. After recapturing Battery 11, Dean captured another Confederate officer, a major in the 4th Georgia who was caught trying to make off with the personal belongings of one of Deane's brother officers.

After four hours, the Confederate attack lost momentum, and their forces began to pull back into Fort Stedman. An overwhelming Union counterattack eventually recaptured the fort. The 29th took part in the counterattack, re-capturing Battery 11. Color-bearer Conrad Homan of the 29th was the first to re-enter Battery 11 and was later awarded the Medal of Honor. The regiment lost 10 killed and an unknown number of captured in this engagement. The 29th was crucial in the victory at the Battle of Fort Stedman on 25 March for which Deane won the Medal of Honor for his conduct. He was also breveted to Major as a result of his gallantry on 25 March.

When the siege ended, the 29th was pulled back to The 29th did not take part in the pursuit of Lee's army during the Appomattox Campaign. The small regiment was instead withdrawn to Washington shortly after Lee's surrender and served as provost guards in the capital. On August 11, 1865, the 29th was mustered out of service.

Deane's service took him to thirteen states, and he traveled thousands of miles. He fought the war as part of the II, V, and IX Corps. He was never sick nor wounded.

== Postbellum Life ==
After discharge he returned to teaching at the South School in Assonet. At the end of the next school year, he left teaching and went into business as a partner in Hathaway & Deane in Fall River in general merchandise.

On November 20, 1866, Deane married Mary Gray Pearce (1846–1923). She was the daughter of Abner Tompkins and Sarah Read (Briggs) Pearce. With Mary, he had three children:

- Milton Irving Deane — 30 April 1868 – 11 February 1952 served in the US Navy during the Spanish-American War
- Richard Boynton Deane — 12 July 1869 – 23 November 1950
- Charles Learned Deane — 25 August 1871 – 9 July 1955
- Anna Louise Andros Deane — 23 July 1877 – 1 October 1957
- Wallis Pearce Deane — 2 May 1881 – 7 August 1949

in 1885, he became involved with the Grand Army of the Republic (GAR), an early veterans' organization, when he joined the Richard Borden Post No. 46 In Fall River. He was very active in veterans' affairs and served the organization as the Post Commander, as various district/departmental/national offices, and as Commander of the Department of Massachusetts in 1897. His wife, Mary was alongside him helping establish the auxiliary of the GAR, the Woman's Relief Corps, at the Richard Borden Post. Like her husband, she was also very active in veterans affairs and relief. Deane was also a companion of the Massachusetts Commandery of the Military Order of the Loyal Legion of the United States.

He was elected a resident member of the Old Colony Historical Society in 1902. In 1896–97, he had erected a home on Water Street in Assonet that is now the Assonet Inn. On September 2, 1914, John Deane died at the age of 74. He is buried in the Assonet Burying Ground. His wife Mary survived him until 11 February 1923 when she passed at age 76.

In 1989, a ceremony was held in the Assonet Burying Ground during which a government marker was placed on Deane's grave. In 2005, Deane's diaries from the period 1861–1865 were published by the Freetown Historical Society as Civil War Diaries of Maj. John M. Deane, Medal of Honor Winner, 1861–1865.

== Medal of Honor citation ==
In a letter dated March 8, 1895, Col. W. F. Ainsworth informed Deane that he had been awarded the Medal of Honor "for most distinguished gallantry in action at Fort Steadman, Virginia, March 25, 1865, in serving with other volunteers, a previously silenced and abandoned gun, mounted en barbette, at Fort Haskell, being exposed to a galling fire from the enemy's sharpshooters."

== See also ==
- List of Medal of Honor recipients
- List of American Civil War Medal of Honor recipients: A–F
- 3rd Massachusetts Volunteer Militia Regiment
- 29th Massachusetts Volunteer Infantry Regiment
- Grand Army of the Republic
