= Freetown, Massachusetts =

Town in Massachusetts, United States

- Town
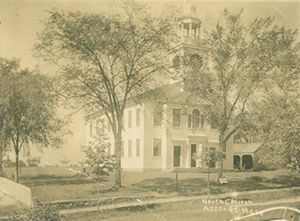
- Historic North Church in Assonet

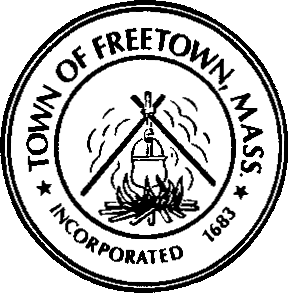
- Seal

- Location in Bristol County in Massachusetts
- Coordinates: 41°46′22″N 71°1′38″W
- Country: United States
- State: Massachusetts
- County: Bristol
- Settled: 1659
- Incorporated: 1683

Government
  - Type: Open town meeting
  - Board of Selectmen: Trevor R. Matthews (2023); Jared Zager (2024); Carlos Lopes (2025)

Area
  - Total: 38.3 sq mi (99.2 km^{2})
  - Land: 36.6 sq mi (94.8 km^{2})
  - Water: 1.7 sq mi (4.4 km^{2})
- Elevation: 160 ft (50 m)

Population (2020)
  - Total: 9,206
  - Density: 252/sq mi (97.1/km^{2})
- Time zone: UTC−5 (Eastern)
  - Summer (DST): UTC−4 (Eastern)
- ZIP Codes: 02702 (Assonet); 02717 (East Freetown)
- Area code: 508/774
- FIPS code: 25-25240
- GNIS feature ID: 0619434
- Website: www.freetownma.gov

Freetown is a town in Bristol County, Massachusetts, United States. The population was 9,206 at the 2020 census.

Freetown is one of the oldest communities in the United States, having been settled by the Pilgrims and their descendants in the latter half of the 17th century. The town once included the city of Fall River (1659–1803), and a portion of Acushnet (1659–1815). The town celebrated its tricentennial in 1983.

Freetown is currently divided into two villages, which historically developed almost entirely independent from one another: Assonet and East Freetown. Freetown lies on an old 18th century road and along old Indian trails from Freetown to Boston. Freetown is home to the Freetown-Fall River State Forest, and Profile Rock and is located approximately 50 miles (80 km) from Boston.

Freetown is a part of the South Coast region of Massachusetts which encompasses the communities that surround Buzzards Bay (excluding the Elizabeth Islands, Bourne and Falmouth), Mount Hope Bay and the Sakonnet River.

Freetown is currently home to two Historic Districts of the National Register of Historic Places: the Assonet Village Historic District, and the East Freetown Historic District.

== History ==
Freetown was first settled by the English on April 2, 1659, on the banks of the Assonet River, when the areas of Assonet and Fall River were purchased for 20 coats, two rugs, two iron pots, two kettles, one little kettle, eight pairs of shoes, six pairs of stockings, one dozen hoes, one dozen hatchets, and two yards of broadcloth from the Wampanoag Indians in an exchange known as Ye Freemen's Purchase. Its population slowly grew, and it existed as a Proprietary settlement of the Plymouth Colony until it was officially incorporated in July 1683. It remained a part of Plymouth Colony until that colony merged with the Massachusetts Bay Colony in 1692. The town was the fifth municipal corporation established in Bristol County.

Throughout the 18th century, the town continued to grow and prosper. In 1747, through the Pocasset Purchase, the village of East Freetown (at the time called "New Freetown") was acquired from Tiverton, Rhode Island (which was being transferred from Massachusetts to Rhode Island). The townspeople fought against the Native Americans in King Philip's War and other local skirmishes. On May 28, 1778, during the Revolutionary War, the Battle of Freetown was fought in a part of the town that is now part of the city of Fall River.

In 1803, Fall River separated from the town, and incorporated as Troy. In 1815, a portion of the town was annexed by Fairhaven, which at the time controlled Acushnet, Massachusetts. That part of East Freetown remains part of Acushnet to this day.

Throughout the 18th, 19th, and early 20th centuries, Freetown served as a very industrious area. Blast furnaces, fishing, textiles, and manufacturing all came to and left Freetown over time.

The population of Freetown remained around or under 2000 residents from the 1700s until 1950, and has expanded nearly fivefold since that time

One of the more well-known industries was N. R. Davis & Sons, a gun manufactory that provided many weapons for the Civil War.

== Geography ==
According to the United States Census Bureau, the town has a total area of 38.3 square miles (99 km^{2}), of which land is 36.6 square miles (95 km^{2}), and 1.7 square miles (4.4 km^{2}) (4.41%) is water. The town is irregularly shaped, and is bordered by Berkley to the northwest, Lakeville to the northeast, Rochester to the east, Acushnet, New Bedford and Dartmouth to the southeast, Fall River to the southwest, and the Taunton River and Somerset to the west.

Within Freetown are various lakes, streams, and rivers. The more prominent are Fall Brook, the Assonet River and Long Pond which the Indians called Lake Apponequet. Also within Freetown are Breakneck Hill and Joshua's Mountain, site of Profile Rock. A vast area of land shared by Freetown and Fall River makes up the Freetown-Fall River State Forest.

== Transportation ==
Freetown is serviced by three exits on Route 24 (the "Fall River Expressway") in Assonet and one exit on Route 140 (the "New Bedford Expressway") in East Freetown. Assonet is also situated on Route 79, and East Freetown is situated on Route 18.

Freetown station in Assonet is served by the Fall River/New Bedford Line of the MBTA Commuter Rail system.

Air transportation is provided locally by smaller aircraft in East Taunton, Berkley, and the regional airport in New Bedford. T.F. Green Airport in Rhode Island is the closest national-service airport, being approximately 35 miles from Assonet. Logan International Airport is approximately fifty miles from the town.

== Government and infrastructure ==
=== Town government ===
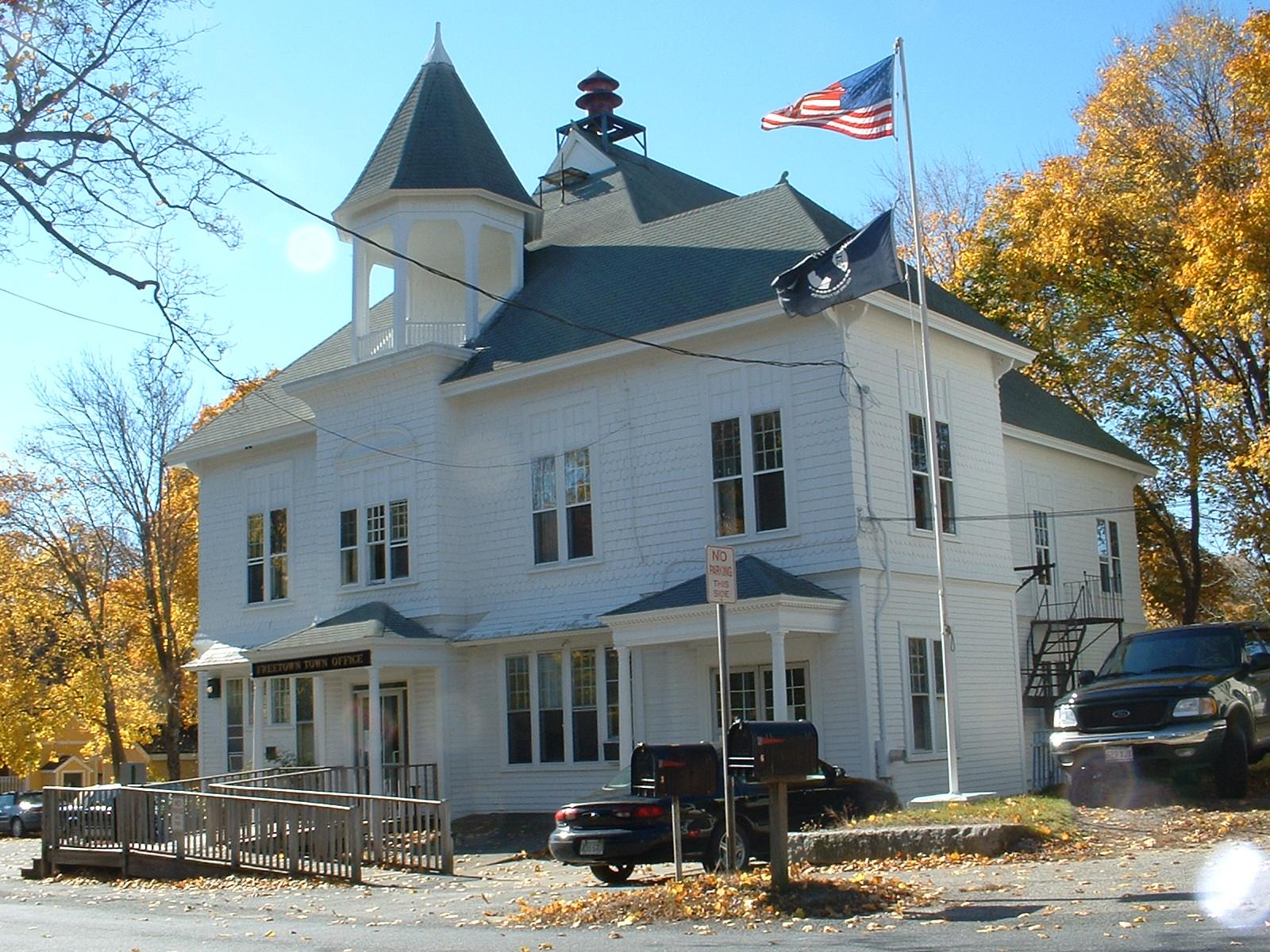
Freetown Town Offices, Assonet

Freetown is governed in the traditional New England style with a Board of Selectmen overseeing day-to-day operations of the town and at least one town meeting per year to handle all major decisions including, but not limited to, budgets, by-laws, and zoning. In 2004, provisions for a Town Administrator were put in place, and in 2007, E. Winn Davis of Falmouth, Massachusetts was hired as the town's first administrator. Mr. Davis announced his retirement in February 2009, and former Middleborough Town Manager John Healey was hired as the interim town administrator in March 2009. He was replaced by former East Providence manager Richard Brown in January 2012, who left on June 30, 2014, with Mr. Healey returning on July 8.

The executive branch of town government is the Board of Selectmen, a popularly elected board made up of three members who are elected for terms of three years. One selectman is up for re-election every year. The current board is Trevor R. Matthews (2023), Jared Zager (2024) and Carlos Lopes (2025).

Selectmen currently serve terms of three years each, and those terms are staggered to ensure that only one member is up for re-election in any given year. Through the 17th, 18th, and 19th centuries, the number of Selectmen was not set in law, and therefore varied, sometimes greatly. In 1988, Barbara Trainor became the first woman to hold the position of Selectman in Freetown, giving the town a record of 305 years of all-male leadership. After her defeat in 1991, no woman was again elected to the board until 2006.

In 2005, attempts to expand the Board of Selectmen to five members failed. Also failing in 2005 was an attempt to limit Selectmen to a total of two terms (or, six years). Attempts to expand the board to five members have been frequent in recent years.

The legislative branch of town government is the town meeting, which in Freetown is an open town meeting.

Various other officers, boards, committees, and commissions round out the variety of services provided to residents, including scattered municipal water, trash collection, fire, ambulance, police, education, recreation, voter registration, etc.

As of the Annual Town Meeting held on May 7, 2007, elections in Freetown are held on the first Monday in April.

==== Seal ====
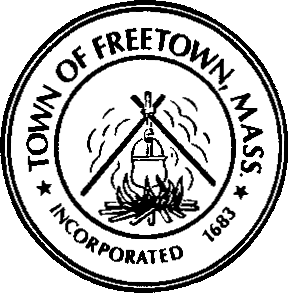

The Seal of the Town of Freetown, Massachusetts is an official device used on documents originating from the town as well as on municipal equipment and buildings. It was devised in 1890 by the chairman of the Board of Selectmen, Col. Silas P. Richmond.

Along the top of the seal are the words "Town of Freetown, Mass." in all capital letters. Before the T in "Town" and after the final S in "Mass." are stars. Along the bottom of the seal are the words "Incorporated 1683" (also in capital letters). The image of a kettle over a cooking fire is meant to invoke Ye Freemen's Purchase, the agreement by which the lands now known as Assonet and Fall River were purchased by the English settlers from the local Wampanoag Indians.

=== County government ===
Freetown is a part of Bristol County, Massachusetts. Where county governments in some states collect taxes or manage schools, these functions are carried out at the municipal level in Massachusetts. However, some minimal county government does still exist; especially in the court system.

The Bristol County Commission is made up of John T. Saunders (D-New Bedford), Paul B. Kitchen (D-Fairhaven) and John R. Mitchell (D-Fall River). The current District Attorney for Bristol County is Thomas M. Quinn III (D-Fall River). The sheriff of Bristol County is Paul Heroux (D-Attleboro).

=== State government ===
As a small town, Freetown is often divided and attached to neighboring cities and towns to form representative districts for the Massachusetts House of Representatives. These divisions are made along precinct lines. The representative for Precinct I, which is in the 6th Bristol District, is Carole Fiola (D-Fall River). The representative for Precincts II and III, which are in the 8th Bristol District, is Paul Schmid (D-Westport).

The town as a whole is represented in the Massachusetts Senate by Michael J. Rodrigues (D-Westport). Freetown is a part of the 1st Bristol and Plymouth District. Likewise, the town as a whole is represented on the Governor's Council by Joseph Ferreira (D-Somerset), councillor for the 1st District.

=== Federal government ===
Freetown is a part of Massachusetts' 4th Congressional District, and is represented in the United States House of Representatives by Jake Auchincloss (D. The town is also represented in the United States Senate by (Class II) Senator Ed Markey (D-Malden) and (Class I) Senator Elizabeth Warren (D-Cambridge).

Freetown presidential election results
Year	Democratic	Republican	Third parties	Total Votes	Margin
2020	45.10% 2,483	52.78% 2,906	2.12% 117	5,506	7.68%
2016	41.26% 2,035	53.71% 2,649	5.03% 248	4,932	12.45%
2012	49.60% 2,318	48.08% 2,247	2.31% 108	4,673	1.52%
2008	50.32% 2,405	46.62% 2,228	3.06% 146	4,779	3.70%
2004	55.26% 2,454	43.64% 1,938	1.10% 49	4,441	11.62%
2000	57.86% 2,297	35.97% 1,428	6.17% 245	3,970	21.89%
1996	56.64% 2,107	26.48% 985	16.88% 628	3,720	30.16%
1992	38.60% 1,584	25.88% 1,062	35.53% 1,458	4,104	3.07%
1988	45.90% 1,600	53.16% 1,853	0.95% 33	3,486	7.26%
1984	39.24% 1,193	60.39% 1,836	0.36% 11	3,040	21.15%
1980	32.18% 968	50.13% 1,508	17.69% 532	3,008	17.95%
1976	56.51% 1,333	39.64% 935	3.86% 91	2,359	16.87%
1972	44.88% 762	54.59% 927	0.53% 9	1,698	9.72%
1968	47.92% 737	47.27% 727	4.81% 74	1,538	0.65%
1964	65.49% 907	34.44% 477	0.07% 1	1,385	31.05%
1960	46.80% 651	52.98% 737	0.22% 3	1,391	6.18%
1956	26.92% 319	73.00% 865	0.08% 1	1,185	46.08%
1952	26.26% 261	73.44% 730	0.30% 3	994	47.18%
1948	31.98% 229	66.34% 475	1.68% 12	716	34.36%
1944	34.33% 240	65.09% 455	0.57% 4	699	30.76%
1940	35.88% 268	63.86% 477	0.27% 2	747	27.98%

=== Infrastructure ===
Typical of the town's nature, there are separate fire stations, post offices and libraries in Assonet & East Freetown. The main police & fire department headquarters building is halfway between the two. The town hall, however, is in Assonet.

Freetown's fire department provides 24-hour ambulance service to the town, and coverage to surrounding communities such as Lakeville. The town is situated between three major cities (Taunton, Fall River, and New Bedford), each with their own hospitals:

- Morton Hospital & Medical Center in Taunton;
- St. Anne's Hospital and Charlton Hospital, both in Fall River; and
- St. Luke's Hospital in New Bedford.

Mental health hospitals in the area include Taunton State Hospital and Bridgewater State Hospital.

Freetown's state highways are patrolled by the Third (Dartmouth) Barracks of Troop D of the Massachusetts State Police.

=== Utilities ===
Municipal water is provided in some portions of Assonet by the City of Fall River, and in some parts of East Freetown by the City of New Bedford. Both villages are billed by the Freetown Water Commission. Sewer is not available in the town, except for a small portion of South Main Street that is serviced by a line running from Fall River for use by the Stop & Shop Supermarket Company's distribution center.

Electricity in Freetown is provided by Eversource, cable television by Comcast, and telephone service by Verizon.

== Education ==
Freetown provides elementary and secondary education to its population, but currently has no post-secondary institutions in the community.

=== Elementary ===
As with most rural areas, Freetown had country schoolhouses dotting its landscape. In each village of the town, these one- and two-room structures served students in grades one through eight. As part of its Post-War improvements, the town constructed an eight-room schoolhouse known as Freetown Elementary School on a tract of land roughly in the geographic center of the town, with the cornerstone laid in 1949 and the school opening in September 1950. That central area now boasts a park with a miniature Fenway Park, the Freetown Police Station, the Freetown Senior Center, and Freetown Fire Department Station 3.

In the mid-1950s, Freetown and Lakeville formed a regional school district (see "Secondary" below). In 1972, the Freetown and Lakeville opened the George R. Austin Middle School, a 5–8 facility which closed in 2002 and was replaced by the Freetown-Lakeville Middle School. GRAMS has recently been converted into an intermediate school to cover grades 4 and 5 for both Freetown and Lakeville students.

=== Secondary ===
High school students from Freetown initially travelled to several area cities and towns, including Fall River, New Bedford, and Dighton. As its agreements with surrounding cities and towns grew thin, the town recognized a need to develop secondary education programs of its own. In 1955, Freetown, Berkley, Carver, Lakeville, and Rochester formed a planning committee for a regional high school. Carver later dropped from the board, and the remaining towns voted. Freetown and Lakeville approved the school, while the others did not. On April 8, 1957, voters in Freetown and Lakeville approved construction of Apponequet Regional High School. Farm land on Howland Road in Lakeville was donated, and the school opened on September 21, 1959, to serve grades 7–12.

Students wishing a vocational education can apply to Bristol-Plymouth Technical High School. Years prior, studentsfrom both Freetown and Lakeville attended Old Colony Regional Vocational Technical High School for grades 9–12. Freetown is not a member of the district and now has an agreement with Bristol-Plymouth Technical High School while Lakeville students still attend Old Colony. Also, because Freetown is a part of Bristol County, high school students may apply for available slots at the Bristol County Agricultural High School.

== Demographics ==
Historical population
Year	Pop.	±%
1688	288	—
1765	1,492	+418.1%
1776	1,901	+27.4%
1790	2,202	+15.8%
1800	2,535	+15.1%
1810	1,878	−25.9%
1820	1,863	−0.8%
1830	1,909	+2.5%
1840	1,772	−7.2%
1850	1,615	−8.9%
1860	1,521	−5.8%
1870	1,372	−9.8%
1880	1,329	−3.1%
1890	1,417	+6.6%
1900	1,394	−1.6%
1910	1,471	+5.5%
1920	1,532	+4.1%
1930	1,656	+8.1%
1940	1,584	−4.3%
1950	2,104	+32.8%
1960	3,039	+44.4%
1970	4,270	+40.5%
1980	7,058	+65.3%
1990	8,522	+20.7%
2000	8,472	−0.6%
2010	8,870	+4.7%
2020	9,206	+3.8%
2023	9,290	+0.9%
Source: United States census records and Population Estimates Program data.

As of the census of 2000, there were 8,472 people, 2,932 households, and 2,389 families residing in the town. The population density was 231.4 inhabitants per square mile (89.34/km^{2}). There were 3,029 housing units at an average density of 82.7 per square mile (31.9/km^{2}). The racial makeup of the town was 96.15% White, 0.72% African American, 0.19% Native American, 0.65% Asian, 0.01% Pacific Islander, 1.09% from other races, and 1.19% from two or more races. Hispanic or Latino of any race were 0.73% of the population.

There were 2,932 households, out of which 36.9% had children under the age of 18 living with them, 70.3% were married couples living together, 8.0% had a female householder with no husband present, and 18.5% were non-families. Of all households, 14.1% were made up of individuals, and 5.2% had someone living alone who was 65 years of age or older. The average household size was 2.85 and the average family size was 3.14.

In the town, the population was spread out, with 24.6% under the age of 18, 7.6% from 18 to 24, 30.2% from 25 to 44, 28.6% from 45 to 64, and 9.1% who were 65 years of age or older. The median age was 38 years. For every 100 females, there were 101.1 males. For every 100 females age 18 and over, there were 97.3 males.

The median income for a household in the town was $68,505.00, and the median income for a family was $72,270.00. Males had a median income of $45,977.00 versus $28,984.00 for females. The per capita income for the town was $24,401.00. About 3.2% of families and 6.3% of the population were below the poverty line, including 3.0% of those under age 18 and 2.3% of those age 65 or over.

== Library ==
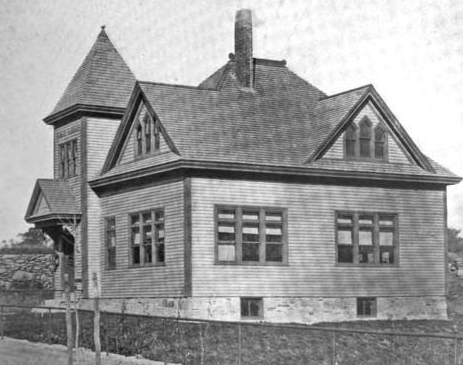
Hathaway Library, Assonet, 1899

Freetown opened its free library December 10, 1892. Today, each side of town features its own library: the Guildford H. Hathaway Public Library, on North Main St. in Assonet, has served the Assonet population since 1895, while the James White Memorial Library, a privately owned, publicly operated library on Washburn Rd. in East Freetown, has served that community's population since 1947. In fiscal year 2008, the town of Freetown spent 0.58% ($113,681) of its budget on its public libraries—approximately $12 per person.

== Culture ==
Both villages in town have strong cultural histories. There are a number of major, annual events such as the Strawberry Festival, held every Father's Day and sponsored by the Tuesday Club of Assonet, the Chicken Barbecue sponsored by the East Freetown Congregational Christian Church, and several events during the Fourth of July, including a parade and a fireworks display over the Assonet River.

== Media ==
Freetown has been served by a number of newspapers over the years, both local and regional. The Weekly Journal, Country Chronicle, Village Voice, and Villager have all been newspapers originating from Freetown and covering, at one point or another, Freetown, Berkley, and Lakeville. News coverage of Freetown has consistently been handled by The New Bedford Standard-Times. Fall River Herald News has covered the town regularly for the last several years, after reducing its coverage in the late 1990s. The Taunton Daily Gazette resumed coverage of Freetown in 2006 after abandoning the town in the 1990s. The Boston Globe also covers Freetown in its GlobeSouth section.

The town's location in southeastern Massachusetts allows it access to a variety of media markets. Each of the major broadcast television networks (NBC, ABC, CBS, and Fox) are represented by two stations: one in the Boston market, and one in the Providence market. Freetown falls in the Providence Designated Market Area. Radios can pick up the Boston, Providence, and Cape Cod stations.

WLWC-TV, the CW affiliate licensed to New Bedford has its transmission tower in East Freetown.

== Sites of interest ==
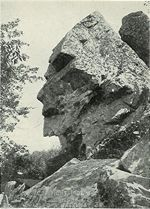
This photo from a 1902 postcard shows Assonet's Profile Rock.

Many of Freetown's sites of interest are derived from its strong history. The Freetown Historical Society Museum in Assonet is a trove of artifacts and information relating to the history of the town and surrounding area, and has an extensive genealogical library. Several buildings on the property show visitors how life in Freetown once was, even a mere sixty years ago, with a one-room schoolhouse, small chapel, blacksmith shop, and the like.

Hathaway Park in Assonet is a public park with a boatramp on the Assonet River. It is the site of the faire and viewing area for the Fourth of July fireworks, and also one of two sites of the Strawberry Festival. The other site for that event is the historic bandstand at the Assonet Four Corners, built in the 1930s on the site of the former Green Dragon Tavern.

Profile Rock, in the Freetown-Fall River State Forest, is a granite outcropping from Joshua's Mountain featuring the image of what local Wampanoag Indians have held to be the face of Massasoit. King Philip's Cave, in East Freetown, is said to have been a hiding place for Metacomet during the King Philip's War.

Porter Pastures in Assonet and Town Beach in East Freetown are both public beaches, the former on Assonet Bay and the latter on Long Pond. There is also a municipal harbor on Long Pond.

== Sports ==
The Freetown Youth Athletic Association, a recently formed joint venture between the Assonet Youth Sports Association and the East Freetown Sports Association, manages a youth baseball program at the town's three baseball complexes: K. R. R. in Assonet, and Central Park and Long Pond in East Freetown.

Lazy A Driving Range is a golf practice facility and driving range located in East Freetown.

== Religion ==
Freetown has historically had Christian and Quaker denominations. Each side of town currently has its own Roman Catholic church, along with a United Church of Christ church in Assonet and a variety of Christian churches in East Freetown. For more information on churches in Assonet and East Freetown, see each village's independent article.

== Notable people ==
One Massachusetts governor, Marcus Morton, has hailed from Freetown. The town has also boasted a number of representatives to the General Court, the state's legislature.

Resident	Residence	Born	Died	Notoriety
William Rounseville Alger		1822	1905	Unitarian minister, author, editor, and abolitionist.
John M. Deane	Assonet	1840	1914	Civil War–era Medal of Honor recipient.
Thomas Gilbert	Assonet	1715	1797	Colonial soldier and Loyalist military leader in the Revolutionary War.
Marcus Morton	East Freetown	1784	1864	Acting Governor of Massachusetts in 1825; governor from 1840 – 1841 and again from 1843 – 1844; namesake of Morton Hospital and Medical Center in Taunton; father of Massachusetts Supreme Judicial Court Chief Justice Marcus Morton.
Ebenezer W. Peirce	Assonet	1822	1902	Civil War military officer.
Dave Rezendes	Assonet	1959		NASCAR driver.
Casey Patrick Tebo	East Freetown	1974		Emmy Award winning filmmaker.

== Books about Freetown ==
- A History of the Town of Freetown, Massachusetts with an Account of the Old Home Festival, July 30, 1902. Assonet Village Improvement Society (1902)
- A Lexicon History of Freetown, Massachusetts. Earl William Rogers, II. (1973).
- Freetown in the Revolution. David T. Sullivan (1974)
- Freetown: A Tri-Centennial Sampler. Earl William Rogers, II and Mark Andrew Ashton (1983)
- Vital Records of the Town of Freetown, Massachusetts, 1686 Through 1890. Helen Gurney Thomas (1988) ISBN 1-55613-136-4
- Civil War Diaries of Major John M. Deane, Medal of Honor Winner, 1861–1865. Freetown Historical Society, Inc. (2005)
- Dark Woods: Cults, Crime and the Paranormal in the Freetown State Forest, Christopher Balzano, Schiffer Books (October 2007)

== See also ==
- Assonet River
- Bridgewater Triangle
