= Profile Rock =

Mountain face in the United States

Coordinates: 41.795613°N 71.0536507°W

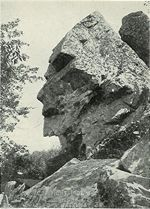
A 1902 postcard photo showing Profile Rock

Profile Rock, 2008

Profile Rock (also known as the Old Man of Joshua's Mountain) was a 50-foot-high (15 m) granite rock formation located in Freetown, Massachusetts, just outside Assonet village and near the Freetown State Forest. In 2019, a large section of the formation broke off.

== History ==
Local Wampanoags believed the rock to be the image of Chief Massasoit. The Wampanoags occupied the region of Rhode Island and Massachusetts bounded by Narragansett Bay to the west and the Atlantic Ocean to the east, and Chief Massasoit was a close friend to the early Pilgrim settlers.

Joshua's Mountain was named after Joshua Tisdale, who was the first to settle near the site. It was privately owned for several years by former Freetown selectman Ben Evans, who sold it to the Commonwealth of Massachusetts to be used as a state park tourist attraction.

On June 19, 2019, at approximately 9:22 a.m., the Freetown Police Department, along with the Freetown Fire Department, responded to the Freetown State Forest “Profile Rock” Park for a report of recent damages to the historic rock formation. First responders and park officials discovered that a large portion of the rock formation had broken off. State forest officials closed the park due to the unsafe environment. The public was encouraged to stay away from the area.

Since at least 2016, the site has been frequently vandalized with graffiti, despite an aggressive cleanup effort by the Bristol County Sheriff's Office. As of July 31, 2023, access to the park was allowed, but the area was unkempt and marred with graffiti.

== See also ==
- List of rock formations that resemble human beings
- Pareidolia
- Cydonia, location of the "Face on Mars"
- Old Man of the Lake
- Old Man of the Mountain
- Mount Pemigewasset
