= Assonet, Massachusetts =

- Town of Freetown
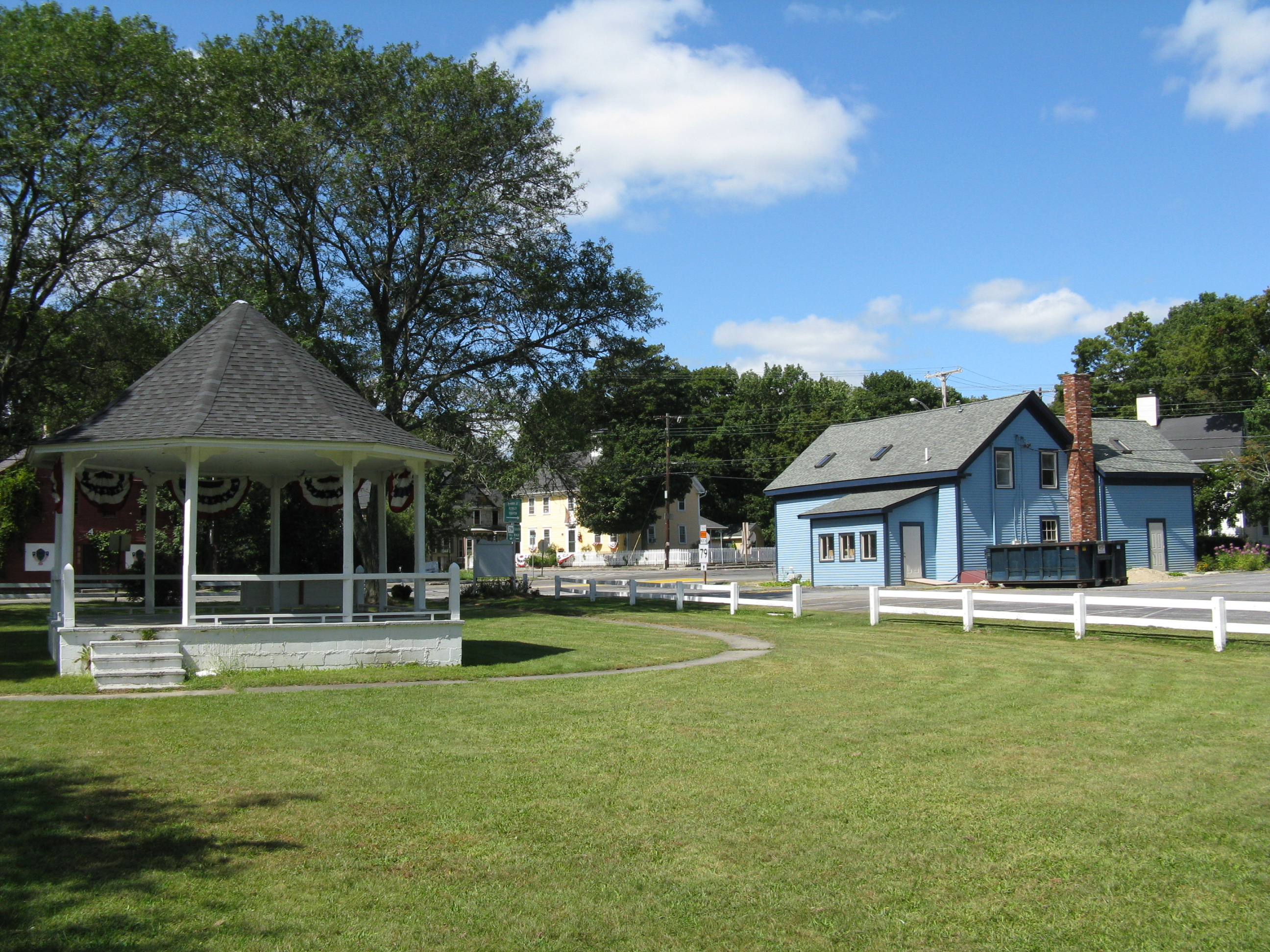
- Assonet Bandstand

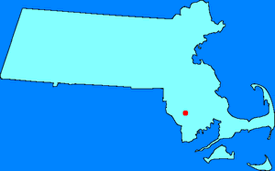
- Location of Assonet in Massachusetts.
- Coordinates: 41°47′31″N 71°05′25″W
- Country: United States
- State: Massachusetts
- County: Bristol County
- Town: Freetown
- Settled: 1659

Population (2000)
  - Total: 4,084
- Time zone: UTC−5 (Eastern Standard)
  - Summer (DST): UTC−4 (Eastern Daylight)
- ZIP Code: 02702
- Area code: 508

Assonet (/əˈsoʊnɪt/ uh-SOH-nit) is one of two villages in the town of Freetown in Bristol County, Massachusetts, United States. An original part of the town, Assonet was settled in 1659 along with the city of Fall River, then a part of Freetown. It rests on the banks of the Assonet River. As of the 2000 census, the village had a total population of 4,084; up from 3,614 in 1990. As of the 2014 census, the village had a total estimated population of 9,093.

== History ==
Assonet was first settled in 1659, shortly after the completion of Ye Freemen's Purchase. It was part of the Plymouth Colony until the 1691 merger with the Massachusetts Bay Colony.

The word comes from the local Wampanoag Indians, who had a settlement in the area, and has two meanings: "place of rocks" and "song of praise". Those meanings are traditional, but the former can be segmented as (h)assun-et where hassun or assin is a word used by southern New England Algonquian to mean stone. The -et is a locative suffix, to give the meaning "at the place of the stone".

The entire region was sold to the English in 1659 by the Wampanoags, but, due to the Algonquian mobile way of life and the splitting and recombining of social units, the Nipmucs may have been subject to or at the time part of the Wampanoags.

The English settlement remained for many years as a small fishing and farming village, growing to be Freetown's more industrious side by the end of the 18th century. By the end of the 19th century, Assonet had begun to slowly return to its origins, having less and less industry in town. At the beginning of the 21st century, the village has once again begun to expand rapidly.

=== 17th century ===
Assonet was settled on April 2, 1659, but a string of wars between English settlers and the local Wampanoag Indians, including King Philip's War, prevented much permanent settlement until later. History shows the area existed as a proprietary settlement as early as 1680, and in 1683 Assonet and Fall River were incorporated as the Town of Freetown, named as such because its settlers were Freemen. The earliest records of the town, from approximately 1680-1685, have been lost. Since then, records have been kept and maintained to trace back the town's legacy. Little development occurred after the incorporation of the town, other than the construction of houses and smaller businesses.

=== 18th century ===
Assonet became a prominent commercial fishing port in Southeastern Massachusetts in the 18th century, best known for its trout. Industry had also begun to develop, including grist mills, sawmills and a blacksmith's shop. As the century progressed, the villagers began to fall under the same strains as the rest of the colonists. Assonet was far enough east that it avoided many of the problems faced during the French and Indian War, but did feature in the Revolutionary War. Skirmishes were fought in Assonet, and the Battle of Freetown was fought on the outskirts of the village in present-day Fall River. The main settled area of the village was known to support the British, even harboring a general before he fled to Newport, Rhode Island.

The white chimneys with black rings on many of the oldest houses are indicative of homes that supported the British. As the 18th century closed, churches and other more prominent buildings began to pop up around the village, including the 1794 construction of Village School, then the office of a Raynham lawyer.

=== 19th century ===
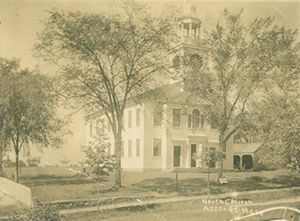
North Church c. 1900.

The 19th century was perhaps the most industrious period in the history of Assonet. The village developed rapidly, with its combination of railroads, ships, its position on the stagecoach and mail routes, and its factories.

The current Route 79 roughly follows the mail and stagecoach route from Rhode Island to Boston, and the Green Dragon Tavern on South Main Street was a popular stopover along the route. The downtown area boasted shipbuilding and was an import/export port, as well as a successful fishing industry.

John M. Deane was a native of Assonet, and a recipient of the Medal of Honor.

The N. R. Davis Gun Manufactory, located near and on a portion of where Hathaway Park now sits, opened and provided many weapons to Union soldiers during the Civil War. Also built was the Crystal Springs Bleachery and Dying Company, which brought millhousing to a small area of the village, and employed many from town and neighboring Fall River, also known for industry.

North Church (1809), Town Hall (1888), and the Guilford H. Hathaway Library (1895) were all constructed in the same small area on Taunton Hill, and complimented the Village School nicely. The Town Hall has served as the municipal office building (1888–present), meeting hall (1888–1976), library (1888–1895), police station (1888–1978), and a variety of other functions. The second floor, literally a hall, was subdivided into office space in the mid-1970s. The Guilford Hathaway Library (b. 1895) served as the town's only library from its construction until the James White Library opened in East Freetown in 1947.

The first Post Office in town opened in Assonet in 1811, and has operated continuously since then, first in a razed building on the corner of Elm and North Main Streets, later in a second razed building, and since 1962 at the facility on South Main Street near the former Assonet Star Market. The ZIP Code for Assonet is 02702.

=== 20th century ===
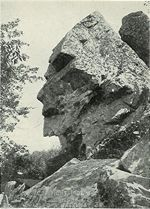
This photo from a 1902 postcard shows Profile Rock, which is said to be the image of Chief Massasoit.

In the mid-20th century, Assonet began to remove itself from the commercial/industrial scene. Most of its mills closed during this period, following the Second World War. The N. R. Davis Gun Factory burned to the ground in 1925; and the Crystal Springs Bleachery, now New England Textile, burned in 1955. (Remnants of the latter can be found by Mill Pond.) The former Monument Manufacturing Company on Mill & Locust Sts. was the largest domestic producer of sleeping bags during World War II. In the postwar period, the majority of villagers sought work outside of town, and farming also came back into common practice. This reverse trend would not last long. By the 1990s, the village began to develop again as the region was seen as a "great escape" for upperclass Boston workers.

Next to the Hathaway Library is a local Verizon station, which is the home of one of the first regional dialing systems. Not far away is Freetown Fire Department Company 1, constructed in 1948.

=== 21st century ===
The Stop & Shop Supermarket Company opened a new 1.3 million square foot (120,000 m^{2}) distribution center on near the site of the Crystal Springs Bleachery after it received a tax increment financing agreement from the town, which has saved the company almost $2 million in property tax as of 2007. They provided over 800 jobs to the region but as of 2005, only 36 of those jobs are held by residents of Freetown. Portions of the village were designated to the National Register of Historic Places.

== Historic District ==
- Assonet Historic District
- U.S. National Register of Historic Places
- U.S. Historic district
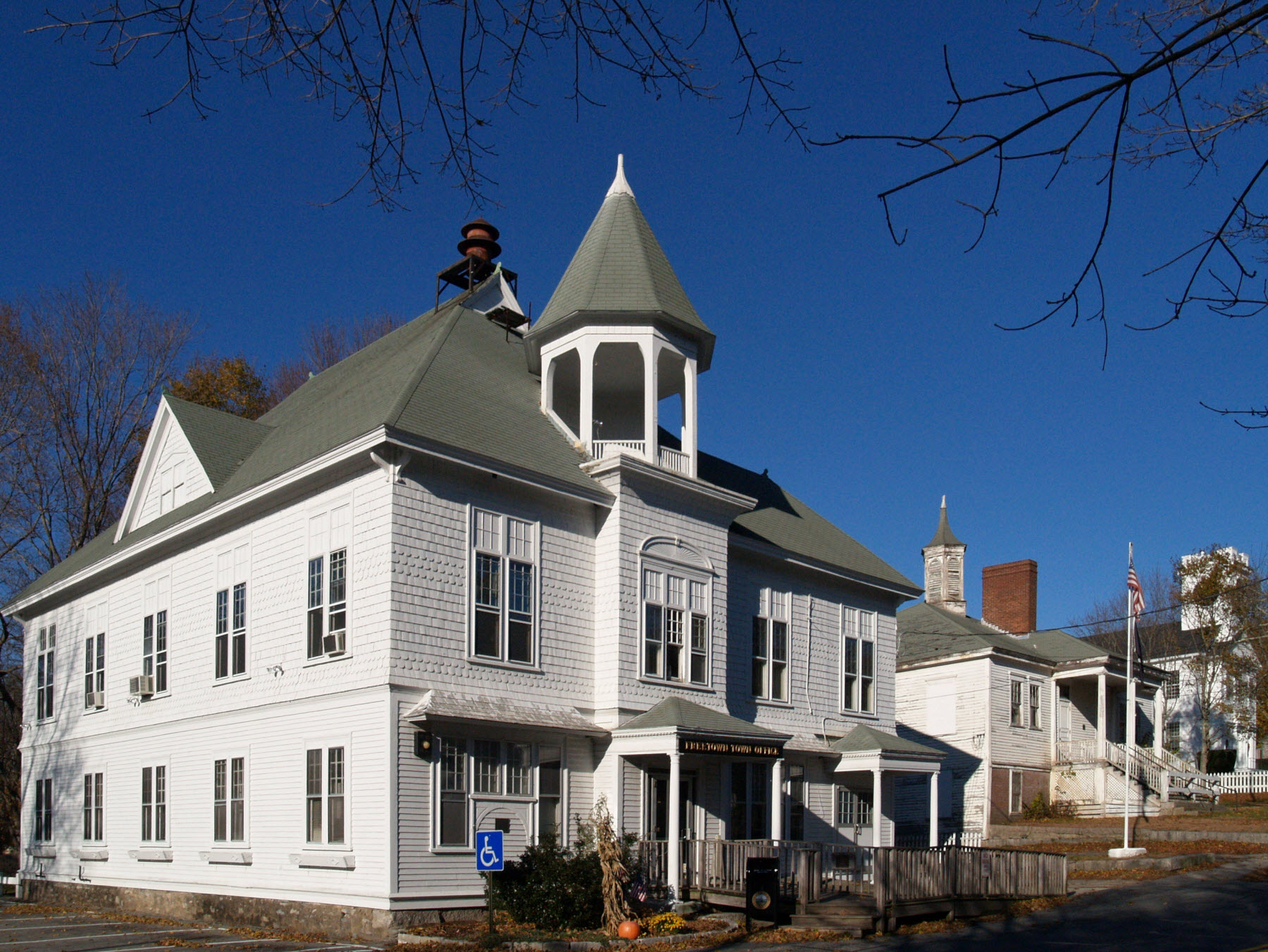
- Town Hall (1888), Village School (1794), and North Church (1809)
- Location: Freetown, Massachusetts
- Coordinates: 41°47′36″N 71°4′12″W
- Architect: Pierce, Ebenezer; Marble, Charles C.
- Architectural style: Colonial, Georgian
- NRHP reference No.: 99001116
- Added to NRHP: September 9, 1999

The Assonet Historic District has been on the National Register of Historic Places since 1999. The boundaries are, roughly, High Street, the railroad tracks, a private road, and Route 24. It contains many buildings of local and widespread historical significance, including the home of United States Secretary of State John Hay's grandfather.

=== Properties ===
- Assonet Burying Ground (c.1800)
- Col. Thomas Gilbert House (c.1700)
- Freetown Town Hall (1888)
- Guilford H. Hathaway Library (1895)
- North Church (1809) (now the United Church of Assonet)
- South Church (c.1835) (now St. Bernard's Church)
- Village School (1794)

== Churches ==
From 1795 to 1809, three Christian churches were founded in Assonet. Additionally, throughout the 17th and 18th centuries, several Quaker meetinghouses were active.

=== Baptist Church ===
The original Baptist Church (1795) was built on the site of South Church. The building suffered a string of misfortune, culminating with it burning following a lightning strike c. 1835. Some of the building was maintained, but arguably most of the building was new as of 1835.

=== South Church ===
South Church (1795/1835) served as the First Christian Church of Assonet steadily until 1916, then again from 1917 to 1922. At this time, it began alternating weekly services with the Congregational Church, from 1922 to 1944. In 1968, the church combined with the Congregational Church to form the United Church of Assonet, and South Church was sold in 1979. A parsonage was built to its left in 1899, and there are cemeteries both across the street from the church, and on the property. Baptisms were originally performed in the Assonet River.

=== North Church ===
North Church (1809) served as the Congregational Church until 1916, when it formed the Federated Church of Assonet. Its on-and-off independence mirrored that of the First Christian Church, except from 1916 to 1917 North Church was the facility utilized. The joining of the two congregations in 1968 fell under the roof of the North Church, which is still used today. The steeple of the church contains a bell cast by Paul Revere. A non-adjacent parsonage still exists further up Taunton Hill as a business.

The church currently belongs to the United Church of Christ. Rev. Gregory N. Baker serves as minister.

=== St. Bernard's Church ===
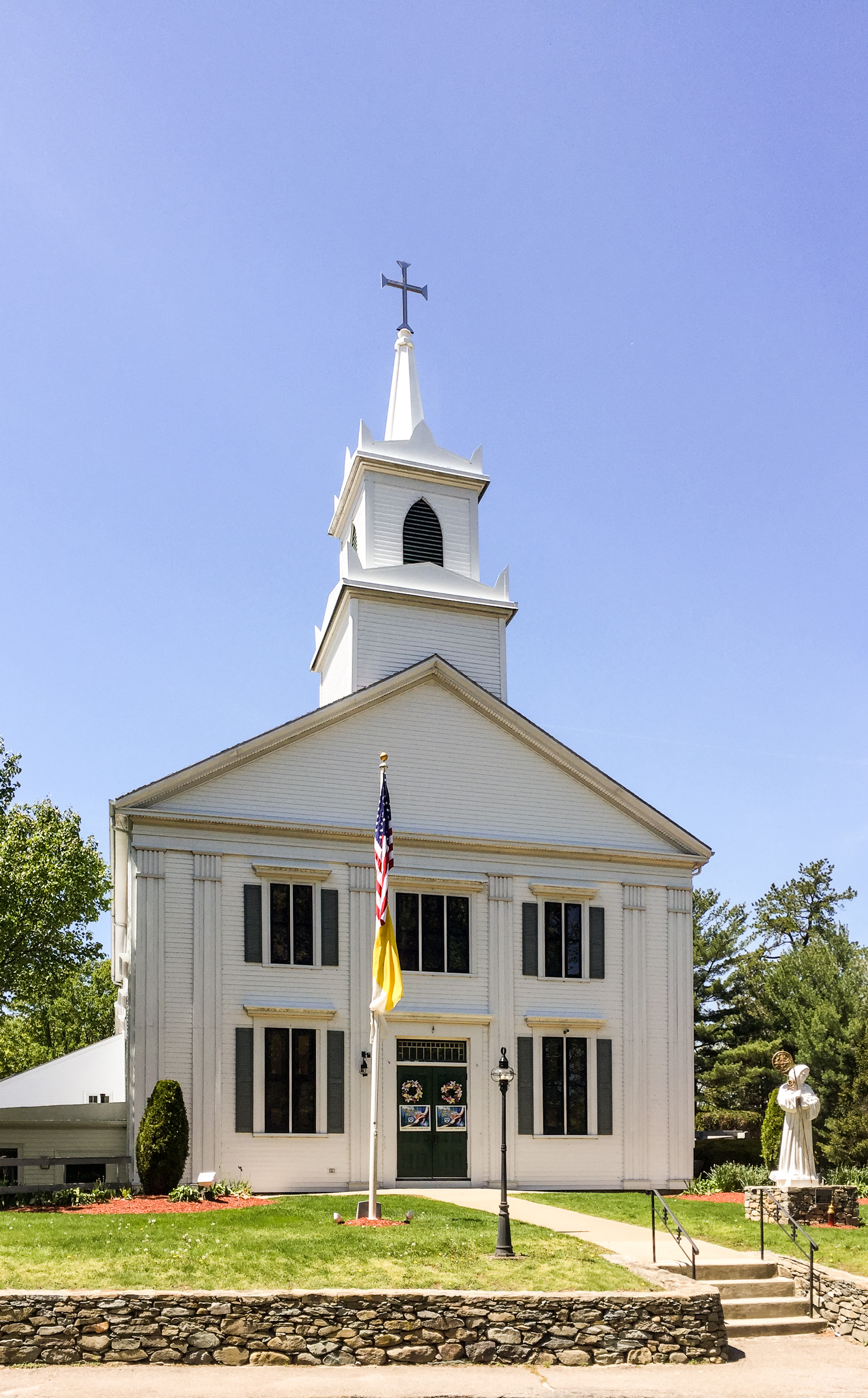
St. Bernard's Church

Roman Catholics did not have a home in Assonet until 1912, when a mission was created. Services were held in private homes until 1937, when St. Bernard's Catholic Church was constructed on the site of Col. Ebeneezer Pierce's home on South Main St. It opened in 1938.

As the congregation grew too large for the small church, St. Bernard's Church was sold and its parishioners moved into South Church, heavily renovated and renamed St. Bernard's Church. St. Bernard's Parish remains in South Church as of 2007, and the parsonage has remained as the rectory.

The former St. Bernard's, which was sold in 1981, has been a string of businesses since then. Most recently, it was a diner, then a Greek restaurant, a martial arts studio, and is now a private residence.

Assonet is part of the Roman Catholic Diocese of Fall River.

== Schools ==
From the early 19th century until 1950, Freetown was serviced by several neighborhood grammar schools, at least three of which existed in Assonet.

=== South School ===
South School, 1869–1950, currently exists at the corner of Copicut Road and South Main Street. It was a three-room schoolhouse used initially for grades 1–8, and later for grades 3–6 and "special class". Grades 3–4 were in one room on the east side and grades 5–6 in one room on the west side of the building. There was one teacher for each room of two grades. Ethel O'Brien was the grades 5–6 teacher in the mid-1940s. There were no bathrooms and the outhouse (since razed) was located at the Northwest corner. A grassy play area was adjacent the grades 3–4 side of the building and Red Rover was played in the street at recess time. Before being abandoned, it spent time as an American Legion hall. It is currently unoccupied, but remains in the possession of the American Legion.

==== Structure ====
It is a one-story, ground-level building with three rooms. There is no discernible cellar. The building is constructed of brick, and is covered in white clapboards. Most of the windows have been removed or boarded over, so an analysis cannot be provided. There were windows on the East and West walls that are no longer visible (2012).

=== Village School ===
Village School, closed in 1950, currently exists on Taunton Hill between the Town Hall and North Church, being the elder of those two buildings by 94 and 15 years, respectively. It began as a lawyer's office in 1794, then became a string of schools. Originally, the minister of North Church served as the schoolmaster. In the 1850s it was a private school, the Assonet Academy. It was purchased by the town circa 1903 and used as a grammar school until 1950 for grades 1-8, and later grades 1 and 2. In the 1940s, grades 1-2 were on the left (South) side and grades 7-8 on the right (North) side of the building. Heat was provided by a pot-bellied wood-burning stove in each room. Mrs. Cudworth was the grades 1-2 teacher and both grades were in the same room; two grades, one teacher. In the 1980s and 1990s, the structure was used for public meetings of municipal committees. Throughout its history, it served as a meeting place for local Boy and Girl Scout troops. Currently, the Town Hall uses it for storage.

==== Structure ====
It is a two-story building, with two rooms on the upper (primary) floor. The lower floor is a two-room cellar, and partially underground. The foundation is brick, and the building itself is wood. The exterior is white clapboards, and the front staircase has a portico and both wooden and iron railings. A cupola adorns the center of the roof, and the windows are six-over-one. The interior of the building is divided in the center, with the wall travelling parallel to School Street between the two front doors. Each room has chalkboards (blackboards) running along the walls, and hanging fixtures from the ceiling provide artificial light when necessary. The building has no plumbing and a woodstove provides heat, with a central brick chimney. An outhouse, now razed, was located at the left rear of the building.

Facing the building from Taunton Hill, the righthand room is painted in bright colors, and was formerly used for meetings of the Girl Scouts and the town's Cultural Council. The lefthand room is panelled in faux stained wood, and was used by the Boy Scouts.

A revitalization effort seeks funds to help restore the ailing structure, which suffers from the effects of weather, rot, deterioration, and a lack of maintenance funds.

=== Forge School ===
The latest in a string of schools known as the Forge School closed in 1940. It functioned irregularly from c.1920 - 1940 and housed grades 7 and 8. The schoolhouse was later converted to a dwelling house, which burned in 2002. It has since been rebuilt, now with dormers. From 1857 to 1862, the Forge School existed in an outbuilding known as the "corn crib" on the property of Daniel Macomber on Forge Road, which was once the site of the oldest dwelling in town, dating back to the 17th century.

=== Today ===
From 1950 on, students have attended the Freetown Elementary School, first for grades 1-8, later K-6, and currently PreK-3. Students then attend the George R. Austin Intermediate School for grades 4-5, and Freetown-Lakeville Middle School for grades 6-8.

For public secondary education, students have three options: Apponequet Regional High School serves students with an academic focus for grades 9-12. Old Colony Regional Vocational Technical High School in Rochester accepts students from Assonet when there are openings, and provides a voc-tech atmosphere. Bristol County Agricultural High School serves students wanting to focus primarily in agricultural and animal studies.

In addition, there are a variety of Catholic high schools in the area.

== Geography ==
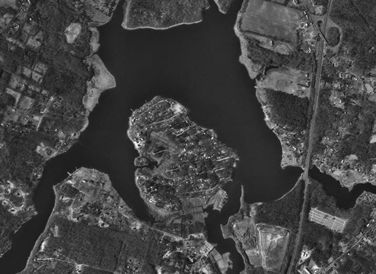
USGS aerial photo of the Assonet River, Assonet Bay, and Assonet Bay Shores.

Assonet is located in Southeastern Massachusetts. It is bounded by Fall River, Berkley, Lakeville, East Freetown, and the Assonet River. It has a hilly terrain, with many outcroppings of bedrock. One such outcropping is the famous Profile Rock, a rock said to resemble the profile of Wampanoag Indian chief Massasoit. Maple, elm, oak, pine, and birch trees are common throughout. Numerous streams and brooks flow through the village, as does the Assonet River.

Bodies of water include Assonet Bay and Mill Pond. Bryant's Neck, also called Assonet Bay Shores, is a large peninsula situated between Shephard's Cove and Assonet proper on Assonet Bay. This area is also well known for its salt marshes. The area around Mill Pond is frequented for its herring runs.

A large section of the village comprises approximately one third of the Freetown-Fall River State Forest.

== Gallery ==
Col. Thomas Gilbert House

Ebenezer Peirce Estate (razed 1938)

== See also ==
- National Register of Historic Places listings in Bristol County, Massachusetts
