= Assonet River =

River in Bristol County, Massachusetts, United States

Coordinates: 41.7969°N 71.0653°W

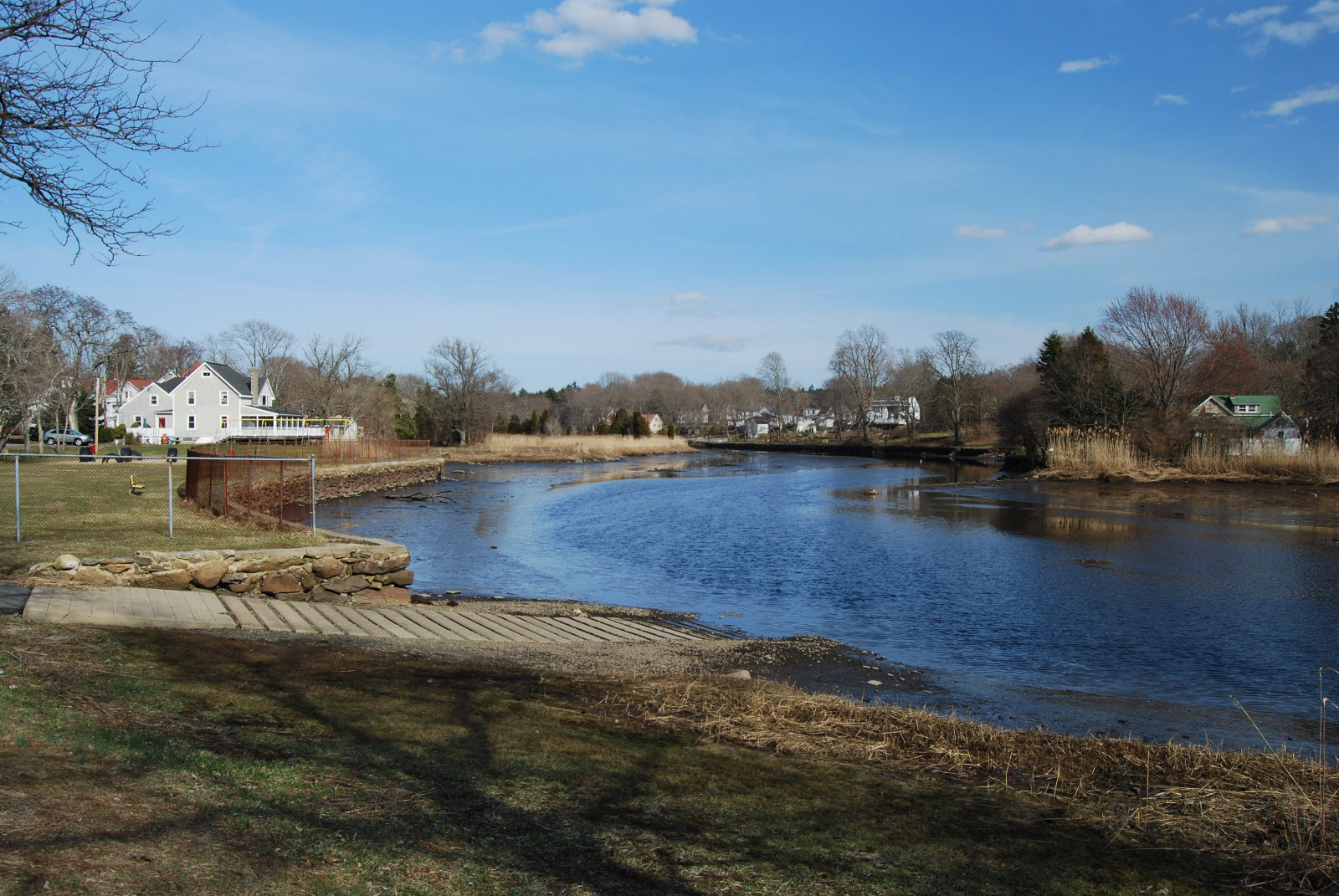
View of Assonet River at the east end of Assonet Bay

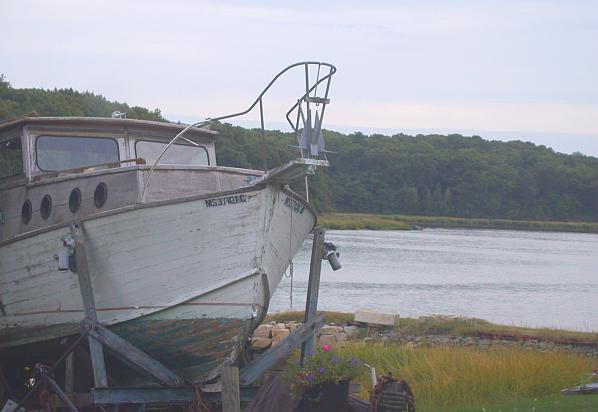
The Assonet River, northeast of Fall River

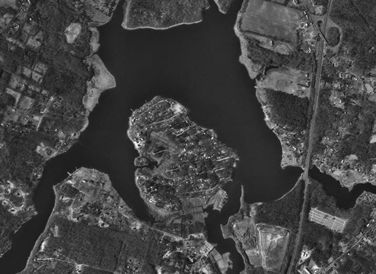
USGS aerial photo of the Assonet River, Assonet Bay, and Assonet Bay Shores.

The Assonet River is located in Bristol County, Massachusetts. It flows 7.4 miles (11.9 km) in a westerly direction through Freetown and joins the Taunton River near Assonet Neck in Berkley, Massachusetts.

== Description ==
The Assonet River is formed from the Cedar Swamp River near the border of Freetown and Lakeville just south of Myricks village. It is joined by Quaker Brook at Forge Pond. From this point it flows parallel to Route 79 through a series of small mill ponds. It becomes tidal near the Elm Street Bridge in Assonet village where it widens and becomes Assonet Bay to the west of Route 24.

Assonet Bay contains several small coves fed by small streams including Payne's Cove (fed by Terry Brook from the south) and Shepherd's Cove located at its southwest end. The bay is also fed by Stacy's Creek from the north. Assonet Bay is surrounded by several small hills (drumlins). Past Shepherd's Cove the Assonet River narrows again for its last mile or so before joining the wide Taunton River between Conspiracy Island and Winslow Point. This portion of the river forms the town line between Berkley and Freetown.

At its mouth, the Assonet River also forms Hathaway Cove in Assonet.

== History ==
The Assonet River is a major river of southeastern Massachusetts, along with the Taunton River. Throughout the history of colonial and early America, the river and its tributaries provided the power to run grist mills and saw mills, and later the Crystal Springs Bleachery. It provided for a minor port, and is also a prime location for herring runs.

During the 18th century, the river played a part in the American Revolutionary War. British ships travelled both it and the Taunton River when fighting in the colonies. Such attacks led to the Battle of Freetown, as well as the burning of river-centered rural settlement.

During the 19th century, fishing and cargo ships regularly used the Assonet River to reach their home port of Assonet, Massachusetts. From these ports on Water Street and South Main Street were delivered products such as food, dairy, lobster, fish, lumber, and for a span of time guns. The N. R. Davis Gun Factory, located on Water Street adjacent to the river, supplied many weapons to forces in the Civil War.

In the 20th century, the river continued to see its share of action, but only briefly. The last ship to sail from Assonet set out in 1902. Small bootlegging operations used the river sporadically. The Green Dragon Tavern was torn down in the 1930s, and the Town of Freetown constructed its bandstand on the riverside site, providing a wonderful greenspace. The gun factory burned in 1925, and the bleachery followed suit in 1955, essentially bringing the commercial life of the river to a close.

Assonet Bay Shores, a former summer community, is a peninsula formed by Assonet Bay, Payne Cove, and Shepherd's Cove. It was first settled early in Assonet's history, with this major development following in the early 1960s. Across Shepherd's Cove is an abundance of higher-end homes, proving that the river has found new life as a beautiful backdrop for rural life.

== See also ==
- List of crossings of the Assonet River
- List of Massachusetts rivers
- Taunton River Watershed
