= Apponequet Regional High School =

Public school in Massachusetts, United States of America

Location
- 100 Howland Road; Lakeville, Plymouth County, Massachusetts 02347; United States of America
- 41°47′33″N 70°58′58″W

Information
- Type: Public; Coeducational; Open enrollment
- Motto: Achievement, Resilience, Honor, Self-Advocacy
- Established: 1957
- School board: Freetown-Lakeville Regional School Committee
- School district: Freetown-Lakeville Public Schools
- Principal: Kahlan Dessert
- Faculty: 60
- Teaching staff: 61.33 (FTE)
- Grades: 9-12
- Enrollment: 683 (2023–2024)
- Student to teacher ratio: 11.14
- Classes offered: General / Secondary Education
- Language: English
- Campus type: Rural
- Colors: Navy Blue, White & Red
- Song: Alma Mater
- Athletics: MIAA - Division 3
- Athletics conference: South Coast Conference
- Mascot: Laker
- Team name: Lakers
- Rival: Old Rochester Regional High School
- Accreditation: The New England Association of Schools & Colleges
- National ranking: 1364
- SAT average: Total-1130 Evidence-Based Reading and Writing-570 Math-580 (2018)
- Publication: Alembic
- Newspaper: Laker Pride
- Yearbook: Polarion
- Communities served: Freetown, Acushnet, Lakeville

Apponequet Regional High School (informally known as Apponequet or ARHS), located at 100 Howland Road in Lakeville, Massachusetts opened September 21, 1959. Apponequet serves secondary academic education students from the towns of Freetown, and Lakeville. It is the only high school within the Freetown-Lakeville Regional School District.

== History ==
In the early 20th century many small towns in Massachusetts sent their older students to other cities' or towns' high schools on a tuition basis to avoid the cost of building and maintaining their own secondary facility. As towns with high schools grew, they became unable to provide tuition spaces, needing the space for their own students. This created the need for more high schools, as tuition contracts slowly began to expire and not be renewed.

The communities of Freetown, Berkley, Carver, Lakeville, and Rochester, Massachusetts formed a planning committee for a regional high school, as each town needed a location for its secondary school students. Carver dropped from the board in 1955 after forming a region with Plymouth, and the remaining towns voted. Freetown and Lakeville approved the school, while Berkley and Rochester did not. Berkley would go on to form a tuition agreement with Somerset, and Rochester formed a region with Marion and Mattapoisett (Old Rochester Regional).

On April 8, 1957, town meetings were held in Freetown and Lakeville on the issue of the two towns building and operating a high school together. The vote in Freetown was 140–22 in favor, and in Lakeville 160–90, also in favor.

Freetown appropriated $20,347 for the preliminary planning of the school, and Lakeville appropriated $18,152 as its share. Land for the school was given by Paul Leonard and Frank Mello on Howland Road in Lakeville. On September 10, 1957, Israel T. Almy, a Fall River architect used for the original Freetown Consolidated Elementary School, was selected as the architect for the school. Charles Sawyer was chosen to be the first principal for the school.

Apponequet Regional Jr./Sr. High School opened on September 21, 1959, with an initial enrollment of 610 students in grades 7 through 12, including students from Freetown and Lakeville and school choice students from Taunton, Berkley, Fall River and New Bedford The facility originally housed a vocational school, the Apponequet Regional Vocational High School, in addition to the current academic program. Apponequet's vocational program admitted students in grades 9–12. Phased out in the early 1990s in favor of sending students to Old Colony Regional Vocational Technical High School in Rochester, the vocational program at Apponequet remains in several independent living classes.

With the building of the former George R. Austin Middle School in 1972, Apponequet became a senior-only high school, enrolling grades 9–12 in both the academic and vocational schools.

Major additions and renovations were completed in 1972 (8 classrooms), 1989 (9 classrooms, a new Library/Media Center, and a TV studio/choir room) and 2000 (two classrooms, an Art Room, a Lecture Hall/choir room, and extensive renovations throughout the building). The 2000 renovation was noted for the destruction of many murals throughout the building that had been designed by students in the late 1980s and early 1990s.

As of the 2025-26 academic year, the administration consists of Principal Kahlan Dessert, and Assistant Principals Jeffrey Gallant and Nicholas Pilla.

== Academics ==
Apponequet Regional High School currently has an enrollment of approximately 800 students in grades 9–12. The school's 83% graduation rate is lower than the Massachusetts state average of 86%. Apponequet provides currently 16 Advanced Placement classes that are offered to all students.

Two foreign languages are taught: Spanish & Portuguese.

Apponequet also participates in the Virtual High School for students.

=== Advanced Placement ===
Apponequet Regional High School offers Advanced Placement courses in English Literature and Composition, English Language and Composition, European History, United States History, Psychology, Calculus, Biology, Physics, Environmental Science, Chemistry, Spanish, Seminar and Research. Students may also access AP courses through VHS.

A total of 354 Advanced Placement exams were administered to 200 students in May, 2018. Overall, 55% of all students in grades 11 and 12 took at least one AP exam, and 76% of the exams administered received scores of “3” or above. Students scored above state averages in 10 subject areas.

=== National Honor Society ===
The honor roll is composed of students who have met high academic achievement standards. It is created when report cards are issued. There are three categories of academic honors: Highest Honors - no grade lower than an A High Honors - no grade lower than an A− Honors - no grade lower than a B.

Selection for Membership: A student who has achieved an academic average of 3.6 at the conclusion of his/her second or third year of study at ARHS is eligible for membership in the National Honor Society. The student will be notified in writing of his/her eligibility and will be invited to complete an application for admission. The application, reviewed by the National Honor Society Advisory Council, will provide the council with documentation of the student's leadership skills, high moral character and participation in at least 10 hours of school and community service.

=== Virtual High School ===
Virtual High School is an on-line/distance learning opportunity. Through VHS, students enroll in unique courses not traditionally available at ARHS. Students may earn up to 2.5 credits per semester or up to 5 credits per year and may choose from a catalog of semester and yearlong courses, including Honors, College Preparatory, and Advanced Placement. VHS classes take place entirely over the Internet and mirror the format of college courses. The structure of VHS courses requires productivity, initiative, and self-direction from students who will be entirely accountable and responsible for their own learning. Students enrolled in VHS report to the Library or another assigned space to attend class. However, students can complete their work at any time during the week, as long as work is posted by specified due dates. A site coordinator is available for assistance and distribution of materials and progress reports. Students are chosen on a first come first served basis with preference given to seniors and juniors. Students may not enroll in any VHS course that is currently being taught at ARHS. VHS courses count toward a student's GPA and class rank. VHS courses also count toward fulfillment of the graduation requirements.

=== Graduation Requirements ===
All students in the Class of 2019 are required to earn 110 credits as well as earn a Competency Determination through participation in MCAS testing in order to graduate. All students in the Class of 2020 are required to earn 115 credits as well as earn a Competency Determination through participation in MCAS testing in order to graduate. All students in the Classes of 2021 and 2022 are required to earn 120 credits as well as earn a Competency Determination through participation in the Next Generation MCAS testing in order to graduate. In order to earn a Competency Determination, all students must score above a 240 on English Language Arts and Math MCAS exams or successfully complete an Educational Proficiency Plan (EPP) if their scores range between 220 and 238. In addition, all students must pass a Science MCAS with a score of 220 or better. Students in the Class of 2021 will be subject to any scoring requirements associated with the Next Generation MCAS.

== Accreditation ==
Apponequet Regional High School is accredited by the New England Association of Schools and Colleges, a non-governmental, nationally recognized organization whose affiliated institutions include elementary schools through collegiate institutions offering post-graduate instruction.

== Demographics ==
As of the 2024-25 school year, the enrollment at Apponequet is 700+. Of those students, enrollment by Race/Ethnicity is as follows: African American 2.2%, Asian 1.6%, Hispanic 5.1%, Native American 0.3%, White 88.7%, Native Hawaiian, Pacific Islander 0.3%, Multi-Race, Non-Hispanic 1.8%.

== Sports ==
Apponequet offers a variety of sports. Sports for the fall season consist of football, field hockey, golf, soccer, volleyball, cross country, and cheerleading. In the winter ice hockey, basketball, indoor track, and swimming are offered. Spring sports consist of baseball, softball, lacrosse, tennis, and outdoor track.

Apponequet's mascot is the Lakers. The word 'Apponequet' refers to the native tribe that resided within the local area surrounding the school. Previously, the image used as the Laker mascot consisted of a Red Indian chief and spear. These images were featured on the sports uniforms and clothing relating to the Lakers athletics. However, this was replaced in recent times due to controversy over Native American mascots.

In the mid-to-late 1960s the school belonged to the South Shore League. It later removed itself to the Mayflower League for the 1970s and early 1980s, and finally joined the South Coast Conference upon its founding in 1986. The 2000 renovation, noted above, also updated the athletic complex, including the football field (Griffith Field), the gymnasium, several Baseball fields, a Softball field, six Tennis courts, and provisions for Soccer, Field Hockey and Ultimate Frisbee venues.

=== Swimming and Diving ===
The school boasts a Southern Conference Championship girls swim team and a separate two-time Southern Conference Championship boys swim team (2013 and 2014), both coached by Brett Pacheco. The girls and boys teams combined into a co-ed swim team in 2014 when they joined the South Coast Conference. Both teams went on to claim the South Coast Conference Championship titles in both 2015 and 2016. The boys swim team has remained undefeated in conference dual swim meets for the past four consecutive years (2013–2016). The swim teams practice at the George R. Austin Intermediate School pool.

=== Football ===
The school's traditional Thanksgiving Day football rival is Old Rochester Regional High School in Mattapoisett.

Home games feature cheerleaders, the marching band, and majorettes. Each group has their own performance during half time.

The football team has won the South Coast Conference Championship 5 times - 1997, 2001, 2004, 2008, 2010.

In 2008, the football team completed an undefeated regular season (11-0), won its first outright SCC Championship, and earned a spot in the EMass D-IIA Playoffs for the first time. Unfortunately, Apponequet was defeated in the first round by powerhouse Duxbury by a score of 31–13.

=== Cheerleading ===
The cheerleading squad is made up of students in grades 9 through 12.

In 2007 the Apponequet Cheerleading Squad was featured on the MTV reality show MADE.

=== Lacrosse ===
The school hosts both a boy's and girl's lacrosse team made of grades 8 through 12.

Before the 2025-2026 season, they did not yet have a grade 8 program.

== Extracurricular activities ==
Apponequet offers a variety of extracurricular activities aside from sports. These include Art, Share, Travel Club, Band and Choir, DECA, Diversity Coalition, Drama Club, Engineering Club, Environmental Club, HOSA, GSA, Majorettes, Math Team, Game Club, Student Council, and E-Sports.

=== Band ===
Apponequet instrumental ensembles consist of a concert band, jazz band, and a marching band. The bands are under the direction of Ed Ledwith. Each year students from Apponequet's band audition for various festivals put on by Massachusetts Music Educators Association and the Southeastern Massachusetts School Bandmasters Association. Apponequet's marching band performs each year at home football games with a halftime performance and in various local holiday parades. The concert band performs a winter and spring concert each year, as well as making other musical appearances.

==== Jazz Band ====
Jazz Ensemble is a performing group that rehearses one evening per week. Students learn how to perform music in various jazz styles, and practice their improvisation skills. The Jazz Ensemble performs at ARHS concerts and competition festivals, as well as local events.

=== Choir ===
Apponequet has five choral groups. One is the general concert choir, which is led by Ed Ledwith. There are also three select choral groups.

On July 12, 2007, the Apponequet Summersing choir performed both "The Star-Spangled Banner" and "O Canada" at Fenway Park for a Boston Red Sox game versus the Toronto Blue Jays.

=== DECA ===
DECA is an international association of high school marketing students. Generally considered the best club at Apponequet, there are over 200 members, and they compete every year in state and regional contests. Mr. Frank Rosa and Mrs. Cronin lead the club.

=== Drama ===
Two productions are completed each school year. In the fall a play is performed and in the spring, a musical.

=== Environmental Club ===
The Environmental Club is a volunteer organization of students interested in environmental issues.

=== Majorettes ===
High School Band Majorettes participate in football games, band shows, pep rallies, parades, and other band activities. Majorettes are selected to the squad on the basis of their ability in the areas of twirling, marching, poise, and bearing, and grades. Auditions are held at the beginning of the school year. The Apponequet Majorettes competition teams also partake in competitions in the New England Majorettes Association (NEMA) against Middleboro, Seekonk, Brockton, and previously Somerset-Berkley as well as other surrounding and local schools. Majorettes are selected to squads Novice, B, A, or Open on the basis of their ability in twirling, marching, poise, and skill set.

=== Math Team ===
The Math Team is a competitive organization which is open to all students who demonstrate a proficiency and interest in mathematics. The team competes in the Southeastern Massachusetts Conference Math League which consists of 20 teams. There are four league meets, held once every 5 weeks from October through February, with a playoff meet in March and the State meet in April. Practice sessions are held once a week throughout the year. In addition, members have the opportunity to compete for scholarships via the Annual Worcester Polytech Math Contest, the Olympiad, and the American High School Math Exam.

=== E-Sports ===
The E-Sports club was started in 2025, and has a Fortnite team and an Overwatch team. The 2025 Fortnite Team, composed of Devin Antonya and Greg Francis, were the champions of the United States Northeast Regional League, and ranked #2 overall in the Northeast.

=== Student Council ===
Apponequet participates in the Massachusetts Association of Student Councils (MASC) as well as The Southeastern Massachusetts Association of Student Councils (SEMASC). The Student Council is in charge of various events, like Homecoming, Apponecon: Apponequet's Game Night, Field Day, The Bonanza, Pep Rally, Senior Lock In, Spirit Weeks, Turkey Bingo, and Dude Be Nice Week. Student council is generally considered the best club at Apponequet Regional High School, second only to DECA.

== Post Graduation ==
Graduates receive a high school diploma. Many graduates continue their education at any college, university, or technical school. There were 187 students in the 2018 senior class. Approximately 90-95% of these students continued on to higher education. The Class of 2018 sent 62% of its members to four-year colleges and 30% to two-year colleges and trade schools.

== Notable alumni ==
- Stephen R. Canessa - (1998) Massachusetts State Representative.
- Mikayla Nogueira - influencer
- Casey Tebo - Television Film and Music Video Director, most notably for his work with Steven Tyler and other musicians.
