= Scott Dragos =

American football player (born 1975)

No. 85, 45
- Positions: Fullback, tight end

Personal information
- Born: October 28, 1975 (age 51); Rochester, Massachusetts, U.S.
- Listed height: 6 ft 2 in (1.88 m)
- Listed weight: 245 lb (111 kg)

Career information
- High school: Old Rochester Regional (Mattapoisett, Massachusetts)
- College: Boston College
- NFL draft: 1998: undrafted

Career history
- New England Patriots (1998)*; New York Giants (1998-1999)*; Barcelona Dragons (1999); Chicago Bears (1999–2001); New England Patriots (2002)*
- * Offseason or practice squad member only

Career NFL statistics
- Receptions: 4
- Receiving yards: 28
- Stats at Pro Football Reference

Scott Dragos (born October 28, 1975) is an American former professional football player who was a fullback and tight end in the National Football League (NFL). After playing college football for the Boston College Eagles, he played in the NFL for the Chicago Bears in 2000–2001.

== Early life ==
Dragos attended Old Rochester Regional High School, which serves the towns of Marion, Mattapoisett, and Rochester, Massachusetts.

== College career ==
Dragos attended and played college football for Boston College from 1994 to 1997.

== Professional career ==
=== First stint with Patriots ===
After going undrafted in the 1998 NFL draft, Dragos was signed by the New England Patriots on April 24, 1998, but was released on August 19, 1998.

=== New York Giants ===
One day later after released by the Patriots, the Giants signed Dragos on the practice squad

=== Chicago Bears ===
After released by the Giants, the Bears signed Dragos on practice squad on September 28, 1999. He was elevated to their active roster on October 10, 2000, and made his NFL debut on October 15, 2000, in a 28–16 loss to the Minnesota Vikings. Dragos Caught first career reception against the Buffalo Bills on November 12, 2000. Dragos gaining four yards ... Grabbed two catches for 14 yards in win against the New England Patriots on December 10, 2000. One of Dragos' catches was against Hall of Fame cornerback Ty Law and led to one of the most iconic NFL photos of the decade. Dragos started season-finale against the Detroit Lions.

In 2001 Dragos played six games.

=== Second stint with Patriots ===
Dragos signed with the Patriots on March 12, 2002. On August 25, 2002, Dragos was released by Patriots.

== Personal life ==
Scott was born in Montville, New Jersey to Stephen and Carolynne Dragos. He moved to Rochester Massachusetts when he was in elementary school after spending a year with his family in Wickford RI. Dragos is a Vice Chairman at CBRE and co-heads the CBRE Boston office. He resides in Winchester, MA with his wife Marta and 3 children Jaxon, Andie & Troy.
