= Carver Middle High School =

Public school in Massachusetts, United States

Coordinates: 41.8936°N 70.7557°W

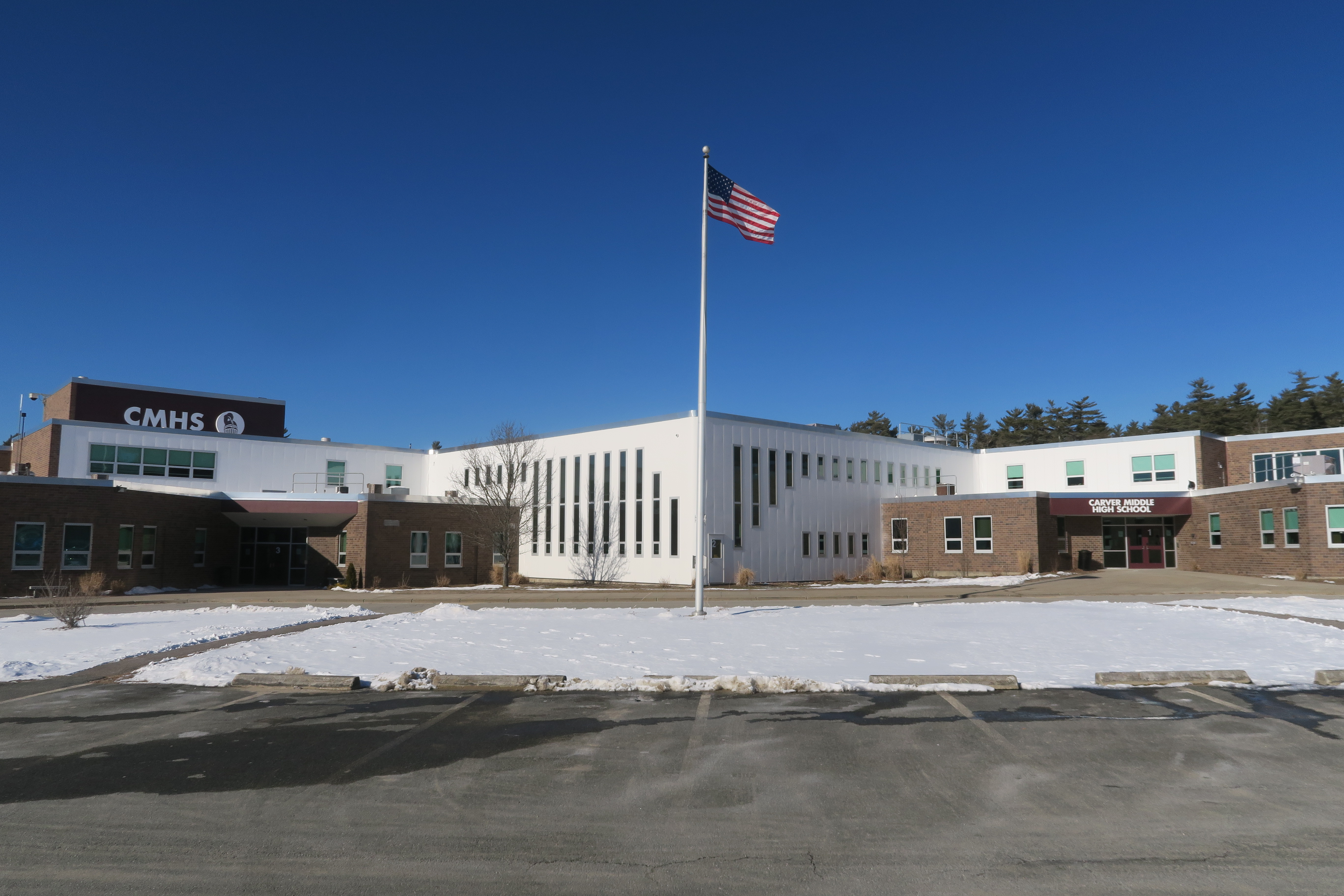
- 60 South Meadow Road, Carver, Massachusetts 02330; FOR GPS USE: Crusader Drive, Carver, Massachusetts 02330; United States

Information
- Type: Public; Open enrollment
- Established: 1988; Renamed: 2009
- Principal: Christine Cabral
- Grades: 6–12
- Enrollment: 713 (2023-2024)
- Hours in school day: 7:25 A.M. - 2:25 P.M.
- Campus type: Rural
- Colors: Maroon, Gray, & White
- Athletics: MIAA - Division 3 & 4
- Athletics conference: South Shore League
- Mascot: Crusaders
- Rivals: Middleborough, Apponequet
- Newspaper: (9–12) The Crusader Times
- Website: Carver Middle High School website

Carver Middle High School is a public school located in Carver, Massachusetts, United States. This school was formerly two different schools, Carver Middle School (6–8) and Carver High School (9–12) in one building with both schools sharing the library and auditorium. The school became under one principal in 2008–09 school year. This school became officially Carver Middle High School the following school year. It is located at 60 South Meadow Rd. and has an enrollment of 489 students in grades 6–8, and 537 students in grades 9–12. The school's mascot is the Crusaders and the school colors are Maroon and Silver/Gray. The principal is Christine Cabral.

== District ==
Students enter Carver Middle High School at 6th grade from Carver Elementary School. Most students graduate and leave from the 12th grade here.

=== Other schools ===
Eighth grade students may apply to a private school, Norfolk County Agricultural High School, Bristol County Agricultural High School, or Old Colony Regional Vocational Technical High School for high school. Students must apply and may be interviewed.

=== Transportation ===
Carver has its own school buses. They have 15 bus routes, plus other routes to Special Needs schools, and to Agricultural.

==== Transportation to other schools ====
Students going to Old Colony Regional Vocational Technical High School take a school bus provided by Old Colony, meanwhile students going to Norfolk County Agricultural High School or Bristol County Agricultural High School take a bus provided by the town.

==== Payment ====
For the past few years Carver has had the money to pay for the buses, starting in 2004 for grades 10 and above. Grades 9 and below are always paid for by the town.

== Athletics ==
Carver is well known for its wrestling and girls basketball program. Carver competes in the South Shore League. Christopher Carbone is the interim director of the athletic program at CMHS.

In 2000, the football team made their first appearance in the MIAA Division 4B State Championship, but were ultimately defeated by powerhouse Fairhaven. In 2023, the football team made their second appearance in the MIAA State Championship, but lost to defending state champions, West Boylston.

The baseball team advanced to the state championship in 1999, but were defeated by Northbridge by a score of 6-2.

=== Intramurals ===
Since no sports are offered in grades 6–7, grade 8 is allowed to partake in High School Sports, students can participate in intramural sports. A one-time payment must be made and a medical form must be turned in.

== Notable alumni ==
- Mike Bennett, professional wrestler currently working in AEW & ROH
