= Nasketucket Bay State Reservation =

Protected area in Massachusetts, US

- Location within Massachusetts Location within the United States
- Location: Mattapoisett, Massachusetts, United States
- Coordinates: 41°38′7.2″N 70°50′13.1″W
- Area: 210 acres (85 ha)
- Established: 1999
- Administrator: Massachusetts Department of Conservation and Recreation
- Website: Official website

Nasketucket Bay State Reservation, managed by the Massachusetts Department of Conservation and Recreation, is located in Mattapoisett, Massachusetts, along the coastline of southeast Massachusetts. The park includes 210 acres (85 ha) of rocky shoreline, open field and wooded trails. A parking lot is located at the northeast corner of the reservation.

The reservation is accessed by Route 6, to Brandt Island Road to Brandt Beach Road. A parking lot is located at the northeast corner of the reservation and a trail leads circuitously south to the rocky beach at the bay. Before becoming a reservation, the land was going to be developed into house lots. The main trail loosely follows the original property owner’s driveway, and was cleared by the developers. The clearings intended for some of the houses are still visible. Nature has taken hold since, and now presents some very nice walking trails. Off-road vehicles are not permitted.
