= Mike Bennett (wrestler) =

American professional wrestler (born 1985)

- Bennett at Death Before Dishonor 2026

Personal information
- Born: Michael Bennett; May 16, 1985 (age 41) Carver, Massachusetts, U.S.
- Spouse: Maria Kanellis (m. 2014)
- Children: 3

Professional wrestling career
- Ring name(s): Michael Bennett; Mike Bennett; Mike Kanellis
- Billed height: 5 ft 11 in (180 cm)
- Billed weight: 224 lb (102 kg)
- Billed from: South Boston, Massachusetts; Boston, Massachusetts
- Trained by: Bob Evans; Steve Bradley
- Debut: 2002

Michael Bennett (born May 16, 1985) is an American professional wrestler. He is signed to Ring of Honor (ROH), where he performs under his real name and is one-half of The Kingdom with Matthew Taven. He is also known for his time with WWE, where he performed under the ring name Mike Kanellis.

After beginning his career on the independent circuit, Bennett made his ROH debut in 2008. With his then-girlfriend Maria Kanellis, he worked as part of "The Kingdom" stable, winning the ROH World Tag Team Championship with Matt Taven. ROH's talent-sharing agreement with New Japan Pro-Wrestling (NJPW) saw the tag team make appearances in Japan, where they won NJPW's IWGP Tag Team Championship. Bennett left ROH in late-2015 to sign with promotion Total Nonstop Action Wrestling (TNA), where he won the TNA X Division Championship. In 2017, Bennett joined his wife Maria in WWE (whose maiden name was used as his character's surname), where he held the WWE 24/7 Championship twice. After leaving WWE in April 2020, Bennett briefly returned to ROH and to TNA (now known as Impact Wrestling) before joining AEW in October 2022.

In addition to wrestling, Bennett and Taven operated a wrestling school in West Warwick, Rhode Island.

== Early life ==
Michael Bennett was born on May 16, 1985, in Carver, Massachusetts. He has an older brother, an older sister, and a younger brother. He graduated from Carver High School in 2003 (presently, Carver Middle-High School).

== Professional wrestling career ==
=== Independent circuit (2002–2017) ===
Bennett made his professional wrestling debut in 2002. The following year, Bennett made a single appearance for the East Coast Wrestling Association, when he lost to Big Benny. On October 3, 2004, at the New England Wrestling Association's Return to Exile show, Bennett was part of a battle royal in which the final two competitors would face each other for the vacant NEWA Heavyweight Championship. Bennett and Brian Rogers were the final men left, and later that night Bennett defeated Rogers to win the NEWA Heavyweight Championship. Bennett also wrestled for Eastern Pro Wrestling (EPW). On April 27, 2007, Bennett lost to Derek Destiny. On February 29, 2008, Bennett lost to Nick Westgate. The following day, Bennett, who was accompanied by Gia Savitz, defeated Thom Kane. On January 16, 2010, Bennett unsuccessfully challenged Nick Westagte for the EPW Television Championship. On March 5, Bennett won the 'Rhodes Island Rumble' battle royal to become the number one contender to the EPW Heavyweight Championship.

Bennett and Bryce Andrews appeared on the April 9, 2007, episode of WWE Heat, where they faced Cryme Tyme. On October 6, 2009, Bennett competed in dark match in losing effort against Kip James at the TNA Impact! taping. In a match for the Northeast Wrestling (NEW) promotion in March 2010, Bennett was a participant in a five-way match for the NEW Heavyweight Championship, which was won by Matt Taven. At NEW's Spring Slam show on April 15, 2011, Bennett lost to Matt Hardy. In 2010, Bennett debuted for Squared Circle Wrestling (2CW) by defeating Matt Taven on September 25. Three months later at 2CW's Nightmare Before Christmas show in December, Taven defeated Bennett in a rematch.

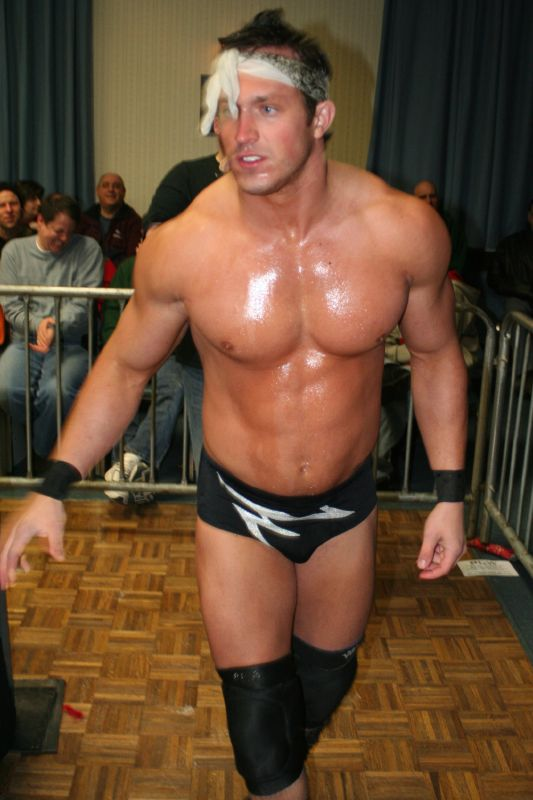
Bennett in 2009

On September 14, 2012, Bennett made his debut for the Chikara promotion, when he and The Young Bucks (Matt Jackson and Nick Jackson) entered the 2012 King of Trios tournament as Team ROH, defeating the Faces of Pain (The Barbarian, Meng and The Warlord) in their first round match. The following day, Team ROH advanced to the semifinals with a win over The Extreme Trio (Jerry Lynn, Tommy Dreamer and Too Cold Scorpio). Team ROH opened the third and final day of the tournament by defeating the all-female Team Sendai Girls (Dash Chisako, Meiko Satomura and Sendai Sachiko) in the semifinals. In the finals of the tournament, Team ROH was defeated by the Spectral Envoy (Frightmare, Hallowicked and UltraMantis Black), when Bennett submitted to Hallowicked's Chikara Special.

=== New England Championship Wrestling (2003–2005; 2009–2010) ===
Bennett debuted for New England Championship Wrestling (NECW) on November 14, 2003, losing to Johnny Idol. The following March, Bennett earned his first win in NECW by defeating Bob Evans. In August 2004, Bennett began feuding with Ru Starr, trading victories with him, until Starr won the rubber match on February 12, 2005. In March, Bennett moved into a feud with Michael Sain, losing to him in two singles match that month, and again in a Stretcher match on April 16. He earned his first victory over Sain in June. He spent the next several months wrestling against competitors including Frankie Arion, Pat Masters, and Fergal Devitt, before taking a four-year hiatus from NECW.

He returned at Spring Breakdown on April 18, 2009, teaming with Guy Alexander to defeat TJ Richter and Mr. Munroe. At NECW Tag Team Classic in September, Bennett and Alexander defeated Richter and Munroe in the first round of a tournament, but their match against Scott Osborne and Brandon Locke ended in a double countout, eliminating both teams from the tournament. At the NECW television tapings on January 23, 2010, Bennett defeated David Cash.

=== Top Rope Promotions (2006–2014) ===
Bennett debuted for Top Rope Promotions (TRP) on February 17, 2006, where he defeated Stryker. On March 24, Bennett, as part of NRG, defeated Freightrain. The following month Bennett defeated Billy Warhawk. Bennett continued on a winning streak, defeating Joe Chece, Spike Dudley, D. C. Drake, and on June 23, he competed in the 2006 Kowalski Cup. He defeated Romeo Roselli and Chece en route to the final, where he defeated Slyck Wagner Brown to win the tournament. He suffered his first loss on July 1, when he was defeated by Antonio Thomas, and two weeks later he lost to Roselli. On September 1, Bennett defeated Dudley in a street fight to win the NRG Heavyweight Championship. The following night, he lost to Dudley in a steel cage match, and lost a Loser Leaves Town steel cage match to Dudley on September 29.

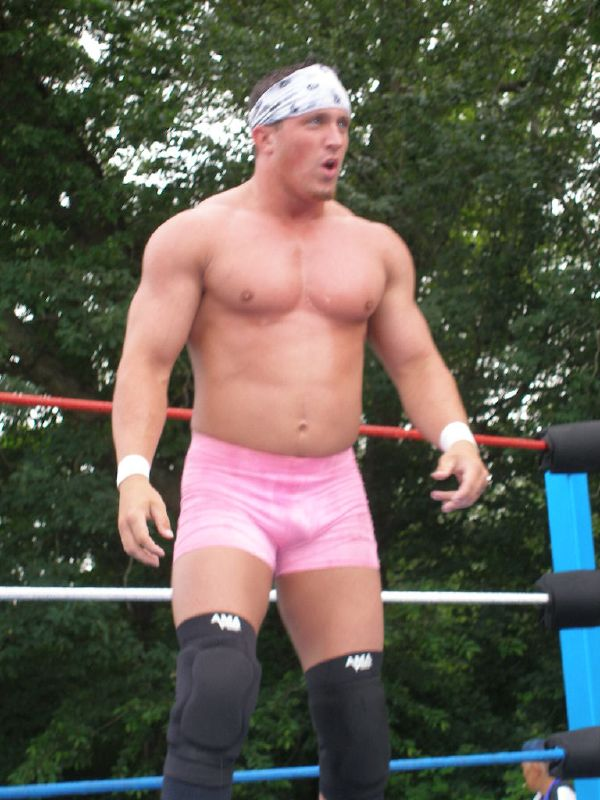
Bennett at a Top Rope Promotions event in July 2007

Despite this, Bennett returned to TRP on January 5, 2007, teaming with Bryce Andrews to defeat 'Chunky But Funky' to win the TRP Tag Team Championship. After losing to The Aldren Brothers in a non-title match in February, Bennett and Andrews won a two out of three falls match to retain the championship on April 6. The following night, they lost to The Heart Throbs (Antonio Thomas and Romeo Roselli) in a non-title match, and at the following show in May, Bennett lost to Roselli in a singles match. On June 9, Bennett and Andrews defeated Kristian Frost and Brutus Beefcake. In July, Bennett aligned himself with Luscious Latasha, with the pair defeating Dudley and Leah Morrison in a mixed tag team match on July 15. In April 2008, Bennett lost to Dudley in a street fight. On May 30, Bennett lost to Andrews in a First Blood match. He continued competing in TRP for the remainder of the year, wrestling against Dudley, Brian Fury, Bushwhacker Luke, and Jason Blade. He formed a semi-regular tag team with Ryan Waters in January 2009, and the pair lost to the reigning TRP Tag Team Championship, The Alden Brothers on January 9.

On March 20, Bennett faced Stevie Richards in a match for the vacant TRP Heavyweight Championship, but was unsuccessful. On April 4, however, Bennett defeated Richards to win the TRP Heavyweight Championship for the first time. He successfully defended the championship against Jimmy Preston on July 12, Isys Ephex on September 18, and Ken Anderson on November 8. On January 1, 2010, Bennett defeated Kenny Dykstra to retain his TRP Heavyweight Championship, and retained it again against Colin Delaney on February 5, and against J. Freddie in a No Disqualification match on February 21. On April 9, at The Anniversary, the TRP Heavyweight Championship was vacated when a match between Bennett and Freddie ended in a no contest. The following month, Freddie defeated Bennett in a Last Man Standing match.

At the 2010 Kowalski Cup Tournament, Bennett defeated TRP Interstate Champion Guy Alexander in a non-title match, provoking a feud between the two. In November, Bennett defeated Alexander in a strap match, with Ox Baker as the guest enforcer. At Spindle City Rumble in December, Bennett defeated Alexander by count-out, and so did not win the championship. On January 1, 2011, Bennett lost to Alexander in a steel cage match for the Interstate Championship. On February 19, Bennett debuted "Brutal" Bob Evans as his manager in TRP, and went on to defeat Frankie Arion.

=== Ring of Honor (2008–2015) ===
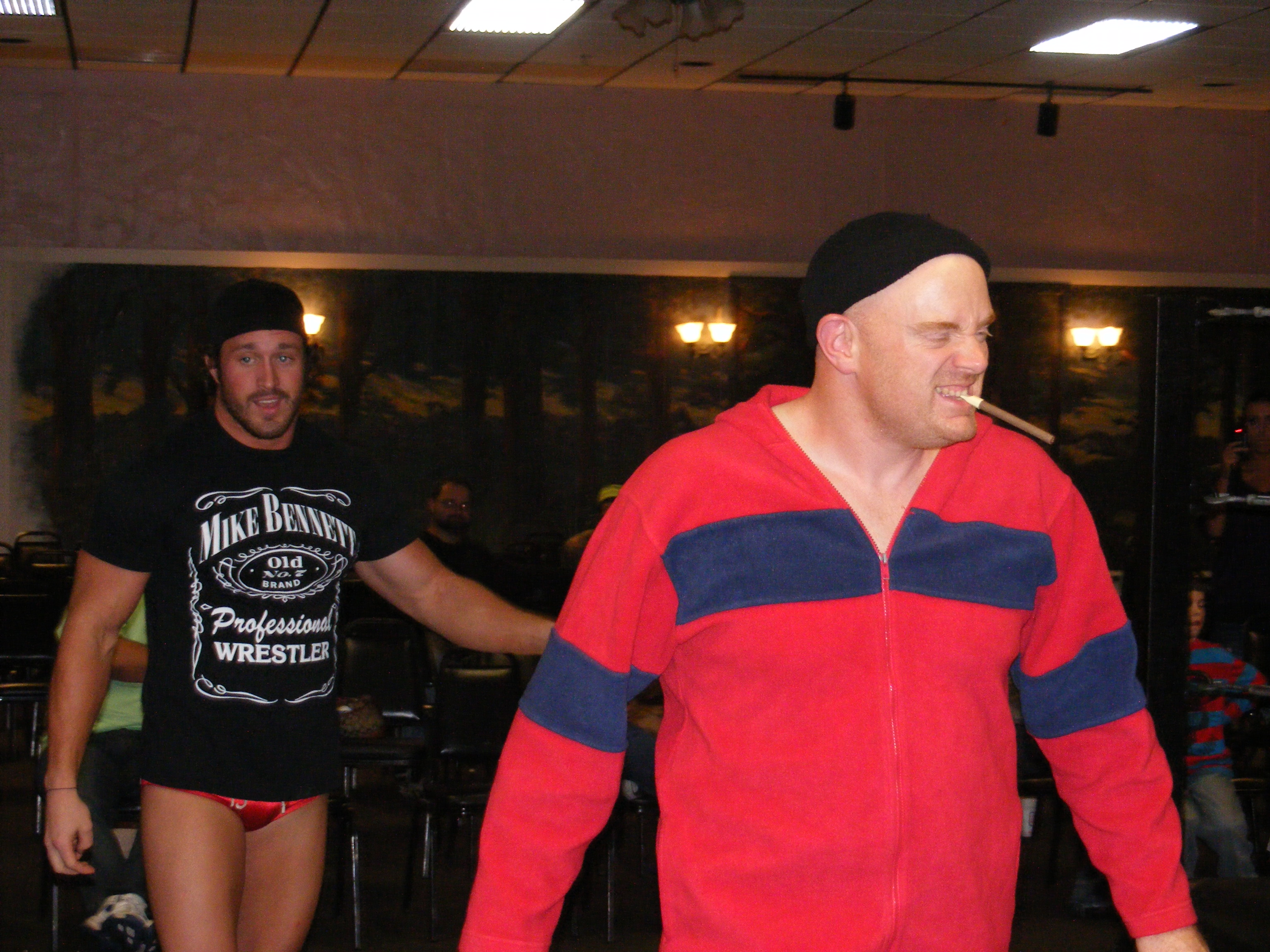
Bennett (left) with his manager and trainer "Brutal" Bob Evans in October 2011

Bennett made his Ring of Honor (ROH) debut in 2008. In his first match he lost to Daniel Puder at Proving Ground in Boston, Massachusetts on January 11. His next appearance came three months later at Bedlam In Beantown in March, when he lost to Jason Blade. After attending a tryout camp in March 2010, which he heard about through announcer Kevin Kelly, Bennett appeared at the Ring of Honor Wrestling television tapings in July and August. Bennett signed a one-year contract with ROH in August 2010. In his next appearance he lost to Roderick Strong on September 10, but earned his first ROH victory at Tag Title Classic II on December 17, when he defeated Colt Cabana.

Video packages about Bennett began airing on ROH's television program, Ring of Honor Wrestling in November 2010, promoting his television debut. On the December 6 episode of Ring of Honor Wrestling, Bennett and his manager "Brutal" Bob Evans appeared in the crowd to watch a match between the ROH World Television Champion Eddie Edwards and Christopher Daniels. Bennett made his in-ring television debut when he defeated Nick Dinsmore on the January 10, 2010, episode. During the February and March episodes of Ring of Honor Wrestling, Bennett took part in the "Top Prospect Tournament". He defeated Adam Cole in the first round, Andy Ridge in the semi-finals, and Kyle O'Reilly in the final. Following each match in the tournament, Bennett was congratulated and given advice by Steve Corino, but Bennett rejected it and mocked Corino, provoking a feud between the two men. At the 9th Anniversary Show pay-per-view, Bennett pinned Corino to win a four-corner survival match, also involving Kyle O'Reilly and Grizzly Redwood. As a result of his victory in the 'Top Prospect Tournament', Bennett earned a match for the ROH World Television Championship against Christopher Daniels at Defy or Deny on March 18. Bennett and Evans had a verbal confrontation with Corino at the start of the show, and Corino prevented Evans from helping Bennett during his ROH World Television Championship match, which Bennett went on to lose. In a singles match between the two at Manhattan Mayhem IV, Bennett defeated Corino and attacked him following the match with the aid of Evans. In a rematch at Revolution: Canada in early May, Bennett again prevailed with Evans' help.

Bennett received another shot at the ROH World Television Championship on October 1, but the title match with Jay Lethal ended in a fifteen-minute time limit draw. Shortly after this, he began an angle where he proclaimed that he had already won the match and proclaimed himself to be the true champion. Bennett challenged for the World Television Championship again at Final Battle 2011 in a three-way elimination match against Lethal and El Generico. Bennett was accompanied by his real-life girlfriend Maria Kanellis for the match, in which he was the final man eliminated, allowing Lethal to retain the championship. At the January 7, 2012, tapings of Ring of Honor Wrestling, Bennett unsuccessfully challenged Lethal for the World Television Championship in a No Time Limit match. Bennett then started feuding with Lance Storm, with Bennett winning their initial singles match at Showdown in the Sun, and Storm winning the rematch at Border Wars. At the June 29 tapings of Ring of Honor Wrestling, Bennett defeated Storm in the final match of their trilogy.

At the June 21 tapings of Ring of Honor Wrestling, Bennett teamed up with Brutal Bob in a tag team match, where they were defeated by Adam Cole and Eddie Edwards. Afterwards Bennett, Bob, and Kanellis attacked Cole and Edwards, before being chased away by the returning Sara Del Rey. At the following internet pay-per-view, Boiling Point on August 11, Bennett and Kanellis were defeated in an intergender tag team match by Edwards and Del Rey, when Bennett submitted to Edwards. On December 16 at Final Battle 2012: Doomsday, Bennett defeated Jerry Lynn in his final ROH match before retirement.

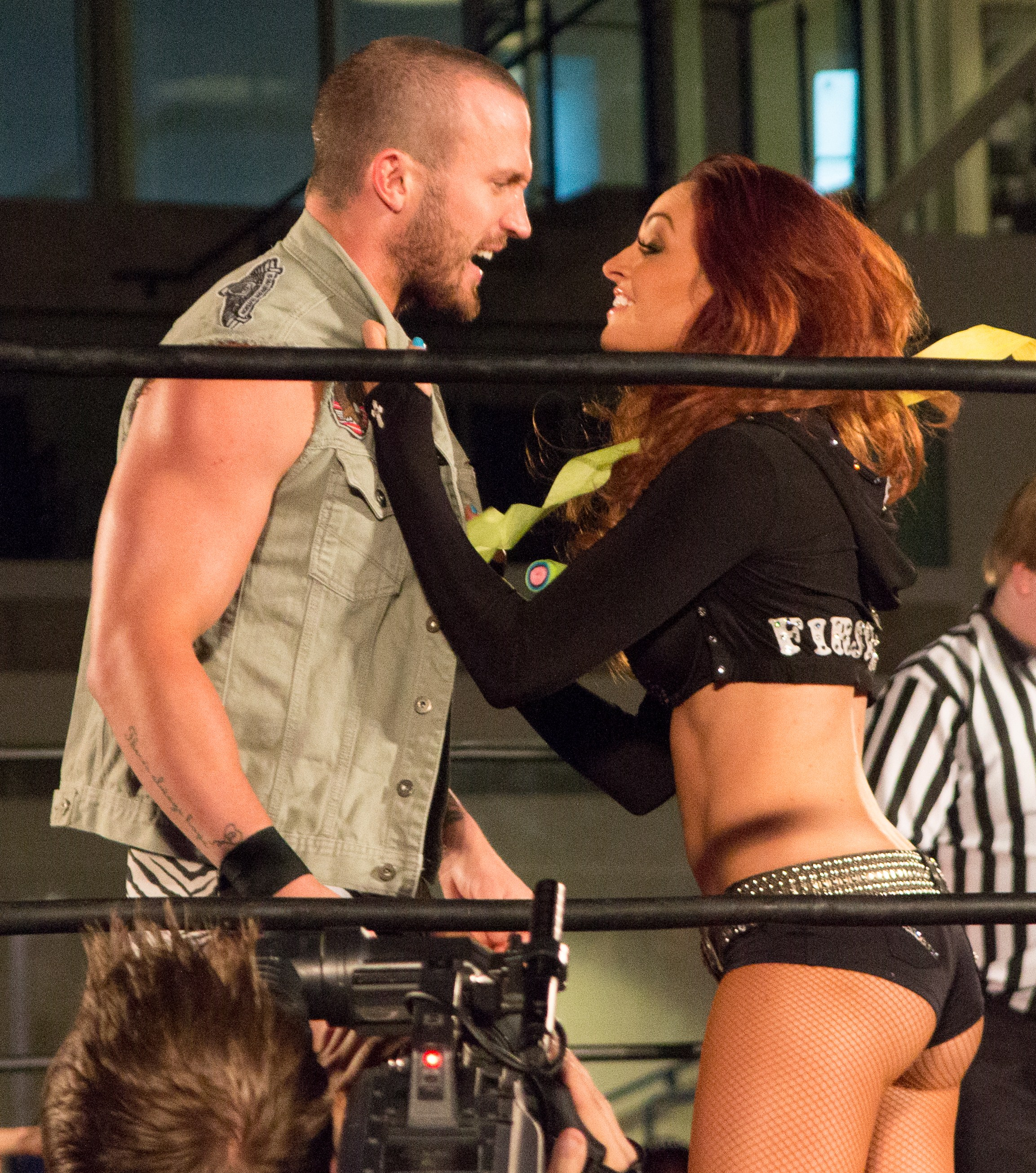
Bennett and Maria Kanellis making their ring entrance in August 2013

At the June 23, 2013, tapings of Ring of Honor Wrestling, Bennett teased leaving ROH, before turning on Evans and announcing that "The Prodigy is dead". On July 11, Bennett, now working as "Michael Bennett", was announced as a participant in the upcoming ROH World Championship tournament. On August 3, it was reported that Bennett that re-signed a long-term deal with ROH, after failing to come to terms with WWE. That same night, Bennett's first round ROH World Championship tournament match ended without a winner, when his opponent B. J. Whitmer was legitimately injured after a piledriver on the ring apron. ROH later awarded the win to Bennett, giving him a spot in the quarterfinals of the tournament. On August 17, Bennett was eliminated from the tournament by Tommaso Ciampa. The following month, Bennett started a feud with Kevin Steen over who had the more dangerous piledriver. The two faced off on October 26 at Glory By Honor XII, where Bennett was victorious, following a distraction from Kanellis. On December 14 at Final Battle 2013, Bennett was defeated by Steen in a Stretcher match and, as a result, could no longer use the piledriver in ROH.

Bennett and Maria aligned themselves with the ROH World Champion Adam Cole, and Matt Hardy, as The Kingdom. Throughout the summer, Maria and Bennett would get involved in Matt Hardy's feud with The Briscoes (Mark and Jay, the former ROH World Champion Jay Briscoe, who was stripped from the title and used a custom belt as the Real World Championship), which would result a tag team match at the Best in the World pay-per-view on June 22, which Hardy and Bennett would lose despite Maria's interference. On September 18, 2015, at All Star Extravaganza VII, Bennett and Taven won the ROH World Tag Team Championship by defeating The Addiction (Christopher Daniels and Frankie Kazarian) and The Young Bucks (Matt and Nick Jackson) in a three-way match. They lost the title to War Machine (Hanson and Ray Rowe) on December 18 at Final Battle. Bennett and Kanellis left ROH after the following day's Ring of Honor Wrestling taping, after failing to come to terms on a new contract with the promotion.

=== New Japan Pro-Wrestling (2014–2015; 2024) ===
In May 2014, Bennett took part in a tour co-produced by ROH and New Japan Pro-Wrestling (NJPW). On May 17 at War of the Worlds, Bennett was defeated by one of NJPW's top wrestlers, Hiroshi Tanahashi, in an interpromotional match. Through ROH's relationship with NJPW, Bennett made an appearance for the Japanese promotion on August 10 in Tokorozawa, Saitama, teaming with Adam Cole to defeat Captain New Japan and Jyushin Thunder Liger in a tag team match.

From November 23 to December 5, Bennett and Matt Taven represented ROH and The Kingdom in NJPW's 2014 World Tag League. The team finished their round-robin block with a record of four wins and three losses, failing to advance to the finals.

Bennett and Taven returned to NJPW on April 5, 2015, at Invasion Attack 2015, where they defeated Bullet Club (Doc Gallows and Karl Anderson) to win the IWGP Tag Team Championship. On July 5 at Dominion 7.5 in Osaka-jo Hall, The Kingdom lost the IWGP Tag Team Championship back to Bullet Club in their first defense. Bennett and Taven returned to NJPW in November to take part in the 2015 World Tag League, where they finished with a record of two wins and four losses, failing to advance from their block.

Bennett and Taven, as the Undisputed Kingdom, made their return to NJPW after nine years on November 8, 2024 at Fighting Spirit Unleashed, where they were defeated by Shingo Takagi and Yota Tsuji.

=== Total Nonstop Action Wrestling (2016–2017) ===
On the January 5, 2016 episode of Impact Wrestling, Bennett made his Total Nonstop Action Wrestling (TNA) debut with his wife Maria. He stated that he is "professional wrestling's Jesus". Three days later, at One Night Only: Live, Bennett made his in-ring debut, defeating Robbie E. Bennett challenged Kurt Angle on the Maximum Impact Tour; however, Angle said he does not wrestle anyone he does not respect, this caused Bennett to have a short feud with Drew Galloway, who Angle had respect for. His feud against Galloway culminated on the March 1 episode of Impact Wrestling, where Bennett defeated Galloway. The feud ended on the March 15 episode of Impact Wrestling, when Bennett and Maria defeated Galloway and Gail Kim. He started a feud against Ethan Carter III, during the April 12 episode of Impact Wrestling, he had a match against him, which ended in a disqualification, when Carter attacked Bennett with a chair. On the April 26 episode of Impact Wrestling, Bennett defeated Carter, ended his unpinned streak. On June 12, at Slammiversary, Bennett was defeated by Carter in their rematch. On the June 21 episode of Impact Wrestling, Bennett defeated Eddie Edwards to win the TNA X Division Championship. The following week, Bennett successfully retained his title against Braxton Sutter after he won a battle royal to earn his title shot. On the July 5 episode of Impact Wrestling, Bennett dropped the X Division Championship back to Eddie Edwards in an Ultimate X match.

At Destination X, he interrupted the main event by attacking Eddie Edwards and Lashley, with the help of debuting Moose. On the July 21 episode of Impact Wrestling, Bennett enter the Bound for Glory Playoff to challenge for the TNA World Heavyweight Championship at Bound for Glory, defeating Jeff Hardy in the first round and Drew Galloway in the semi-final, but lost the final round against Ethan Carter III. On the August 25 episode of Impact Wrestling, Bennett won a battle royal by eliminating Eddie Edwards and Moose to earn a title match against Lashley for the World Heavyweight Championship. The following week on Impact Wrestling, he lost the match, when Moose refused to help him. After the match, Bennett yelled at Moose, calling him "a failed football player", just before Moose attacked him. On October 2, at Bound for Glory, Bennett was defeated by Moose. Later that night, Bennett and Maria had a confrontation against the debuting Cody and his wife Brandi Rhodes. On the October 27 episode of Impact Wrestling, Bennett and Maria were defeated by Cody and Brandi Rhodes, thus ending the feud. On the November 10 episode of Impact Wrestling, Bennett defeated Moose to participate in a four-way match against Ethan Carter III, Lashley and Trevor Lee to determine the number one contender to the World Heavyweight Championship, which was won by Carter the following week. On the January 5, 2017 episode of Impact Wrestling, Bennett was defeated by Moose and failed to win the Impact Grand Championship. After the match, Bennett challenged Moose for a rematch at One Night Only: Live, which was won again by Moose. At Joker's Wild 2017, Bennett and Braxton Sutter defeated Tyrus and Crazzy Steve later that night Bennett competed in the 14-person intergender Joker's Wild gauntlet battle royal which was won by Moose. After being convinced by Kevin Owens, the couple didn't re-sign with TNA and, on March 1, they left the promotion.

=== WWE (2017–2020) ===
On April 18, 2017, Bennett was reported to have signed with WWE. On June 18, at the Money in the Bank, now billed as Mike Kanellis, he made his debut alongside his wife, Maria Kanellis. Over the following weeks, the Kanellis couple would be unintentionally interrupted by Sami Zayn, leading the Kanellis couple to demand an apology on the July 11 episode, but Zayn refused. This prompted Maria to slap Zayn, and Mike to attack Zayn with a vase, establishing both as villains and beginning a feud with Zayn. On the July 18 episode of SmackDown, Kanellis defeated Zayn in his WWE debut match, after interference from Maria. A rematch was subsequently scheduled for Battleground, which Zayn won. In total, he only wrestled four times on SmackDown due to going to rehab shortly after joining WWE and Maria getting pregnant around the same time.

On April 16, 2018, Kanellis was moved to the Raw brand as part of the Superstar Shake-up. At the Greatest Royal Rumble on April 28, Kanellis competed in the 50-man Royal Rumble match, but was quickly eliminated by Mark Henry after only three seconds. During his time on Raw, he did not win a match on their weekly show.

On the October 10 episode of 205 Live, Kanellis, alongside Maria, made his debut for the brand, attacking Lince Dorado. On the October 24 episode of 205 Live, he defeated Dorado in his debut match on the brand. Bennett would then join forces with TJP against Lucha House Party (Lince Dorado, Kalisto and Gran Metalik), with the feud ended on the December 4 episode of 205 Live, Bennett and TJP were defeated by Lucha House Party in a tornado tag team match. On the January 9, 2019 episode of 205 Live, Kanellis and Maria complained to the general manager Drake Maverick about how they had not been on the show for five weeks and that the new roster members that came to the brand would have to go through Kanellis first.

On January 16, Ryan Satin of Pro Wrestling Sheet reported that the Kanellis couple had asked WWE to release them from their contracts, and sources mentioned that the two have "been unhappy with the way they've been used in WWE for awhile." Maria would go on to deny that she asked for her release. Mike Johnson of Pro Wrestling Insider reported that they were not backstage at the following episode of 205 Live. They would not appear until the January 29 episode of 205 Live, where Kanellis would lose to Kalisto. On the March 19 episode of 205 Live, Kanellis defeated Akira Tozawa after a distraction from Maria, ending his losing streak. Kanellis went on to feud with Tozawa over the following weeks, culminating in a no disqualification match, won by Tozawa. In June, it was reported that the Kanellis couple signed multi-year extensions with WWE. A few weeks later, the Kanellis couple started appearing on Raw, with a storyline began where Maria announced her pregnancy, but she would start berating Kanellis, saying he was not the father, always insulting him, and accusing of not being a man. During the storyline, Kanellis won the WWE 24/7 Championship, his first-ever title in the company, but Maria ordered him later in the show to lay on his back and let the referee count to three as she became the 24/7 Champion. Kanellis won the title for a second time, after hugging and pinning Maria on her OB-GYN's bed, but lost the title to R-Truth moments later, as he pinned Kanellis in the OB-GYN's waiting room, disguised as a woman.

On October 14, four months after he signed a multi-year contract with WWE, he requested his release from WWE. Kanellis returned from hiatus on the February 14, 2020 episode of 205 Live, teaming with Tony Nese to defeat Ariya Daivari and The Brian Kendrick, turning face in the process.

On April 15, 2020, both Mike and Maria Kanellis were released by WWE along with several other superstars because of measures implemented by WWE due to the COVID-19 pandemic.

=== Return to independent circuit (2020) ===
After leaving WWE, Bennett used his real name in the independent circuit. On September 15, 2020, he faced Nick Aldis for the NWA World Heavyweight Championship United Wrestling Network Prime Time LIVE! pay-per-view, which he lost.

=== Return to ROH (2020–2021) ===
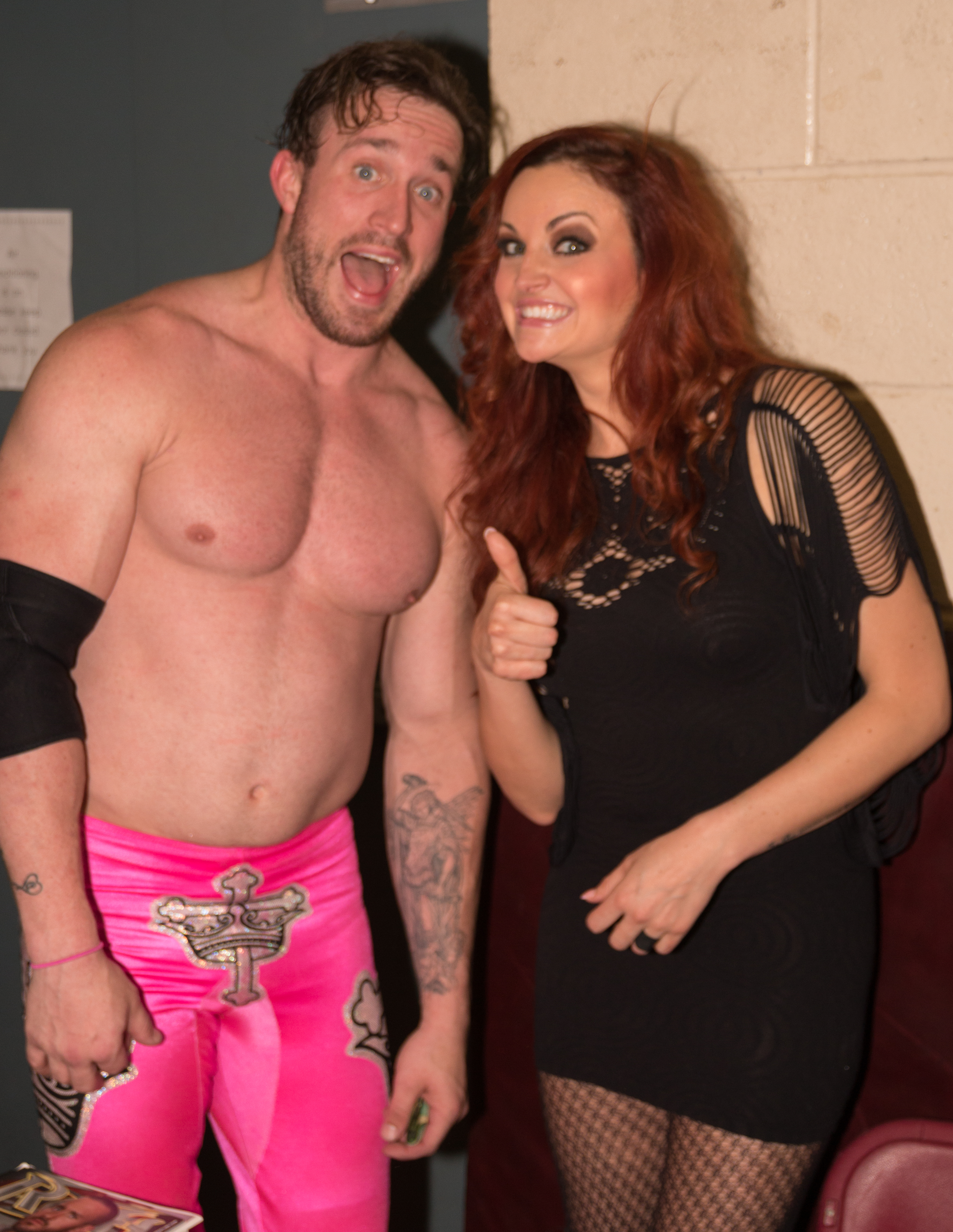
Bennett (left) with his wife Maria Kanellis

On November 21, 2020, Bennett made an appearance on Ring of Honor Wrestling television helping his former Kingdom partner Matt Taven fight off Vinny Marseglia and Bateman. On October 27, 2021, he was released by ROH among other wrestlers due to the company going on hiatus.

=== Return to Impact Wrestling (2022) ===
At Hard To Kill, on January 8, 2022, Bennett made his return to TNA, now known as Impact Wrestling, appeared along with Maria, Matt Taven, PCO, and Vincent, attacking Eddie Edwards, Rich Swann, Willie Mack, Heath and Rhino. On the September 1, 2022 episode of Impact!, they defeated The Good Brothers (Doc Gallows and Karl Anderson) to capture the Impact World Tag Team Championship for a first time. They would lose the titles on the October 20, 2022 edition of Impact! to Heath and Rhino. On October 8, 2022, it was announced that Bennett, Kanellis, Taven and Vincent had left Impact Wrestling.

=== All Elite Wrestling / Ring of Honor (2022–present) ===
Bennett made his All Elite Wrestling debut on the October 14, 2022, episode of Rampage, alongside Matt Taven and Maria Kanellis.

Bennett made his return to Ring of Honor – now AEW's sister promotion – at Final Battle in December 2022, where he and Bennett lost to Top Flight. At Supercard of Honor in March 2023, The Kingdom completed in a "Reach for the Sky" ladder match for the vacant ROH World Tag Team Championship, which was won by the Lucha Brothers. In April 2023, The Kingdom began a feud with Darius Martin and Action Andretti. In the same month The Kingdom defeated the duo. On May 18, The Kingdom faced Andretti and Martin in a Fight without Honor rematch, where they were defeated, ending their feud. In December 2023, Bennett and Matt Taven (wearing masks and billed as "The Devil's Masked Men") defeated MJF in a handicap match to win the ROH World Tag Team Championship for a third time. At Worlds End later that month, they revealed their identities, forming a new stable, the "Undisputed Kingdom", alongside Adam Cole, Roderick Strong, and Wardlow.

On April 5, 2024 at Supercard of Honor, the duo successfully defended their titles against The Infantry (Carlie Bravo and Shawn Dean). On August 17 episode of Collision, Bennett and Taven lost their ROH World Tag Team Championships to Dustin Rhodes and Sammy Guevara. On the October 23 episode of Dynamite, Bennett and the rest of the Undisputed Kingdom turned babyface and reignited their feud with MJF, who was now a heel.

After a brief absence from television, Bennett and Taven made their return as "The Kingdom" on the May 24 episode of Ring of Honor Wrestling, teaming with Spanish Announce Project (Angélico and Serpentico) in a losing effort against The Premier Athletes (Ariya Daivari and Tony Nese) and The Righteous (Dutch and Vincent). In January 2026, Taven departed AEW due to his contract expiring, leaving Bennett as a singles wrestler. At Supercard of Honor on May 15, Taven and Bennett reunited, answering Bustah and the Brain's (Alec Price and Jordan Oliver) open challenge.

== Other media ==
=== Filmography ===
Year	Title	Role	Notes
2014	Penance	Guy	
2015	Almost Mercy	Officer Rudolph	
2017	Saving Christmas	Max Miracle	

Kanellis made his video game debut as part of the Rising Stars Pack of downloadable content created for WWE 2K19 and also appeared in WWE 2K20.

== Personal life ==
In an interview in December 2011, Maria Kanellis confirmed she was dating Bennett, and they later got engaged. Bennett and Kanellis married on October 10, 2014. They have three children together.

== Championships and accomplishments ==
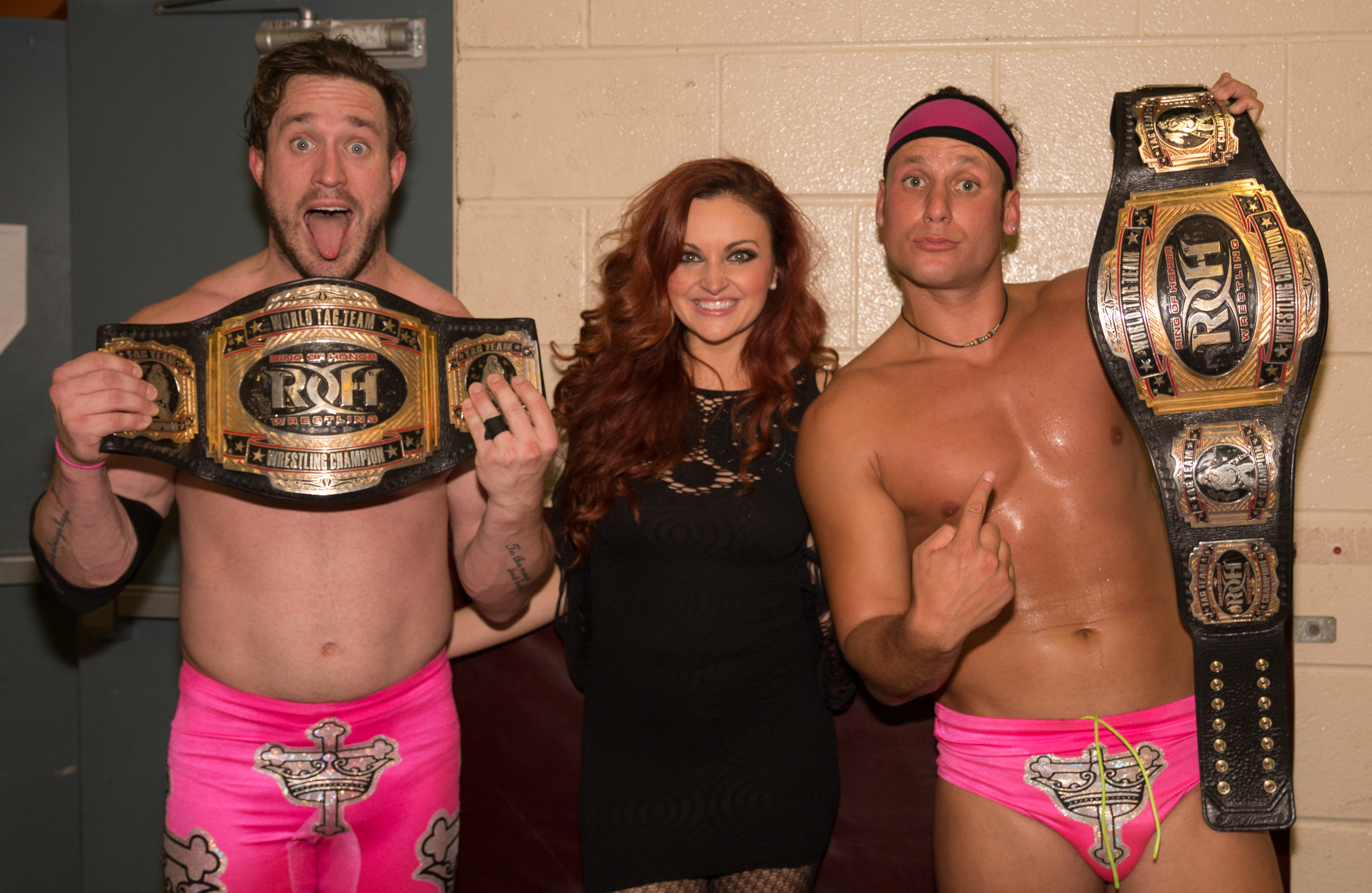
Bennett and Matt Taven are three-time ROH World Tag Team Champions...

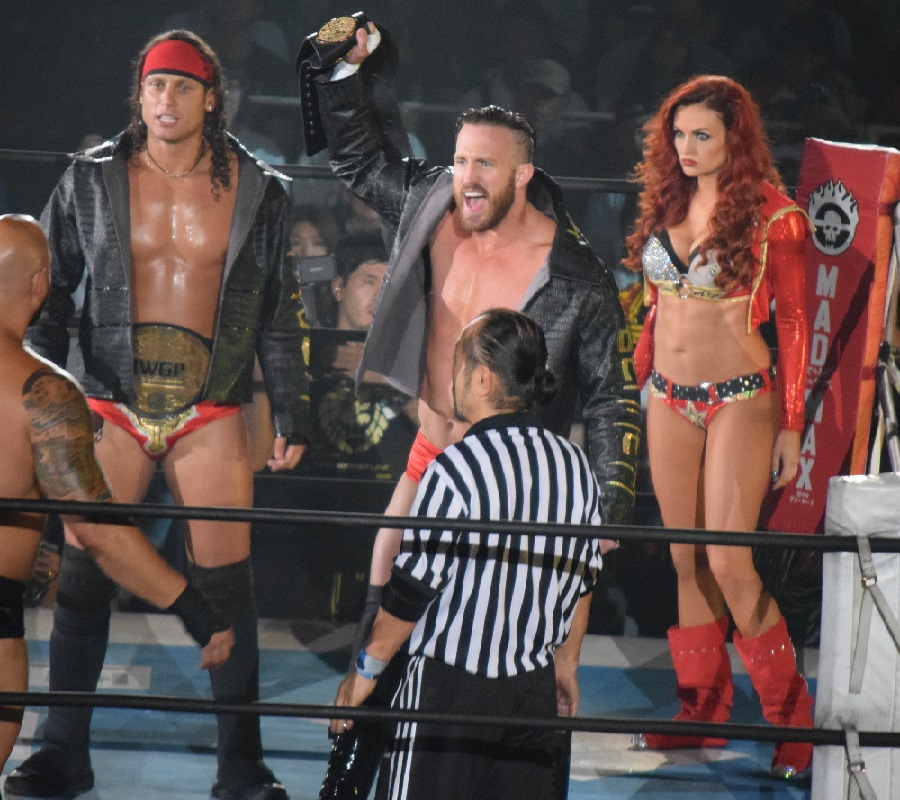
...and former IWGP Tag Team Champions.

- Eastern Pro Wrestling
  - EPW Television Championship (1 time)
  - EPW United States Championship (1 time)
- Neo Revolution Grappling
  - NRG Heavyweight Championship (1 time)
- New England Wrestling Alliance
  - NEWA Heavyweight Championship (1 time)
- New Japan Pro-Wrestling
  - IWGP Tag Team Championship (1 time) – with Matt Taven
- Northeast Championship Wrestling
  - NCW Tag Team Championship (1 time) – with Chris Venom and Johnny Idol
- Northeast Wrestling
  - NEW Heavyweight Championship (1 time)
- Palē Pro Wrestling
  - Palē Pro Heavyweight Championship (1 time)
- Pro Wrestling Experience
  - PWE United States Championship (1 time)
- Pro Wrestling Illustrated
  - Ranked No. 51 of the top 500 wrestlers in the PWI 500 in 2016
- Ring of Honor
  - ROH World Tag Team Championship (3 times) – with Matt Taven
  - Top Prospect Tournament (2011)
  - Honor Rumble (2014)
  - ROH Year-End Award (1 time)
    - Holy S*** Moment of the Year (2020) for returning to ROH and saving Matt Taven from The Righteous
- The Wrestling Revolver
  - Revolver World Tag Team Championship (1 time) – with Matt Taven
- Top Rope Promotions
  - TRP Heavyweight Championship (1 time)
  - TRP Tag Team Championship (1 time) – with Bryce Andrews
  - Kowalski Cup (2006)
- Total Nonstop Action Wrestling/Impact Wrestling
  - TNA X Division Championship (1 time)
  - Impact World Tag Team Championship (1 time) – with Matt Taven
- WWE
  - WWE 24/7 Championship (2 times)
- Wrestling Federation of America
  - WFA Tag Team Championship (2 time) – with The Ray (1) and The Shane (1)
  - WFA Tag Team Championship Tournament (2004) – with The Ray
- Xtreme Wrestling Alliance
  - XWA Heavyweight Championship (1 time)
- Yankee Pro Wrestling
  - YPW Cruiserweight Championship (1 time)
  - YPW Tag Team Championship (1 time) - with Vain
