= Freetown & Lakeville Public Schools =

School district in Massachusetts, US

Address
- 98 Howland Road Lakeville, Massachusetts, 2347; United States

District information
- Type: Public
- Grades: PreK–12
- NCES District ID: 2505070

Students and staff
- Students: 3,015(2025-2026)
- Teachers: 198.76 (on an FTE basis)
- Staff: 141.43 (on an FTE basis)
- Student–teacher ratio: 13.59:1

Other information
- Website: www.freelake.org

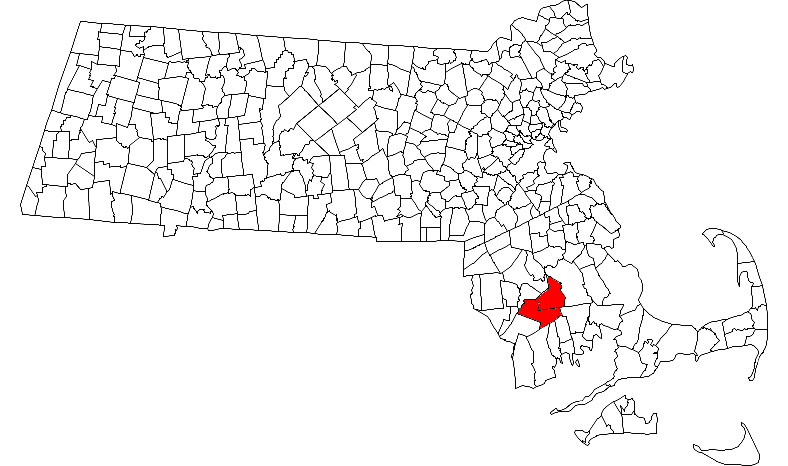
Freetown & Lakeville, Massachusetts.

Freetown & Lakeville Public Schools, formally the Freetown-Lakeville Regional School District is a school district serving the towns of Freetown and Lakeville in Massachusetts, United States.

== Local vs. District ==
The Freetown and Lakeville schools historically existed on two tiers: the local schools, controlled by each town individually, and the district schools, controlled by both towns. The elementary schools (originally 1-6, subsequently K-4) were controlled by each town's school committee, owned by each town individually, and were not subject in any way to the other town. The regional schools (originally Apponequet, subsequently Apponequet and the then-Austin Middle School) were likewise controlled by both towns under the District.

Under this system, an elementary school teacher is employed by either Freetown or Lakeville, but a middle or high school teacher is employed by the District. The Superintendent and other main administrative personnel are actually employed by three different entities: Freetown, Lakeville, and Freetown-Lakeville.

A theoretical "third tier" was added in 2004 when the former Austin Middle School reopened as the George R. Austin Intermediate School. GRAIS contained not only the District's fifth grade, but Lakeville's local fourth grade, creating a system where one building was under the control of two different school committees. This has led to minor confusion over which entity is ultimately responsible for the building, even though it remains the property of both towns. This was eliminated in 2009 with the fourth graders moving back to Assawompsett. For the 2012-2013 school year 4th grade will be added from both towns to George R. Austin Intermediate School. Fifth grade will remain as well.

== Principals, Vice Principals, and Superintendent ==
- Assawompsett Elementary School: Bethany Pineaut (Principal)
- Freetown Elementary School: Michael Ward (Principal)
- George R. Austin Intermiediate School: Dr. Elizabeth Sullivan (Principal)
- Freetown-Lakeville Middle School: Bryan Oliveira (Principal) and Andrew Materna(Assistant Principal)
- Apponequet Regional High School: Kahlan Dessert Principal)
- Superintendent: Barbara Starkie

== Freetown Schools ==
- Freetown Elementary School

== Lakeville Schools ==
- Assawompsett Elementary School

== Freetown-Lakeville Schools ==
- George R. Austin Intermediate School
- Freetown-Lakeville Middle School
- Apponequet Regional High School

== Other High Schools ==
Students in grades 9 to 12 that wish to attend a Vocational Technical High School may attend Old Colony Regional Vocational Technical High School. Note that Lakeville is a member town while Freetown is not and students are limited to about 90 from Freetown. Students in grades 9 to 12 that wish to attend an Agricultural High School may attend[Bristol County Agricultural High School. Technically, students from Lakeville could apply to Norfolk County Agricultural High School, as they are in Plymouth County, but in practice they apply to Bristol Aggie. Students could also go to local private high schools.

=== Transportation to Old Colony ===
Lakeville students receives buses from Old Colony while Freetown receives buses from Freetown-Lakeville. Freetown students must take an Apponequet bus and then transfer at Apponequet to an Old Colony bus from Apponequet.

=== Transportation to Bristol County Agricultural ===
Students attending Bristol County Agricultural High School receive buses from Bristol County Aggie unlike Old Colony Students. However, Students must take an Apponequet bus and then transfer to a Bristol County Agricultural bus from Apponequet.

== See also ==
- List of school districts in Massachusetts
