= Milton Silveira =

- Born: Milton Antone Silveira; May 4, 1929; Mattapoisett, Massachusetts
- Died: July 11, 2013 (aged 84); McLean, Virginia
- Education: University of Vermont; University of Virginia; Virginia Tech; University of Houston
- Occupation: Aerospace engineer
- Known for: Involvement in multiple NASA spaceflight programs

Milton Antone Silveira (May 4, 1929 – July 11, 2013) was an American aerospace engineer, pilot and academic of Portuguese descent, serving as NASA's Chief Engineer between 1983 and 1986. He was involved in numerous crewed spaceflight programs, including Mercury, Gemini and Apollo, and also contributed to the investigation into the 1986 Space Shuttle Challenger disaster.

== Early life, education and military career ==
Milton Silveira was born in Mattapoisett, Massachusetts, in 1929. His parents, Antonne and Carolinda Silveira, were immigrants from the Azores. His love of aeronautics began at age 16, when he acquired his pilot's license. Silveira attended Fairhaven High School, and gained a BSc in mechanical engineering from the University of Vermont, where he was president of the flying club.

In June 1951, Silveira joined NASA's predecessor, the National Advisory Committee for Aeronautics (NACA), in Langley, Virginia. In September 1951, he was called to duty as an army aviator by the United States Army and later served as the Chief Engineering and Maintenance Officer of the U.S. 8th Army in Korea. In 1955, he returned to NACA. He continued his education simultaneously – in 1960, he received an MSc in aeronautical engineering from the University of Virginia, and he conducted post-graduate work at Virginia Tech and the University of Houston between 1960 and 1968.

== NASA career ==
When NACA was replaced by NASA in 1958, Silveira continued working for it as an aerospace technologist. In 1964, he became the deputy chief of the Aerodynamics Branch of NASA's Advanced Spaceflight Technology Division. He oversaw the development of the Little Joe II launch vehicle, and also worked on the Mercury, Gemini, Apollo and Skylab programs. He served as the engineering manager of the Space Shuttle program between 1969 and 1973.

In 1983, after nearly a decade of mid-level involvement with the Space Shuttle program, Silveira became NASA's Chief Engineer. In the aftermath of the Space Shuttle Challenger disaster in January 1986, he collaborated with an independent review board to investigate the causes of the disaster. Silveira retired from NASA in 1987, though he retained many links to the organization. He briefly worked for the Ford Aerospace Corporation, before becoming a consultant with the United States Department of Defense.

== Personal life ==
Silveira was survived by his four children – Leeland Silveira, Douglas Silveira, Carolyn Silveira-Krumrey and Scott Silveira. He maintained a long-term association with the University of Vermont by conducting a regular teleconference class for its engineering school and serving on the College of Engineering and Mathematical Sciences Board, culminating in his establishing the Milton Silveira annual award for junior faculty members of the College. He was also a docent of the National Gallery of Art, and was an accomplished amateur gourmet chef.
