= Sarah R. Atsatt =

American herpetologist and educator (1888-1971)

Dr Sarah R. Atsatt
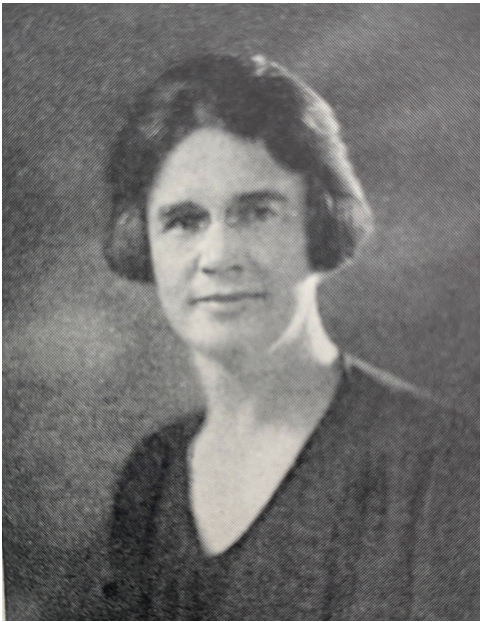
- Born: Sarah Rogers Atsatt; October 28, 1888; Mattapoisett, Massachusetts
- Died: December 12, 1971 (aged 83); Ojai, California
- Education: Pomona College; University of California, Berkeley
- Occupation: Herpetologist
- Employer: UCLA

Sarah Rogers Atsatt (October 28, 1888 - December 12, 1971) was an American herpetologist. She was an authority on reptilian behavior, and the first woman professor in biology at UCLA.

== Early life and education ==
Sarah Rogers Atsatt was born in Mattapoisett, Massachusetts on October 28, 1888. She was descended on both sides of her family from arrivals to the US on the Mayflower. One of these ancestors was Miles Standish. The family moved to California in 1904, and Atsatt graduated from Pomona College in 1910.

== Career ==
Following graduation, Atsatt worked at the University of California, Berkeley, and taught biology at Mills College.

In 1915, she joined the Natural Science Department of the California State Normal School in Los Angeles. In 1919, this became the Southern Branch of the University of California. There, Atsatt was a "pioneer member of the biology department", teaching physiology and anatomy. She also taught at Scripps College between 1927 and 1933.

In 1931, Atsatt gained her doctorate from Berkeley, returning to UCLA in 1933 as a member of the Department of Biology (later zoology). She remained there until her retirement in 1955. Atsatt's principal research interest was herpetology, and particularly reptilian behavior. She spent September 1939 to January 1940 traveling through Southern and Central Africa.

Atsatt's major research contribution was “Color changes as controlled by temperature and light in the lizards of the desert regions of Southern California.” This was described as:

an early and fundamental study in this field, carried out with careful attention to the control of experimental conditions, with precise characterization of the color changes, and with a correlation of laboratory findings and field observations.

As a professor, Atsatt introduced a number of innovations in the teaching of those courses for which she was responsible.

== Professional memberships ==
Atsatt was a member of the American Society of Ichthyologists and Herpetologists, serving as president of its western division in 1936. She belonged to the Ecological Society of America, the Cooper Ornithological Society and The Herpetologists' League. In 1951, she became a council member of the Pacific Division of the American Association for the Advancement of Science.

== Death and legacy ==
Sarah Rogers Atsatt died on 12 December 1971 at Ojai, California. The University of California remembered her as:

a warm human being particularly interested in human relationships, unstinting in helping others. She was the prime organizer of many weekend biological field trips, which included both students and faculty. She was the founder and for a long time the leader of the Bird Study Group of the Women's Faculty Club; she served on the University Welfare Committee of the Academic Senate. During the Nazi persecution of European scholars, she volunteered substantial aid to some of them. After her retirement, she was active in community affairs, became a precinct worker for her political party, and a deputy registrar of voters.
