= Old Rochester Regional School District =

School district in Massachusetts, United States

Address
- 135 Marion Road Mattapoisett, Massachusetts, 2739; United States

District information
- Type: Public
- Grades: 7–12
- NCES District ID: 2509150

Students and staff
- Students: 1,130 (2020–2021)
- Teachers: 90.58 (on an FTE basis)
- Staff: 63.49 (on an FTE basis)
- Student–teacher ratio: 12.48:1

Other information
- Website: www.oldrochester.org

The Old Rochester Regional School District and Superintendency Union # 55 serve the towns of Marion, Mattapoisett and Rochester in Plymouth County, Massachusetts. The three communities have a combined year round population of just over 15,000. The communities are located in the southeast corner of Massachusetts within 60 miles (97 km) of both Boston and Providence and within 10 miles (16 km) of the Cape Cod Canal. This location provides easy access to numerous cultural, recreational and educational resources.

== Schools ==
Currently, the district serves in excess of 2,700 students. Through the organizational structure of four school committees, the district operates six schools:

- Sippican Elementary School, Marion
- Center School, Mattapoisett
- Old Hammondtown Elementary School, Mattapoisett
- Old Rochester Regional High School, Mattapoisett
- Old Rochester Regional Junior High School, Mattapoisett
- Rochester Memorial Elementary School, Rochester

=== Schools not Managed by ORR ===
Students in Rochester or Mattapoisett may attend Old Colony Regional Vocational Technical High School, while students in Marion may attend Upper Cape Cod Regional Technical High School.
