= Killer Kowalski Cup Tournament =

Professional wrestling round-robin tag team tournament

The Killer Kowalski Cup Tournament is a professional wrestling round-robin tag team tournament held by Top Rope Promotions.

The Kowalski Cup is held under a points system, with two points for a win, one for a draw and none for a loss. The team finishing atop the points standings are the winners. Matches in the Tenkaichi Jr. have a 30-minute time limit.

== Format ==
Wrestlers compete in a variety of "qualifying" matches, usually either singles matches or tag team matches, with the winner(s) of each match advancing to an elimination match where the last remaining competitor would be deemed the Killer Kowalski Cup Tournament winner

== List of winners ==
- 2006 – Mike Bennett
- 2007 – BK Jordan
- 2008 – Jason Blade
- 2009 – Stevie Richards
- 2010 – Matt Taven
- 2011 – Matt Magnum
- 2012 – Vinny Marseglia
- 2013 – Biff Busick
- 2014 – Nick Steel
- 2015 – Vinny Marseglia
- 2016 – Nico Silva
