= Old Colony Regional Vocational Technical High School =

Old Colony Regional Vocational Technical High School (District)

Location
- 476 North Ave., Rochester, Massachusetts 02770; United States; 41°47′09″N 70°52′18″W

Information
- Type: Public
- Established: 1970s
- Superintendent: Aaron Polansky
- Principal: J. Michael Parker
- Teaching staff: 62.00 (FTE)
- Grades: 9-12
- Enrollment: 549 (2023–2024)
- Student to teacher ratio: 8.85
- Classes offered: Career/Technical/Academic
- Hours in school day: 7:45 A.M. - 2:16 P.M.
- Campus: Rural
- Color
- Mascot: Cougars
- Budget: $10,603,059 total $19,211 per pupil (2016)
- Communities served: Acushnet, Carver, Mattapoisett, Rochester, Freetown (Not a member district-Tuition Students only), Lakeville
- Feeder schools: Carver-Middle High School, Ford Middle School, Freetown-Lakeville Middle School, Old Rochester Regional Junior High School
- Website: Old Colony RVTHS Website

Old Colony Regional Vocational Technical High School or Old Colony Regional Vocational Technical High School District is located on an 80-acre campus in Rochester, Massachusetts, United States, the geographical center of the five-member town school district that includes Acushnet, Carver, Mattapoisett, Rochester and students from Freetown & Lakeville Public Schools. Note that Lakeville is a member town while, Freetown is not and its students served are limited to around 90. Old Colony is fully accredited by the New England Association of Schools and Colleges, as well as the Massachusetts Department of Elementary and Secondary Education.

== Administrative staff ==
Old Colony is its own district thus having a superintendent onsite, Mr. Aaron Polansky (Mr. Polansky's title is Superintendent-Director), replacing former superintendent Mr. Frank Cote. OC has one principal, and according to the school's website, Mr. J. Michael Parker has been named as the new principal, replacing former principal Mrs. Karen Guenette. The school also has a dean of students, Mr. Gary Linehan The school has a Special Services Coordinator, Ms. Krista Sylvain. The school also has a CTE Director, Mrs. Bethany Botelho, replacing former CTE Director Ms. Jackie Machamer.

== Post Old Colony ==
Graduates receive a high school diploma and a certificate of proficiency in their technical area of study. Old Colony's four-year program of studies allows students to directly enter the job market as skilled workers or to continue their education at any college, university, or technical school. Their Tech/Prep Program guarantees admission to Bristol Community College after completing the two-year courses at Old Colony. Also, college credit can be awarded for technical training received at Old Colony from Wentworth Institute, New England Institute of Technology, and Johnson & Wales University.

== Sports ==
Old Colony has numerous varsity sports available for all students to play throughout the school year. Old Colony plays in the Mayflower Athletic Conference and are part of the small division. The school's athletic director is Mr. Matt Trahan.
