= Old Rochester Regional High School =

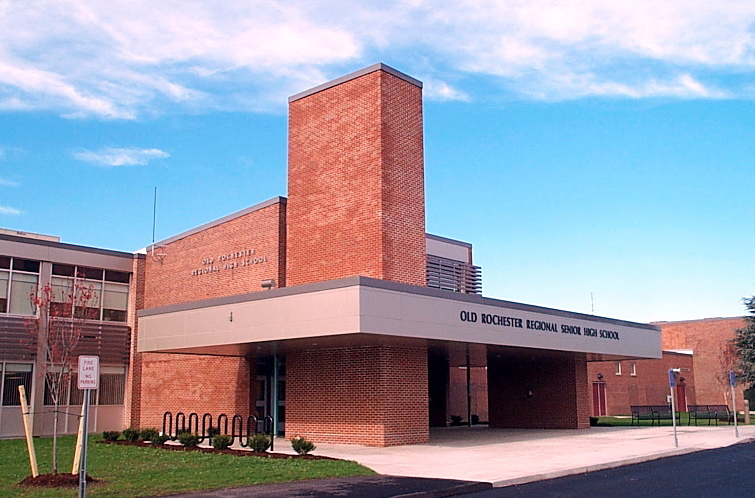
- ORRHS's Main Entrance in 2011

Location
- 135 Marion Rd. Mattapoisett, Massachusetts 02739; United States; 41°40′20.98″N 70°46′43.13″W

Information
- Type: Public; Open enrollment
- Motto: Operate Responsibly and Respectfully
- Established: 1961
- School district: Old Rochester Regional School District
- Superintendent: Michael Nelson
- Principal: Michael Devoll
- Faculty: 54.00 (FTE)
- Grades: 9-12
- Enrollment: 749 (2020–21)
- Student to teacher ratio: 13.87
- Colors: Red, white, and black
- Mascot: Bulldog
- Newspaper: Paw Prints
- Communities served: Marion, Mattapoisett, Rochester, Wareham
- Website: orrhs.oldrochester.org

Old Rochester Regional High School (ORR) serves the towns of Marion, Mattapoisett, and Rochester. It also includes the neighboring town of Wareham. The school was originally built in 1961 and underwent a major renovation beginning in 2001. This project added richard and combined the high school with the adjacent Old Rochester Regional Junior High School. The student population is approximately 700 students. Although the school is named "Old Rochester", it is not located in the current town of Rochester. Instead, it was built in Mattapoisett. The name Old Rochester refers to the original town of Rochester which included all three towns served by ORRHS.

== Athletics ==
Old Rochester offers a wide variety of athletic programs for girls and boys. These include track and field, winter track, spring track, swim team, basketball, ice hockey, football, lacrosse, volleyball, soccer, sail, softball, dance, field hockey, golf, and cross country.

== Academics ==
ORRHS offers a wide array of classes to students and currently operates 11 departments. Both honors level and AP level courses are offered.

== Notable alumni ==
- Scott Dragos, former American football fullback and tight end who played for the Chicago Bears in 2000-2001
- Conrad Henri Roy III, American man who died by suicide at the age of 18 with encouragement from his girlfriend, Michelle Carter
