= Marion, Massachusetts =

- Town
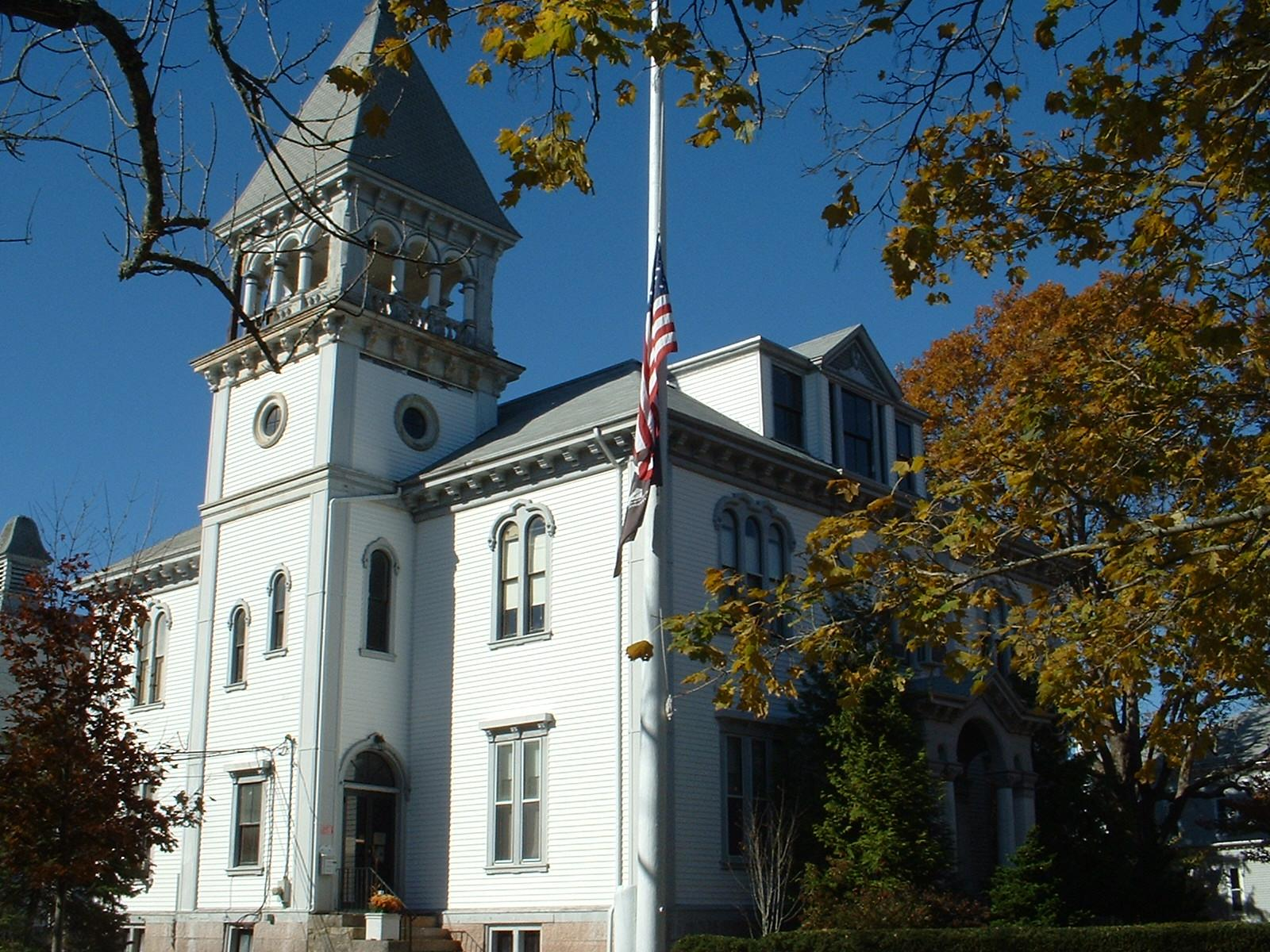
- Marion Town House

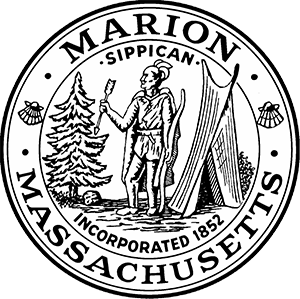
- Seal

- Location in Plymouth County in Massachusetts
- Coordinates: 41°42′00″N 70°45′48″W
- Country: United States
- State: Massachusetts
- County: Plymouth
- Settled: 1679
- Incorporated: 1852

Government
  - Type: Open town meeting

Area
  - Total: 26.1 sq mi (67.7 km^{2})
  - Land: 14.0 sq mi (36.2 km^{2})
  - Water: 12.1 sq mi (31.4 km^{2})
- Elevation: 20 ft (6 m)

Population (2020)
  - Total: 5,347
  - Density: 383/sq mi (148/km^{2})
- Time zone: UTC-5 (Eastern)
  - Summer (DST): UTC-4 (Eastern)
- ZIP code: 02738
- Area code: 508 / 774
- FIPS code: 25-38540
- GNIS feature ID: 0618345
- Website: www.marionma.gov

Marion is a town in Plymouth County, Massachusetts, United States. The population was 5,347 at the 2020 census.

For geographic and demographic information on the village of Marion Center, please see the article Marion Center, Massachusetts.

Marion is a part of the South Coast region of Massachusetts which encompasses the communities that surround Buzzards Bay (excluding the Elizabeth Islands, Bourne and Falmouth), Mount Hope Bay and the Sakonnet River.

== History ==
Marion was first settled in 1679 as "Sippican", a district of Rochester, Massachusetts. The name, which also lends itself to the river which passes through the north of town and the harbor at the heart of town, was the Wampanoag name for the local tribe. The town was mostly known for its many local sea captains and sailors whose homes were in town, although there were also some small shipbuilding operations on the harbor as well. By the late 1840s, however, tensions between the village of Mattapoisett and the town led to a battle which sought to redraw the town lines and effectively take over Sippican Village. This caused the villagers to form a committee, which went to Boston to petition for incorporation as its own town. Thus, with the help of a powerful local ally, the town was incorporated on May 14, 1852, and renamed Marion in honor of Revolutionary War hero Francis Marion. Mattapoisett was incorporated in 1857.

Since that time, Marion's economy has mostly relied on the waters of Buzzards Bay, both for fishing and for the summer tourism industry. Recreational sailing is a major seasonal activity for residents and visitors.

== Geography ==
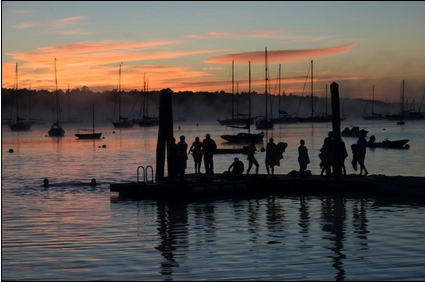
Sippican Harbor

According to the United States Census Bureau, the town has a total area of 26.1 square miles (67.7 km^{2}), of which 14.0 square miles (36.2 km^{2}) is land and 12.1 square miles (31.4 km^{2}), or 46.46%, is water. The town is bordered by Mattapoisett to the southwest, Rochester to the northwest, and Wareham to the north and northeast. The town is approximately 15 miles (24 km) by road west of the Cape Cod Canal, 12 miles (19 km) east of New Bedford, 40 miles (64 km) east-southeast of Providence, Rhode Island, and 50 miles (80 km) south of Boston.

Marion is located on Buzzards Bay, and its geography is shaped by the water. Much of the town is separated into two halves by Sippican Harbor, with Converse Point to the west and Sippican Neck to the east. To the west of Converse Point is Aucoot Cove, where Aucoot Creek and Borden's Brook empty into the bay. Sprague's Cove, Hammetts Cove (which is directly east of Little Neck), Blankenship Cove and Planting Island Cove are all coves off Sippican Harbor. To the east of Sippican Neck is Wings Cove, which separates the neck from Great Hill Point. Along the northeastern border of town is the Weweantic River, which separates the town from Wareham. The Sippican River is also a tributary to this river, and further divides the town from Wareham. Between Sippican Harbor and the Weweantic River lies the Great Swamp. To the north of Marion lies Rochester. Marion has several parks, as well as wharves, beaches, The Beverly Yacht Club, Little Marion G.C. (public), and The Kittansett Club G.C. (private). Marion is a typical old New England town that has a small quaint village with many traditional Cape Cod style homes. The village includes The Marion General Store, that dates back to the 1800s.

== Climate ==
The town of Marion, Massachusetts is a part of the South Coast of Massachusetts, has a Humid continental climate, bordering on either an Oceanic climate, or Subtropical climate, typical of its location, Which is characterized by warm, humid summers, and cold to freezing winters, according to NOAA Weather Radio, with temperatures regularly dropping below freezing throughout the season. The maritime influence helps regulate the temperatures somewhat, leading to milder winters, and cooler summers, as the town of Marion is bordering on Buzzards Bay.

== Demographics ==
Historical population
Year	Pop.	±%
1860	918	—
1870	896	−2.4%
1880	958	+6.9%
1890	871	−9.1%
1900	902	+3.6%
1910	1,460	+61.9%
1920	1,288	−11.8%
1930	1,638	+27.2%
1940	2,030	+23.9%
1950	2,250	+10.8%
1960	2,881	+28.0%
1970	3,466	+20.3%
1980	3,932	+13.4%
1990	4,496	+14.3%
2000	5,123	+13.9%
2010	4,907	−4.2%
2020	5,347	+9.0%
2022*	5,291	−1.0%
* = population estimate. Source: United States Census records and Population Estimates Program data.

As of the census of 2000, there were 5,123 people, 1,996 households, and 1,441 families residing in the town. The population density was 350.2 inhabitants per square mile (135.2/km^{2}). There were 2,439 housing units at an average density of 166.7 per square mile (64.4/km^{2}). The racial makeup of the town was 92.17% White, 1.58% African American, 0.10% Native American, 0.35% Asian, 0.08% Pacific Islander, 3.46% from other races, and 2.26% from two or more races. Hispanic or Latino of any race were 0.55% of the population.

There were 1,996 households, out of which 31.7% had children under the age of 18 living with them, 61.4% were married couples living together, 8.4% had a female householder with no husband present, and 27.8% were non-families. 24.1% of all households were made up of individuals, and 11.9% had someone living alone who was 65 years of age or older. The average household size was 2.51 and the average family size was 3.00.

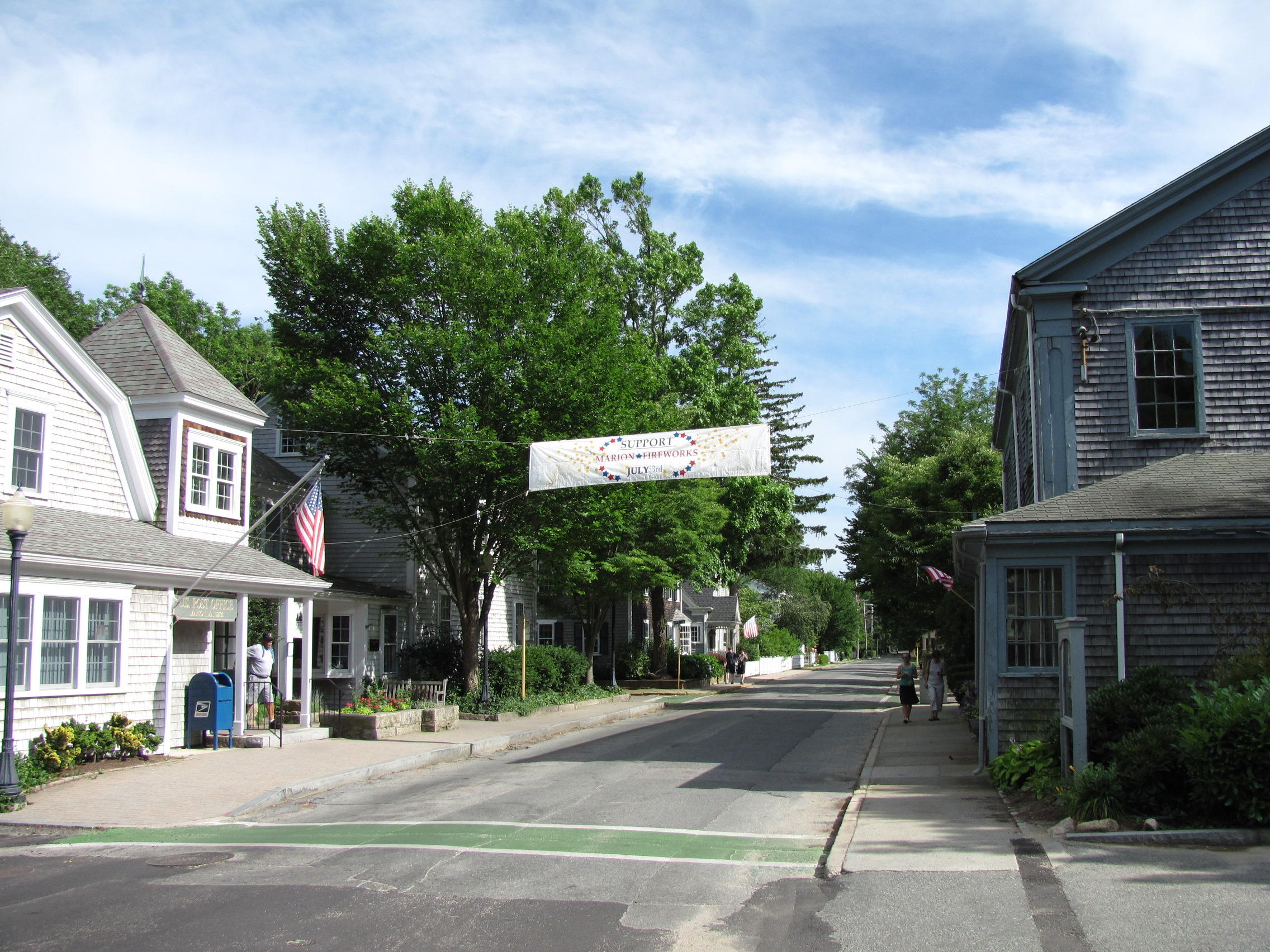
Front Street with 4th of July banner

In the town, the population was spread out, with 25.1% under the age of 18, 4.2% from 18 to 24, 24.7% from 25 to 44, 28.3% from 45 to 64, and 17.7% who were 65 years of age or older. The median age was 42 years. For every 100 females, there were 92.4 males. For every 100 females age 18 and over, there were 87.8 males.

The median income for a household in the town was $105,813 and the median income per capita was $63,437 as of 2021 data. 2.2% of persons were living below the poverty line. 56% of adults of 25 were in the workforce, including 53.5% of adult women. 48.5% of adults have a bachelor's degree or higher and 95.8% have a high school degree.

Males had a median income of $46,711 versus $35,911 for females (outdated). About 3.5% of families and 4.6% of the population were below the poverty line, including 7.0% of those under age 18 and 2.0% of those age 65 or over.

== Government ==
Marion is represented in the Massachusetts House of Representatives as a part of the Tenth Bristol district, which also includes Fairhaven, Mattapoisett, Rochester and a portion of Middleborough. The town is represented in the Massachusetts Senate as a part of the First Plymouth and Bristol district, which also includes Berkley, Bridgewater, Carver, Dighton, Middleborough, Raynham, Taunton, and Wareham. The town is patrolled by the Marion Police Department.

On the national level, Marion is a part of Massachusetts's 9th congressional district, and is currently represented by William R. Keating. The state's senior member of the United States Senate is Elizabeth Warren. The junior senator is Ed Markey.

Marion uses the open town meeting form of government, which is led by a board of selectmen. The town's police, as well as the post office, are all located in the town's central village. The village is also the site of the Elizabeth Taber Library, which is a member of the SAILS Library Network. The Fire/EMS Department is almost completely on-call with only (2) full-time or career members. Fire stations are located at Station No. 1 in the central village on Spring Street and Station No. 2 in East Marion at the corner of Point and Creek Rd. near the Great Swamp.

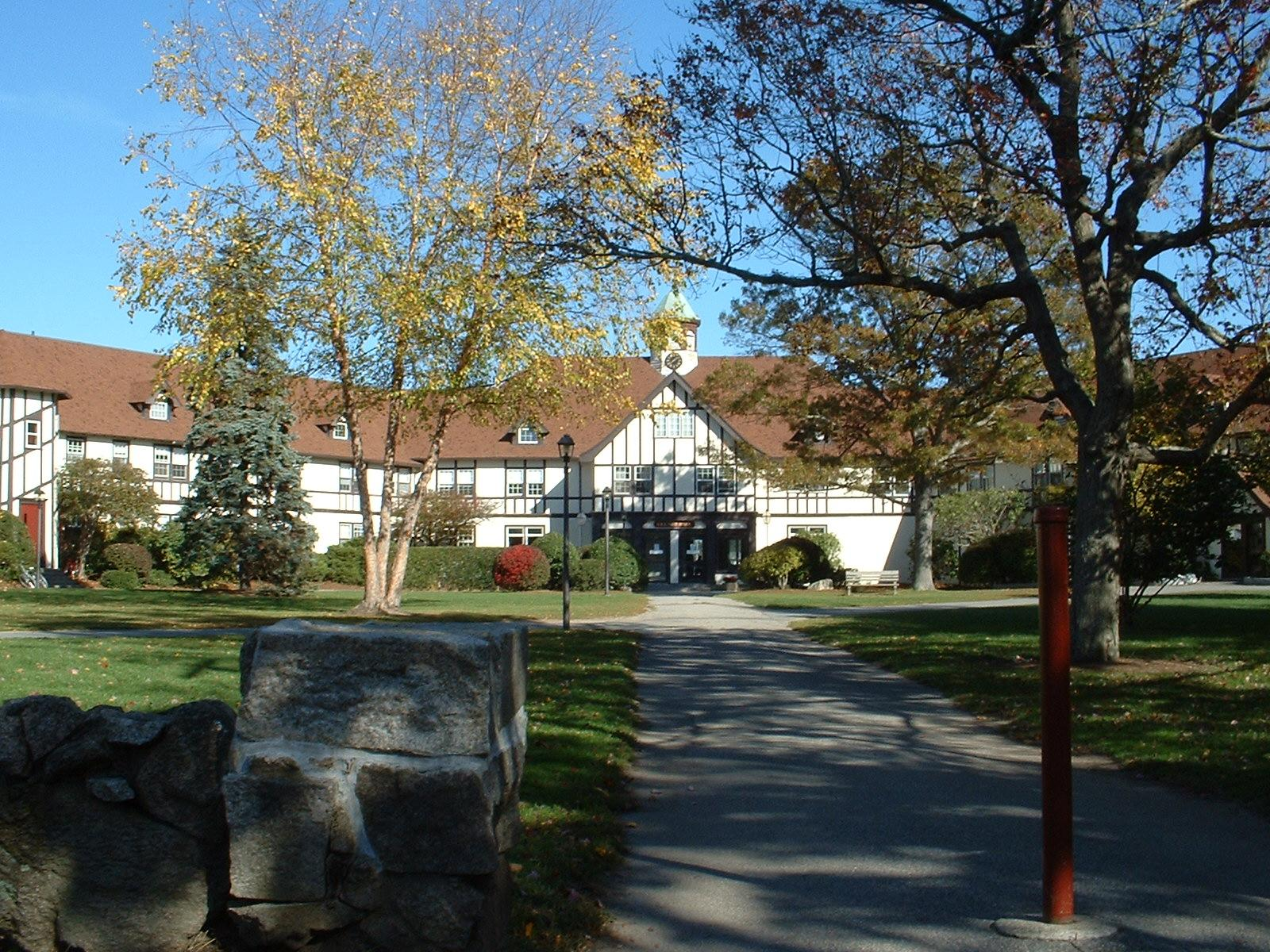
Tabor Academy

Marion was historically a Republican stronghold, and was the only municipality in Plymouth County to vote for Barry Goldwater over Lyndon B. Johnson in the 1964, even as Johnson won Massachusetts in a landslide due to Goldwater’s unpopularity in the Northeast. Today, however, Marion is much more liberal, in fact, it was the only town in the otherwise conservative South Coast region to vote for Kamala Harris by double digits.

== Education ==
Marion is a member of the 2,700-student Old Rochester Regional School District. The town, along with Mattapoisett and Rochester, operate as a single school system with each town having its own school subcommittee. Marion operates the Sippican School for students from pre-kindergarten to grade 6. Seventh- and eighth-grade students attend Old Rochester Regional Junior High School, and high school students attend Old Rochester Regional High School. Both regional schools are located on Route 6 in Mattapoisett, just over the Marion town line. The high school competes in the South Coast Conference for athletics. Their mascot is the bulldog, and their colors are red, black, and white. The town's Thanksgiving Day football rival is Apponequet Regional High School, in Lakeville. Marion students may also choose to attend Upper Cape Cod Regional Technical School, a technical high school located in Bourne on the Cape side of the canal.

The town is the site of Tabor Academy, a private academy serving grades 9–12.

== Infrastructure ==
As a small New England town the major infrastructures are the roads, water, and the waste disposal. Marion also has a fine harbor facility with a wide concrete vehicle accessible jetty. Boats can tie up on three sides to load and unload from vehicles right on the jetty. A wooden ramp runs from the jetty to the Harbormaster lookout. There is a large adjoining unpaved parking lot.

Marion is home to one of the largest sailing fleets in Massachusetts showing a forest of masts in the inner harbor. Directly adjacent to the Harbormaster is a small shellfish area which is stocked by the town.

There is a public beach at the end of Front St. It is groomed and has a lifeguard station. It also has a large parking lot.

The town Library (Elizabeth Taber Library) is on the ground floor of a colonial building next to the Town offices on Spring St.

=== Transportation ===
Interstate 195 passes through the town, and has an exit at Massachusetts Route 105. Route 105's southern terminus is at its intersection with U.S. Route 6, which also passes through the town.

The nearest regional bus and air service can be reached in New Bedford. The nearest national air service can be reached at T. F. Green Airport in Rhode Island, and the nearest international airport is Logan International Airport in Boston. There are no railroad services in town; the nearest rail service can be reached in Middleborough, at the terminus to the Middleborough-Lakeville line of the MBTA's commuter rail service. The nearest freight rail service is in Wareham.

== Military Industry ==
Until 2022, Marion was home to Lockheed Martin Sippican, which developed technology for undersea warfare (e.g. drones, torpedoes, antennae). The company was founded in 1940 as Francis Associates, went public as Sippican Ocean Systems, Inc. in 1981, and was acquired by Lockheed Martin in 2004.

== Notable people ==
- Benjamin Briggs, Master of the Mary Celeste
- Richard E. Byrd, Rear Admiral; first man to fly over both the North and South Poles, summer resident
- Grover Cleveland, President of the United States; summer resident
- Dom DiMaggio, Red Sox centerfielder
- Charles Dana Gibson, artist, creator of the "Gibson Girl" look
- Andrew A. Harwood, Rear Admiral; career naval officer
- Henry James, novelist
- Lucy Myers Wright Mitchell, first female classical archaeologist
- PJ Poulin, Major League Pitcher
- Frances Folsom Cleveland Preston, former first lady to United States President Grover Cleveland, summer resident
- Geraldo Rivera, summer resident
- Franklin Delano Roosevelt, President of the United States; summer resident
- Carl Ruggles, American composer, born in Marion
- Augustus Saint-Gaudens, sculptor, summer resident
- James Spader, summer resident
