= Mattapoisett, Massachusetts =

- Town
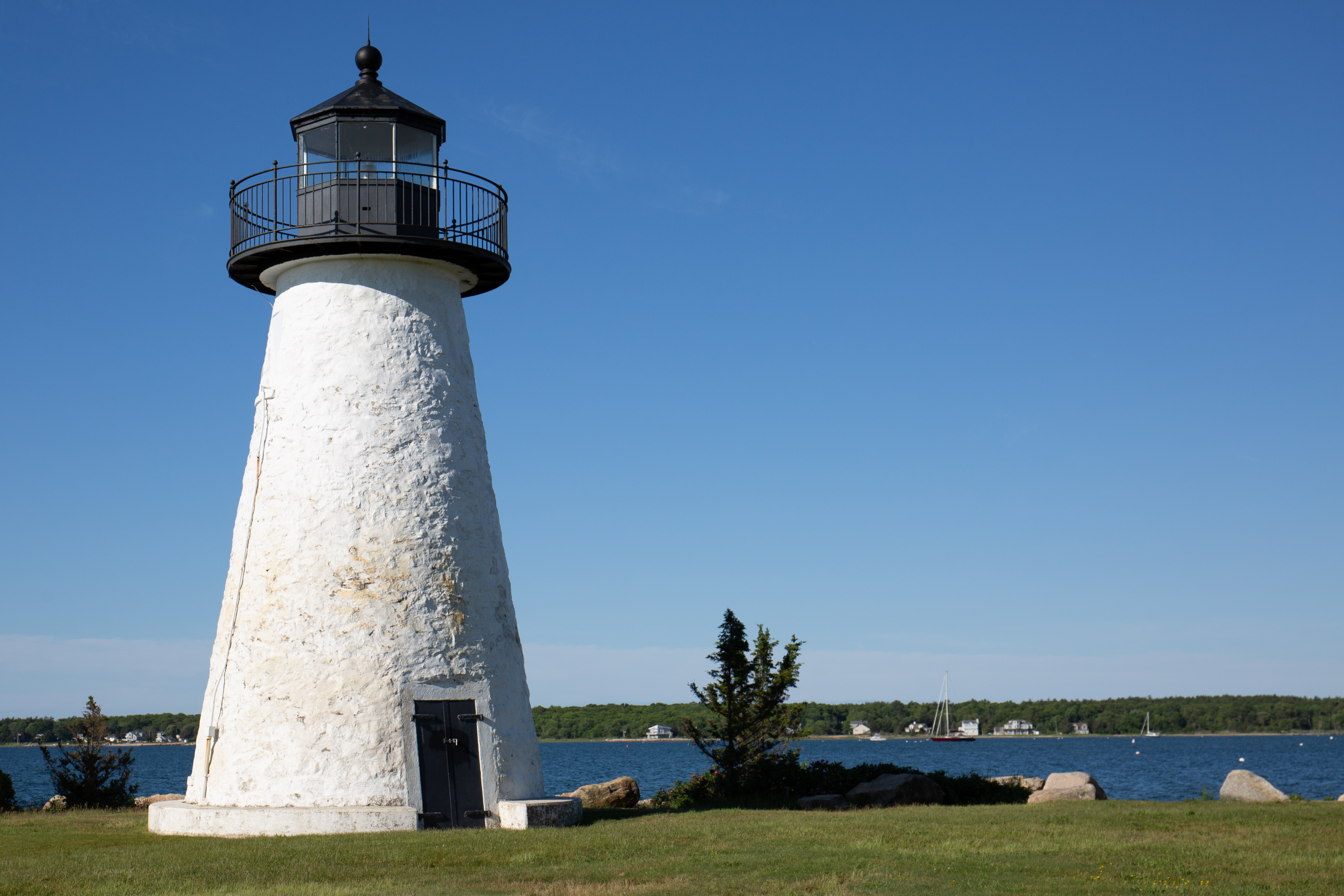
- Ned's Point Light

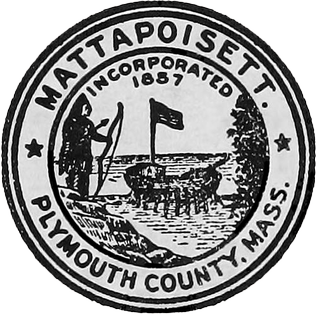
- Seal

- Location in Plymouth County in Massachusetts
- Coordinates: 41°39′30″N 70°49′00″W
- Country: United States
- State: Massachusetts
- County: Plymouth
- Settled: 1750
- Incorporated: May 21, 1857

Government
  - Type: Open town meeting

Area
  - Total: 24.2 sq mi (62.6 km^{2})
  - Land: 17.4 sq mi (45.0 km^{2})
  - Water: 6.8 sq mi (17.6 km^{2})
- Elevation: 26 ft (8 m)

Population (2020)
  - Total: 6,508
  - Density: 375/sq mi (145/km^{2})
- Time zone: UTC−5 (Eastern)
  - Summer (DST): UTC−4 (Eastern)
- ZIP Code: 02739
- Area code: 508/774
- FIPS code: 25-39450
- GNIS feature ID: 0619471
- Website: https://www.mattapoisett.gov/

Mattapoisett is a town in Plymouth County, Massachusetts, United States. The population was 6,508 at the 2020 census. Mattapoisett Center is located in the town.

Mattapoisett is a part of the South Coast region of Massachusetts which encompasses the cities and towns that surround Buzzards Bay (excluding the Elizabeth Islands, Bourne and Falmouth), Mount Hope Bay and the Sakonnet River.

== History ==
Governor William Brenton purchased Mattapoisett in 1664 from Wampanoag chief Metacomet, also referred to as King Philip. Brenton left it to his son Ebenezer, who sold it. The town of Mattapoisett was settled in 1750 and officially incorporated in 1857, originally a part of Rochester. There is evidence of prior Wampanoag Indian settlements throughout the town, including burial grounds. The name Mattapoisett is Wampanoag for "a place of resting".

Early industry included logging and farming, but Mattapoisett became best known for its role in the history of whaling. Some 400 ships were built in the town's shipyards from 1740 until the 1870s, including the Acushnet, the ship that Moby-Dick author Herman Melville sailed on and later deserted. The town supplied many of the whalers used on the East Coast in the first half of the nineteenth century. The last one was the Wanderer, built in 1878, shortly after the discovery of oil in Pennsylvania which led to the demise of commercial whaling in the United States.

With the decline of whaling and associated shipbuilding, Mattapoisett transitioned into a popular summer vacation spot for prominent New York and Boston residents, including Oliver Wendell Holmes Jr. Today, the town is largely a suburban community, with most residents commuting to jobs in Fall River, New Bedford, Worcester, Providence, or Boston, or operating businesses targeting summer tourism.

== Geography ==
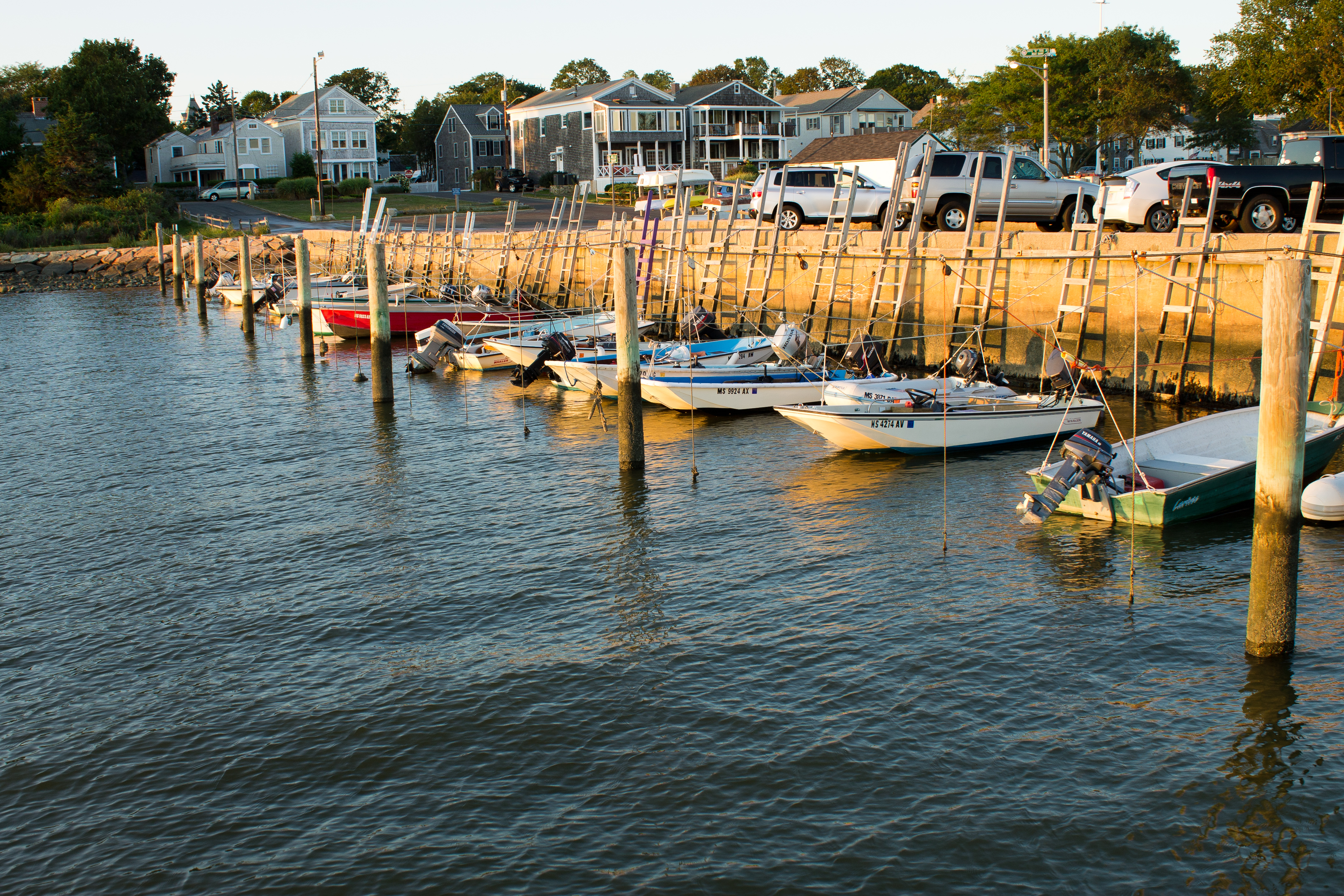
Mattapoisett Town Wharf

According to the United States Census Bureau, the town has a total area of 24.2 square miles (62.6 km^{2}), of which 17.4 square miles (45.0 km^{2}) is land and 6.8 square miles (17.6 km^{2}), or 28.18%, is water. The Mattapoisett River begins in Rochester and flows through town, emptying into Mattapoisett Harbor, an arm of Buzzards Bay. Mattapoisett is home to Haskell Swamp in the Tinkham Hill area in the northern part of town. The center of the town around the harbor is known as The Village, and a rural area north of rte 195, along Acushnet Road, Tinkham Lane and Long Plain Rd, is known as Tinkhamtown. There is also a state-managed wildlife area, Nasketucket Bay State Reservation, commonly known as Nunes Farm, along the waterfront near the Fairhaven line. There are four beaches and two parks along the waterfront, as well as Ned Point Light, which was built in 1837 and added to the National Register of Historic Places in 1987. The town is home to the Fin, Fur and Feather Club, a hunt club and shooting range located along the Mattapoisett River off Crystal Spring Road.

Mattapoisett is the southwesternmost town of Plymouth County. It is bordered by Fairhaven to the southwest, Acushnet to the northwest, Rochester to the north, and Marion to the east. Buzzards Bay lies to the south. The town is 9 miles (14 km) east of New Bedford, 38 miles (61 km) east-southeast of Providence, Rhode Island, and 60 miles (97 km) south of Boston.

== Transportation ==
Interstate 195 runs through the town, and U.S. Route 6, is the main local road through town. I-195 has an exit for the town, Exit 31A/B, "Mattapoisett/N. Rochester," which accesses North Street.

Regional bus service can be reached in New Bedford, as can regional air service. The nearest rail service is either in Providence or at the terminus of the New Bedford line of the MBTA's commuter rail service to Boston. The nearest national airline service can be found at T. F. Green Airport in Warwick, Rhode Island, and the nearest international service can be reached at Logan International Airport in Boston.

== Demographics ==
Historical population
Year	Pop.	±%
1860	1,483	—
1870	1,361	−8.2%
1880	1,365	+0.3%
1890	1,148	−15.9%
1900	1,061	−7.6%
1910	1,233	+16.2%
1920	1,277	+3.6%
1930	1,501	+17.5%
1940	1,608	+7.1%
1950	2,265	+40.9%
1960	3,117	+37.6%
1970	4,500	+44.4%
1980	5,597	+24.4%
1990	5,850	+4.5%
2000	6,268	+7.1%
2010	6,045	−3.6%
2020	6,508	+7.7%
2023*	6,652	+2.2%
* = population estimate. Source: United States Census records and Population Estimates Program data.

As of the 2010 census, there were 6,045 people, 2,505 households, and 1,740 families residing in the town. The population density was 380.4 inhabitants per square mile (146.9/km^{2}). There were 3,262 housing units at an average density of 192.5 per square mile (74.3/km^{2}). The racial makeup of the town was 96.1% White, 1.3% African American, 0.1% Native American, 0.6% Asian, 0% Pacific Islander, 1.2% from other races, and 1.2% from two or more races.

There were 2,532 households, out of which 30.2% had children under the age of 18 living with them, 57.7% were married couples living together, 9.6% had a female householder with no husband present, and 30.1% were non-families. Of all households 25.5% were made up of individuals, and 12.7% had someone living alone who was 65 years of age or older. The average household size was 2.46 and the average family size was 2.97.

Age distribution figures show 23.9% of the population under the age of 18, 4.5% from 18 to 24, 26.0% from 25 to 44, 29.0% from 45 to 64, and 16.6% who were 65 years of age or older. The median age was 42 years. For every 100 females, there were 92.0 males. For every 100 females age 18 and over, there were 88.9 males.

The median income for a household in the town was $101,487 as of 2021, and the per capita income was 68,526.§

The median income for a family was $68,246. Males had a median income of $48,100 versus $35,938 for females. About 2.8% of families and 2.1% of the population were below the poverty line, including 2.5% of those under age 18 and 3.2% of those age 65 or over.

== Government ==
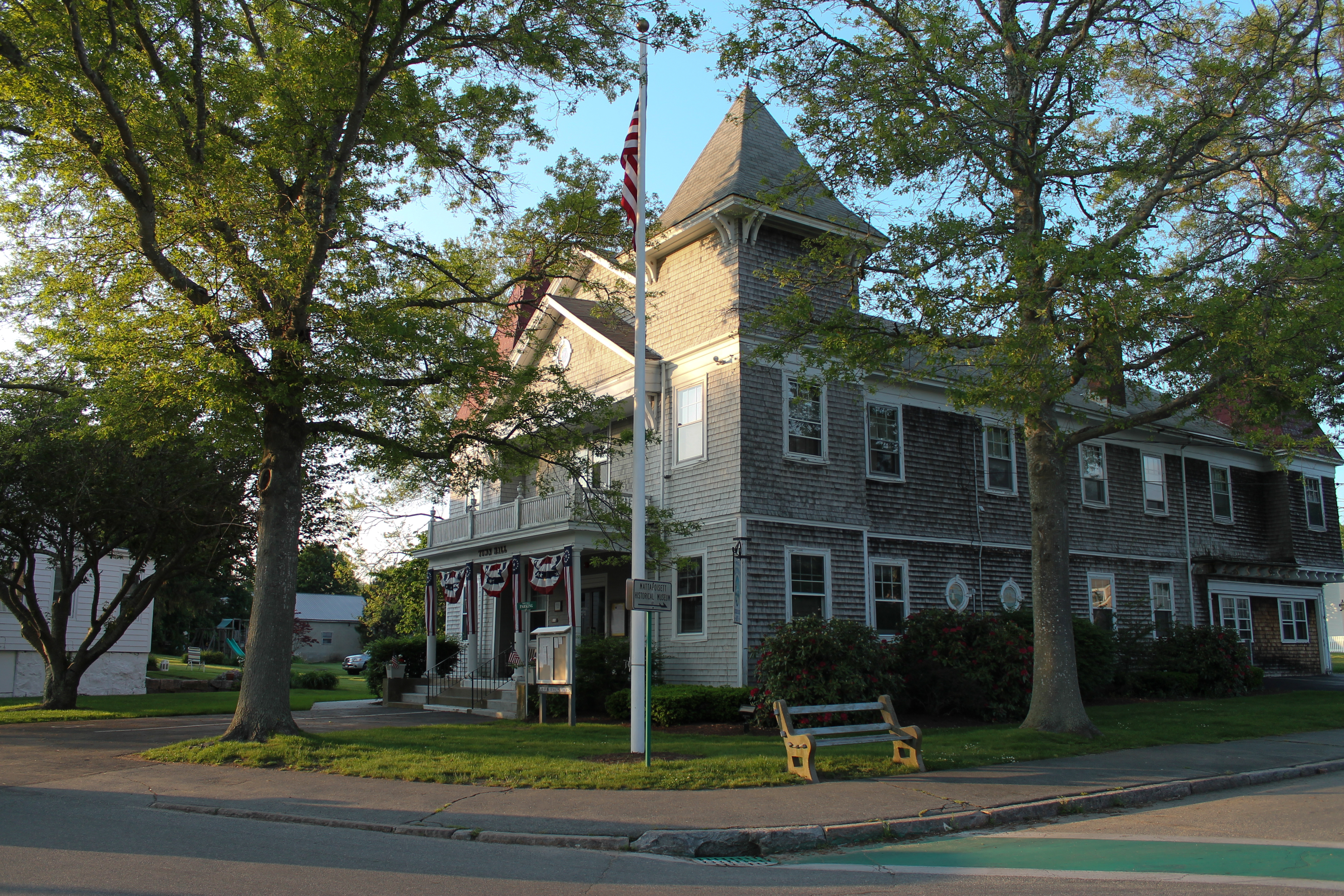
Mattapoisett Town Hall

Mattapoisett is represented in the Massachusetts House of Representatives by Mark Sylvia, as a part of the Tenth Bristol district, and in the Massachusetts Senate by Mark Montigny, as part of the Second Bristol and Plymouth district. In the US House of Representatives, Mattapoisett is a part of Massachusetts's 9th congressional district, and is currently represented by William R. Keating. In the US Senate is Elizabeth Warren and the junior senator is Ed Markey.

Mattapoisett uses the open town meeting form of government, led by a board of selectmen. The town hall is located on Main Street, between Route 6 and the harbor. The town has its own highly educated full-time police department and on-call fire department, both headquartered on Route 6. The Mattapoisett Police Department runs the emergency medical system (EMS) for the town with it being one of the last towns among the Commonwealth to have a police-based EMS system. All police officers are required to be at minimum EMT-Basics while some members of the police are EMT-Paramedics. The EMS also has civilian EMT-Paramedic members who reside in the community. The Mattapoisett Free Public Library, located on Barstow Street, is a member of the SAILS Library Network, the Southeastern Massachusetts Library System (SEMLS), and the Massachusetts Library Internet Network (MLIN).

== Education ==
Mattapoisett is a member of the 2,700-student Old Rochester Regional School District. The town, along with Marion and Rochester, operate a single school system with each town having its own school subcommittee. Mattapoisett operates the Center School for prekindergarten through third grade students, and the Old Hammondtown School for grades 4–6. Seventh- and eighth-grade students attend Old Rochester Regional Junior High School, and high school students attend Old Rochester Regional High School. Both regional schools are located on Route 6 in Mattapoisett, near the Marion town line. The high school, commonly known as "O.R.R.," competes in the South Coast Conference for athletics. Their mascot is the bulldog, and their colors are red and white. The town's Thanksgiving Day football rival is Apponequet Regional High School in Lakeville.

In addition to public schools, high school students may also choose to attend Old Colony Regional Vocational Technical High School, located in Rochester. The nearest private schools are Tabor Academy in Marion and Bishop Stang High School in Dartmouth.

Prior to the opening of the Old Rochester Regional High School in 1961, students in grades 10–12 attended Fairhaven High School in Fairhaven.

== In literature ==
In Marge Piercy's 1976 novel Woman on the Edge of Time, Mattapoisett is imagined as a utopian community in 2137.

== Notable people ==
- Robert Brink (1924–2014), violinist, conductor, and professor at the New England Conservatory in Boston, Massachusetts.
- Raymond Gilmartin (1929–2013), President and CEO of Merck & Co, Inc., 1994–2005.
- Oliver Wendell Holmes Jr. (1841–1935), United States Supreme Court Justice.
- Francis Davis Millet (1848–1912), artist born in Mattapoisett and who died on the Titanic.
- Milton Silveira (1929–2013), Chief Engineer of NASA.
- Geoff Smith (1953), Boston Marathon winner, 1984–1985
- Rufus Albertson Soule (1839–1913), businessman and state politician.
- Elizabeth Drew Stoddard (1823–1902), American poet and novelist, author of The Morgesons.
- Peter Uihlein (1989), 2010 U.S. Amateur Golf Champion.
- Sam Waterston (born 1940), Academy Award nominated and Golden Globe winning actor.
- Conrad Henri Roy III (1995–2014), American man who died by suicide at the age of 18 with encouragement from his girlfriend.
- Sarah Rogers Atsatt (1888 - 1971) American herpetologist.
