= Tremont Mill Pond =

Pond in Wareham, Massachusetts, US

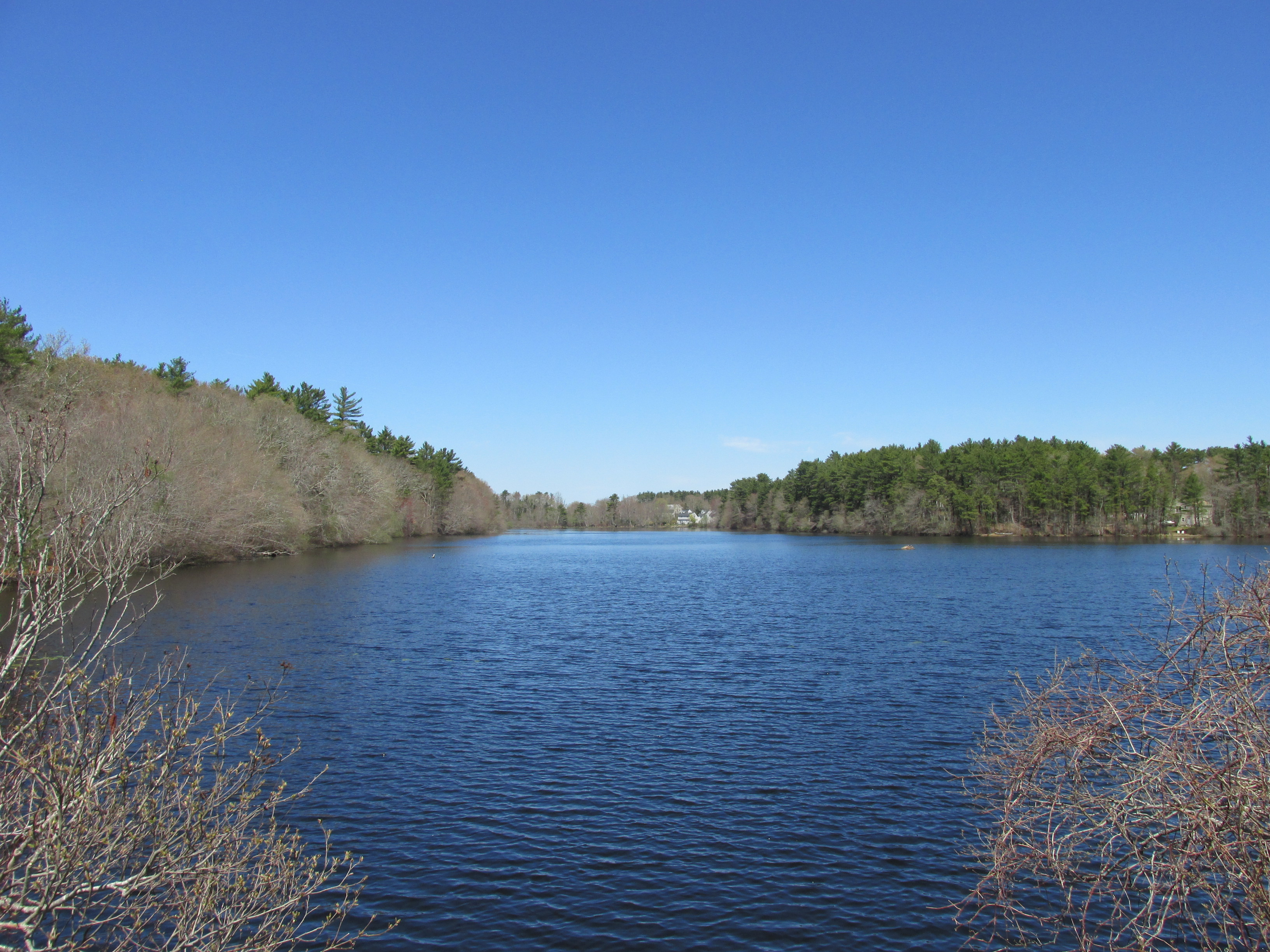
- Tremont Mill Pond

- Location within Massachusetts
- Location: Wareham, Massachusetts
- Coordinates: 41°47′36″N 70°45′51″W
- Primary inflows: Weweantic River
- Primary outflows: Weweantic River
- Basin countries: United States
- Surface area: 50 acres (20 ha)
- Settlements: West Wareham, Tremont

Tremont Mill Pond is a 50-acre (200,000 m^{2}) pond in Wareham, Massachusetts, in the West Wareham section of town. The Weweantic River flows through the pond. Route 28 runs north of the pond. Tremont village is located southwest of the pond. The water quality is impaired due to non-native fish in the pond.
