= Tremont Nail Factory District =

Historic district in Massachusetts, United States

- U.S. National Register of Historic Places
- U.S. Historic district
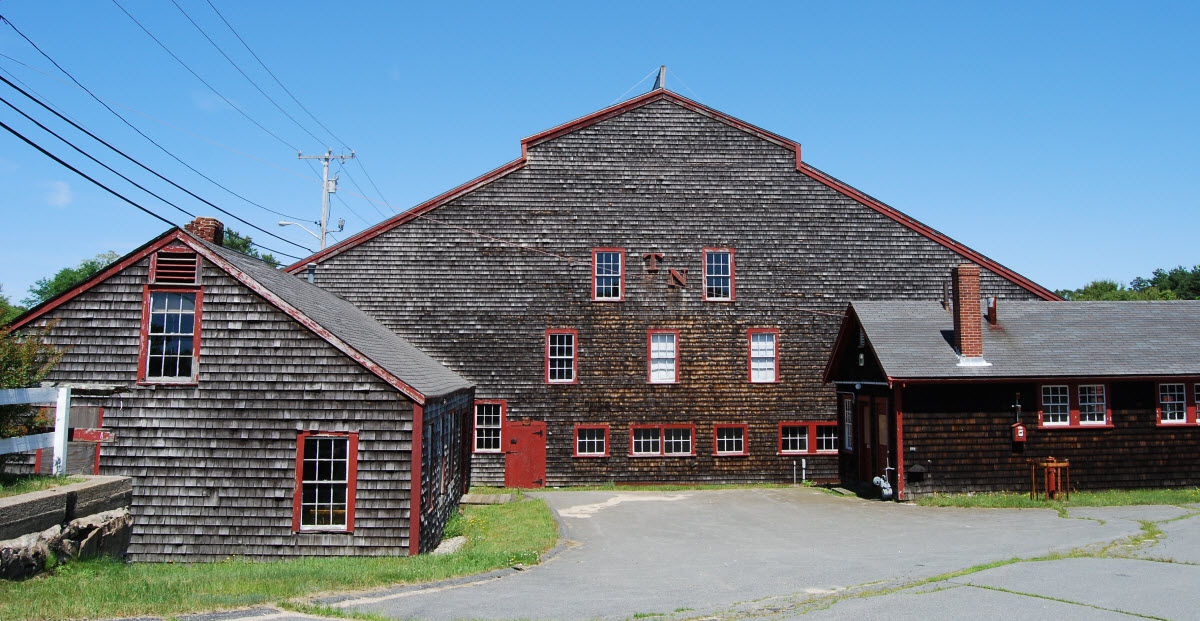

- Location within Massachusetts Location within the United States
- Location: 21 Elm Street, Wareham, Massachusetts
- Coordinates: 41°45′59″N 70°43′20″W
- Built: 1848
- Architectural style: Federal
- NRHP reference No.: 76001964
- Added to NRHP: October 22, 1976

Tremont Nail Factory District is a historic district in Wareham, Massachusetts. It makes up the area occupied by the former Tremont Nail Company.

In the early 19th century, Parker Mills was constructed by shipwrights as a cotton mill. During the War of 1812, it was partially burned by the British. In 1819, another building was constructed on the site of the former mill by Isaac and Jared Pratt to manufacture nails. At this time, the Parker Mills Nail Company was born. The mill was partially destroyed by fire again in 1836. Reconstruction was completed in 1848, and the buildings have not changed much since.

The bell in the cupola in the original facility bears a date of 1851. The main mill is one of five buildings at the site over 100 years old. There are also 60 nail machines in the building, many over 125 years old. Until the 1920s, a water wheel powered the mill's overhead shafting.

The district was added to the National Register of Historic Places in 1976.

== See also ==
- Bridgewater Iron Works
- National Register of Historic Places listings in Plymouth County, Massachusetts
- Old Colony Iron Works-Nemasket Mills Complex
