= Tremont Nail Company =

Coordinates: 41°45′59.45″N 70°43′21.27″W

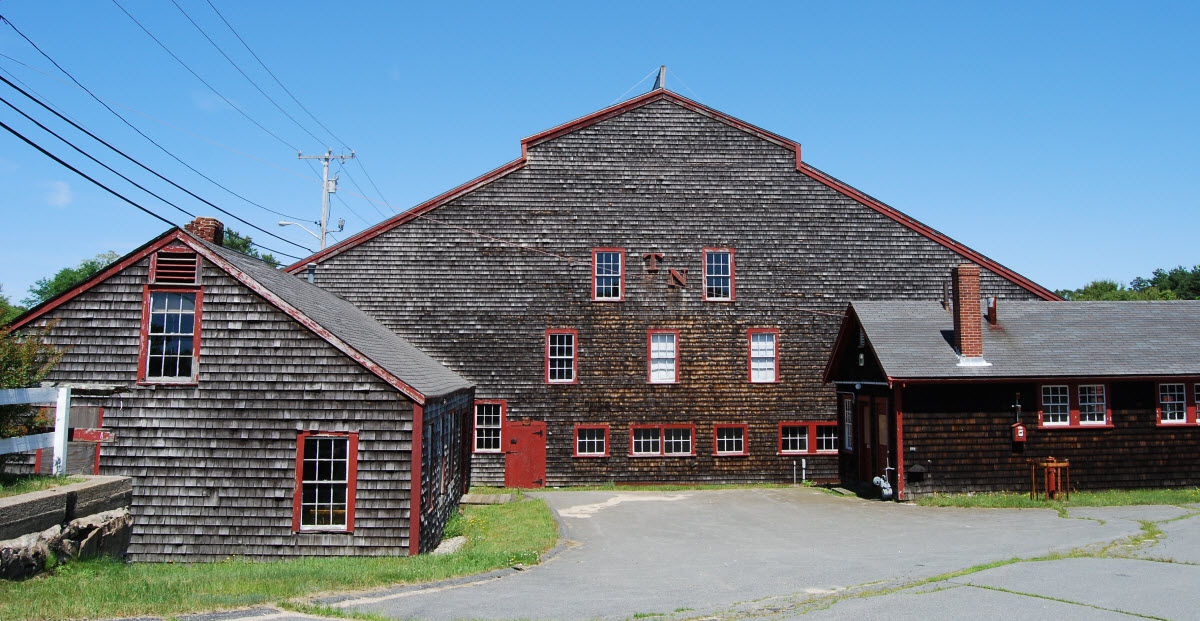
Former Tremont Nail Company site, Wareham, Massachusetts

The Tremont Nail Company was a nail manufacturing company located in Wareham, Massachusetts, from 1819 to 2006. The Tremont Nail brand was purchased by Acorn Manufacturing of Mansfield, Massachusetts, where it still produces cut nails and other products for restoration projects. They are the oldest manufacturer of steel cut nails in the United States.

== History ==
In the early 19th century, Parker Mills was constructed by shipwrights as a cotton mill. During the War of 1812, it was partially burned by the British. In 1819, another building was constructed on the site of the former mill by Isaac and Jared Pratt to manufacture nails. At this time, the Parker Mills Nail Company was born. The mill was partially destroyed by fire again in 1836. Reconstruction was completed in 1848 and the buildings haven't changed much since. The bell in the cupola in the original facility bears a date of 1851. The main mill is one of five buildings at the site over 100 years old. There are also 60 nail machines in the building, many over 125 years old. Until the 1920s, the mill was also powered by a water wheel which powered overhead shafting. In 1976, the buildings at the facility were added to the Tremont Nail Factory District.

== The mill complex today ==
In 2006, the company moved to Mansfield, Massachusetts, after being acquired by Acorn Manufacturing. The town of Wareham bought the complex in 2004 in what was called a risky gamble. In 2007, the town decided to invest in the upkeep of the mills so that the elements don't claim the structure.

== See also ==
- Bridgewater Iron Works
- Old Colony Iron Works
- Nahum Stetson
