= Blackmore Pond =

- Location within Massachusetts Location within the United States
- Location: Wareham, Massachusetts
- Coordinates: 41°45′22″N 70°45′08″W
- Type: reservoir
- Basin countries: United States
- Surface area: 46 acres (19 ha)
- Surface elevation: 16 ft (5 m)
- Settlements: South Wareham

Blackmore Pond is a 46-acre (190,000 m^{2}) Massachusetts-designated great pond in Wareham, Massachusetts, United States, in the South Wareham section of town. The pond is located south of Horseshoe Pond and west of the Weweantic River. Interstate 195 runs southeast of the pond.
