= Cohannet Mill No. 3 =

Historic place in Massachusetts, United States

- U.S. National Register of Historic Places
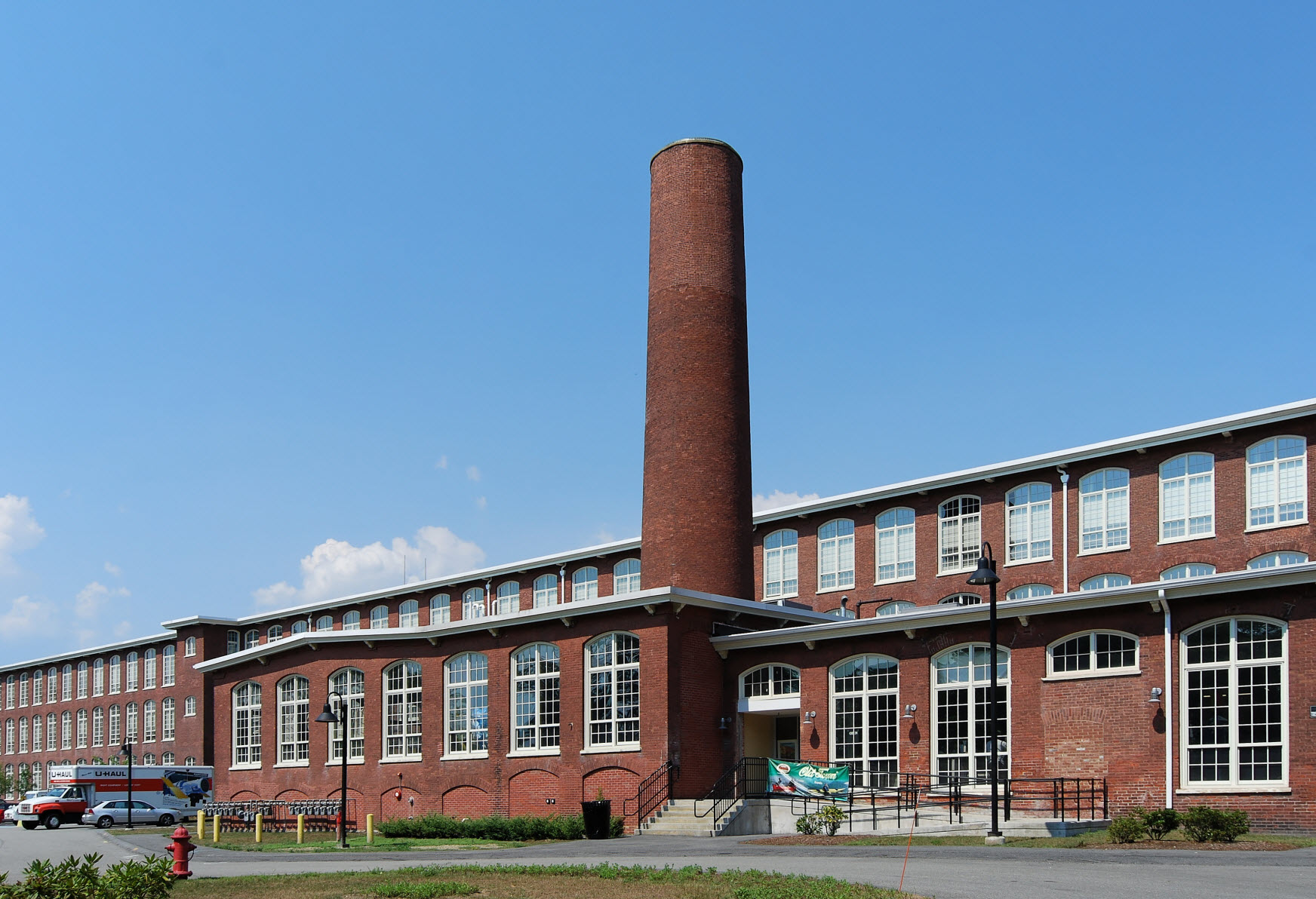
- Cohannet Mill No. 3

- Location within Massachusetts Location within the United States
- Location: Taunton, Massachusetts
- Coordinates: 41°53′14″N 71°5′13″W
- Built: 1890
- NRHP reference No.: 06001088
- Added to NRHP: November 29, 2006

The Cohannet Mill No. 3 is an historic textile mill located at 120 Ingell Street in Taunton, Massachusetts. The mill was built in 1890 and added to the National Register of Historic Places in 2006. It is the only remaining mill of the Cohannet Mills company, founded in 1847 for the manufacture of fine cotton yarns.

The site has been cleaned up and restored and is now known as "Robertson on the River", with 64 affordable, loft-style apartments and 18,000 square feet (1,700 m^{2}) of business space.

== Cohannet Mills ==
The Cohannet Mills were incorporated in 1847 with an initial capital of $100,000. The first mill was built at Adams Street in Taunton, on the banks of the Mill River. Opened the following year, Mill No. 1 was 333 feet long by 50 feet wide, with two stories. John E. Sanford served as the company's first president. In 1881, the capital was increased to $200,000, and Mill No. 2 was erected nearby. It was 365 feet long by 72 feet wide with three stories. The two mills were steam powered and manufactured fine cotton yarn for hosiery. By 1887, they contained 30,800 spindles and employed 250 people.

The athletic fields for Coyle and Cassidy High School now occupy the site of Cohannet Mills No. 1 and 2. The school building is located on what was Poole Mills.

== Site history ==
Cohannet Mill No. 3 was built along the banks of the Taunton River at Weir Village, away from the company's other two mills. In 1899 it was acquired by New England Cotton Yarn Company, along with the Nemasket Mills at East Taunton. The New England Cotton Yarn Company also owned several mills in Fall River, New Bedford and North Dighton, Massachusetts. The company's two Taunton mills were sold in June, 1916. The former Cohannet Mill No. 3 was sold to William Butler, who renamed it Nemasket Mill. The former Nemasket Mill (on Old Colony Avenue) was sold to the Connecticut Cotton Mills Company.

With the help of an EPA Grant in 2001, the site, also known as Robertson Mills, was cleaned up and converted into residences. The complex also contains the offices of the Neighborhood Corporation, non-profit group (formerly known as Weir Corporation). The project received an award from the Massachusetts Historical Commission in 2006 for adaptive reuse.

== See also ==
- National Register of Historic Places listings in Taunton, Massachusetts
