= Sippican River =

River in Massachusetts

Coordinates: 41.738°N 70.749°W

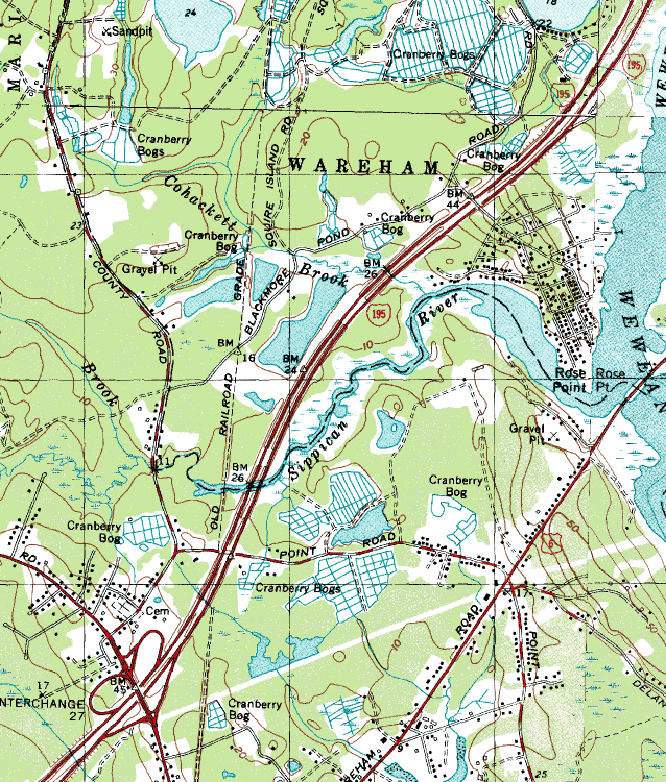
Lower stretches of the Sippican River.

The Sippican River ('long river') is a short river in Massachusetts, United States.

The Sippican River is 6.2 miles (10.0 km) long, arising from east and west branches in the towns of Mattapoisett, Marion (once known as Sippican), and Rochester, Massachusetts. Each branch flows through a complex system of cranberry bogs and reservoirs, and empties a short distance away through Wareham into Buzzards Bay near the Weweantic River mouth.

As of 2006, efforts are underway to restore the native alewife population to the river.

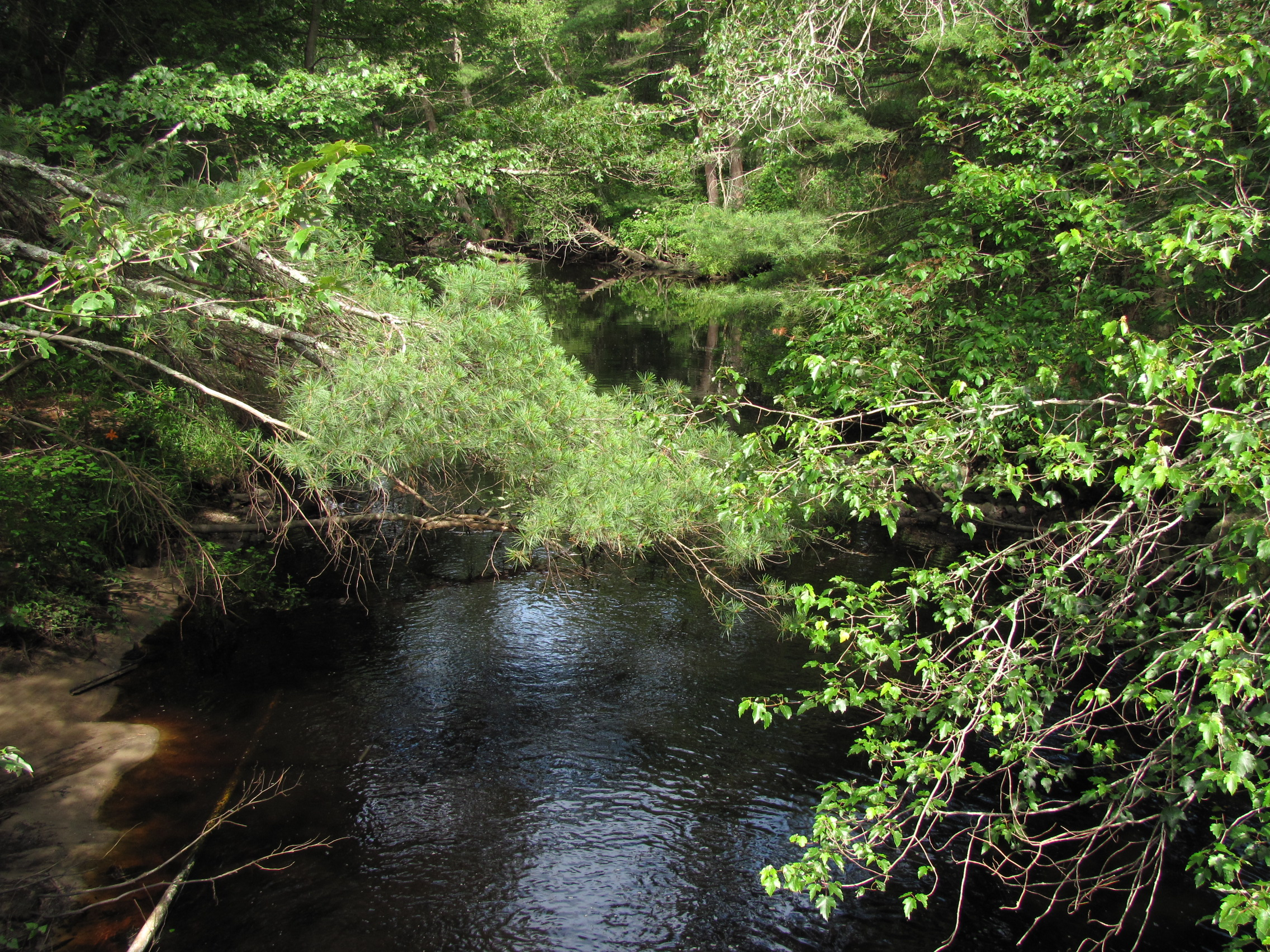
Downstream from Country Road between Wareham and Marion
