= Stephen Cooper (American football) =

American football player (born 1979)

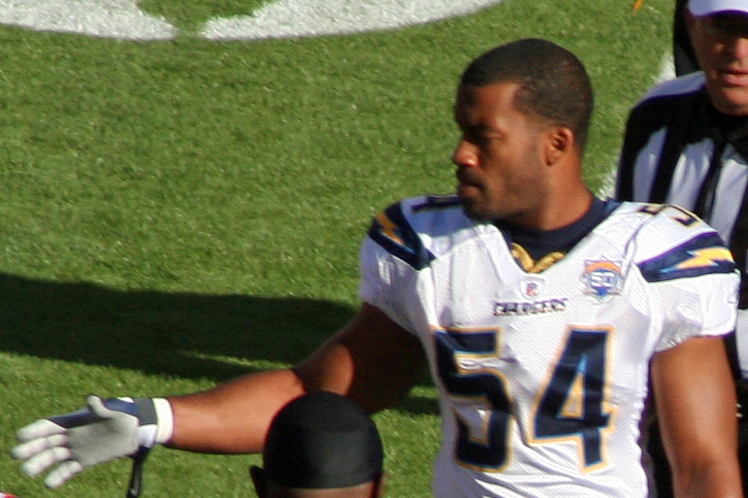
- Cooper with the San Diego Chargers in 2009

No. 54
- Position: Linebacker

Personal information
- Born: June 19, 1979 (age 47); Wareham, Massachusetts, U.S.
- Listed height: 6 ft 1 in (1.85 m)
- Listed weight: 235 lb (107 kg)

Career information
- High school: Wareham
- College: Maine
- NFL draft: 2003: undrafted

Career history
- San Diego Chargers (2003–2011)

Awards and highlights
- 2× A-10 Defensive POY (2001, 2002); George H. "Bulger" Lowe Award (2002)

Career NFL statistics
- Total tackles: 503
- Sacks: 9.5
- Forced fumbles: 8
- Fumble recoveries: 5
- Interceptions: 8
- Stats at Pro Football Reference

Stephen Cooper (born June 19, 1979) is an American former professional football player who was a linebacker for the San Diego Chargers of the National Football League (NFL). He played college football for the Maine Black Bears. He was signed by the Chargers as an undrafted free agent in 2003, and played his entire professional career for the Chargers.

== College career ==
Cooper verbally committed to attend the U.S. Naval Academy but transferred closer to home at the University of Maine to try and earn a scholarship. In an interview with Tom Shanahan, Cooper said his decision was a family one. "We weren't really thinking about professional football," Cooper said, "We were thinking about a job after college, and if you go to the Naval Academy, you're not going to get turned away for a job." Because his high school coach and Maine Black Bears football head coach Jack Cosgrove played together in college, Cooper was offered a scholarship and became an instant star. Cooper earned Maine's Roger Ellis Rookie of Year Award his freshman year in 1999. As a junior, Cooper earned Atlantic-10 Co-Defensive Player of Year. During his senior year, Cooper racked up Atlantic-10 Conference Defensive Player of Year in 2002, the George H. "Bulger" Lowe award from the Gridiron Club of Greater Boston as the top defensive football player in New England, and was named a 1st Team Defense 2002 Associated Press NCAA Division I-AA Football All-American. He was also an American Football Coaches Association and Sports Network All-American as well.

In a game against Appalachian State, Cooper was named an I-AA All Star where he "turned the game around late in the third quarter, forcing ASU quarterback Joe Burchette into an interception with Maine trailing 10-0. The Black Bears scored two plays later and pulled out a 14-13 win. Cooper had 13 tackles, three solo and 10 assisted, three tackles for 15 yards of losses and two quarterback sacks for 14 yards of losses." Throughout his college career spanning four years from 1999 to 2002, Cooper finished with 374 tackles, 57 tackles for loss, seven interceptions and 25 sacks.

=== 2002 steroid possession ===
A week after being named the top defensive player in New England, Cooper was caught with possession of about 1,000 steroid pills on November 1, 2002. He was riding in a car that was speeding on I-95 in Hampden, Maine. The driver, Patrick Kenney, allowed Trooper Michael Johnson to search the car in which he found the pills in a duffel bag sitting on the rear seat. Cooper was not penalized for participation of any games during his senior year as possession of steroids did not violate NCAA rules. A New York Times report stated "NCAA spokeswoman, Laronica L. Conway, said the illegal possession of steroids was an issue for the institution to resolve. There is no violation of NCAA bylaws unless a player is accused of actually ingesting the pills, not simply possessing them, she said from the association's headquarters in Indianapolis."

The University of Maine star pleaded guilty in federal court to possession of steroids. Cooper was released following his plea to the misdemeanor offense, and issued a statement saying he had planned not to use the drugs.

== Professional career ==
The San Diego Chargers signed Cooper as an undrafted free agent on May 2, 2003. He played in mostly a backup role for his first 4 years before his breakout season in 2007 when he started all 16 games and recorded a career high 107 tackles. The following two seasons were also productive totaling 201 tackles and starting 28 games. He was placed on IR on December 31, 2010, after playing 12 games (11 starts) and recording 43 tackles during the 2010 season. He played 5 more games the following year before another injury cut his season short, being placed on IR on October 12, 2011. He would spend his entire 9 season career in San Diego recording 503 tackles, 9.5 sacks, and 8 interceptions in 125 games. He also recorded 68 tackles, 0.5 sack, and 2 passes defended in 8 playoff games for the Chargers.

== NFL career statistics ==
Legend
**Bold**	Career high

=== Regular season ===
Year	Team	Games		Tackles					Interceptions					Fumbles			
Year	Team	GP	GS	Cmb	Solo	Ast	Sck	TFL	Int	Yds	TD	Lng	PD	FF	FR	Yds	TD
2003	SDG	**16**	0	16	13	3	1.0	1	1	**25**	0	**25**	1	0	0	0	0
2004	SDG	**16**	2	42	32	10	0.0	2	0	0	0	0	2	0	1	0	0
2005	SDG	**16**	2	39	29	10	1.5	1	0	0	0	0	0	0	0	0	0
2006	SDG	**16**	4	54	31	23	**2.5**	3	0	0	0	0	2	1	0	0	0
2007	SDG	**16**	**16**	**107**	**72**	**35**	2.0	**5**	2	23	0	18	6	**3**	**2**	-1	0
2008	SDG	12	12	99	**72**	27	1.5	3	**4**	11	0	10	6	0	0	0	0
2009	SDG	**16**	**16**	102	71	31	0.0	2	0	0	0	0	**8**	2	**2**	0	0
2010	SDG	12	11	43	37	6	1.0	0	1	2	0	2	6	2	0	0	0
2011	SDG	5	0	1	0	1	0.0	0	0	0	0	0	0	0	0	0	0
		125	63	503	357	146	9.5	17	8	61	0	25	31	8	5	-1	0

=== Playoffs ===
Year	Team	Games		Tackles					Interceptions					Fumbles			
Year	Team	GP	GS	Cmb	Solo	Ast	Sck	TFL	Int	Yds	TD	Lng	PD	FF	FR	Yds	TD
2004	SDG	1	0	7	5	2	0.0	0	0	0	0	0	**1**	0	0	0	0
2006	SDG	1	0	1	0	1	0.0	0	0	0	0	0	**1**	0	0	0	0
2007	SDG	**3**	**3**	**30**	**24**	6	**0.5**	0	0	0	0	0	0	0	0	0	0
2008	SDG	2	2	21	12	**9**	0.0	0	0	0	0	0	0	0	0	0	0
2009	SDG	1	1	9	7	2	0.0	0	0	0	0	0	0	0	0	0	0
		8	6	68	48	20	0.5	0	0	0	0	0	2	0	0	0	0
