= Bourne High School =

Coordinates: 41.7385°N 70.5908°W

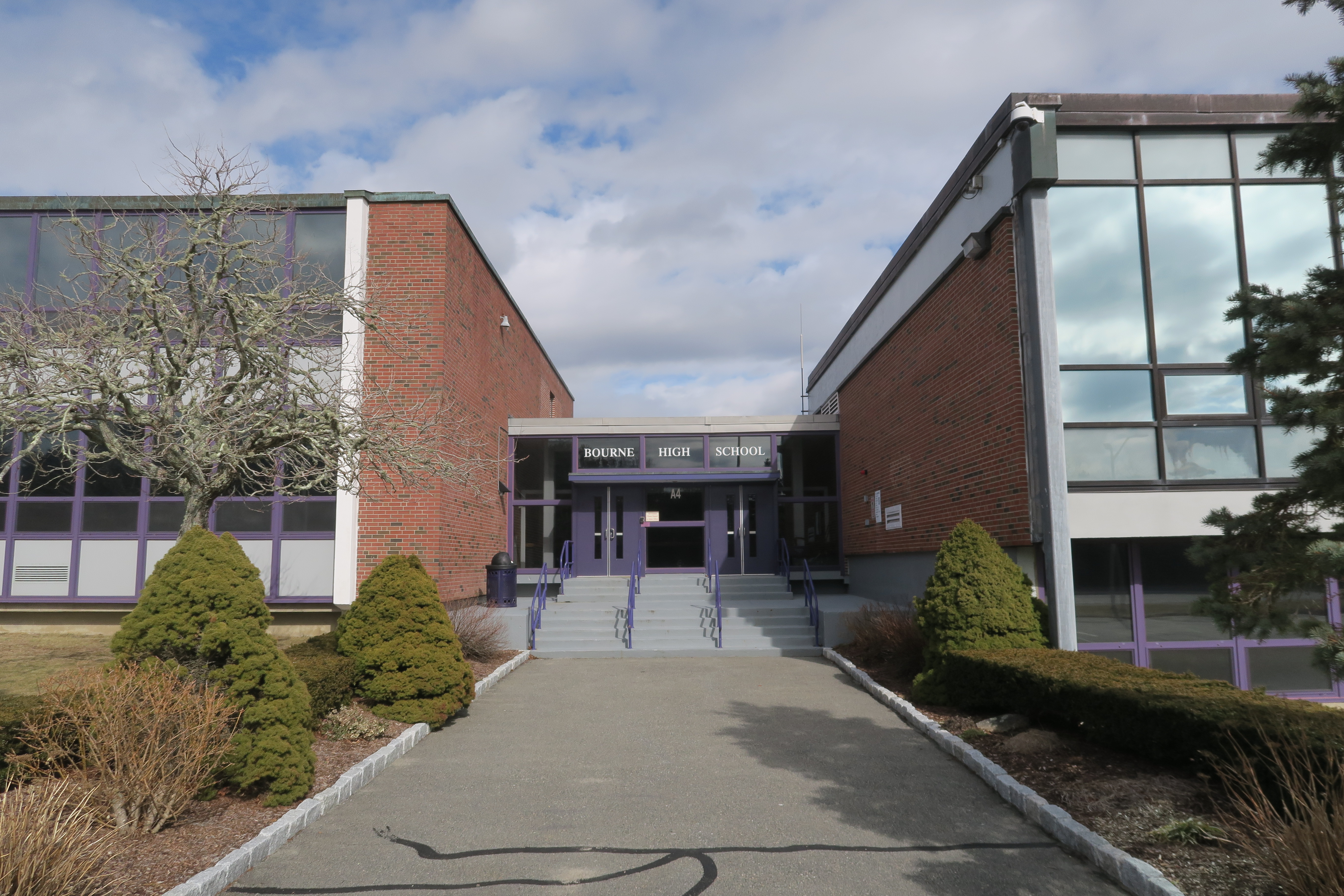
- 75 Waterhouse Road, Bourne, MA 02532

Information
- Type: Public; Open enrollment
- Established: 1951
- Principal: Lisa Maguire
- Teaching staff: 35.8 (FTE)
- Grades: 9-12
- Enrollment: 341 (2024-2025)
- Student to teacher ratio: 9.5
- Campus: Suburban
- Colors: Purple & White
- Mascot: Canalmen
- Rivals: Wareham, Old Rochester, Sandwich
- Newspaper: Bourne High School Dispatch
- Website: https://high.bourneps.org/

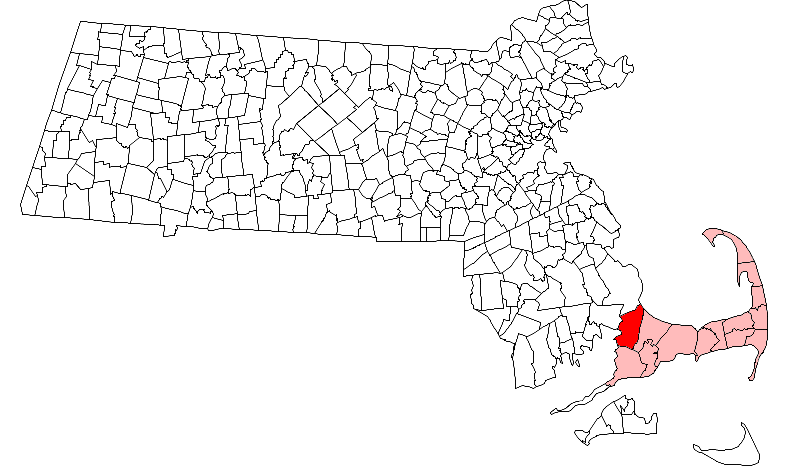
Map of Massachusetts towns with Bourne highlighted.

Bourne High School is a public high school located in Bourne, Massachusetts. It is located about 1 mile west of the famous Bourne Bridge and "Cape Cod" topiary at the Bourne Bridge rotary that welcomes people crossing the Cape Cod Canal.

== Demographics ==
According to Massachusetts Department of Elementary and Secondary Education annual statistics, for the 2024-25 academic year, the demographic enrollment distributions for race, gender and grade level at Bourne High School are as follows:

Total number of enrolled students: 341
Total number of full-time equivalent educators: 35.8
Therefore, the student to teacher ratio for this school is 9.5:1

Enrollment by Race/Ethnicity (2024-25)
Race	Enrolled Pupils*	% of District
African American	5	1.5%
Asian	11	3.2%
Hispanic	24	7.0%
Native American	5	1.5%
White	268	78.6%
Native Hawaiian, Pacific Islander	0	0.0%
Multi-Race, Non-Hispanic	28	8.2%
Total	341	100%

* Approximate number of enrolled pupils is calculated based on total number of students in district, multiplied by reported percentage, and rounded to nearest whole student.

Enrollment by gender (2024-25)
Gender	Enrolled pupils	Percentage
Female	182	53.37%
Male	159	46.63%
Non-binary	0	0%
Total	341	100%

Enrollment by Grade
Grade	Pupils Enrolled	Percentage
9	89	26.1%
10	78	22.87%
11	80	23.46%
12	85	24.93%
SP*	9	2.64%
Total	341	100%

* SP = Special Education Beyond Grade 12

== Sports ==
Bourne is known for its strong boys' hockey teams and girls volleyball teams, which have won and participated in multiple state championship games. They play their home games at the John Gallo Arena, which hosts many of the state's post-season high school hockey games.

The hockey accomplishments are as follows:

- State Champions - 2004
- State Finalists - 1990, 2003
- EMass Regional Champions - 1990, 2003, 2004

Also notable is the girls' volleyball team, who won state championships in 2000, 2004, 2018, and 2024.

The football team went undefeated in the regular season in 1965, 1980, 2004, and 2011. In 2011, they won the Division 3A State Championship for the first time in the school's history and had the teams only perfect season.

Timothy Crowley entered the Cape Cod Lacrosse Hall of Fame in 2023 due to his great success as a head coach of the program here.

The baseball team won the state championship in 2023.

The 2023-24 Boys' Basketball team lost in the Division 4 Championship Game. This was their first Finals appearance since 1959.

Bourne high school also offers programs such as Football, Field Hockey, Cross Country, Soccer, Basketball, Winter track, Lacrosse, Spring Track, Softball, and Baseball.
