= Nahum Stetson =

American politician

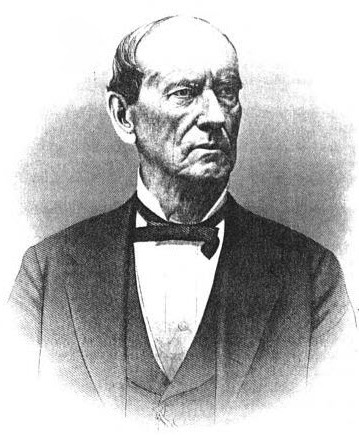
- Born: August 21, 1807; East Bridgewater, Massachusetts
- Died: October 6, 1894 (aged 87); Bridgewater, Massachusetts
- Occupation: businessman
- Employer(s): Bridgewater Iron Company; Weymouth Iron Company; Parker Iron Mills
- Spouse(s): Sarah Wilson Barstow (November 13, 1828); Lucy Ann Forester Barstow (July 4, 1843); Mary Louise Elliott (1888)
- Parent(s): Abisha Stetson (1773-1842) and Alice Allen

Signature
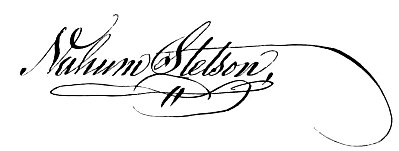

Nahum Stetson (August 21, 1807 - October 6, 1894) was a businessman from southeastern Massachusetts during the 19th century. He is best known for his role in establishing the Bridgewater Iron Company as one of the largest iron works in the United States during the mid-1800s. Stetson was also involved in several other iron companies throughout the southeastern New England region, as well as other notable businesses, including banks and railroads. His grandson, Nahum Stetson (1856-1933) was part of the Steinway & Sons piano company, as part of its sales team and board of directors.

== Personal life ==
Nahum Stetson was born in 1807 to Captain Abisha Stetson and Alice (Allen) Stetson. He was the fifth of eight children. His father had been among the founders of the Marshfield Cotton Factory, along with Jonathan Stetson and Jacob Perkins. Nahum attended local schools, finishing with two years at Bridgewater Academy. He then went to work at a mercantile house in Boston. After about four years, he returned to Bridgewater in 1825 to work in the store of Lazell, Perkins & Company.

Stetson married for the first time on November 13, 1828 to Sarah Wilson Barstow, of Pembroke. The couple had five children together, including three sons who live into adulthood: George Barstow, Nahum, Jr. and William Butler. His three sons would follow their father into the employ of the Bridgewater Iron Company. Sarah Stetson died in 1842.

Nahum's second marriage was to Lucy Ann Forester Barstow, sister of Sarah, on July 4, 1843. Together they had five children, three who died in infancy. Stetson married for the third time, on December 5, 1888 to Mary Louise Elliott of Bridgewater.

== Career ==
In 1835, after the death of Nathan Lazell, he was elected treasurer of the company. He set upon expansion of the company, which by then had been incorporated as the Bridgewater Iron Manufacturing Company. Under Stetson's leadership, the company became one of the largest iron works in the country by about 1860. The company, which specialized in heavy forgings and castings, had the capacity to produce major parts for the warships of the United States Navy, which could be produced few other places. The list of ships with parts made at Bridgewater include the USS Monitor, the USS New Ironsides and much of the fleet of the Pacific Mail Steamship Company.

Stetson was elected treasurer of the Weymouth Iron Company in 1841. In 1846, he took over control of the Parker Iron Mills (Tremont Iron Works) in Wareham, Massachusetts. In 1847, Stetson was among the incorporators of the Dean Cotton Machine Company in Taunton, Massachusetts. He also served as a director of the Bristol County Bank in Taunton, as well as the Taunton Locomotive Manufacturing Company, which he became president of in 1883, after the death of Samuel L. Crocker.

In 1854, Stetson purchased the Providence Iron Company, where he served as president until 1874. He was also a director of the Old Colony Iron Works at East Taunton, and among the original incorporators of the Fall River Railroad, which provided the first rail connection from the Bridgewater Works to the outside world. Stetson was also involved in the establishment of the Cape Cod Branch Railroad in 1846, to provide a rail link to the Parker Mills in Wareham. These lines would later become part of the Old Colony Railroad.

Stetson also served Bridgewater as a representative in the Massachusetts General Court from 1838-39.

In 1871, Stetson, along with a group of investors from Providence and Boston purchased the Mount Hope Iron Works in Somerset, Massachusetts for $120,000, which had been built in 1856 by Job M. Leonard.
