= Joshua Onujiogu =

American football player (born 1998)

Profile
- Position: Linebacker

Personal information
- Born: March 3, 1998 (age 28); Wareham, Massachusetts, U.S.
- Listed height: 6 ft 3 in (1.91 m)
- Listed weight: 252 lb (114 kg)

Career information
- High school: Wareham
- College: Framingham State (2016–2021)
- NFL draft: 2022: undrafted

Career history
- Seattle Seahawks (2022–2024)

Awards and highlights
- MASCAC Defensive Player of the Year (2019, 2021); First-team All-MASCAC (2019, 2021); All-New England First-Team (2021)

Career NFL statistics as of 2024
- Total tackles: 3
- Stats at Pro Football Reference

Joshua Onujiogu (born March 3, 1998) is an American professional football linebacker of the National Football League (NFL). He played college football for the Framingham State Rams.

== College career ==
Onujiogu played college football for Framingham State. In 2021, he won the Massachusetts State Collegiate Athletic Conference (MASCAC) defensive player of the year honors.

== Professional career ==
Pre-draft measurables
Height	Weight	Arm length	Hand span	40-yard dash	10-yard split	20-yard split	20-yard shuttle	Three-cone drill	Vertical jump	Broad jump	Bench press
6 ft 2 3/4 in (1.90 m)	252 lb (114 kg)	32 in (0.81 m)	9 5/8 in (0.24 m)	4.90 s	1.68 s	2.78 s	4.14 s	6.93 s	34.5 in (0.88 m)	10 ft 1 in (3.07 m)	21 reps
All values from Pro Day

On May 2, 2022, the Seattle Seahawks signed Onujiogu as an undrafted free agent. On August 31, he was waived. He was re-signed to the practice squad on September 2. On November 5, Onujiogu was elevated to the active roster, and made his NFL debut the following day against the Arizona Cardinals, recording three tackles while appearing on 17 snaps. He was signed to the active roster on January 7, 2023.

On August 9, 2023, Onujiogu was waived/injured by the Seahawks. He was waived/injured again the following year on August 6, 2024.
