= George S. Griggs =

George S. Griggs (1805-1870) was a pioneer master mechanic in the earliest days of railroading in the United States.

Griggs, like other mechanics of his age, learned the art of machining at Locks and Canals Machine Shop. In 1834 the Boston and Providence (B&P) railroad hired Griggs as their master mechanic, where he spent the remainder of his career.

1845 saw Griggs building his first locomotive, a 4-4-0 named Norfolk, at the railroad shops where he worked in Roxbury. Griggs oversaw the construction of nearly twenty more locomotives that used designs and technology from Norfolk.

Diagram from U.S. patent 18,883, Griggs's improved fire arch. In the diagram, A is the firebox door on the locomotive backhead (in the cab).

While employed at the railroad, Griggs filed several patents of his own design for items as varied as brake systems, driving wheels, and the firebrick arch. His designs were so successful that the B&P continued building locomotives to his designs for a few years after his death in 1870.

== See also ==
- Taunton Locomotive Manufacturing Company
