= Taunton Locomotive Manufacturing Company =

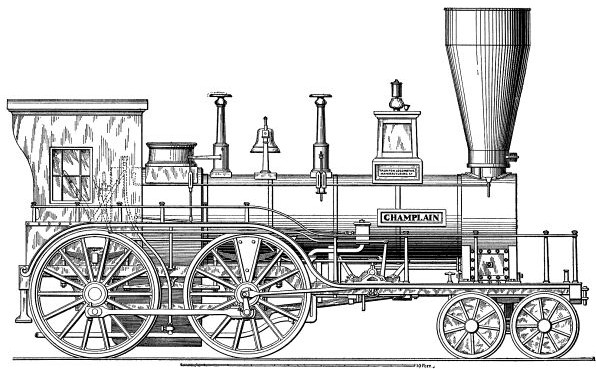
The Champlain, built by Taunton Locomotive Manufacturing Company in 1849 for the Hudson Valley Railroad

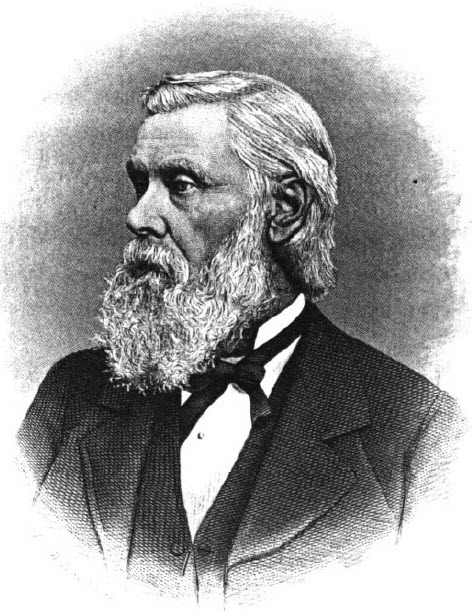
P.I. Perrin

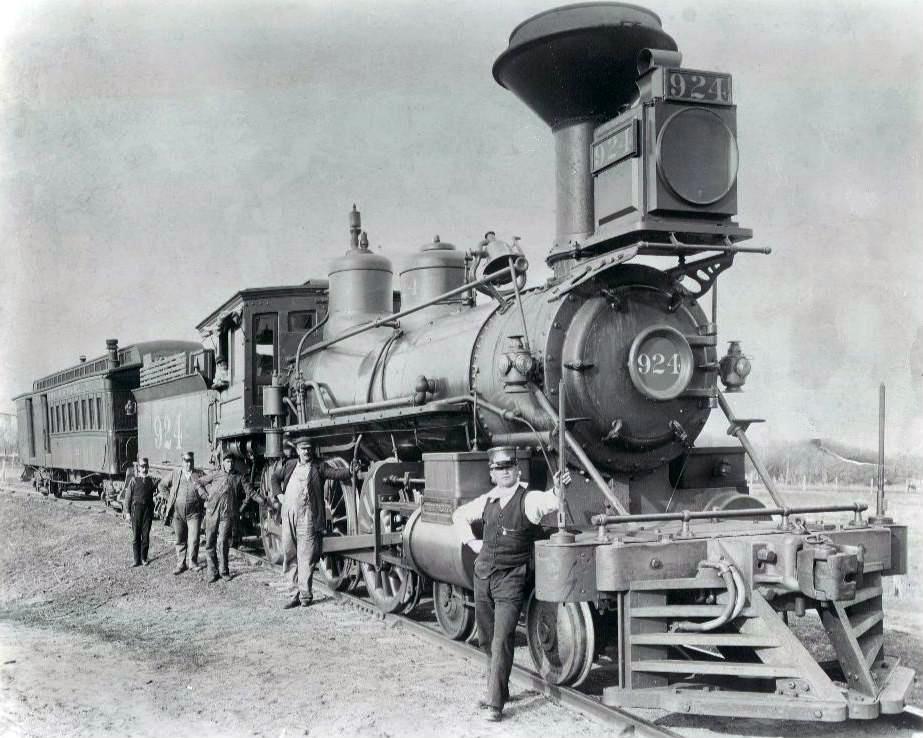
This Union Pacific Railroad locomotive was built by Taunton in July 1868.

The Taunton Locomotive Manufacturing Company was one of the earliest firms in the United States established especially for the manufacture of steam locomotives. Located in Taunton, Massachusetts, the company was organized in 1849 and incorporated the following year by William A. Crocker, Willard W. Fairbanks, William R. Lee and their associates. Their first engine, the Rough and Ready was delivered in May 1849.

== Company history ==
Willard W. Fairbanks was a machinist who had worked in Providence, Rhode Island building stationary and marine engines. The company's first engine was built from castings and plans prepared by George S. Griggs, who had been associated with the Boston & Providence Railroad, one of the earliest railroads in New England, which began operation in 1849.

The company's shops were located on Wales Street just west of downtown Taunton along what was then the Taunton Branch Railroad, and later part of the Old Colony Railroad's vast system in Southeastern Massachusetts.

In 1852 the company faced new competition from their neighbor across the tracks, the Mason Machine Works, a successful Taunton textile machine company, that decided to enter the locomotive-building trade.

By 1860, Taunton Locomotive had produced almost 300 engines. In 1861, Harrison Tweed would take over control the company from Fairbanks, and lead it through perhaps its most productive period. He was succeeded by Parley I. Perrin (P.I. Perrin) in about 1871. Perrin began as a machinist had joined the company in 1846 as a forman and draftsman, and worked his way up through the leadership ranks.

By 1877, Taunton Locomotive had its 675th locomotive. However, by then the company lagged far behind the larger locomotive builders of the time, such as Baldwin and Schenectady. The engines of Taunton, and the other New England locomotive builders were considered obsolete compared to these larger establishments.

In 1883, the locomotive works established the Huber Printing Press Company to supplement its dwindling locomotive business. That same year, Nahum Stetson became president, after the death of Samuel L. Crocker.

The last locomotive produced by Taunton Locomotive was built in 1889. The company also ventured into steam-powered snow plows, and other items, but sales gradually declined during the last decade of the 19th century. The company lasted until 1899. Over 900 steam locomotives had been produced by the Taunton Locomotive Manufacturing Company in its roughly sixty years in existence.

== Legacy ==
In 1906 the site of the locomotive works was purchased by New England Cotton Yarns, a large conglomerate of textile mills, based in Boston.

In 1947 the buildings of the Taunton Locomotive Manufacturing Company were demolished.

The site is now occupied by a shopping center, constructed in the 1970s as part of an urban redevelopment plan by the City of Taunton.
