= Bridgewater Iron Works =

- U.S. National Register of Historic Places
- U.S. Historic district
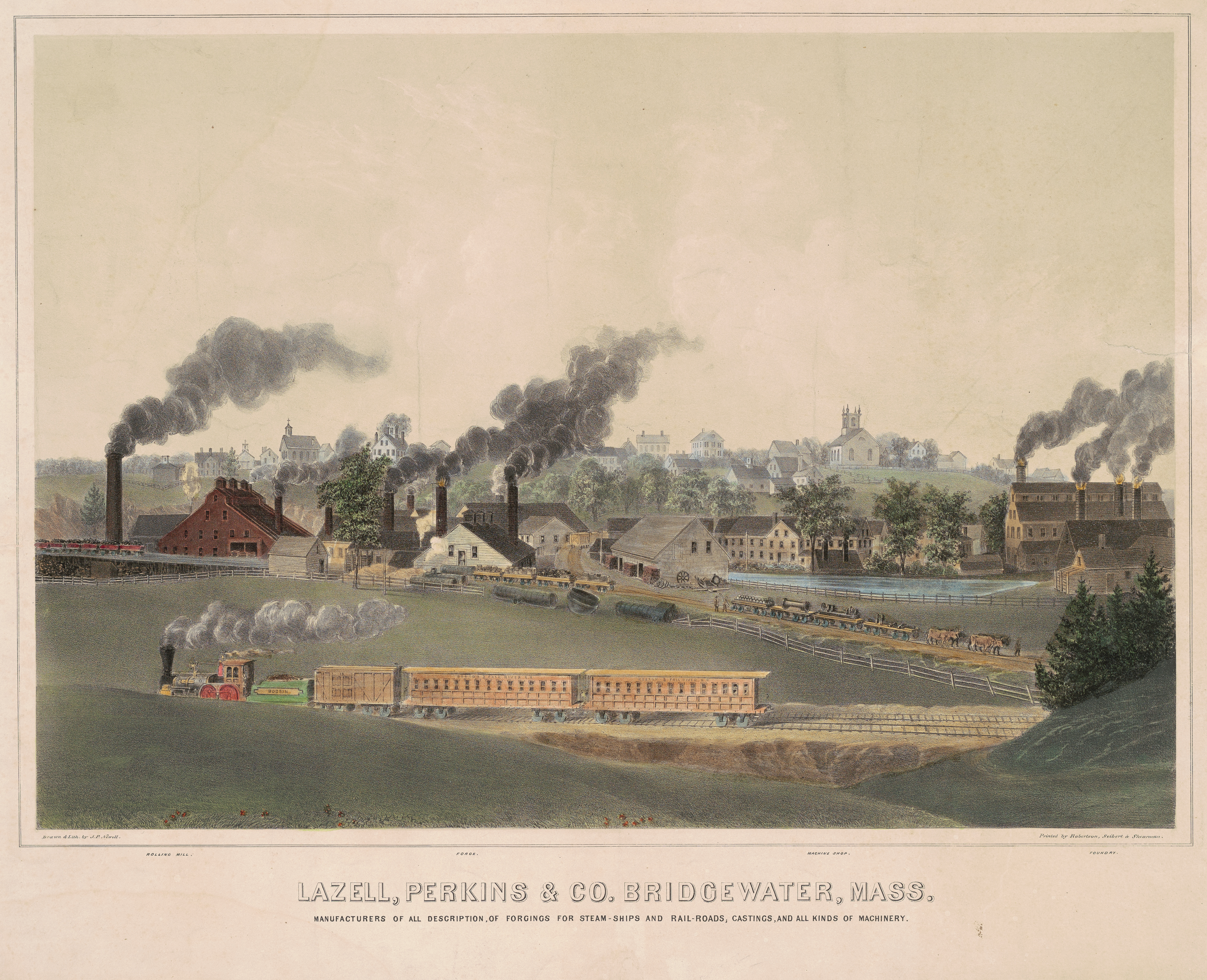
- Lazell, Perkins & Co., Bridgewater, Mass., by John Perry Newell, c. 1860
- Location: Bridgewater, Massachusetts
- Built: 1694
- NRHP reference No.: 01000087
- Added to NRHP: February 28, 2002

The Bridgewater Iron Works is a historic industrial site located on High Street in Bridgewater, Massachusetts, United States, along the banks of the Town River. Previously known as Lazell, Perkins and Company, by the mid-19th century, the Bridgewater Iron Manufacturing Company was one of the largest iron works in the United States, specializing in heavy castings and forgings. The property was later acquired by the Stanley Works, with the surrounding village still known to this day as Stanley.

The location was most recently used for manufacturing by the Bridgewater Foundry Company until 1988. It has since been converted into a small public park, with only the remnants of a stone storehouse remaining. The site was added to the National Register of Historic Places in 2002.

== History ==
The industrial history of the site began in 1694, when David Perkins was granted permission to construct a dam across the Town River by the colonial government of Massachusetts. By 1707, Perkins had established a blacksmith shop at the site.

In 1785, brothers Isaac and Nathan Lazell built a new slitting mill on the site - the second mill in the country to be erected after the end of the Revolutionary War. (The construction of new iron mills had been prohibited by the British Crown since 1750). A second slitting mill was added in 1793. By 1795, the Lazell brothers were manufacturing over 445 tons of iron per year. Jacob Perkins, a skilled mechanic soon joined the company, in which he later became a partner.

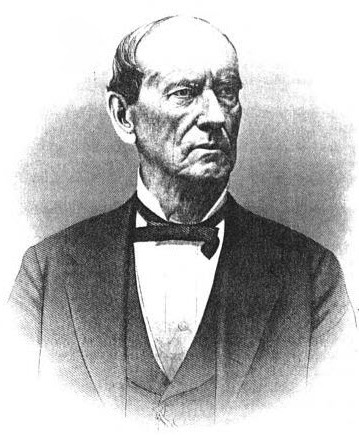
Nahum Stetson

From 1810 to 1816, the company was known as Lazell, Carey & Company and produced cannons during the War of 1812 and iron pots for the whaling industry, among other items, including cut nails and iron hoops for wooden barrels. In 1816, Carey died and the company was renamed Lazell, Perkins & Company. In 1825, the company became incorporated as the Bridgewater Iron Manufacturing Company, but continued doing business as Lazell, Perkins & Company for many years after.

In 1830, the company began manufacturing steam engines and large additions were made to the works. However, this endeavor was discontinued after just a few years, with the firm deciding to concentrate on its iron and foundry businesses, including the machinery used in the production of these goods. In 1835, upon the death of Nathan Lazell, Jr., Nahum Stetson became treasurer. In the years to follow, Stetson, who had been with the firm since 1825, would guide the company through a period of great expansion, surviving the great financial Panics of 1837 and 1857. With his successes in Bridgewater, Stetson would also become associated with several other iron works in the area, including the Weymouth Iron Company in 1841, the Tremont Iron Works in Wareham in 1846, and the Providence Iron Company in 1854. Stetson was also later associated with the Old Colony Iron works in Taunton, as well as numerous other businesses in the region.

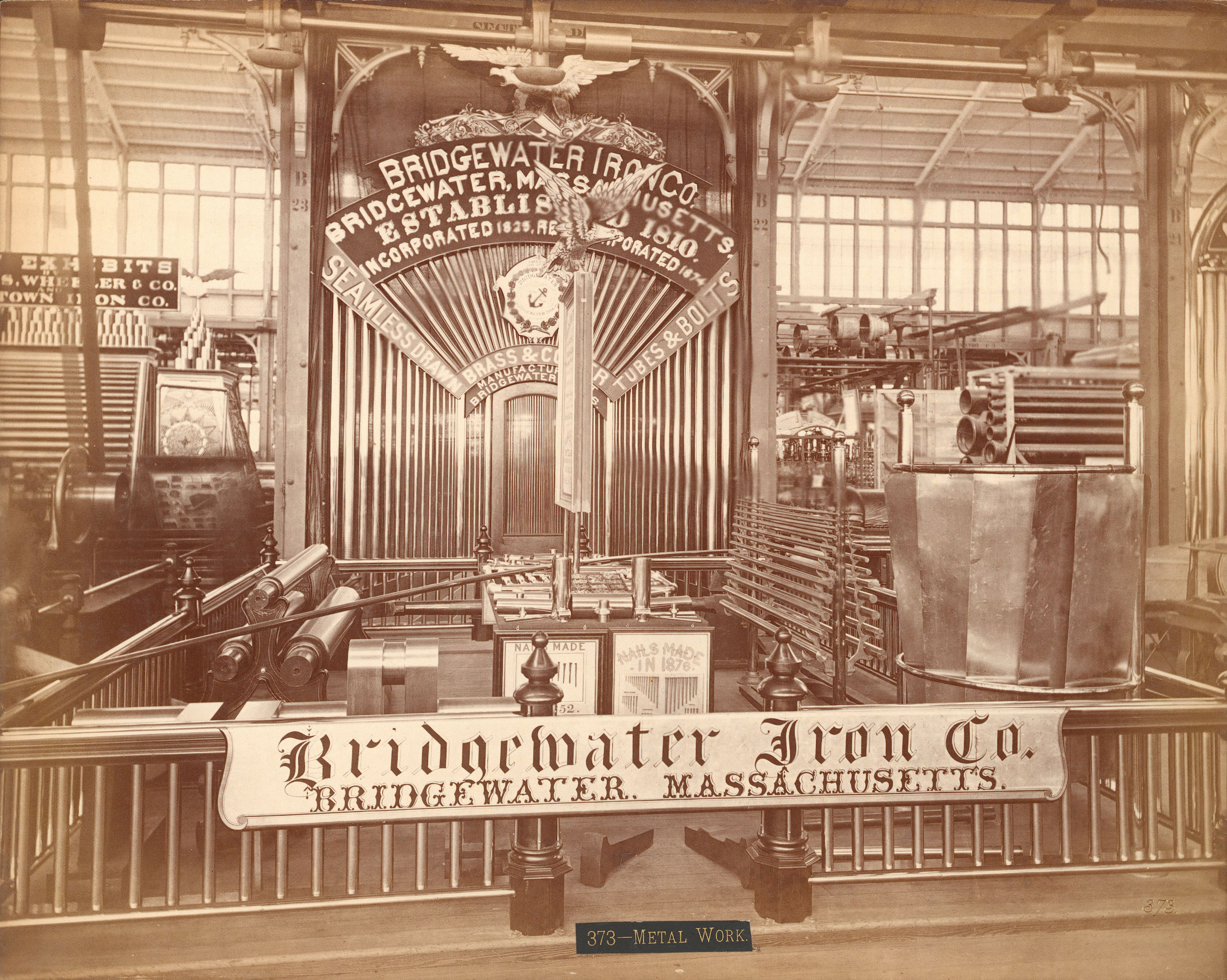
The Bridgewater Iron Company exhibit at the U.S. Centennial Exhibition in Philadelphia, 1876

In 1845, the Fall River Railroad reached Bridgewater, and the following year, a connection to Boston was completed, allowing the company much easier access to these markets. The company grew rapidly during this time, and by the early 1850s, it employed 250 men and contained about 10 acres devoted to manufacturing. James Ferguson became superintendent of the works in 1856, and would be in charge of the daily operation of the company for several decades.

By 1860, at the dawn of the Civil War, the Bridgewater Iron Company was one of the largest in the country, specializing in heavy castings and forgings, including key parts for the United States Navy, including the famous USS Monitor and the USS New Ironsides iron-clad warships, and the Pacific Mail Steamship Company. By 1868, the company employed about 600 men. The company also produced drawn copper and brass tubes for steam boilers.

In 1899, the site was purchased by the Stanley Works of New Britain, Connecticut for the manufacture of machinery and steel plate used in tool production. The section of Bridgewater surrounding the plant soon became known as Stanley. The company operated the site until 1928, when production was shifted to New Britain. The site was then acquired by the George O. Jenkins Company, for storage of scrap paper.

The property was heavily damaged by the Hurricane of 1938. Between 1946 and 1988, two buildings on the site were operated by the Bridgewater Foundry Company, which produced grey iron castings.

== Iron Works Park ==
The property was donated to the Town of Bridgewater in 1994 by the Brousseau and Landner families, the last owners of the foundry. Much of the site has been converted into Iron Works Park. The 12-acre park includes a small bridge over the Town River, and the remnants of several buildings. Another portion of the property now contains the town's highway department.

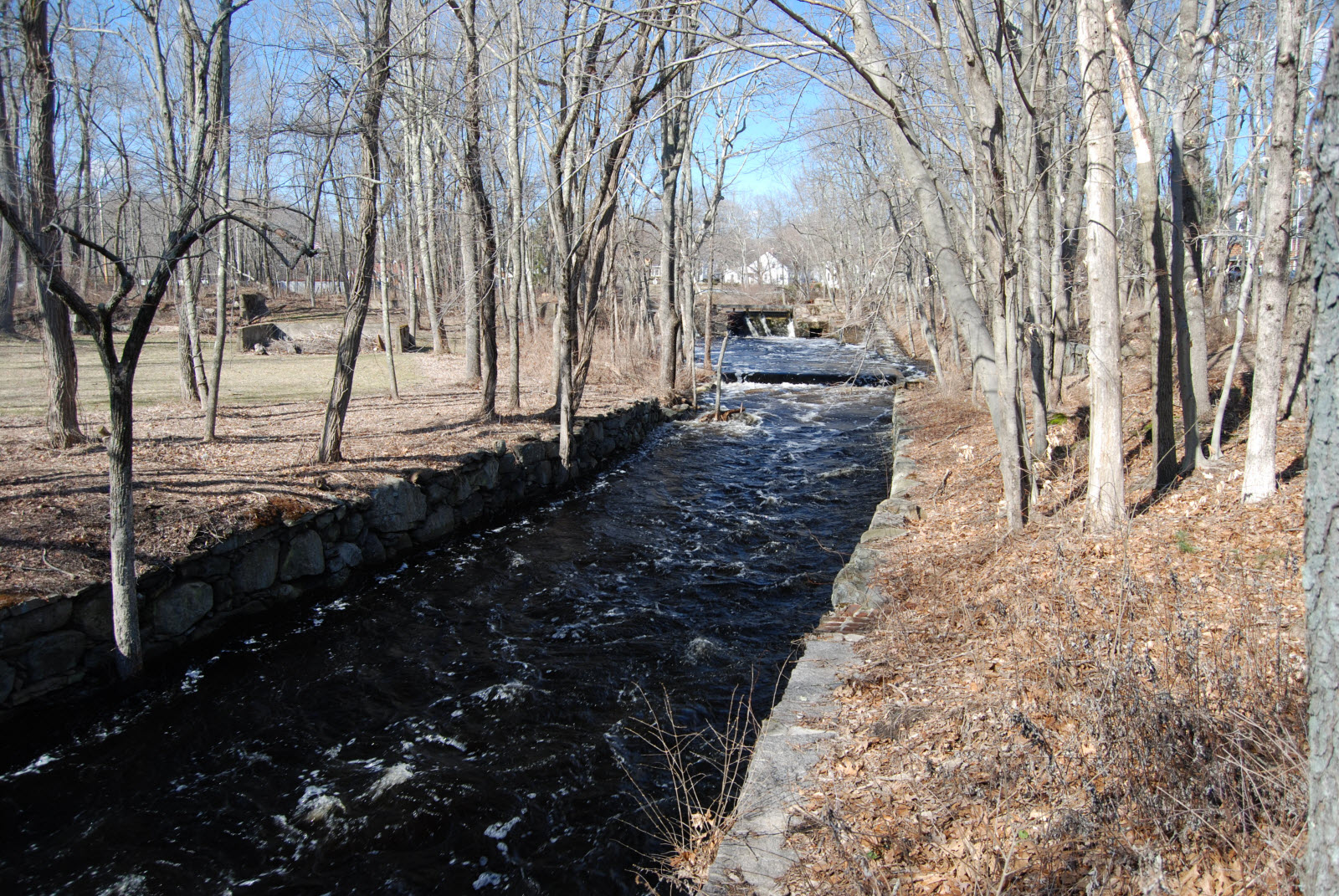
The Town River at Iron Works Park

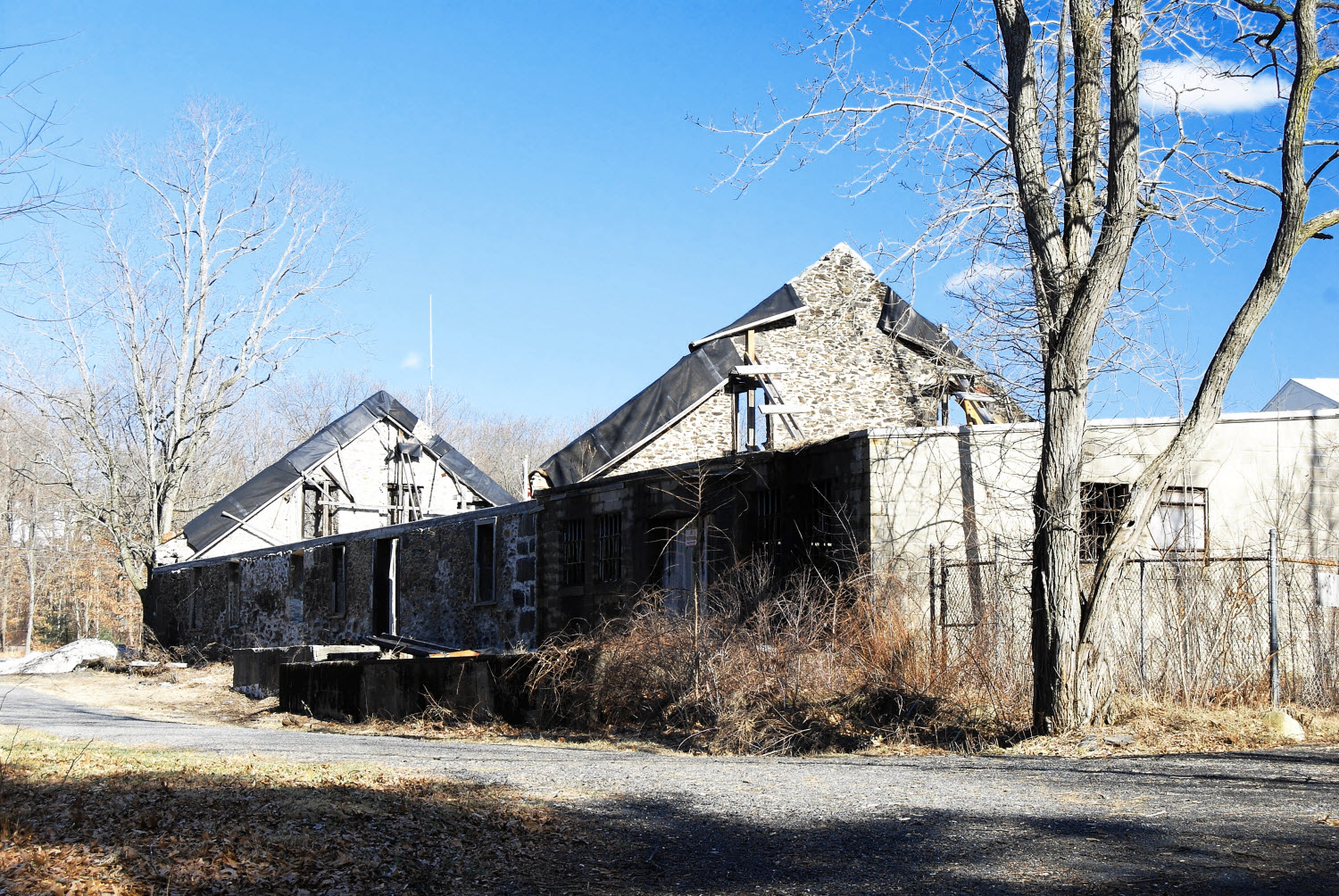
Remains of a storage building

== See also ==
- National Register of Historic Places listings in Plymouth County, Massachusetts
- Old Colony Iron Works
- Tremont Nail Company
