= Old Colony Iron Works-Nemasket Mills Complex =

- U.S. National Register of Historic Places
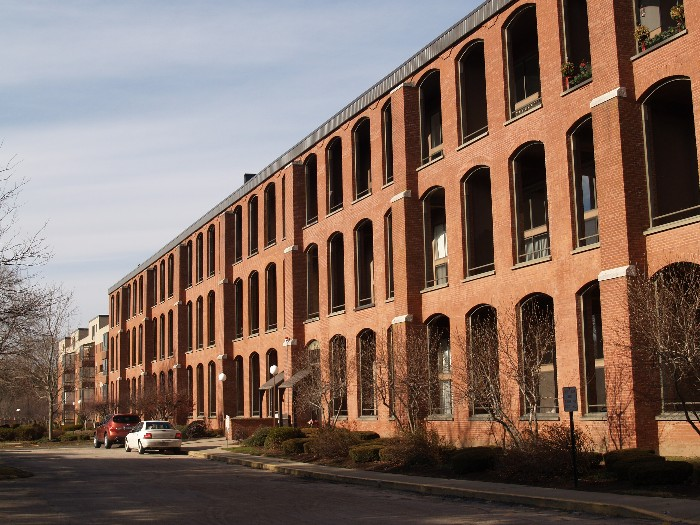
- Former Nemasket Mill

- Location within Massachusetts Location within the United States
- Location: Taunton, Massachusetts
- Coordinates: 41°53′9″N 71°1′38″W
- Built: 1834
- Architectural style: Colonial Revival
- MPS: Taunton MRA
- NRHP reference No.: 84002190
- Added to NRHP: July 5, 1984

The Old Colony Iron Works-Nemasket Mills Complex is a historic industrial site located on Old Colony Avenue in the East Taunton section of Taunton, Massachusetts, United States, adjacent to the Taunton River at the Raynham town line. The site was first occupied by the Old Colony Iron Company, which had originally been established in the 1820s as Horatio Leonard & Company. The western part of the complex was sold to Nemasket Mills in 1889. The eastern part was acquired by the Standard Oil Cloth Company. The site was added to the National Register of Historic Places in 1984.

== Old Colony Iron Works ==
In 1813, Stephen King built a dam across the Taunton River, a short distance above the site of what would become the Old Colony Iron Company. His rights were later acquired by Horatio Leonard & Company in 1823, when a new dam was built ten rods downstream. The new firm operated an iron works here, producing nails, tacks and rolled iron until 1842. The Taunton Tow Path Company operated barges from 1836 to 1854 along canals that were built on both sides of the river to bypass the dam. In 1843, a group of investors that included prominent Taunton businessman Samuel L. Crocker, George A. Crocker, and brothers Charles and Enoch Robinson bought the idle iron works property. The Robinson brothers, originally of Bridgewater, had been working for Horatio Leonard since about 1827.

In 1844, the new company was incorporated as the Old Colony Iron Company. The facilities were quickly expanded. By 1871, the manufacturing facilities consisted of a rolling mill and a nail mill on the west side of Old Colony Avenue and a shovel mill on the east side of Old Colony Avenue.

By the mid-1870s, the Old Colony Iron Company manufactured more nails than any other company in New England - as much as 130,000 kegs per year. By 1876, the equipment of the company included: 5 double and 6 single puddling furnaces, 9 heating furnaces, 96 nail machines, 5 trains of rolls and 5 hammers, operating on both water and steam power.

The company was hit with a substantial loss in August, 1881, when fire destroyed the nail factory and steam tack plate mill. However, the shovel mill survived destruction. Rather than rebuilding the nail mill, the company purchased the Somerset Iron Company's works in nearby Somerset, Massachusetts. The tack plate mill was rebuilt at East Taunton.

After the 1881 fire, the company concentrated more production in the manufacture of rolled steel plate for shovels. However, during this period many iron works throughout New England found it increasingly harder to compete with the iron and steel mills of Pennsylvania, the Midwest and the Southern United States, who with their easier access to coal and iron ore could produce far cheaper goods. By the end of the 1880s, many had gone out of business. Oliver Washburn, Jr. served as the last treasurer of the Old Colony Iron Company, when the property was sold in 1889.

The shovel mill located eastern portion of the iron works site was later occupied by the Standard Oil Cloth Company. In 1893, the Chandler Oil Cloth & Buckram Company was formed, with Frank W. Whitcher as president, a working capital of $200,000. The company manufactured buckram, a heavy cotton cloth used for book covers, and oilcloth, a heavy waterproof cotton fabric.

== Nemasket Mills ==
The Nemasket Mills Corporation was established in 1891 for cotton textile manufacture on the western portion of the former site of the Old Colony Iron Works. With an initial working capital of $400,000, Lewis Williams served as the company's first president. In 1899, this mill was acquired by New England Cotton Yarn Company, which also included the Cohannet Mills in Taunton, and several other mills in Fall River and New Bedford. The company's Taunton mills were sold in June, 1916. Cohannet Mill No. 3, located at Weir Village was sold by New England Cotton Yarn Company to William Butler, who renamed it Nemasket Mill. The former Nemasket Mill (Old Colony Avenue) was sold to the Connecticut Cotton Mills Company. Operating as the Taunton Cotton Mills Company, the plant produced cotton cord for the tire industry.

== Recent history ==
The former Nemasket Mills was converted into residential condominiums in the 1980s, with a large addition constructed at the rear of the site, and is known as River Bend Condominiums ( 96 Old Colony Avenue ). An interesting feature of the mill conversion was the removal of the original large mill window panes and the construction of a new wall behind the original openings, creating balcony areas for the residents.

The portion of the complex on the east side of Old Colony Avenue, formerly occupied by the shovel works, now contains various small commercial buildings.

== See also ==
- Bridgewater Iron Works
- Fall River Iron Works
- National Register of Historic Places listings in Taunton, Massachusetts
- Taunton Iron Works
- Tremont Nail Company
- Nahum Stetson
