= Weweantic River =

River in Massachusetts, United States

Coordinates: 41.72171°N 70.7249°W

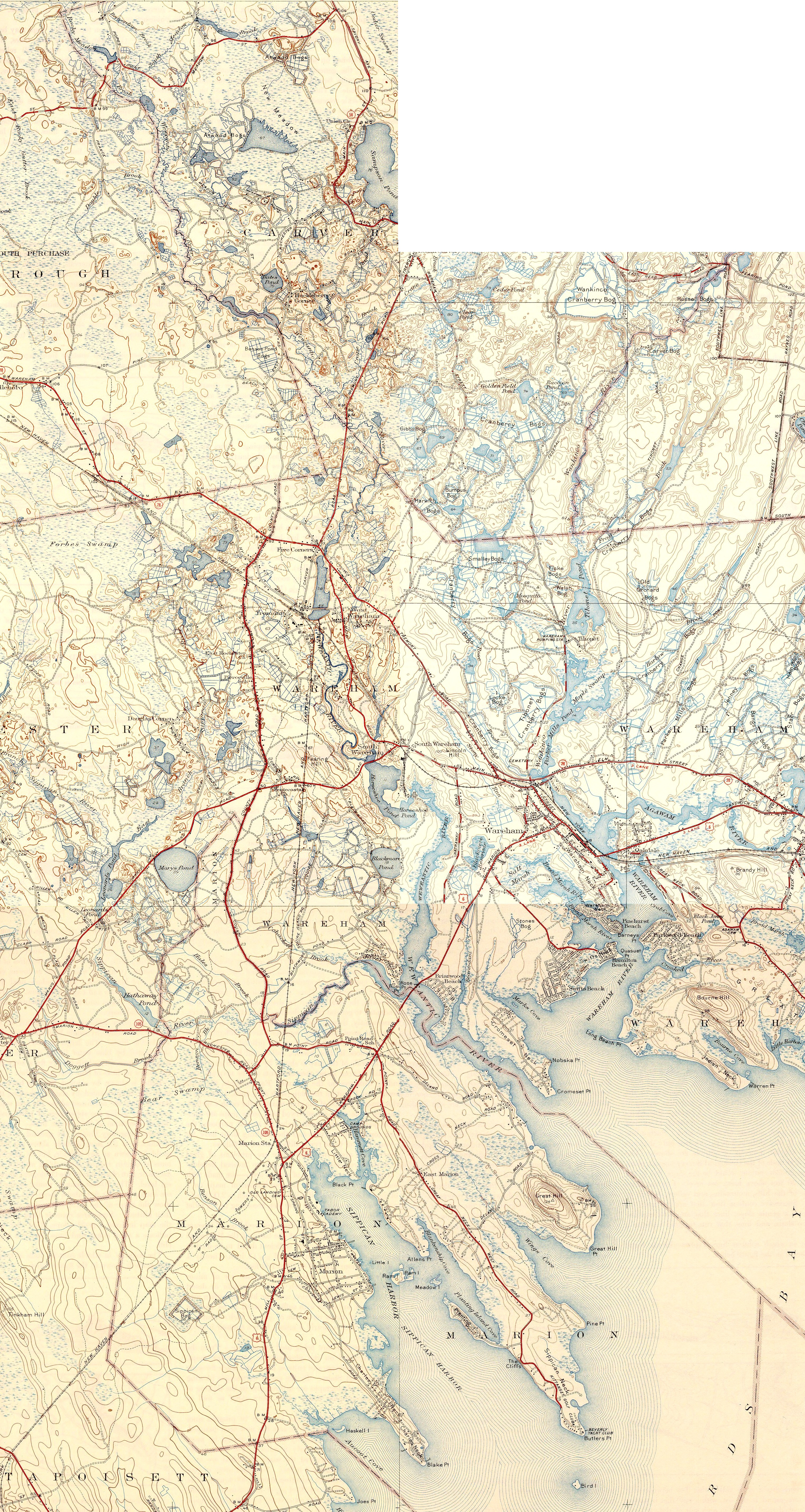
The Weweantic River and environs

The Weweantic River is a 17.0-mile-long (27.4 km) river in southeastern Massachusetts. Its name means "crooked" or "wandering stream" in the Wampanoag language.

The river arises in wetlands in Carver, meanders generally south through swampy birch and maple forests in Middleborough and Rochester, and drains into a Buzzards Bay estuary in Wareham near the mouth of the Sippican River. Its watershed covers approximately 18,000 acres (73 km^{2}), with many cranberry bogs in its upper reaches.

Although the river has historically abounded in fish and shellfish, it currently has no significant herring population due to dam obstruction below Horseshoe Pond, and is closed to shellfish harvesting due to bacterial contamination.
