= Wareham, Massachusetts =

- Town
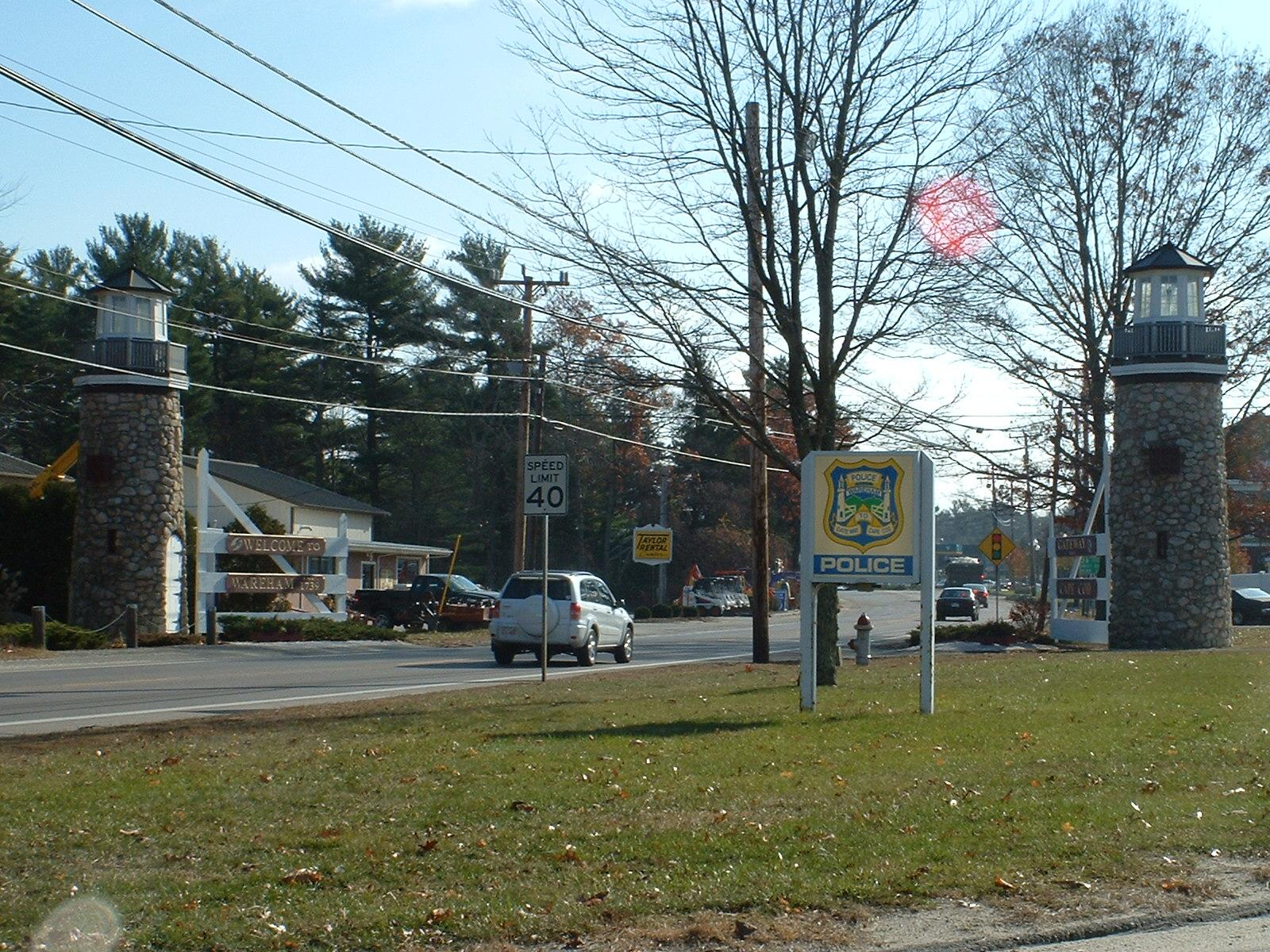
- "The Gateway to the Cape"

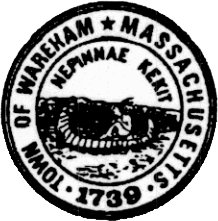
- Seal

- Location in Plymouth County in Massachusetts
- Coordinates: 41°45′45″N 70°43′20″W
- Country: United States
- State: Massachusetts
- County: Plymouth
- Settled: 1678
- Incorporated: 1739

Government
  - Type: Open town meeting

Area
  - Total: 46.3 sq mi (119.9 km^{2})
  - Land: 35.8 sq mi (92.7 km^{2})
  - Water: 10.5 sq mi (27.1 km^{2})
- Elevation: 20 ft (6 m)

Population (2020)
  - Total: 23,303
  - Density: 651/sq mi (251/km^{2})
- Time zone: UTC−5 (Eastern)
  - Summer (DST): UTC−4 (Eastern)
- ZIP Codes: 02571 (Wareham); 02532 (Buzzards Bay); 02538 (East Wareham); 02558 (Onset); 02576 (West Wareham)
- Area code: 508/774
- FIPS code: 25-72985
- GNIS feature ID: 0618353
- Website: www.wareham.gov

Wareham (/ˈwɛərhæm/ WAIR-ham) is a town in Plymouth County, Massachusetts, United States. As of the 2020 census, the town had a population of 23,303.

Wareham is in the southern outskirts of Greater Boston, and is a part of the South Coast region of Massachusetts which encompasses the cities and towns that surround Buzzards and Mount Hope bays.

== History ==
Wareham was first settled in 1678 by Europeans as part of the towns of Plymouth and Rochester. It was officially incorporated in 1739 and named after the town of Wareham in England. Because of its geography, Wareham's early industry revolved around shipbuilding and the related industries. It also served as a resort town, with many smaller resorts scattered around the town, especially in Onset. Like Sandwich, its waterways, especially Buttermilk Bay, were considered as possible pathways for the Cape Cod Canal. Although the canal proper goes through Bourne and Sandwich, the southern approach to Buzzards Bay passes just south of the peninsulas that make up the topography of the town.

Wareham is home of the Tremont Nail Factory, the oldest nail manufacturer in the United States. The factory was established in 1819.

For years the town was known by its slogan "Gateway to Cape Cod," but in January 2020 adopted a new slogan: "It's Better Before the Bridges." The intent was to draw attention to the appeal of Wareham as a tourist destination itself, rather than as a conduit to somewhere else.

== Geography ==
According to the United States Census Bureau, the town has a total area of 46.3 square miles (120 km^{2}), of which 35.8 square miles (93 km^{2}) is land and 10.5 square miles (27 km^{2}) is water. The total area is 22.64% water. Wareham is bordered by Marion to the southwest, Buzzards Bay to the southeast, Rochester to the west, Middleborough to the northwest, Carver and Plymouth to the north, and Bourne to the east. The town's localities are numerous, the most important being East Wareham, Onset, Point Independence, Wareham Center, and West Wareham. The town is just west of Cape Cod, and is 18 miles (29 km) east of New Bedford, approximately 45 miles (72 km) east of Providence, Rhode Island and 55 miles (89 km) south-southeast of Boston.

In recent years, the town has sought to use its location as part of Cape Cod as a marketing ploy.

Wareham is the innermost town on the north shore of Buzzards Bay. The Weweantic River empties in the southwestern corner of town, with the Sippican River and other brooks emptying into it. The Wareham River, which is formed at the confluence of the Wankinco and Agawam rivers, flows into the harbor east of the Weweantic, and has brooks and the Mill Pond River as tributaries. To the east lie Onset Bay and Buttermilk Bay, both of which empty into the head of the bay, at the right-of-way of the Cape Cod Canal. Between these rivers and bays lie several points and necks, including Cromesett Point, Swift's Neck, Long Beach Point, Indian Neck, Stony Point, Cedar Island Point, Codman's Point, Sias Point and Whittemore's Point. The southern boundary of Myles Standish State Forest is concurrent with the town line between Wareham and Plymouth.

The town of Wareham encompasses a number of neighborhoods and named places, including Onset, Wareham Center, West Wareham, East Wareham, Weweantic, and White Island Shores.

There are a number of ponds and lakes in Wareham, including Blackmore Pond, Horseshoe Pond, and Mill Pond.

=== Climate ===
Climate data for East Wareham, Massachusetts (1991–2020 normals, extremes 1912–present)
Month	Jan	Feb	Mar	Apr	May	Jun	Jul	Aug	Sep	Oct	Nov	Dec	Year
Record high °F (°C)	67 (19)	66 (19)	75 (24)	89 (32)	97 (36)	99 (37)	99 (37)	100 (38)	96 (36)	89 (32)	82 (28)	70 (21)	100 (38)
Mean maximum °F (°C)	55 (13)	54 (12)	63 (17)	71 (22)	81 (27)	87 (31)	92 (33)	89 (32)	83 (28)	76 (24)	67 (19)	60 (16)	93 (34)
Mean daily maximum °F (°C)	38.1 (3.4)	39.4 (4.1)	45.8 (7.7)	55.1 (12.8)	65.3 (18.5)	74.2 (23.4)	80.6 (27.0)	79.5 (26.4)	72.6 (22.6)	62.3 (16.8)	52.8 (11.6)	43.9 (6.6)	59.1 (15.1)
Daily mean °F (°C)	30.0 (−1.1)	30.9 (−0.6)	37.4 (3.0)	46.6 (8.1)	56.6 (13.7)	66.0 (18.9)	72.5 (22.5)	71.2 (21.8)	63.8 (17.7)	53.5 (11.9)	44.2 (6.8)	35.9 (2.2)	50.7 (10.4)
Mean daily minimum °F (°C)	21.9 (−5.6)	22.5 (−5.3)	28.9 (−1.7)	37.5 (3.1)	47.9 (8.8)	57.7 (14.3)	64.4 (18.0)	62.8 (17.1)	55.1 (12.8)	44.6 (7.0)	35.4 (1.9)	27.7 (−2.4)	42.2 (5.7)
Mean minimum °F (°C)	4 (−16)	6 (−14)	14 (−10)	27 (−3)	36 (2)	45 (7)	54 (12)	52 (11)	41 (5)	30 (−1)	21 (−6)	12 (−11)	2 (−17)
Record low °F (°C)	−15 (−26)	−22 (−30)	−5 (−21)	13 (−11)	26 (−3)	36 (2)	41 (5)	38 (3)	29 (−2)	18 (−8)	5 (−15)	−15 (−26)	−22 (−30)
Average precipitation inches (mm)	4.06 (103)	3.68 (93)	5.51 (140)	4.49 (114)	3.80 (97)	3.70 (94)	3.09 (78)	3.59 (91)	4.67 (119)	5.00 (127)	4.44 (113)	5.07 (129)	51.1 (1,298)
Average snowfall inches (cm)	12.5 (32)	10.1 (26)	7.5 (19)	1.3 (3.3)	0.0 (0.0)	0.0 (0.0)	0.0 (0.0)	0.0 (0.0)	0.0 (0.0)	0.0 (0.0)	0.2 (0.51)	6.2 (16)	37.8 (96.81)
Average extreme snow depth inches (cm)	4 (10)	7 (18)	7 (18)	4 (10)	1 (2.5)	0 (0)	0 (0)	0 (0)	0 (0)	0 (0)	0 (0)	4 (10)	11 (28)
Average precipitation days (≥ 0.01 in)	12	10	12	12	12	10	9	9	9	11	10	13	129
Average snowy days (≥ 0.1 in)	5	4	3	0	0	0	0	0	0	0	0	2	14
Source: National Weather Service

== Demographics ==
Historical population
Year	Pop.	±%
1790	854	—
1870	3,186	+273.1%
1880	3,186	+0.0%
1890	3,098	−2.8%
1900	2,896	−6.5%
1910	3,451	+19.2%
1920	3,432	−0.6%
1930	4,102	+19.5%
1940	6,364	+55.1%
1950	7,569	+18.9%
1960	9,461	+25.0%
1970	11,492	+21.5%
1980	18,457	+60.6%
1990	19,232	+4.2%
2000	20,335	+5.7%
2010	21,822	+7.3%
2020	23,303	+6.8%
2024*	23,526	+1.0%
* = population estimate. Source: United States census records and Population Estimates Program data.

As of the census of 2000, there were 20,335 people, 8,200 households, and 5,338 families residing in the town. The population density was 568.1 inhabitants per square mile (219.3/km^{2}). There were 10,670 housing units at an average density of 298.1 per square mile (115.1/km^{2}). The racial makeup of the town as of July 2019 was 85.7% White, 2.7% African American, Asian 0.6%, 5.1% from two or more races, 3.6% Hispanic or Latino and 0.6% American Indian.

There were 8,200 households, out of which 29.5% had children under the age of 18 living with them, 46.4% were married couples living together, 14.2% had a female householder with no husband present, and 34.9% were non-families. 29.2% of all households were made up of individuals, and 12.6% had someone living alone who was 65 years of age or older. The average household size was 2.44 and the average family size was 3.02.

In the town, the population was spread out, with 24.5% under the age of 18, 6.3% from 18 to 24, 28.5% from 25 to 44, 24.5% from 45 to 64, and 16.2% who were 65 years of age or older. The median age was 39 years. For every 100 females, there were 91.5 males. For every 100 females age 18 and over, there were 86.9 males.

The median income for a household in the town was $40,422, and the median income for a family was $45,750. Males had a median income of $37,601 versus $28,306 for females. The per capita income for the town was $21,312. 10.7% of the population and 8.1% of families were below the poverty line. Of those 16.6% under the age of 18 and 13.5% of those 65 and older were living below the poverty line.

== Economy ==
Today, Wareham is mostly residential, although it still has a strong summer tourism industry. It has retail centers along Routes 6 and 28, including Wareham Crossing, opened in 2007.

Historically, the cranberry industry has dominated Wareham's economy, as evidenced by the fact that the main local road is known as Cranberry Highway (Route 28) and one of the world's largest cranberry growers, the A.D. Makepeace Company (a founder of the Ocean Spray growers' cooperative), is headquartered in Wareham. The University of Massachusetts Cranberry Research Station is also located in Wareham, as is the U.S. Department of Agriculture's Cranberry Marketing Committee.

== Government ==
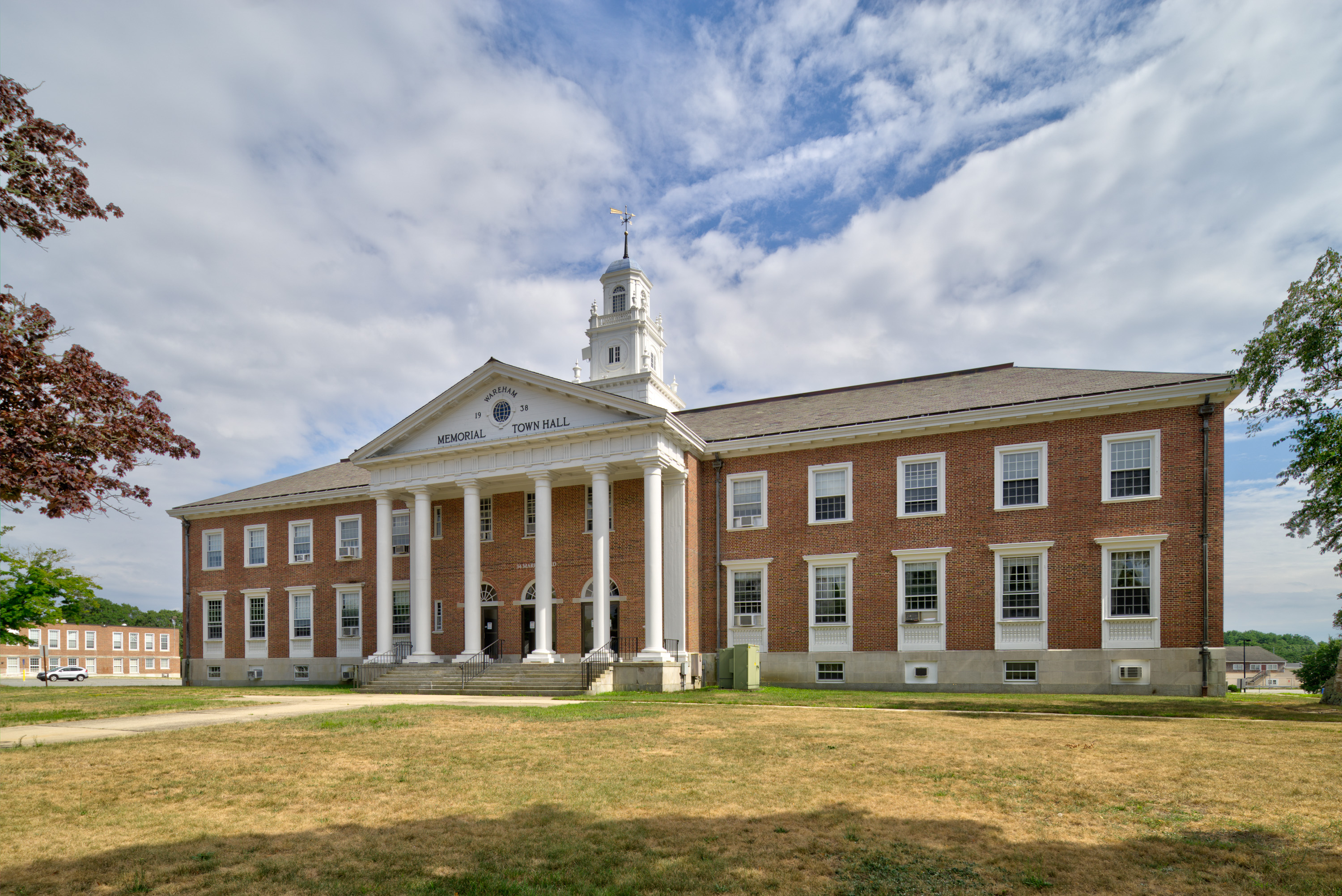
Wareham Memorial Town Hall

Wareham is represented in the Massachusetts House of Representatives as a part of the Second Plymouth district, which also includes Carver and part of Middleboro. The town is represented in the Massachusetts Senate as a part of the First Plymouth and Bristol district, which also includes Berkley, Bridgewater, Carver, Dighton, Marion, Middleborough, Raynham and Taunton. The town is patrolled by the Seventh (Bourne) Barracks of Troop D of the Massachusetts State Police.

On the national level, Wareham is part of Massachusetts's 9th congressional district and is currently represented by William R. Keating. Its senators are currently Elizabeth Warren and Ed Markey.

Wareham is governed by the open town meeting form of government, which is led by a town administrator and a board of selectmen.

There is a central police station located along Route 28. The Wareham Fire District (career/on-call) has stations located in Wareham Center (Station No. 1, Staffed 24/7 Career/on-call), East Wareham (Station No. 4, Unmanned On-call), West Wareham (Station No. 2, Unmanned On-call) and in White Island, near Glen Charlie Pond (Station No. 3, Unmanned On-call) in the northeast corner of town. The Onset Fire District (Staffed 24/7 Career/on-call) has a fire station located off Route 28/Cranberry Highway near the intersection of Main Avenue. Wareham EMS has a station located on Sandwich Road (Route 6) which is staffed 24/7.

There are four post offices for the town's four ZIP Codes, located in East Wareham (02538), West Wareham (02576), Wareham Center (02571) and a branch office in Onset (02558). The southeastern portion of Wareham is also covered by 02532 of Buzzards Bay. The town's public library, located across the street from the town hall, is part of the SAILS Library Network.

== Education ==
=== Public schools ===
Wareham has a public school system. There is one elementary school, Wareham Elementary School; Wareham Middle School; and Wareham High School. The East Wareham Partnership houses the former West Wareham Academy and the Cooperative Junior-Senior High School.

Wareham High competes in the South Coast Conference for athletics. Its nickname is the Vikings, and its colors are Blue, White, and Gold. Wareham competes with Bourne High School in an annual Thanksgiving Day football game.

High school students may also choose to attend Upper Cape Cod Regional Technical School in Bourne.

=== Private schools ===
There are no private schools in the town, with the nearest being Tabor Academy in Marion. The nearest Catholic high school is Bishop Stang High School in Dartmouth.

== Infrastructure ==
=== Major highways ===
The town has always been a vital transportation point, as the Bay Colony Railroad crosses through the town on its way to Cape Cod. There is a rail station in the town center just behind Main Street. Next to the pond. Interstates 495 and 195 both terminate in the western part of town, with I-495's highway route continuing on as Massachusetts Route 25, which passes through town and around Buttermilk Bay before ending at the Bourne Bridge. Additionally, U.S. Route 6 and Massachusetts Route 28 meet in East Wareham and continue on towards Cape Cod. Route 58's southern terminus is at Route 28 in Rochester, near the Wareham town line.

=== Rail ===
The seasonal CapeFLYER service began stopping at Wareham Village station in June 2014. Based on the success of the CapeFLYER, commuter service to Wareham and Buzzards Bay is under consideration.

The nearest inter-city (Amtrak) passenger rail stations are Route 128, Providence, and Boston's South Station. The nearest MBTA Commuter Rail station is Middleborough station.

Freight rail service is provided by the Massachusetts Coastal Railroad.

=== Bus ===
Bonanza Bus Lines stops at the Mill Pond Diner daily. A local bus service, the OWL (Onset Wareham Link), operated by the Greater Attleboro Taunton Regional Transit Authority (GATRA), provides bus service around Wareham. The buses also have run to a Tedeschi store in Bourne for connection to Bonanza Buses and to the MBTA's Middleborough/Lakeville Station. Service to these locations is often changed.

=== Air ===
The nearest national and international flights can be reached at Logan International Airport in Boston or T. F. Green Airport in Rhode Island. Barnstable Municipal Airport is also a short trip away, although it only allows for national service.

=== Health Care ===
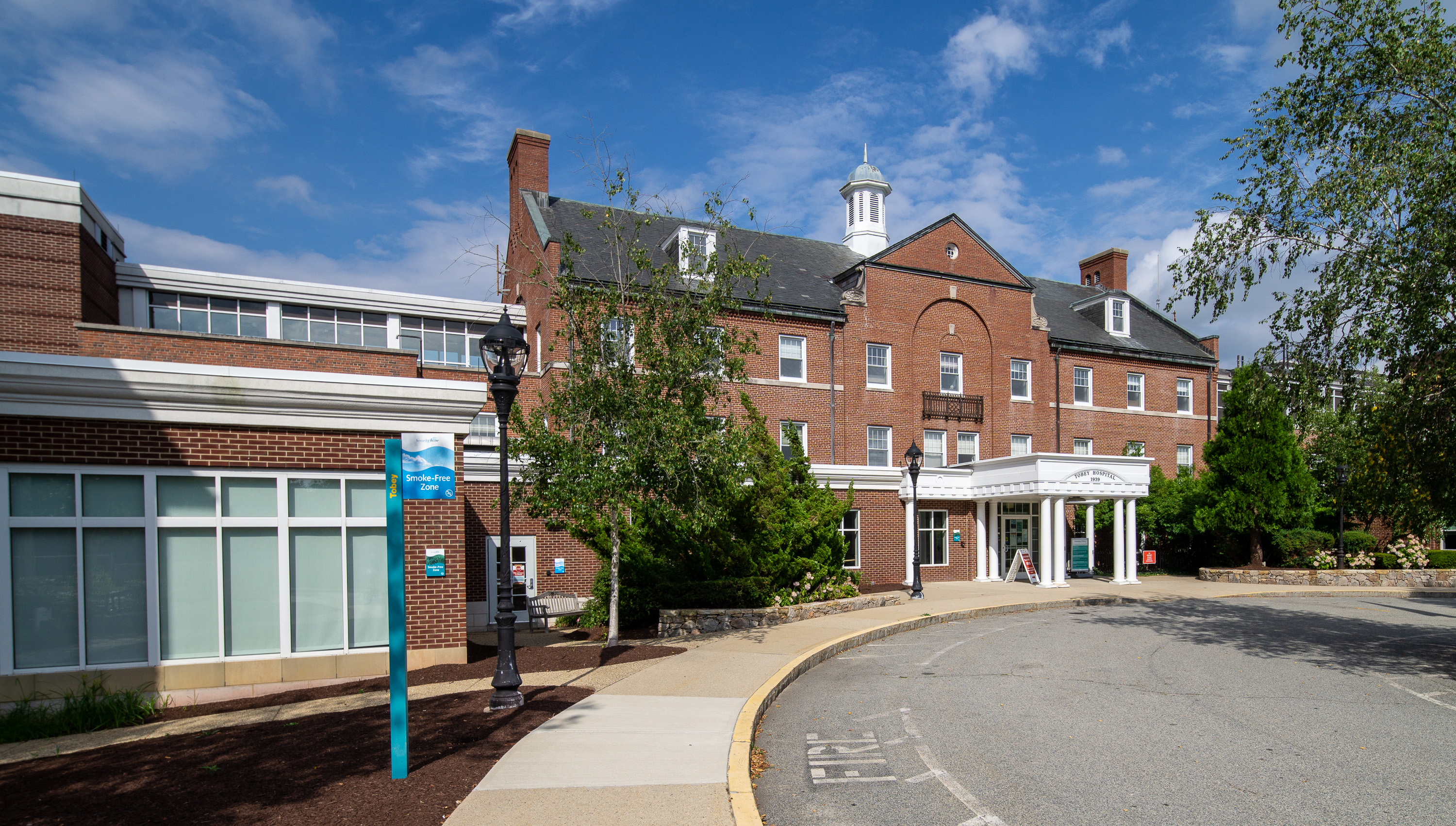
Tobey Hospital

Tobey Hospital was funded by a bequest from the estate of Alice Tobey Jones. The hospital was opened in 1940 and includes a surgical wing and intensive care unit. In 2019, the town approved an expansion of the hospital, which resulted in the demolition of the historic Tobey Homestead.

== Sports ==
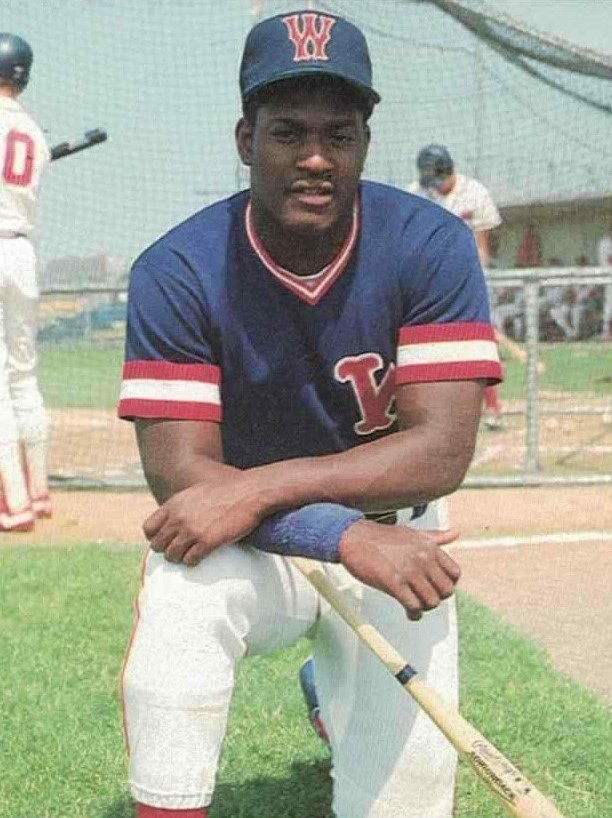
Boston Red Sox All-Star Mo Vaughn played for the Wareham Gatemen in 1987 and 1988.

Wareham is home to the Wareham Gatemen, an amateur collegiate summer baseball team in the Cape Cod Baseball League. The team plays its home games at Clem Spillane Field, and has featured dozens of players who went on to careers in Major League Baseball, such as Mo Vaughn, Lance Berkman, Kyle Schwarber, and Paul Skenes.

Wareham has many town youth sports as well, including Wareham Little League, Wareham JBA, Wareham CBA, Gateway Babe Ruth, Pop Warner Wareham Tigers, Wareham Girls Softball (WGSA), and more.

== Points of interest ==
- Tremont Nail Factory District, a historic nail factory located at 21 Elm Street, which operated from 1819 to 2006 by the Tremont Nail Company
- Water Wizz, water park in the area. It was a spot of filming for the 2010 film Grown Ups and the 2013 film The Way, Way Back.
- The Glen Cove Hotel in Onset, MA. A historic Victorian building built in the 1800s. It's also the highest point in Onset.
- Onset beach adjoins the concrete pier. It is a well protected beach in a broad cove.

== Notable people ==
- Outram Bangs (1863–1932), zoologist
- Benjamin Briggs (1835–c. 1872), Captain of the merchant ship Mary Celeste
- Joe Campini (1920–2001), Negro league baseball player with the Baltimore Elite Giants
- Stephen Cooper (born 1979), NFL Football player for the San Diego Chargers
- Geena Davis (born 1956), Academy Award and Golden Globe-winning actress
- Paul Fearing (1762–1822), a delegate to the U.S. House of Representatives from the Territory Northwest of the River Ohio
- Greg F. Gifune (born 1963), Novelist, Editor
- John Kendrick (1740–1794), sea captain and explorer of the Pacific Northwest
- Eugene T. Maleska (1916–1993), New York Times crossword puzzle editor, had a home in town
- Donald W. Nicholson (1888–1968), congressman
- Joshua Onujiogu (born 1998), NFL linebacker
- Pebbles (Susan L. Samedo, born 1964), Boston radio personality
- Skipp Sudduth (born 1956), actor
- Samuel T. Wellman (1847–1919), steel industry pioneer, industrialist, and prolific inventor
- Brandon Westgate (born 1989), professional skateboarder
- Jeff Bergstrom (born 1977), BrooklynVegan music & comedy columnist, world traveler, museum audio visual innovator
