= Sagamore =

Sagamore may refer to:

- Sachem or "Sagamore", denoting the head of some Native American tribes
- Wampatuck (died 1669), Native American leader known as "Josiah Sagamore" to English settlers

== Places in the United States ==
- Sagamore, Massachusetts, a village located in the town of Bourne
- Sagamore, Pennsylvania (disambiguation)
- Sagamore Bridge, crossing the Cape Cod Canal in Massachusetts, US
- Sagamore Camp, one of the "Great Camps" in the Adirondack Mountains in upstate New York
- Sagamore Hill, the home of President Theodore Roosevelt in Oyster Bay, New York
- Sagamore Hill Military Reservation, a former military reservation protecting the Cape Cod Canal
- The Sagamore, grand Victorian hotel on Lake George, New York

== Ships ==
- Sagamore (barge), an 1892 whaleback barge
- Sagamore (ship), a list of ships
- USS Sagamore, a list of U.S. Navy ships

== Other uses ==
- Sagamore Honor Society, an honor society at Washburn University
- The Sagamore (Brookline High School), student-run newspaper since renamed to The Cypress
- Sagamore Stévenin (born 1974), French actor
- Sagamore of the Wabash, an honorary award conferred by the governor of Indiana
