= Sagamore Beach, Massachusetts =

- Village
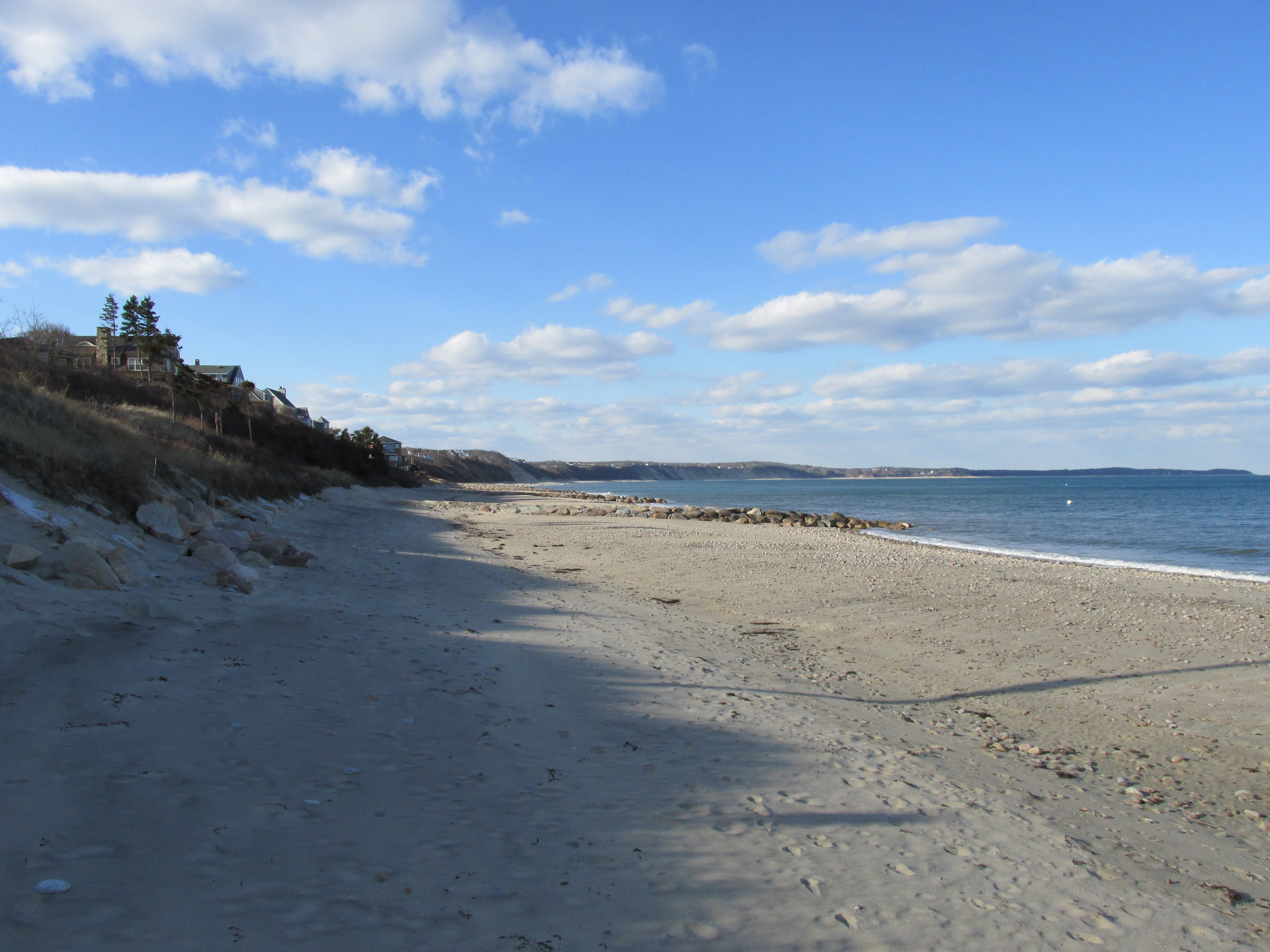
- Sagamore Beach

- Location within Cape Cod
- Coordinates: 41.79°N 70.53°W
- Country: United States
- State: Massachusetts
- County: Barnstable
- Town: Bourne
- Permanent settlers: 1637
- Post Office Opened: 1906

Area
  - Land: 3.36 sq mi (8.7 km^{2})
- Elevation: 62 ft (19 m)

Population (2021)
  - Total: 4,229
  - Density: 1,260/sq mi (490/km^{2})
- Time zone: UTC-5 (Eastern (EST))
  - Summer (DST): UTC-4 (EDT)
- ZIP codes: 02561, 02562
- Area codes: 508, 774
- FIPS code: 25-59000
- GNIS feature ID: 616333
- Website: Barnstable County Website

Sagamore Beach is a village on Cape Cod, in the town of Bourne, Massachusetts, United States. The northern half of the Sagamore census-designated place, Sagamore Beach faces Cape Cod Bay, and the Cape Cod Canal courses through it. Along with Buzzards Bay and Bournedale, it is one of three communities that comprise the county of Barnstable north of the Cape Cod Canal.

In addition to its residential areas, Sagamore Beach has a small commercial district located near the Sagamore Bridge and along Massachusetts Route 3A, which passes through the bridge. It also adjoins the Scusset Beach State Reservation, a public-access, beachfront recreation site located at the northern end of Cape Cod Canal.

Developments in the 2000s included a new post office, a fire station, and the creation of several new subdivisions. In December 2023, the federal government awarded an initial down payment of $372 million in grants for the renovation of the Sagamore and Bourne Bridges, both of which are nearing their obsolescence. The two bridges connect Cape Cod to Massachusetts proper, arching over the canal and allowing the passage of pedestrian and vehicular traffic.

== History ==
In 1620, the colonial ship Mayflower from Britain landed in what is now modern Plymouth, north of Sagamore Beach. Roughly 30 Native American tribes were in what is now the southeastern Massachusetts area, with the Wampanoag tribe among them being the most populous. A heavily trodden trail used by native tribes to reach the eastern reaches of Cape Cod in the 17th century crossed the region. The European settlers, making the perilous journey across the Atlantic Ocean, permanently settled the area in the year 1637, gradually increasing in numbers during the succeeding decades. The trail, later widened by settlers, became the main transportation artery to Cape Cod. What is now the state road of Massachusetts Route 6A roughly follows the trail's historical route. The names of numerous streets and roads in Sagamore pay homage to the indigenous peoples who had dwelt upon the land. Some examples of the names include Tecumseh, Siasconset, Sachem, Scusset, Manomet, Indian Trail, Indian Hill, and Fox Run. Both the names sagamore and sachem are descended from Native American titles.

Initially a village, Sandwich of Massachusetts was divided to create the town of Bourne in 1884. After the dredging for the Cape Cod Canal project was started in 1884, Sagamore Beach became the center of commerce for the town. The population significantly increased in 1905 when the Christian Endeavor Society, a Christianity promoting group, founded a summer colony in the region, and some of the Victorian homes built by the colony still line the bluffs along the coastline. The Sagamore Beach Colony Club, established in 1909, aims to continue the traditions and lifestyle of locals and serves as a vital community resource today.

== Demographics ==
The village of Sagamore Beach is primarily a residential area. As of 2021, it had a resident population of 4,230 people, an 11.5% year-on-year increase compared to 2020. Its median household income was $106,917 USD, 51% higher than the national median, and 20% higher than the state median ($89,026 USD). The median age for its residents stood at 37.8 years, and has been steadily decreasing in recent years owing to the inflow of young settlers. The homeownership rate was 81.2% in 2021, with the median property value being around $433,000 USD.

Sagamore Beach's demography is mostly composed of white people, with 81.3% of its residential population falling into this category. Hispanics, Asians, and African Americans make up most of the rest. 96.5% of its population are U.S. citizens, and all households surveyed reporting English to be their primary shared language in 2021. The three largest industries in Sagamore are retail, healthcare/social assistance, and construction, with 363, 321, and 215 workers, respectively. A total of ~2,420 people were employed in 2021, or about 57% of its populace.

== Politics ==
The village is located in Massachusetts's 9th congressional district, represented by Democrat William R. Keating in the House of Representatives since 2013. Sagamore Beach comprises ~0.5% of the district's population.

== See also ==
- Cape Cod
- Sagamore Bridge
- Massachusetts's 9th congressional district
