= Bourne Highway Bridge =

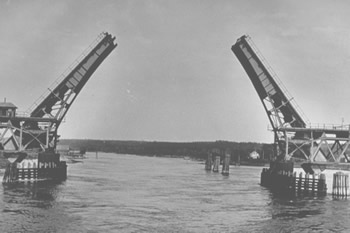
- Bourne Highway Bridge, c. 1911
- Coordinates: 41.7448°N 70.6009°W
- Carried: Perry Avenue
- Crossed: Cape Cod Canal
- Locale: Bourne, Massachusetts (Buzzards Bay-Cape Cod)

Characteristics
- Design: Scherzer double-leaf rolling lift bridge
- Total length: 729 feet (222 m)
- Width: 30 feet (9.1 m)
- Longest span: 160 feet (49 m)
- Clearance below: 41 feet (12 m)

History
- Construction start: August 10, 1910
- Construction end: June 1911
- Closed: June 22, 1935
- Demolished: December 1935

The Bourne Highway Bridge was a bascule bridge in the town of Bourne, Massachusetts, that spanned the Cape Cod Canal. It was in use from 1911 until 1935.

== History ==
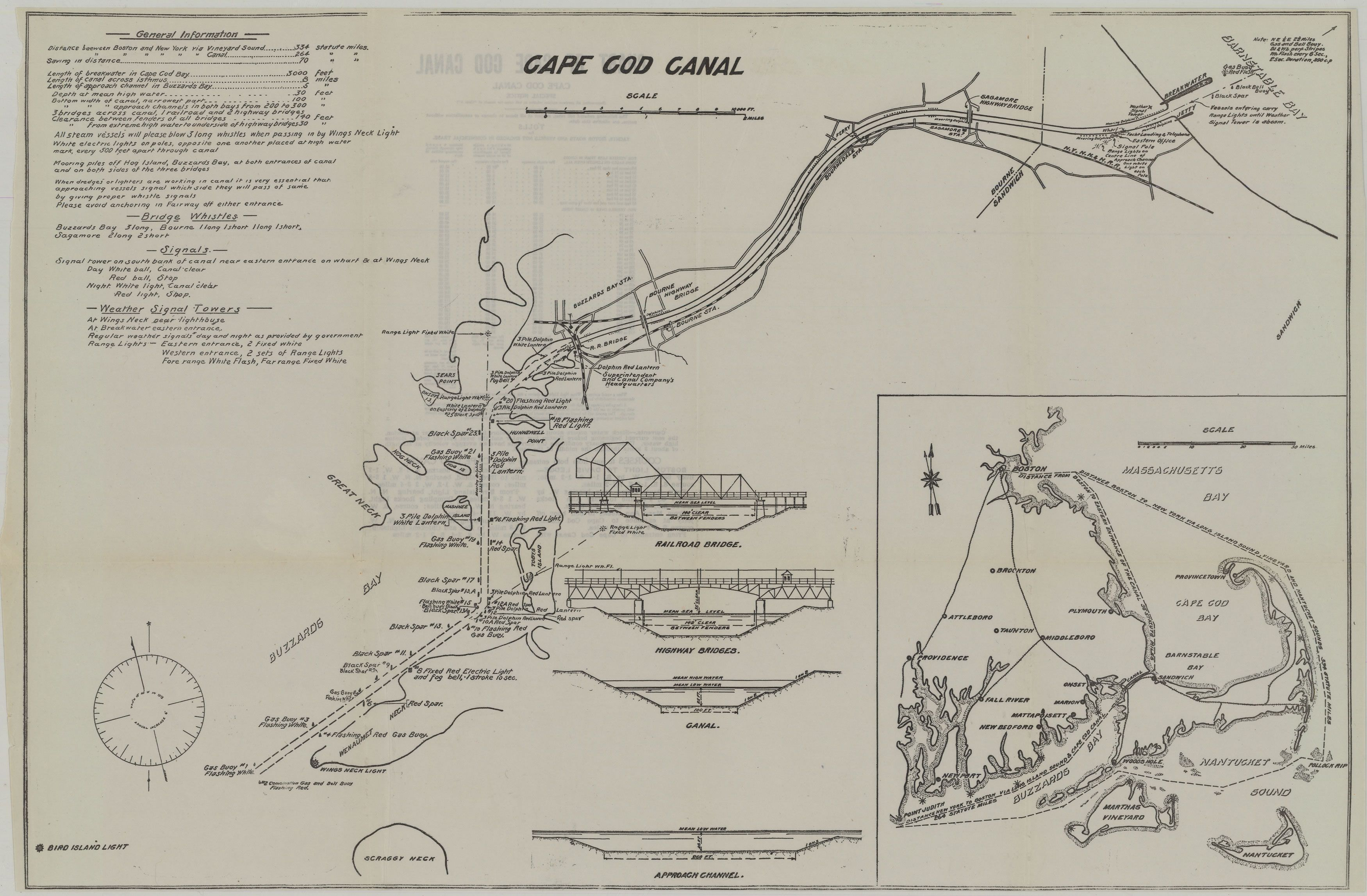
A 1922 map of the Cape Cod Canal, including the Bourne Highway Bridge

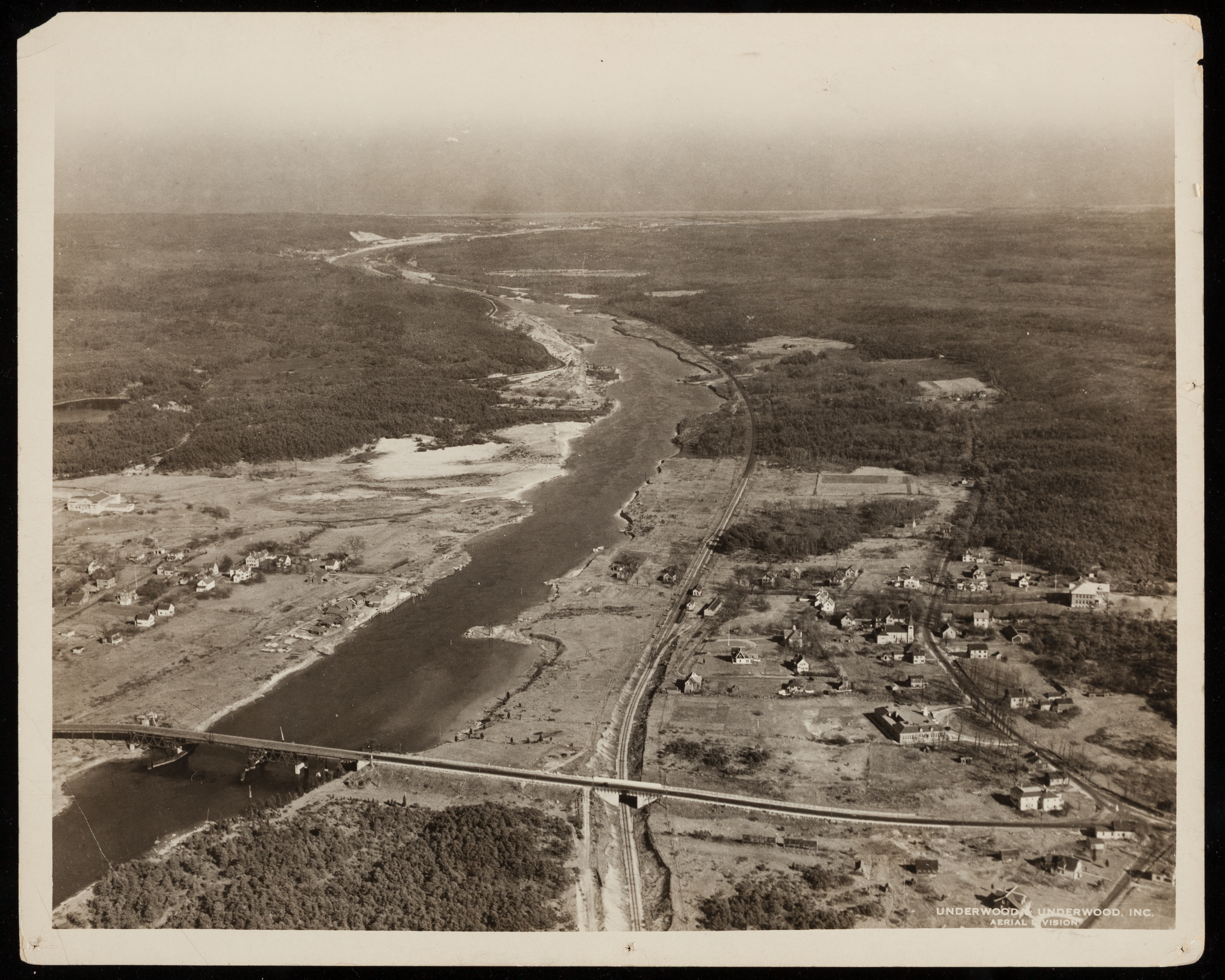
A 1925 aerial view of Bourne and the bridge

Work on the bridge began on August 10, 1910, during construction of the Cape Cod Canal. The bridge abutments were completed by December. In April 1911, the bridge was reported as being nearly completed. Reports at that time noted that once the new bridge was opened, an existing bridge over the Monument River in Bourne would be closed. On May 20, the bridge was physically opened (lifted) for the first time. In late June, the bridge was described as "ready", with plans being made for its immediate opening.

In May 1923, two people in an automobile crashed through fencing on the bridge and into the canal. The driver, Professor William Wright of Harvard, drowned, while his daughter was rescued. In March 1935, a driver from the West Roxbury neighborhood of Boston survived a 35-foot (11 m) drop in his car after it skidded off the approach to the bridge and landed at the edge of the canal.

The greatest amount of traffic to cross the bridge was 14,000 cars, recorded one day during the summer of 1934. The bridge was removed from service on June 22, 1935, with the opening of the new Bourne Bridge and Sagamore Bridge. As of the end of 1935, the bridge was being disassembled and removed.

Circa 2008, volunteers and residents of the Buzzards Bay section of Bourne created a scenic viewpoint named "Three Mile Look" on the former site of the bridge on the mainland side of the canal.

== See also ==
- List of crossings of the Cape Cod Canal
