= Bournedale, Massachusetts =

Village in Massachusetts, United States

Coordinates: 41°46′31″N 70°33′44″W

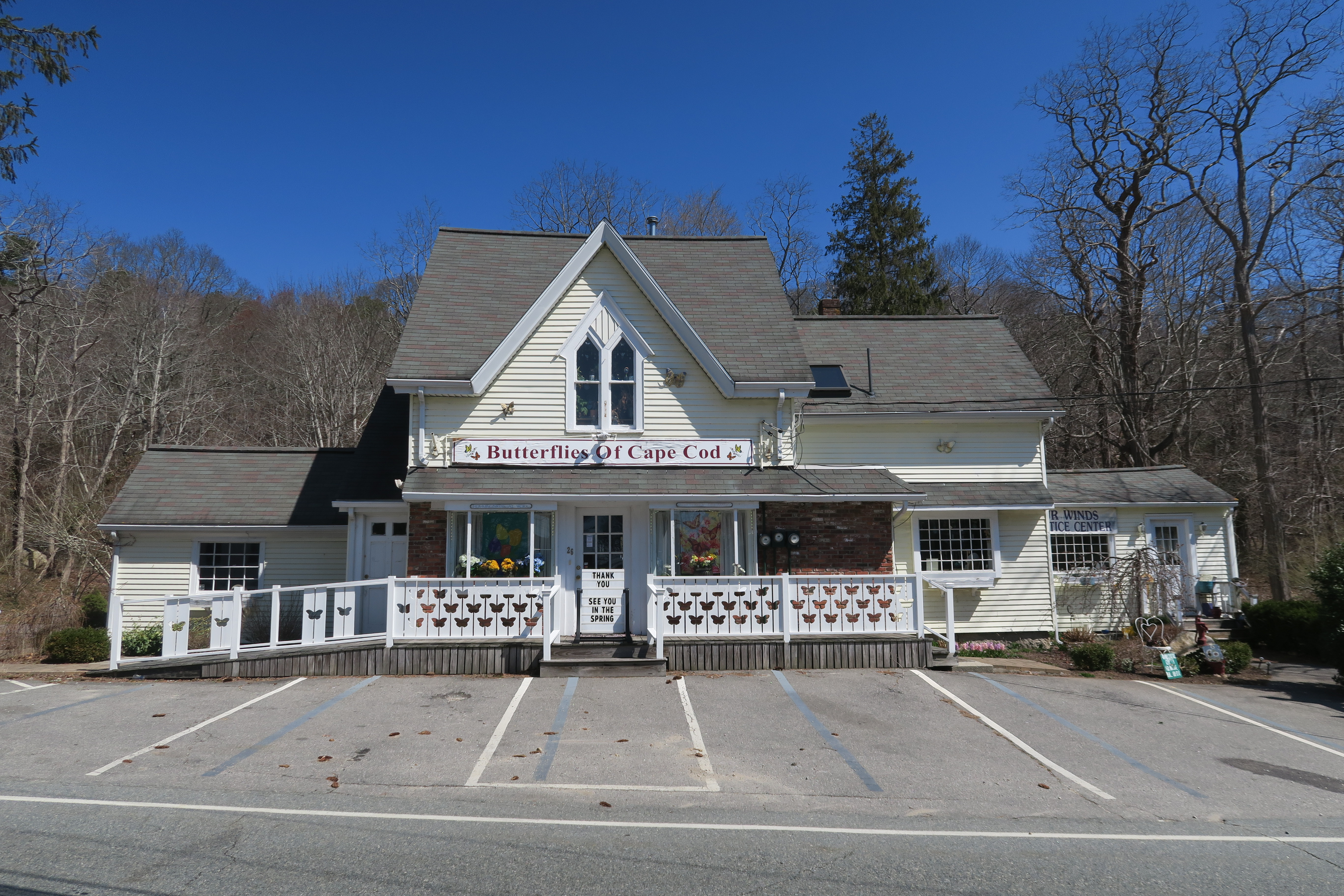
A business in Bournedale

Bournedale is a village in the town of Bourne in Barnstable County, Massachusetts, United States, fronting Sagamore Beach, Buzzards Bay and the middle of the Cape Cod Canal. Along with Buzzards Bay and Sagamore Beach, it is one of only three communities in Barnstable County that are north of the Cape Cod Canal.
