= Cataumet Schoolhouse =

- U.S. National Register of Historic Places
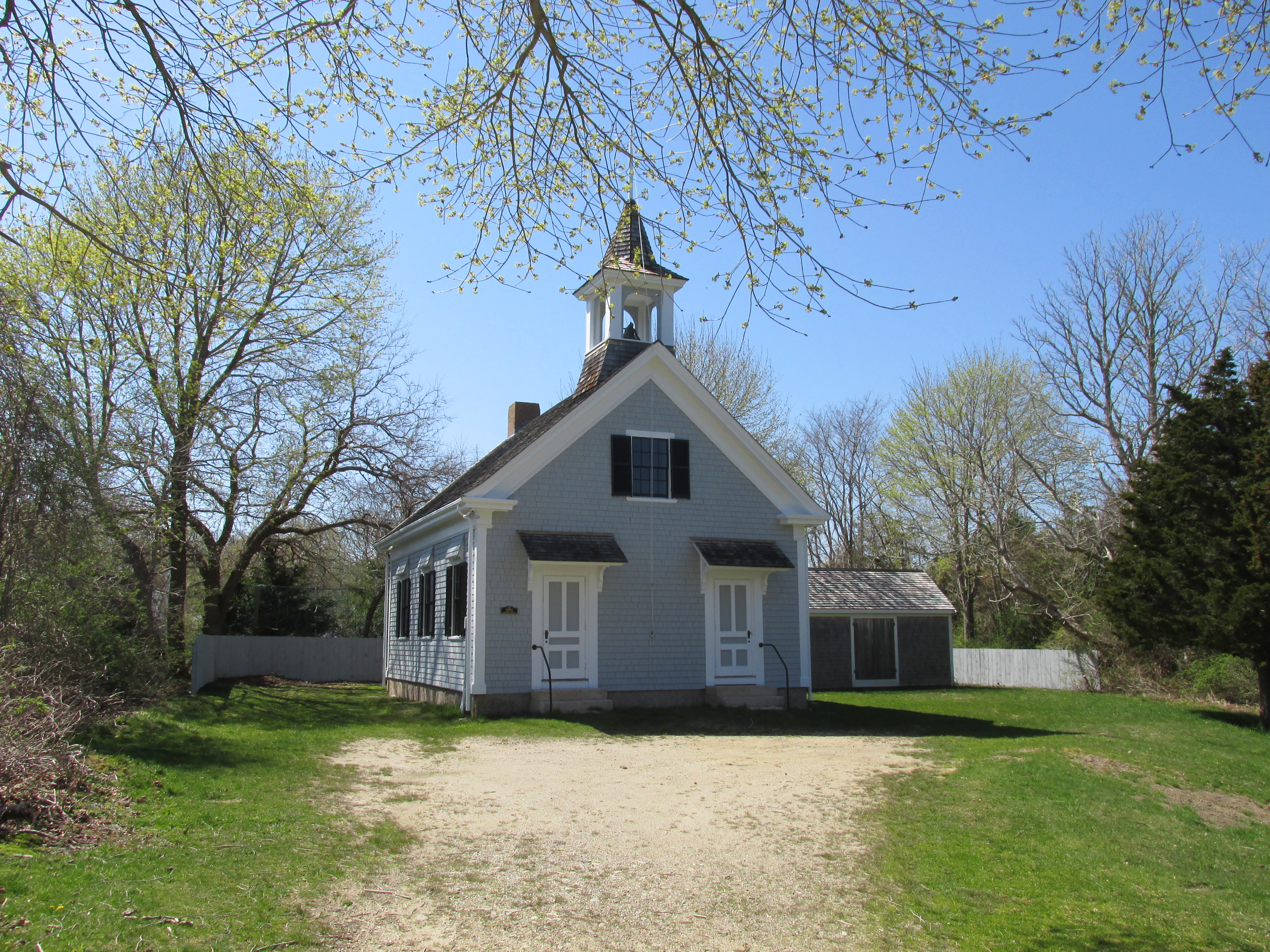

- Location within Cape Cod Location within Massachusetts Location within the United States
- Location: 1200 County Road, Bourne, Massachusetts
- Coordinates: 41.67029°N 70.60833°W
- Area: less than one acre
- Built: 1894
- Built by: West, James
- NRHP reference No.: 100004268
- Added to NRHP: August 15, 2019

The Cataumet Schoolhouse is a historic school building at 1200 County Road in Bourne, Massachusetts. Built in 1894, it served the town as a schoolhouse until 1934, and then as a community center until 1960. It is a well-preserved example of a 19th-century one-room schoolhouse, and was listed on the National Register of Historic Places in 2019.

== Description and history ==
The Cataumet School is set on the west side of County Road in Bourne's southern Cataumet neighborhood. It is set near the back of a .75-acre (0.30 ha) lot on the west side of the road, between Depot Road and Swan Circle. It is a single-story wood frame structure, with a gabled roof and wooden shingled exterior. The building corners have Greek Revival pilasters, with an entablature extending along the sides. The front facade has a pair of symmetrically placed entrances, each sheltered by a shed-roof hood supported by Victorian brackets. A single window occupies the gable end above the entrances. A small belfry rises above the roof, with square corner posts supporting a short spire. The interior of the building retains its original form, with a pair of entry vestibules (one each for boys and girls), and a large classroom with original chalkboards, desks, and finishes.

The town of Bourne was incorporated out of Sandwich in 1884. The new town built schoolhouses throughout its villages in the following years, with this schoolhouse, built in 1894, the second-last to be built. It was built on the site of an older schoolhouse erected by the town of Sandwich in 1864. In the first quarter of the 20th century, the town began consolidating its district schools, and this one was closed in 1930. Most of its district schools were sold or repurposed; the Cataumet Schoolhouse and the Bournedale Village School are the only schoolhouses still owned by the town. It was built by James West, a nearby resident, for $1,200.

Gallery photos are from 2003 during the peak of renovation.

== Image gallery ==
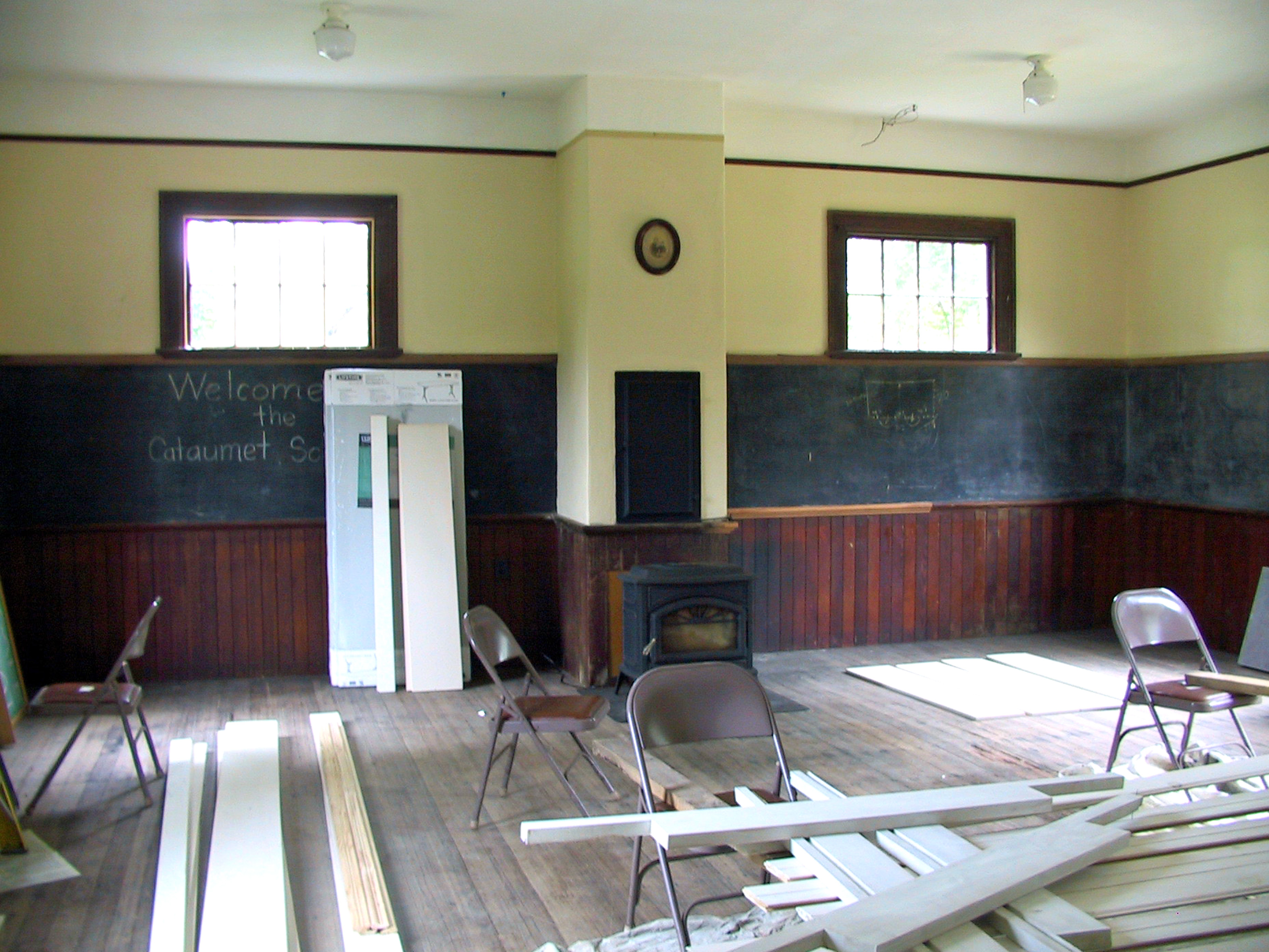
Cataumet Schoolhouse interior while under renovation in 1983. Labor and materials were all donated.

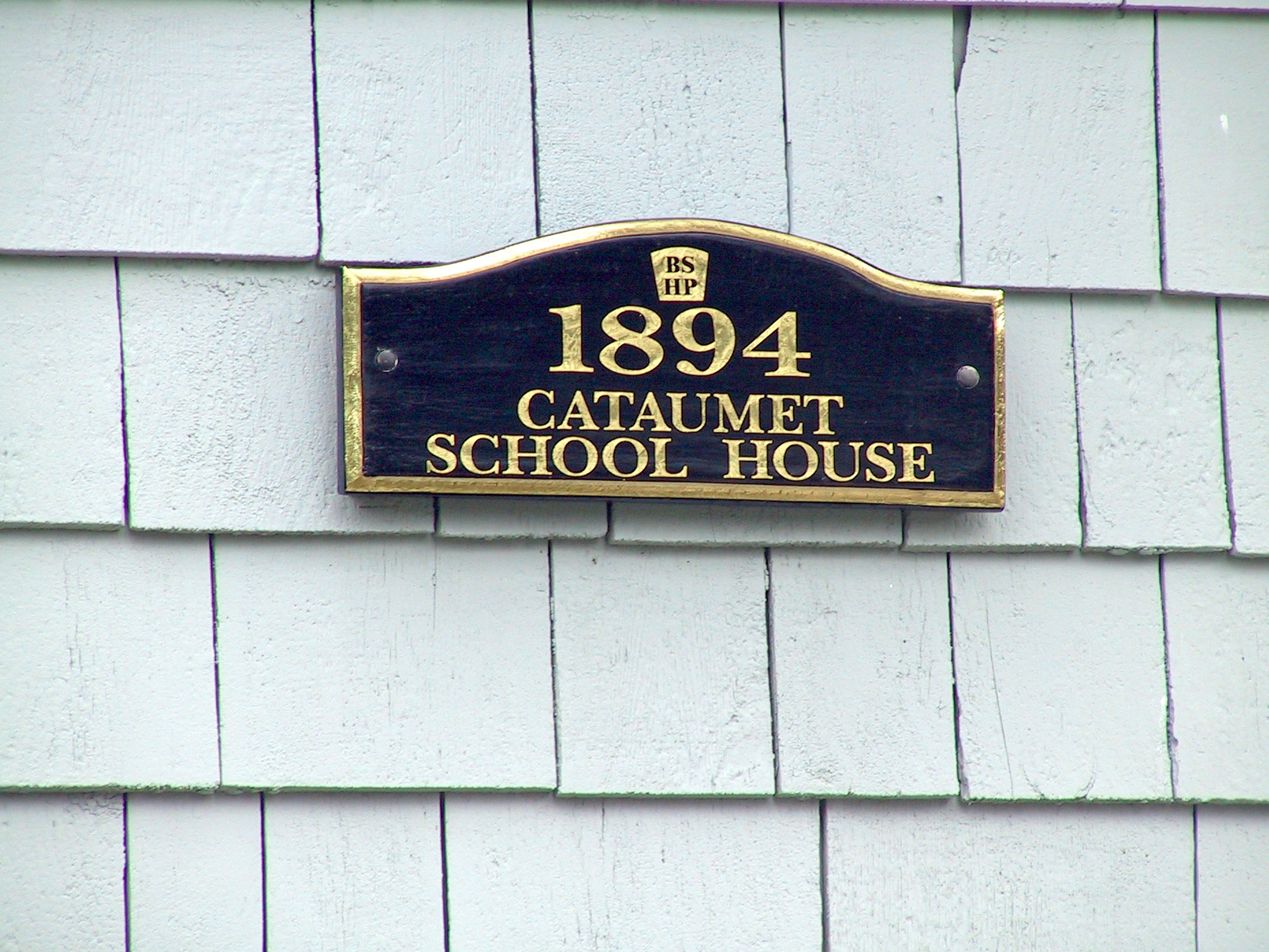
Plaque alongside front entry door.

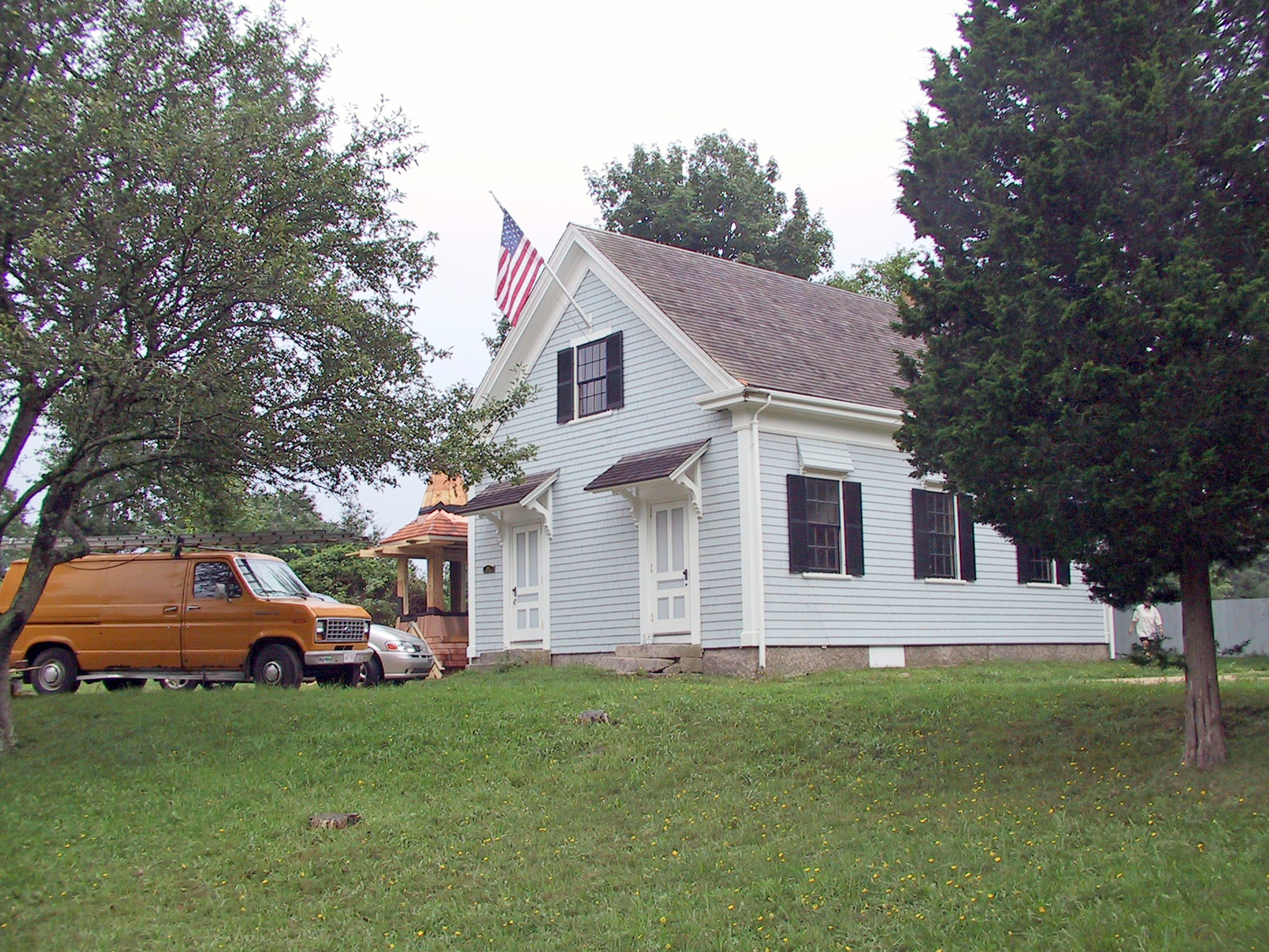
Belfry, front of schoolhouse, craftsmen vehicles

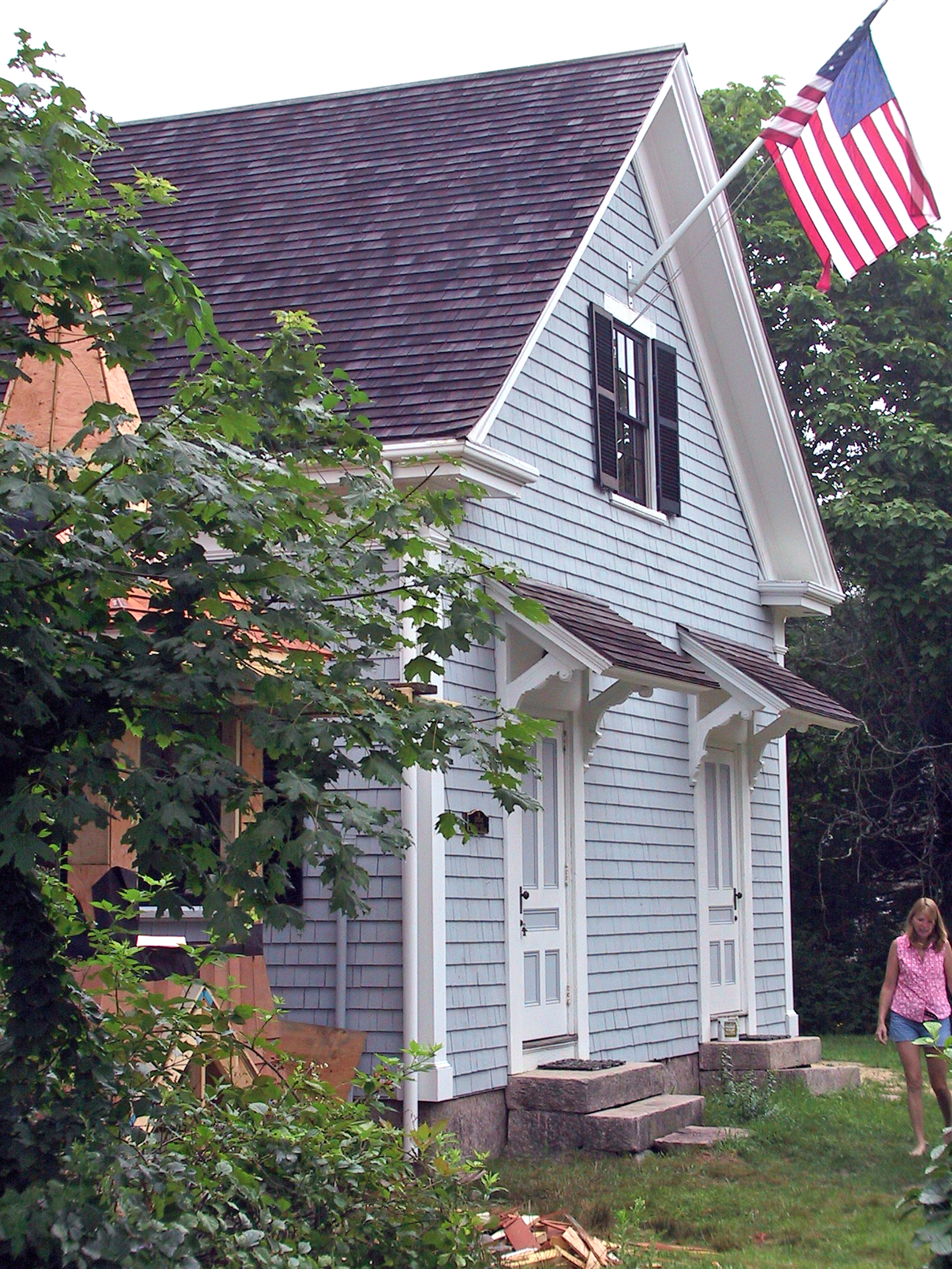
The belfry was constructed alongside the school and lifted to the roof after most work was done.

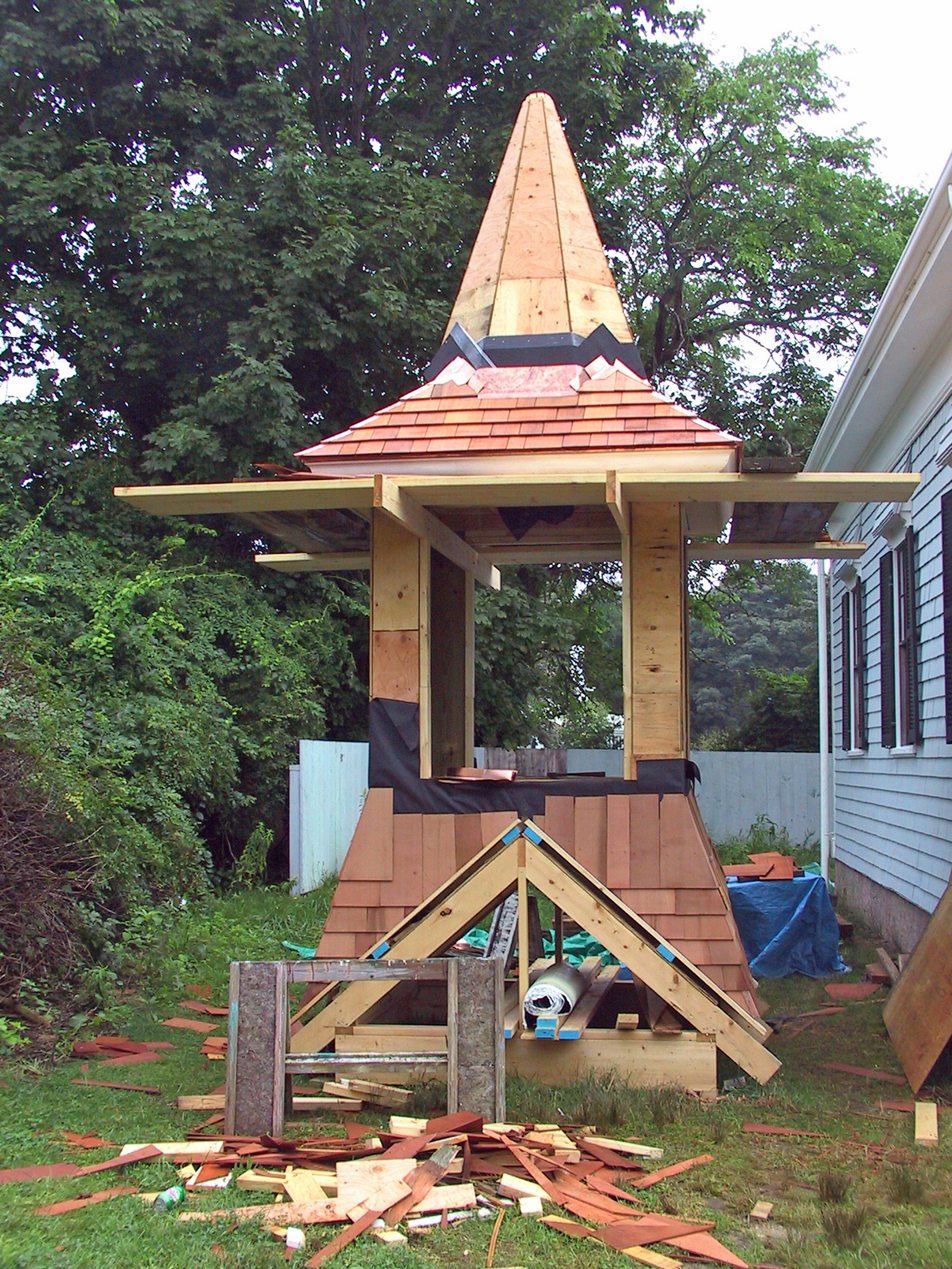
Belfry construction took several weeks with detailed craftwork done by various volunteers.

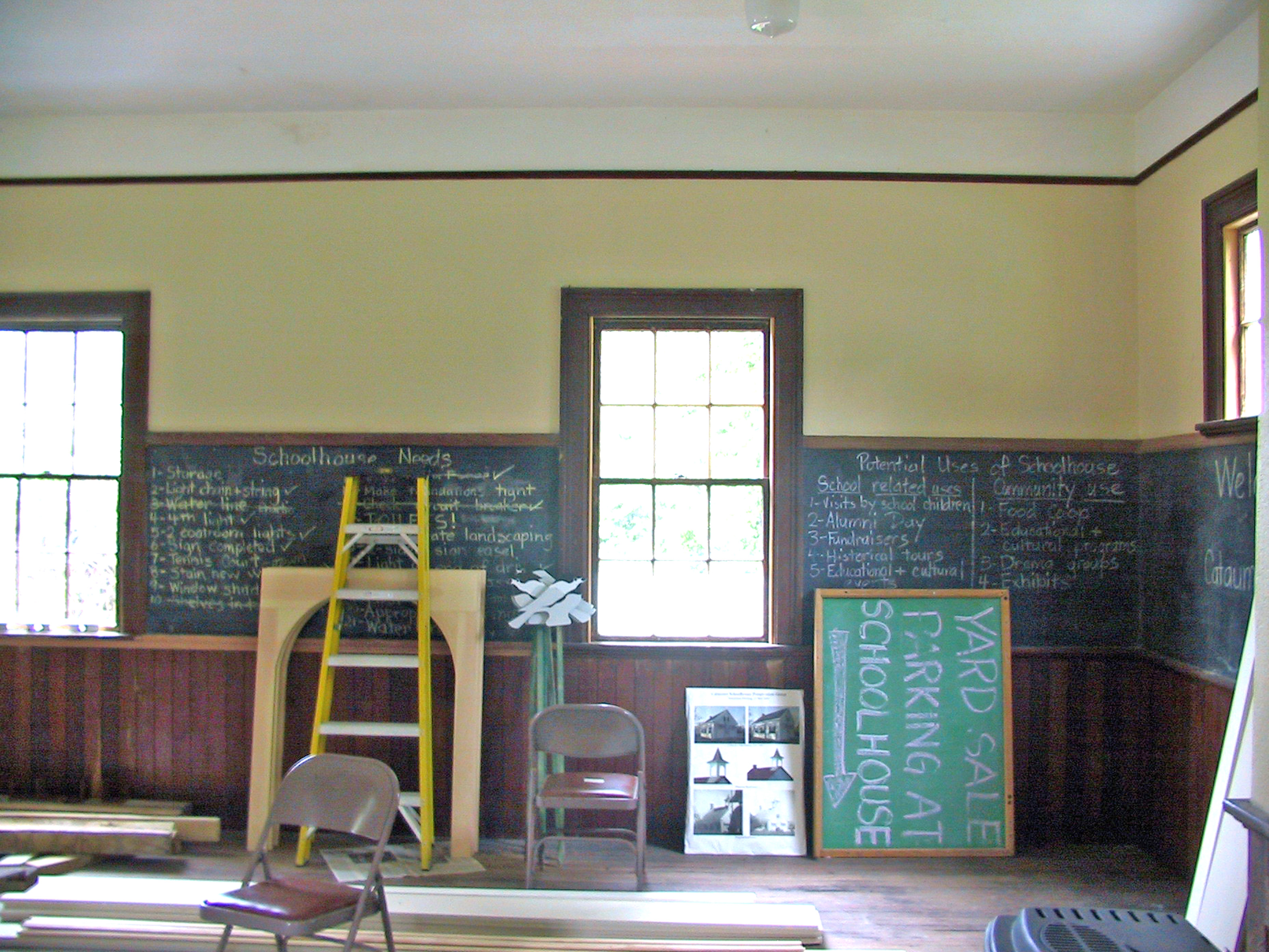
Work underway inside.

== See also ==
- National Register of Historic Places listings in Barnstable County, Massachusetts
