= New York Central Tugboat 16 =

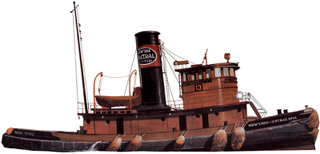
- New York Central Tugboat 13, a sister of Tugboat 16

History
- Owner: New York Central Railroad
- Builder: Jersey Drydock & Transportation Company
- Launched: 1924
- Out of service: 1969
- Fate: Scrapped 2006

General characteristics
- Tonnage: 103 GRT 51 NRT
- Length: 90 ft (27 m)
- Beam: 19 ft 5 in (5.92 m)
- Draft: 10 ft 2 in (3.10 m)
- Depth: 10 ft 3 in (3.12 m)
- Decks: 1
- Propulsion: Falk gearbox, single screw

New York Central Tugboat 16 was a railroad tugboat built in 1924 for car float service. The vessel operated with the New York Central Railroad from its completion until its retirement in 1969. In 1982, it was moved to dry land at Bourne, Massachusetts, where it remained as a local attraction until it was dismantled in 2006.

== History ==
Tugboat 16 was a non-condensing steam-powered tug built in 1924 by the Jersey Drydock & Transportation Company in Elizabeth, New Jersey. She operated in the car float industry in New York Harbor until 1969, when she was retired and stored at the Witte Marine scrapyard along Arthur Kill on Staten Island.

In the early 1980s, a restaurant owner from Bourne, Massachusetts, was looking for an attention-grabbing attraction for his restaurant which was located alongside Belmont Circle, near the Bourne Bridge. Several retired tugs were inspected and Tugboat 16 was deemed to be most worthy to be displayed on land. The tug was then moved to another yard to get prepared for a tow to Boston, where her bottom was cut off at the waterline and she was placed on a barge with the deckhouse and pilothouse removed. Then, the barge was towed to Buzzards Bay where Tugboat 16 was transferred onto house-moving flatbeds and moved to Belmont Circle, adjacent to Grandma's Restaurant.

For the next twenty-four years Tugboat 16 sat at the bottom of the Route 25, Route 28, and Route 6 access ramp to the Bourne Bridge, serving as an ice cream shop and a local tourist attraction. On 2 July 2006, the tugboat was scrapped because of the building of a CVS Pharmacy and car park on the site. The pilothouse and stack were moved to a museum in Kingston, New York.
