= Bourne Bridge =

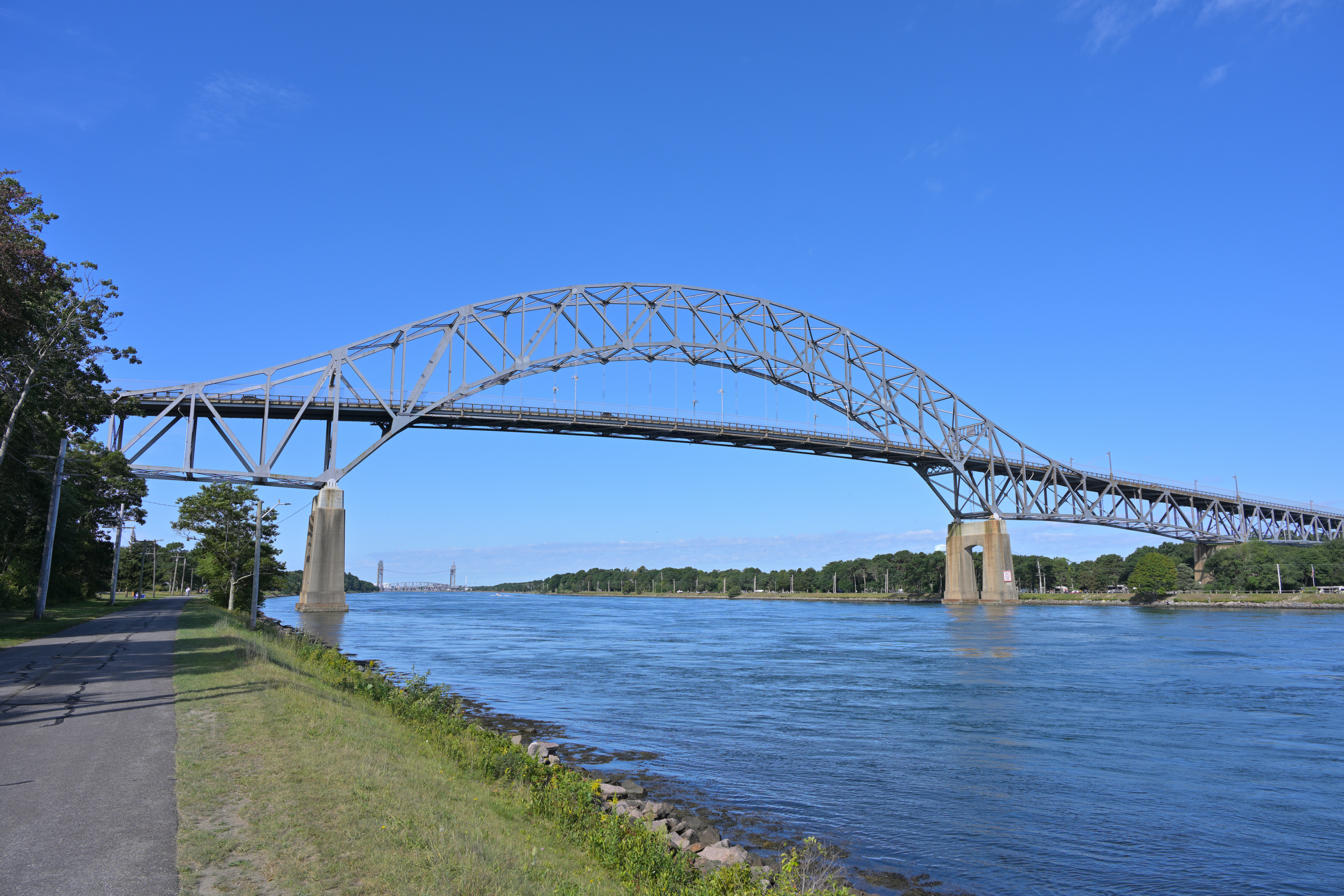
- Cape Cod Canal – Bourne Bridge
- Coordinates: 41°44′51.73″N 70°35′22.31″W
- Carries: 4 lanes of Route 28
- Crosses: Cape Cod Canal
- Locale: Bourne, Massachusetts (Buzzards Bay-Cape Cod)
- Maintained by: United States Army Corps of Engineers

Characteristics
- Design: Arch bridge with suspended deck
- Total length: 2,384 ft (727 m)
- Width: 45 ft (14 m)
- Height: 274 ft (83.5152 m)
- Longest span: 616 ft (188 m)
- Clearance below: 135 ft (41 m)

History
- Construction start: 1933
- Opened: June 22, 1935

Statistics
- Toll: None

Location
- Interactive map of Bourne Bridge

The Bourne Bridge in Bourne, Massachusetts, carries Route 28 across the Cape Cod Canal, connecting Cape Cod with the rest of Massachusetts. It won the American Institute of Steel Construction's Class "A" Award of Merit as the "Most Beautiful Steel Bridge" in 1934. Most traffic approaching from the west follows Route 25 which ends at the interchange with US 6 and Route 28 just north of the bridge. The highway provides freeway connections from Interstate 495 and Interstate 195.

== History ==
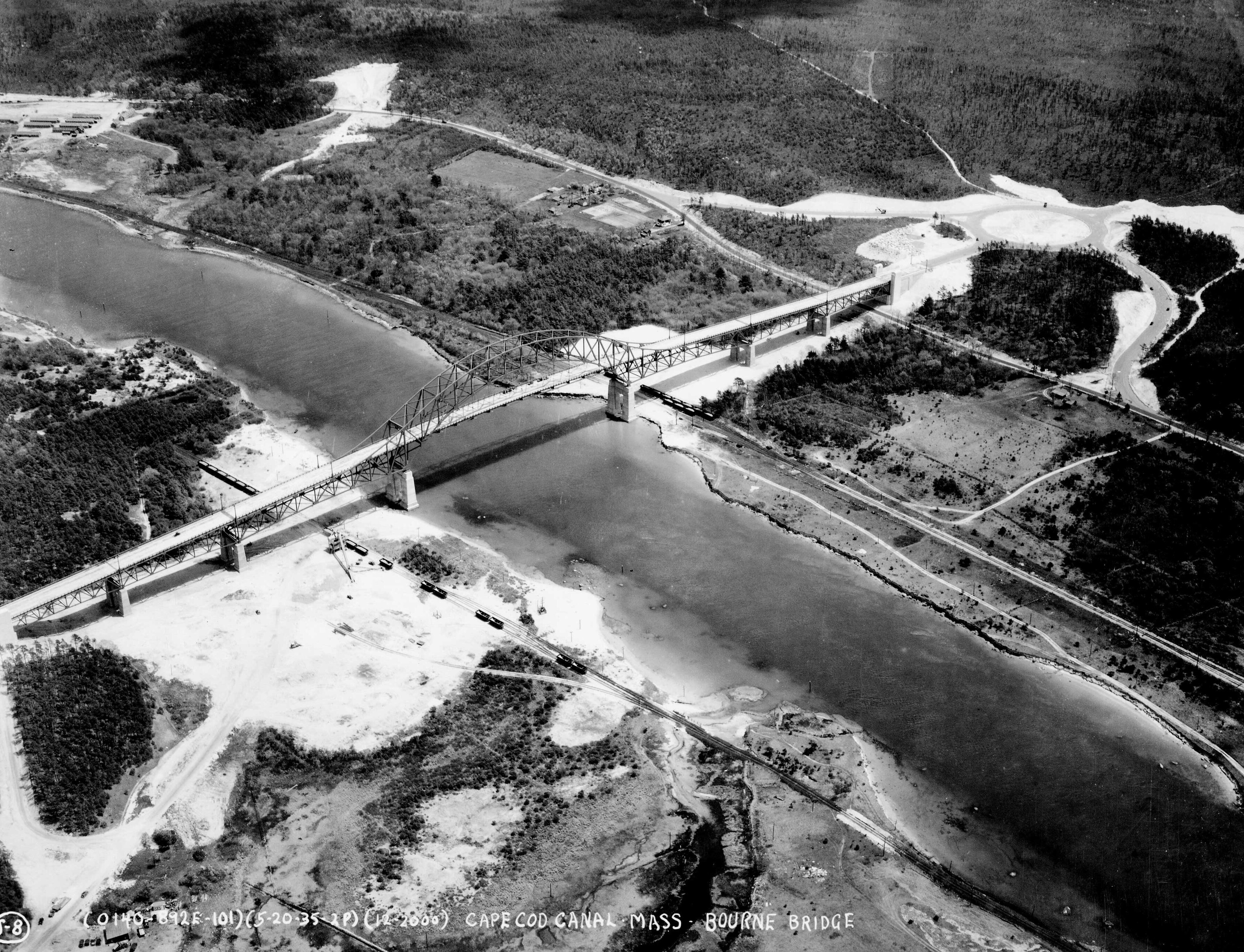
Bridge shortly after construction in January 1936

The bridge and its sibling the Sagamore Bridge were constructed beginning in 1933 by the Public Works Administration for the United States Army Corps of Engineers, which operates both the bridges and the canal. Interestingly, both bridges are not owned by the Massachusetts State Highway Administration. Each bridge carries four lanes of traffic over a 616-foot (188 m) main span, with a 135-foot (41 m) ship clearance. Construction ended in early 1935 and the bridge opened on June 22, 1935. The approaches to the main span of the Bourne Bridge are considerably longer than those of the Sagamore Bridge due to the topography of the land. The bridge replaced an earlier 1911 bascule bridge (drawbridge), the Bourne Highway Bridge, the original approaches of which are still accessible. The current structure was built to accommodate the widening of the canal.

The bridge commences at a major rotary on the Cape Cod end.

=== Suicide deterrent fences ===
Between 1967 and 1977, 36 people were recorded as having died by suicide from the Bourne and Sagamore bridges, and another 24 had attempted but either survived or were apprehended. From 1979 to 1983, as part of "major rehabilitation work," both of the bridges' four-foot high railings were replaced with suicide deterrent fencing. The 12-foot-high (3.7 m) fencing consists of one-inch (2.5 cm) round pickets spaced a maximum of six inches (15 cm) apart; the tops of the picket are bent on a seven-inch (18 cm) radius toward the roadway. In the 28-year period after the new fencing was installed (1984–2012), seven persons are known to have died by suicide from the bridges, and during 2013–2021, two attempts were prevented. The fencing was cited in 2021 as a possible model for bridges in Rhode Island.

On the mainland side, New York Central Tugboat 16 sat on dry land at the approach to the bridge from the rotary from 1982 to 2006, serving as a local attraction.

=== Future ===
In October 2019, the Army Corps of Engineers recommended replacing the bridge with a wider bridge with four travel lanes, one auxiliary lane in each direction, bike and pedestrian paths, shoulders, and a median. The recommendation said that replacement was more cost-effective than upgrading the existing bridge in order to reduce long summertime backups. With the cost of the project at $4 billion so far, it is struggling to move forward.

The Massachusetts DOT is following up on the 2019 study about the future of the bridge along with the Sagamore Bridge. The 2019 study concluded that improvements were needed to connectivity across the canal. The Cape Cod Bridges program is currently taking public input into the multi phased project and have unveiled different design types for feedback.

== Bicycle/pedestrian access ==
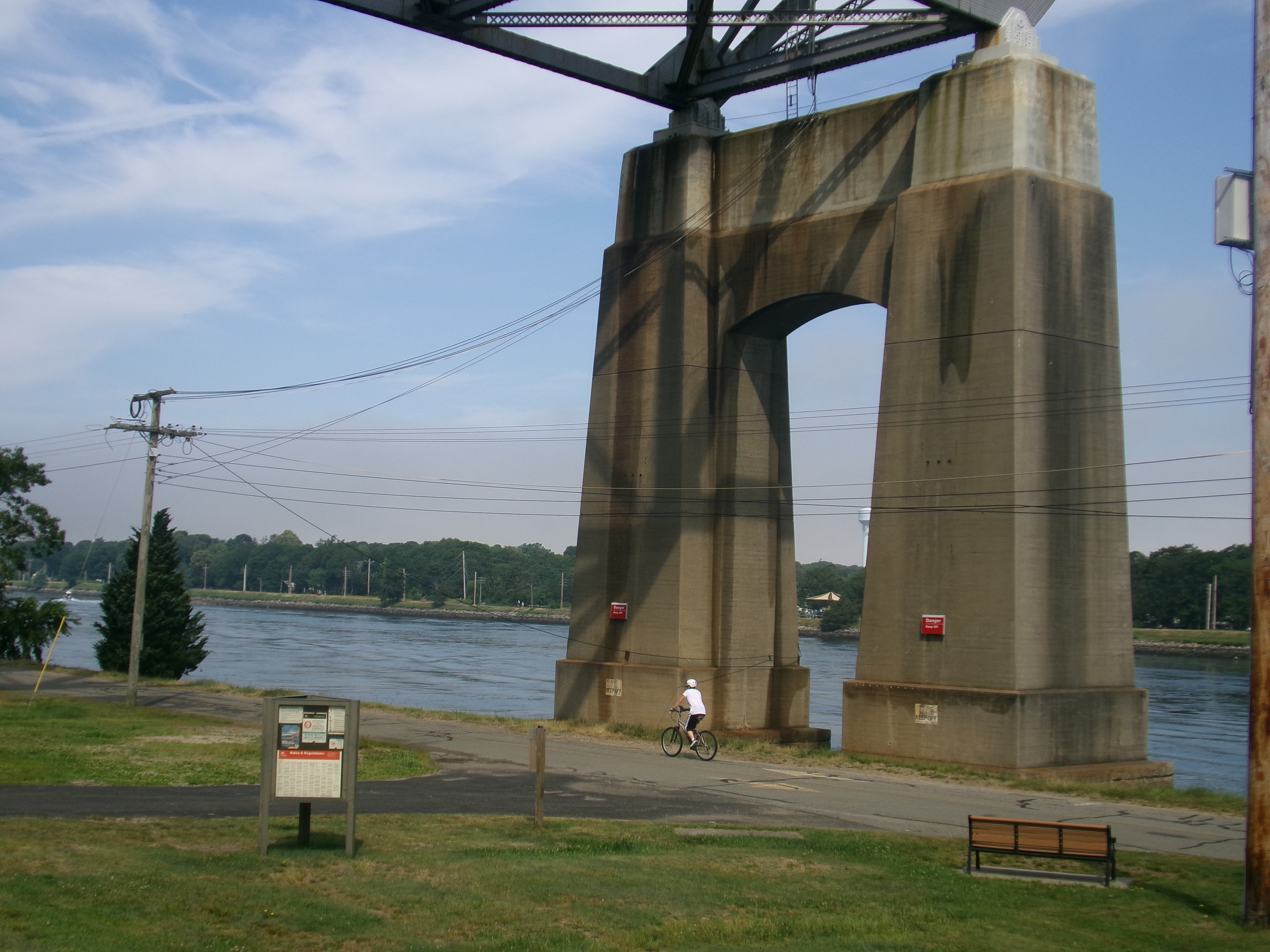
A cyclist passes under the Cape Cod side of the bridge via the road

There is a six-foot-wide (1.8 m) sidewalk for pedestrian and bicycle access on the west side of the bridge. The sidewalk is slightly raised, but there is no fence or barrier between it and car traffic, and cyclists are recommended to walk their bicycle. The bridge road is plowed in winter, although the sidewalk is sometimes unplowed and unpassable. The Bourne and Sagamore bridges are sometimes closed for safety during high winds.

== See also ==
- List of crossings of the Cape Cod Canal
