= Butler Point Military Reservation =

- Part of Harbor Defenses of New Bedford
- Marion, Massachusetts
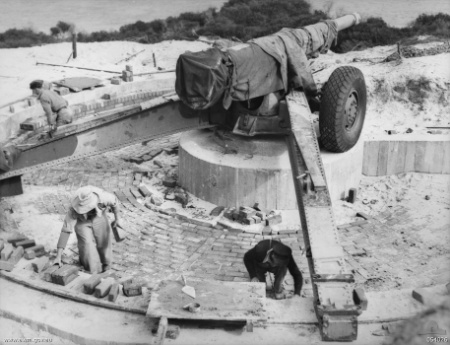
- A 155 mm gun on a Panama mount.

Site information
- Type: Coastal Defense
- Condition: partly buried

Location
- Location in Massachusetts
- Coordinates: 41°40′36″N 70°42′59″W

Site history
- Built: 1942
- Built by: United States Army
- In use: 1942–1946
- Battles/wars: World War II

Garrison information
- Garrison: Fort Rodman

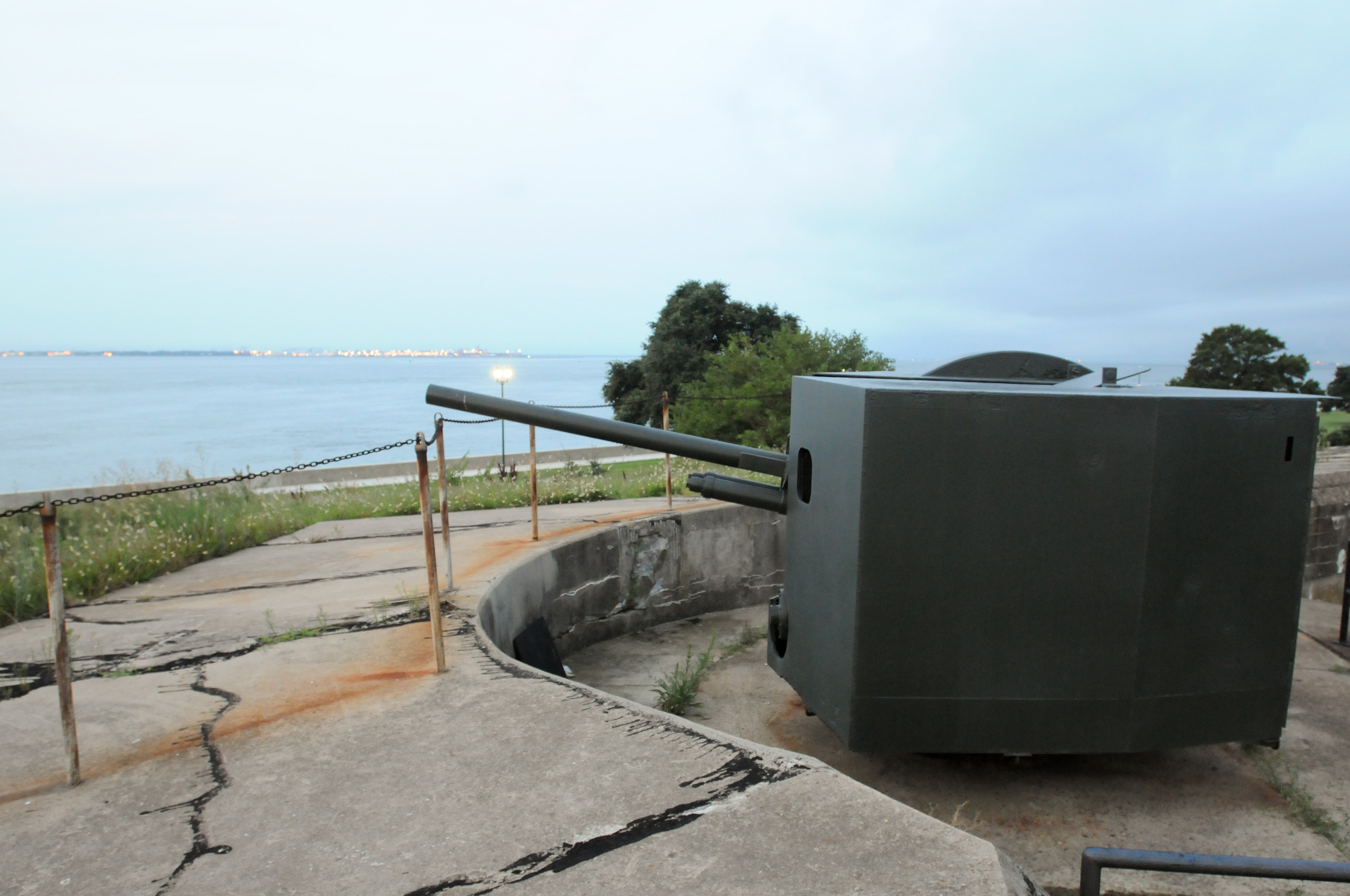
90 mm M1 gun on T3/M3 fixed seacoast mount at Fort Monroe, Virginia.

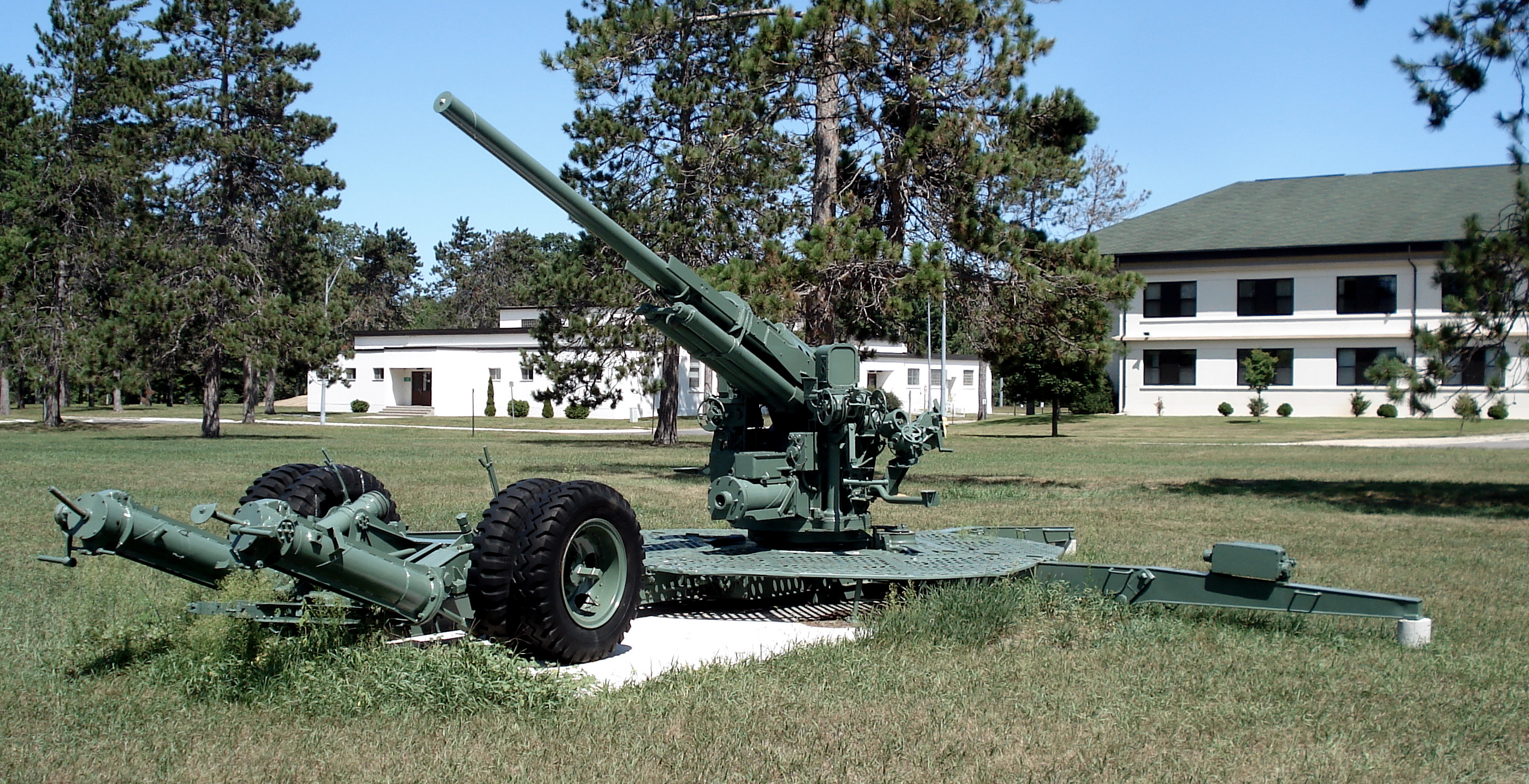
90 mm M1 gun on towed mount at CFB Borden, Canada.

Butler Point Military Reservation was a coastal defense site located in Marion, Massachusetts as part of the defenses of the Cape Cod Canal.

== History ==
The Butler Point Military Reservation was built on land purchased in 1942. Its mission was to protect the southern entrance of the Cape Cod Canal from possible air and naval attack. It was mirrored at the northern entrance by the Sagamore Hill Military Reservation. It never fired its guns in anger, but it did play an important part in the defense of the canal.

In 1942 the reservation had an unnamed battery of two 155 mm towed guns on "Panama mounts", circular concrete platforms for this type of gun. This battery was withdrawn in 1943 when an Anti-Motor Torpedo Boat (AMTB) battery of four 90 mm guns called AMTB 934 was built. This battery had an authorized strength of four 90 mm guns, two on fixed mounts and two on towed mounts, plus two towed 37 mm M1 guns or 40 mm Bofors M1 guns.

The site was disarmed in 1946.

== Present ==
The two Panama mounts remain, but are partly buried.

== See also ==
- Sagamore Hill Military Reservation
- Seacoast defense in the United States
- United States Army Coast Artillery Corps
- List of military installations in Massachusetts
