= Bournedale Village School =

- U.S. National Register of Historic Places
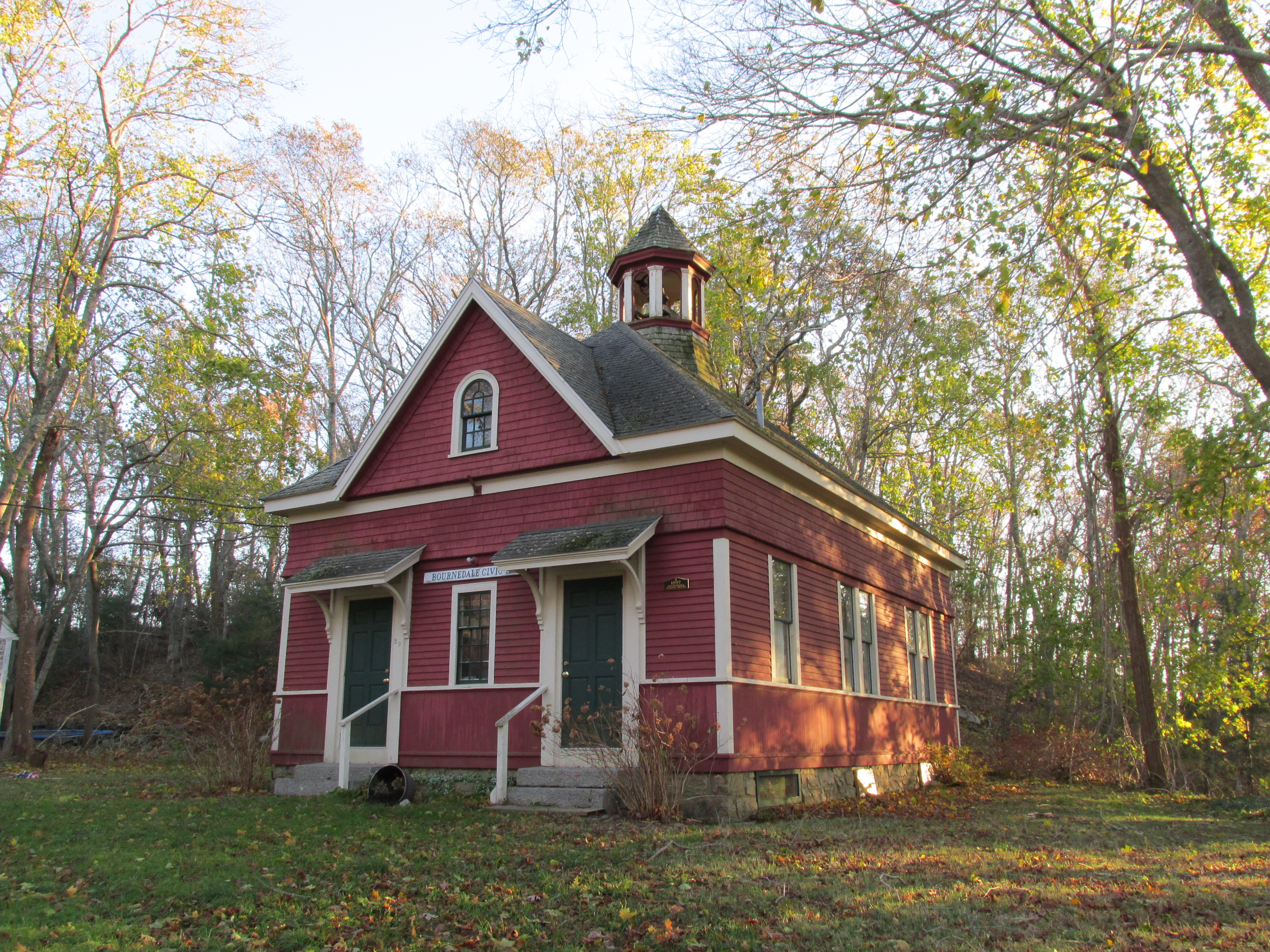

- Location within Cape Cod Location within Massachusetts Location within the United States
- Location: 29 Herring Pond Road, Bourne, Massachusetts
- Coordinates: 41°46′30″N 70°33′42″W
- Built: 1897
- Architectural style: Victorian Eclectic
- NRHP reference No.: 13000037
- Added to NRHP: February 27, 2013

The Bournedale Village School is a historic school building at 29 Herring Pond Road in Bourne, Massachusetts. Built in 1897, it was the last one-room schoolhouse built by the town, and is one of the few surviving 19th-century schoolhouses in all of Barnstable County. It was listed on the National Register of Historic Places in 2013. The building is now used by the Bournedale Civic Association as a meeting space.

== Description and history ==
The Bournedale Village School is located the central northern part of Bourne, on the north side of the Cape Cod Canal. It occupies a lot on the south side of a concurrence of Herring Pond and Bournedale Roads. It is a single-story wood frame structure, with a hip roof pierced on each side by a steeply pitched gable, and topped by an octagonal belfry. Its exterior is an eclectic finish of wood shingles, clapboards, and tongue-in-groove beaded boarding. Its main entry is sheltered by a shed-roof overhang supported by decoratively carved brackets. The interior has a pair of vestibules, which lead into the single classroom space, and have stairs descending to an unfinished basement. Although the vestibule floors have been covered in linoleum, the main room retains its original pine floors and painted plaster walls.

The school was built in 1897, on the site of a previous one-room schoolhouse destroyed by fire. It served the town as a school until 1925, when ongoing consolidation of district schools prompted the school's remaining students to be transferred to a graded school in Sagamore. The building continues to be owned by the town, but has been maintained and used by the Bournedale Civic Association since 1925.

== See also ==
- National Register of Historic Places listings in Barnstable County, Massachusetts
