= Sagamore Hill Military Reservation =

- Part of Harbor Defenses of Boston
- Sagamore Beach, Massachusetts
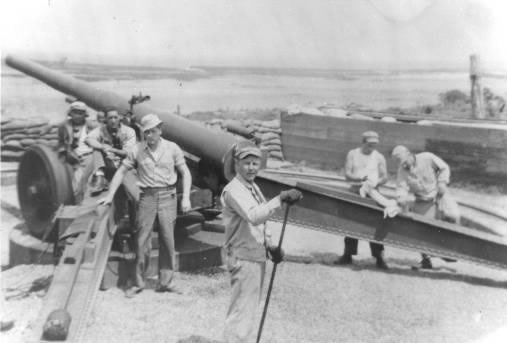
- A 155 mm gun and crew at Sagamore Hill, on a Panama mount.

Site information
- Type: Coastal Defense
- Owner: Massachusetts
- Controlled by: United States Army

Location
- Location in Massachusetts
- Coordinates: 41°46′38.28″N 70°30′11.50″W

Site history
- Built: 1940s
- Built by: United States Army
- In use: 1941–1945
- Battles/wars: World War II

Garrison information
- Garrison: Sagamore Beach, Massachusetts
- Occupants: Battery C, 241st Coast Artillery

Sagamore Hill Military Reservation was a coastal defense site located in Sagamore Beach, Massachusetts. Today, the site is the location of Scusset Beach State Reservation.

== History ==
Sagamore Hill Military Reservation was built on state land in 1941–1942 by Battery C, 241st Coast Artillery Regiment of the Massachusetts National Guard, beginning shortly after the attack on Pearl Harbor in December 1941. Its mission was to protect the northern terminus of the Cape Cod Canal from possible naval attack; it was mirrored at the southern entrance by Butler Point Military Reservation. The site had two "Panama mounts" (circular concrete platforms) for two towed 155 mm guns. It never fired its guns in defense but did play an important part in the defense of the canal. The reservation was deactivated on 1 April 1945.

=== The site now ===
The Panama mounts and battery commander's station of the two-gun 155 mm battery still remain, as well as several magazine "igloos".

== See also ==
- Butler Point Military Reservation
- Seacoast defense in the United States
- United States Army Coast Artillery Corps
- List of military installations in Massachusetts
