= List of crossings of the Cape Cod Canal =

Center of the canal

This is a list of crossings of the Cape Cod Canal from its east end in Cape Cod Bay to its west end in Buzzards Bay. The Cape Cod Canal, which opened in 1914, shortened the ocean route from New York City to Boston by 62 miles (100 km).

== Crossings ==
There are currently two automobile bridges and one railway bridge that cross the Cape Cod Canal, each of which opened in 1935. An earlier set of bridges, also two for automobiles and one for rail traffic, opened between 1911 and 1913. Construction of the Cape Cod Canal began in 1909; the canal initially opened in 1914 and was completed in 1916. Two earlier bridges (one automobile and one railroad) whose construction predated work on the canal and were built to span the Monument River (whose course was largely followed by the canal) are listed for completeness.

Entries in this list are ordered by location along the canal, from Cape Cod Bay to Buzzards Bay.

Crossing	Carries	Location	Built	Image	Coordinates	Ref.
Sagamore Highway Bridge (former)		Sagamore	1912–1913		41°46′30.21″N 70°31′59.52″W	
Sagamore Bridge	U.S. Route 6	Sagamore	1933–1935		41°46′34.14″N 70°32′36.13″W	
Bourne Bridge	Route 28	Bourne	1933–1935		41°44′52.33″N 70°35′22.52″W	
Highway bridge (former)	Old Bridge Road	Bourne	1897–1898		41.7459°N 70.5962°W	
Railroad bridge (former)	Cape Cod Branch Railroad	Bourne	1848		41.7449°N 70.6034°W	
Bourne Highway Bridge (former)	Perry Avenue	Bourne	1910–1911		41.7448°N 70.6009°W	
Cape Cod Canal Railroad Bridge	Cape Main Line (current)	Bourne	1933–1935		41°44′31.16″N 70°36′49.15″W	
Railroad bridge (former)	New York, New Haven and Hartford Railroad	Bourne	1910–1911		41°44′31.0″N 70°36′49.8″W	

== Proposed third road bridge ==
Due to gridlock during peak summer months, and growing traffic issues even off-season, constructing a third automobile bridge over the canal was a topic of discussion for many years.

Such a bridge was first proposed during the 1950s to connect the proposed Route 25 to U.S. Route 6 north of the canal. The Commonwealth of Massachusetts determined that due to overcapacity on the Sagamore Bridge, a third vehicular crossing would be necessary sometime after 1975. Another proposal, for the Southside Connector expressway, suggested twinning the Bourne Bridge as part of capacity improvements for the roadway. A local farmer fought the state's effort to cross her land with Route 25 for 25 years, eventually winning that fight in 1982.

The proposal for a third crossing was revived under the administration of Massachusetts Governor Deval Patrick. Identifying itself as Project SPAN, the effort floated two plans:

- One proposal would involve a three-lane, southbound-only bridge to the west of the current Sagamore Bridge. These additional lanes would allow the Sagamore Bridge's four narrow lanes (two each way) to be reduced to three wider northbound lanes. This proposal also called for open-road tolling, meaning that drivers would not have to slow down. There would also be an access road between Route 25 and Route 3, again proposed to cross the same farmland, which former Massachusetts Highway Administrator Frank DePaola admitted presents environmental challenges.
- The other proposal would place an additional bridge between the two bridges, a four-lane span similar to the existing bridges.

By September 2016, enthusiasm for a third road bridge had cooled and the state reported that it was considering two new bridges that would eventually replace the existing bridges. By January 2026, the state had completed substantial planning for four new bridges. Two separate arch bridges are to replace each of the existing road bridges. Informational materials from a series of public meetings show ongoing planning and permitting work, and continual public feedback.

== See also ==
- Cape Cod Canal Tunnel
