= New York Central Tugboat 13 =

Railroad tugboat (1887–2017)

Coordinates: 40.516588°N 74.246111°W

Tugboat 13
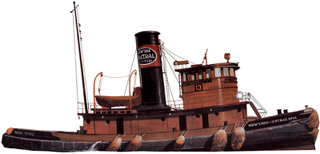

History

United States
- Owner: New York Central Railroad (1887–1955); Kosnac Floating Derrick Corporation (1955–)
- Builder: John H. Dialogue and Son
- Launched: 1887
- Renamed: Hay-De (c. 1960s)
- Identification: 155151
- Fate: Scrapped in 2017

General characteristics
- Tonnage: 103 GT 51 NT
- Length: 90 ft (27 m)
- Beam: 19 ft 5 in (5.92 m)
- Draft: 10 ft 2 in (3.10 m)
- Depth: 10 ft 3 in (3.12 m)
- Decks: 1
- Installed power: Two-cylinder compound steam engine 232 hp (173 kW) (1887–1950s); 2 × GM 6-110 diesel engines (1950s–)
- Propulsion: Falk gearbox, single screw

New York Central Railroad Tugboat 13 was a railway tugboat built in 1887 in Camden, New Jersey by John H. Dialogue and Son. The tugboat was built for the New York Central Railroad to push barges, called car floats, carrying railroad cars and other freight across the waterways of New York Harbor.

It originally had a steam engine of 232 horsepower (173 kW), replaced with two General Motors 6-110 diesel engines in the 1950s. The engines sat back-to-back and drove a central Falk gearbox, which turned the single propeller.

The hull was riveted and made of wrought iron.

After 2002, the tugboat underwent extensive renovation at Garpo Marine in Tottenville, Staten Island. Two new keel coolers from Fernstrum were installed in a recessed box in the hull to cool the engines.

Efforts to restore the ship seemingly failed in the intervening years, and it was scrapped in 2017.

== Other vessels built by John H. Dialogue and Son ==
- Hercules (1907) at the San Francisco Maritime Museum, hull number 204801.
- Susan Elizabeth (1886) launched as C. C. Clark and briefly served as New York Central No. 3. This boat was broken up in the fall of 2008 in the same yard in Tottenville, Staten Island, New York where Tugboat 13 was being restored.
- Elise Anne Connors (1881)

== Photos ==
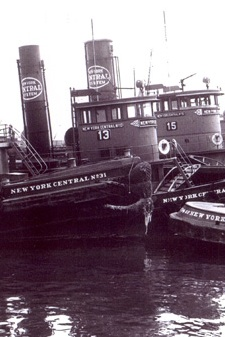
New York Central tugboats 13 and 15

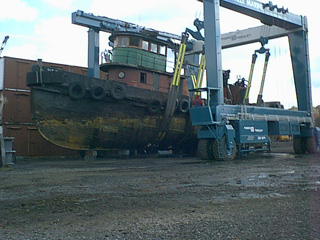
New York Central tugboat 13 on lift

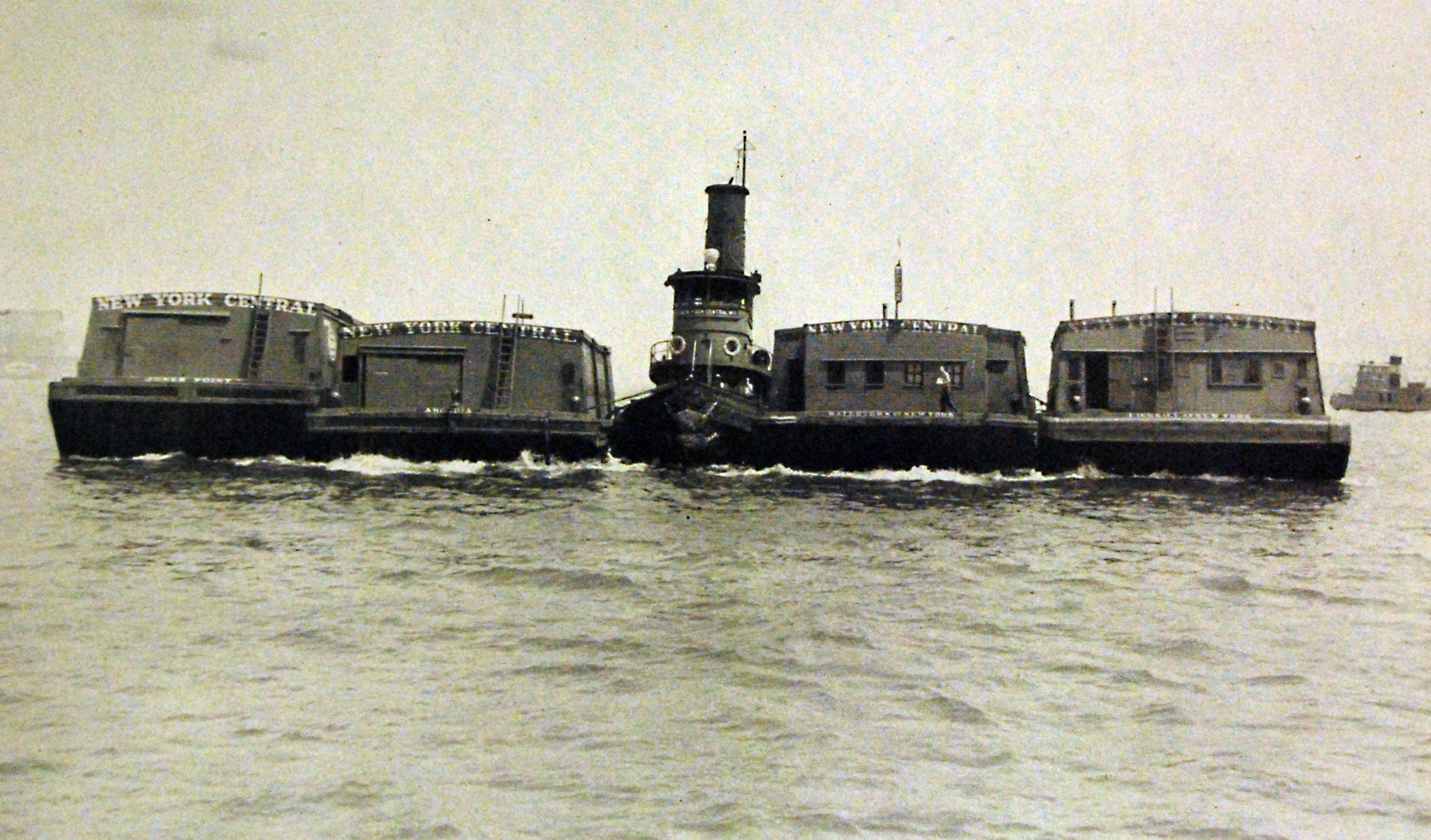
New York Central tugboat and barges

== See also ==
- New York Central Tugboat 16
