= Sagamore (ship) =

Several merchant ships and one US Navy tug have been named Sagamore.

- Lake Feodora, renamed Sagamore 1926–34, US screw steamboat, official number 219574. Wrecked in 1934.
- Kenordoc, US barge, official number 157506. Named David Z. Norton 1898–1904. Named Sagamore 1904–47. Named Kenordoc 1945–56. Scrapped 1956.
- Sagamore, US whaleback barge built in 1892, official number 57932. Sank after a collision in 1901.
- Sagamore, a UK cargo ship built in 1892 and torpedoed in 1917 by U-49.
- Sagamore, a whaleback cargo ship built in England in 1893, renamed Ilva and scuttled in 1917 by UC-69.
- Sagamore, US steam yacht, rebuilt as a freight propeller, official number 116211. Ultimate disposition unknown.
- Sagamore, US steamboat, launched in April 23, 1902 on Lake George
- Sagamore, US Navy tug. Named Sagamore 1944–48. Renamed John E. McAllister 1948–55. Scrapped 1955.
- Sagamore, a UK bulk carrier built in 1957, renamed Captain Alberto in 1975 and Tania in 1989 and scrapped in 1992.
- Sagamore, US cargo ship built 1996.
