= Sagamore, Pennsylvania =

Sagamore refers to the following places in the U.S. state of Pennsylvania:

- Sagamore, Armstrong County, Pennsylvania
- Sagamore, Fayette County, Pennsylvania
