= Sagamore Bridge =

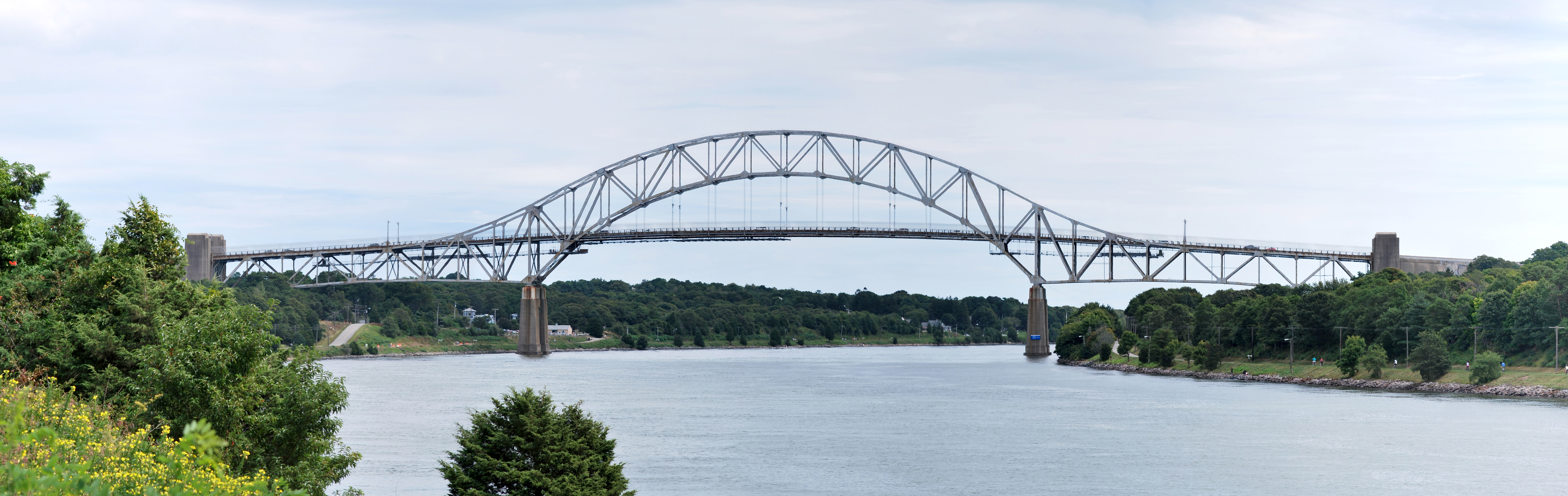
- Cape Cod Canal - Sagamore Bridge
- Coordinates: 41°46′34.14″N 70°32′36.13″W
- Carries: 4 lanes of US 6; 1 lane of Claire Saltonstall Bikeway
- Crosses: Cape Cod Canal
- Locale: Bourne, Massachusetts (Sagamore Beach-Cape Cod)
- Maintained by: U.S. Army Corps of Engineers

Characteristics
- Design: Arch bridge with suspended deck
- Total length: 1,408 ft (429 m)
- Width: 40 ft (12 m)
- Height: 275 ft (83.82 m)
- Longest span: 616 ft (188 m)
- Clearance below: 135 ft (41 m)

History
- Construction start: 1933
- Construction end: 1935
- Opened: June 22, 1935

Statistics
- Toll: None

Location
- Interactive map of Sagamore Bridge

The Sagamore Bridge in Sagamore, Massachusetts, carries Route 6 and the Claire Saltonstall Bikeway across the Cape Cod Canal, connecting Cape Cod with the mainland of Massachusetts. It is the more northeastern of two automobile canal crossings, the other being the Bourne Bridge. Most traffic approaching from the north follows Massachusetts Route 3 which ends at Route 6 just north of the bridge, and the bridge provides direct expressway connections from Boston and Interstate 93.

== History ==
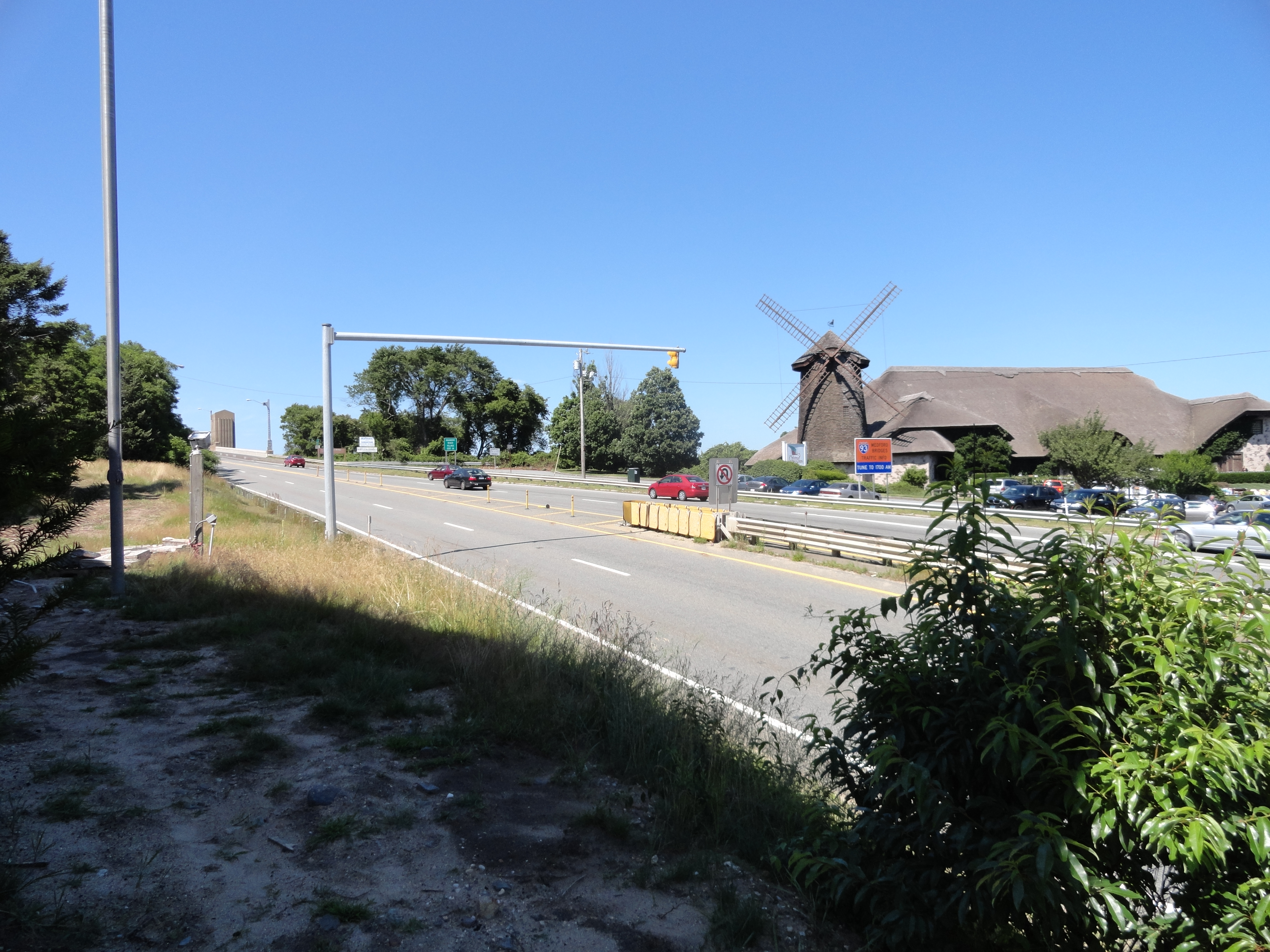
The southern approach to the bridge

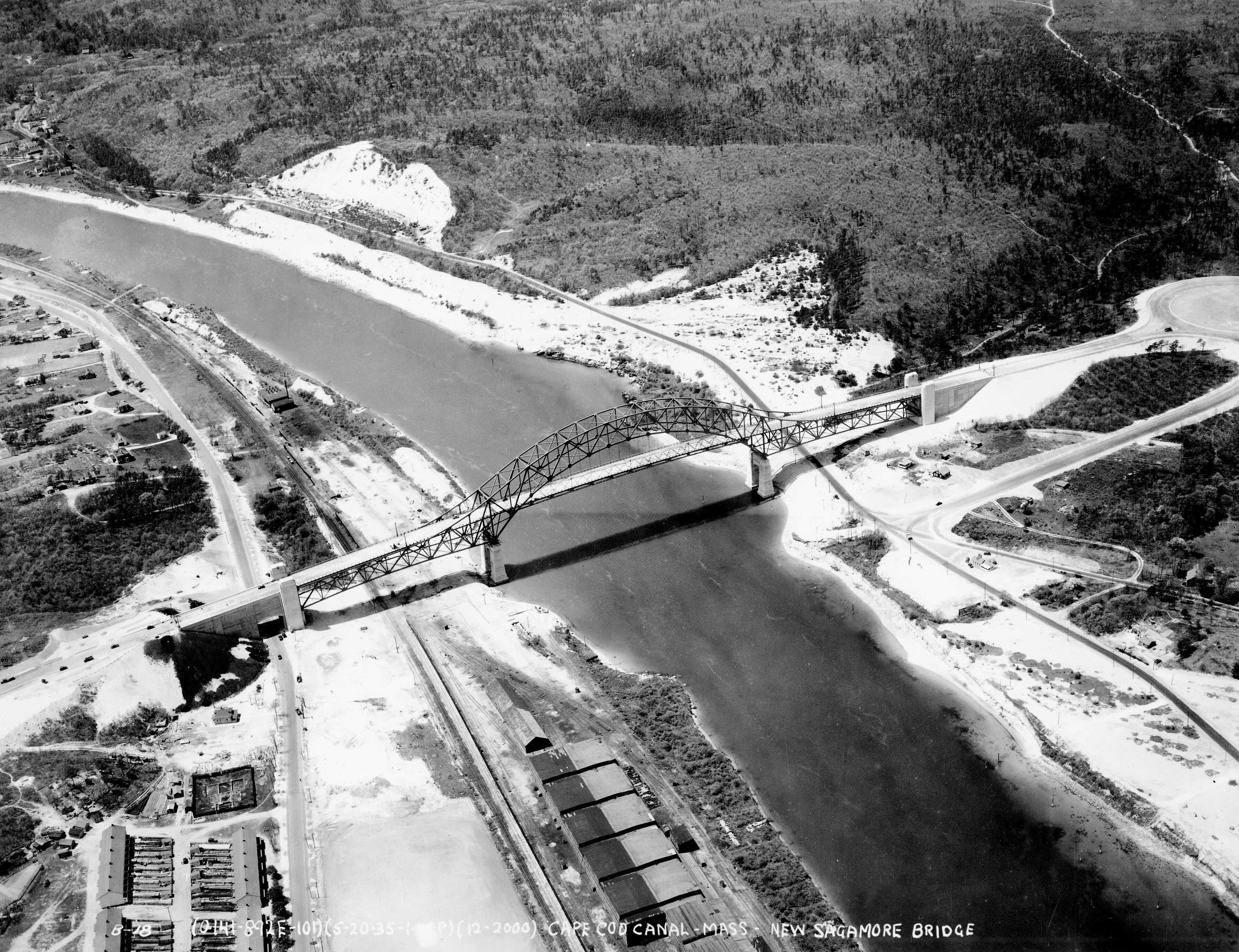
Sagamore Bridge shortly after construction

The bridge and its sibling the Bourne Bridge were constructed beginning in 1933 by the Public Works Administration for the U.S. Army Corps of Engineers, which operates both the bridges and the canal. Both bridges carry four lanes of traffic over a 616 feet (188 m) main span, with a 135 feet (41 m) ship clearance. They opened to traffic on June 22, 1935. The design of the Sagamore and Bourne bridges was later copied in miniature for the John Greenleaf Whittier Bridge that connects I-95 from Newburyport to Amesbury, Massachusetts.

The bridges replaced a drawbridge, the Bourne Highway Bridge, which was built before the canal was widened. The original bridge approaches are still visible to the north of the modern bridge, though both approaches are in low-traffic residential areas.

=== Suicide deterrent fences ===
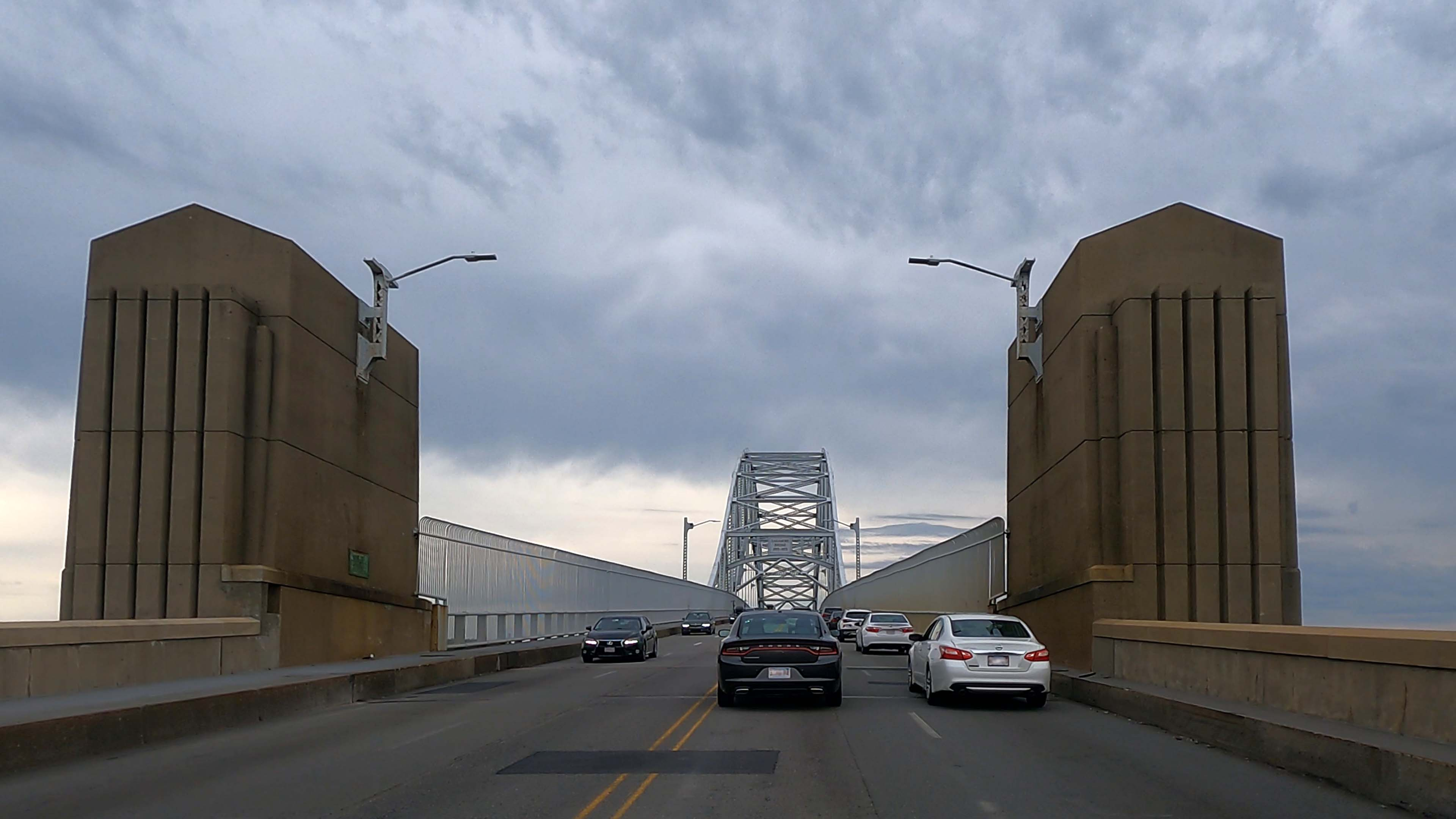
Heading eastbound, with suicide deterrent fences, and a sidewalk along the left side

Between 1967 and 1977, 36 persons were recorded as having died by suicide from the Bourne and Sagamore bridges, and another 24 had attempted but either survived or were apprehended. From 1979 to 1983, as part of "major rehabilitation work," both of the bridges' four-foot high railings were replaced with suicide deterrent fencing. The 12-foot high fencing consists of one-inch round pickets spaced a maximum of six inches apart; the tops of the picket are bent on a seven-inch radius toward the roadway. In the 28-year period after the new fencing was installed (1984–2012), seven persons are known to have died by suicide from the bridges, and between 2013 and 2021, two attempts were prevented. The fencing was cited in 2021 as a possible model for bridges in Rhode Island.

=== Rotary reconstruction ===
In 2004, construction began to replace the rotary that connects Route 6 and Route 3 to the bridge with a trumpet interchange known as the "Sagamore Flyover". This project had been delayed for many years because of a controversy about the disruption of homes and businesses in the area. The project finally commenced because of the severe gridlock at the rotary, which was built to accommodate a much smaller amount of traffic. The flyover was completed in late 2006.

The Army Corps of Engineers replaced the bridge deck, the sidewalk, and the lighting in May 2010. In October 2019, the Army Corps of Engineers recommended replacing the bridge with a wider bridge with four travel lanes, one auxiliary lane in each direction, bike and pedestrian paths, shoulders, and a median. The recommendation said that replacement was more cost-effective than upgrading the existing bridge in order to reduce long summertime backups.

=== Future ===
In 2019, a federal study concluded that the Sagamore and Bourne bridges, originally expected to last only 50 years, needed replacement. The Cape Cod Bridges program is currently taking public input into the multi phased project and have unveiled different design types for feedback.

The Sagamore bridge is slated to be replaced with a new span just to the west of the existing span. Construction could begin in 2027 with an estimated time to completion of 8 to 10 years. The existing bridge will remain open during the construction of new bridge. Unlike the existing bridge, owned by the federal government, the state of Massachusetts will own the new bridge.

== Bicycle/pedestrian access ==
There is a six-foot wide sidewalk for pedestrian and bicycle access on the east side of the bridge. The sidewalk is slightly raised, but there is no fence or barrier between it and car traffic, so cyclists are recommended to walk their bicycle. The bridge road is plowed in winter, although the sidewalk is sometimes unplowed and unpassable. The bridges to the Cape are sometimes closed for safety during high winds.

== See also ==
- List of crossings of the Cape Cod Canal
