= Cape Cod Canal =

Waterway in Massachusetts

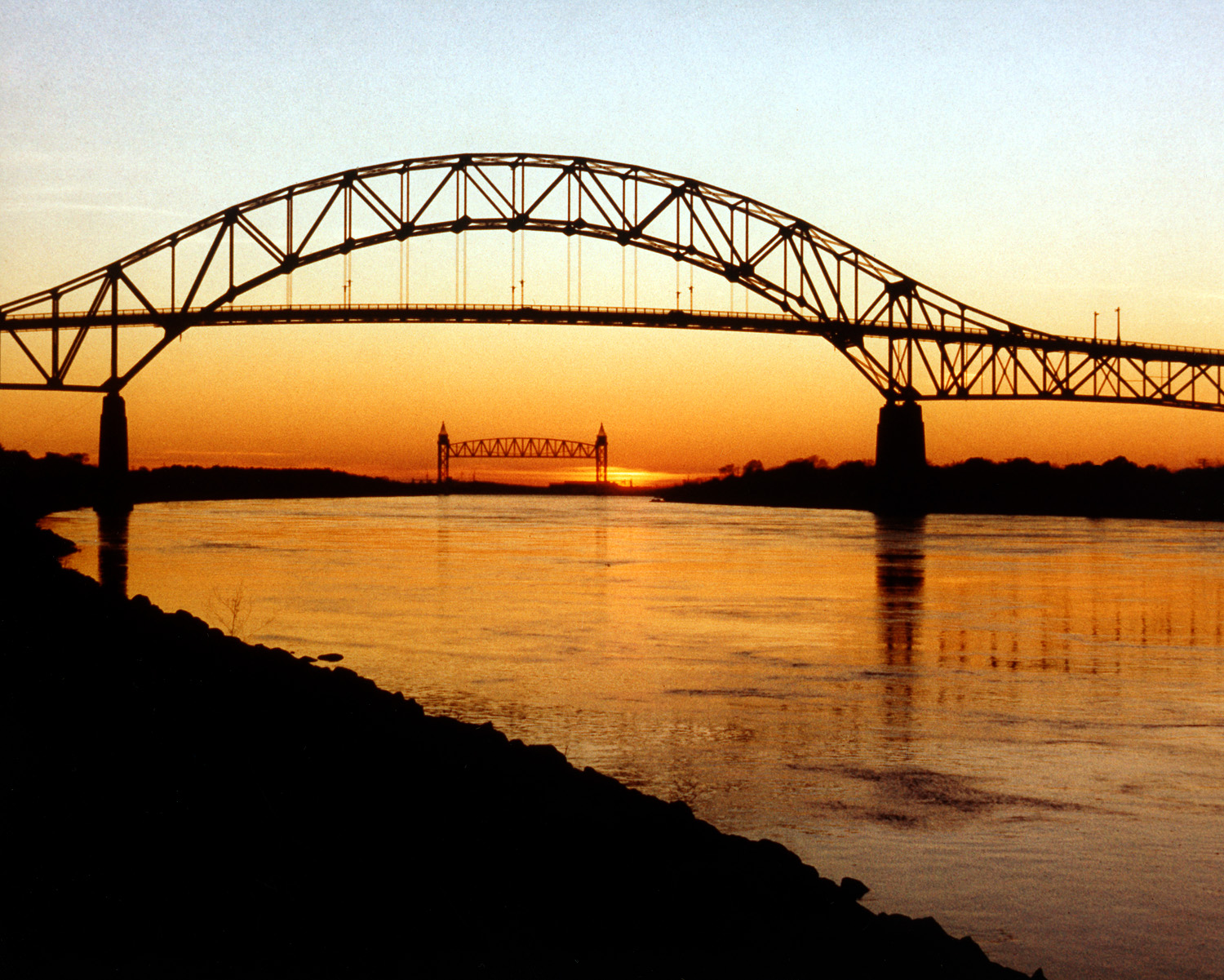
- The Bourne Bridge with the Cape Cod Canal Railroad Bridge in distance

- Location of the Cape Cod Canal
- Location: Barnstable County, Massachusetts
- Country: United States
- Coordinates: 41°45′51″N 70°34′6″W

Specifications
- Length: 7.4 miles (11.9 km)
- Maximum boat length: 825 feet (251 m)
- Maximum boat draft: 32 feet (9.8 m)
- Maximum boat air draft: 135 feet (41 m)
- Locks: None
- Status: Open
- Navigation authority: U.S. Army Corps of Engineers

History
- Original owner: Cape Cod & New York Canal Company
- Principal engineer: William Barclay Parsons
- Construction began: June 22, 1909
- Date of first use: July 29, 1914

Geography
- Start point: Cape Cod Bay
- End point: Buzzards Bay

The Cape Cod Canal is an artificial waterway in Massachusetts connecting Cape Cod Bay in the north to Buzzards Bay in the south, and is part of the Atlantic Intracoastal Waterway. The approximately 7.4-mile-long (11.9 km) canal traverses the neck of land joining Cape Cod to the state's mainland. It mostly follows tidal rivers widened to 480 feet (150 m) and deepened to 32 feet (9.8 m) at mean low water, shaving up to 135 miles (217 km) off the journey around the cape for its approximately 14,000 annual users.

Most of the canal is located in the town of Bourne, but its northeastern terminus is in Sandwich. Scusset Beach State Reservation lies near the canal's east entrance, and the Massachusetts Maritime Academy is near its west. A swift-running current changes direction every six hours and can reach 5.2 miles per hour (8.4 km/h) during the receding ebb tide.

The waterway is maintained by the United States Army Corps of Engineers and has no toll fees. It is spanned by the Cape Cod Canal Railroad Bridge, the Bourne Bridge, and the Sagamore Bridge. Traffic lights at either end govern the approach of vessels over 65 feet (20 m).

The canal is occasionally used by whales and dolphins, including endangered North Atlantic right whales, which can cause closure of the canal.

== History ==
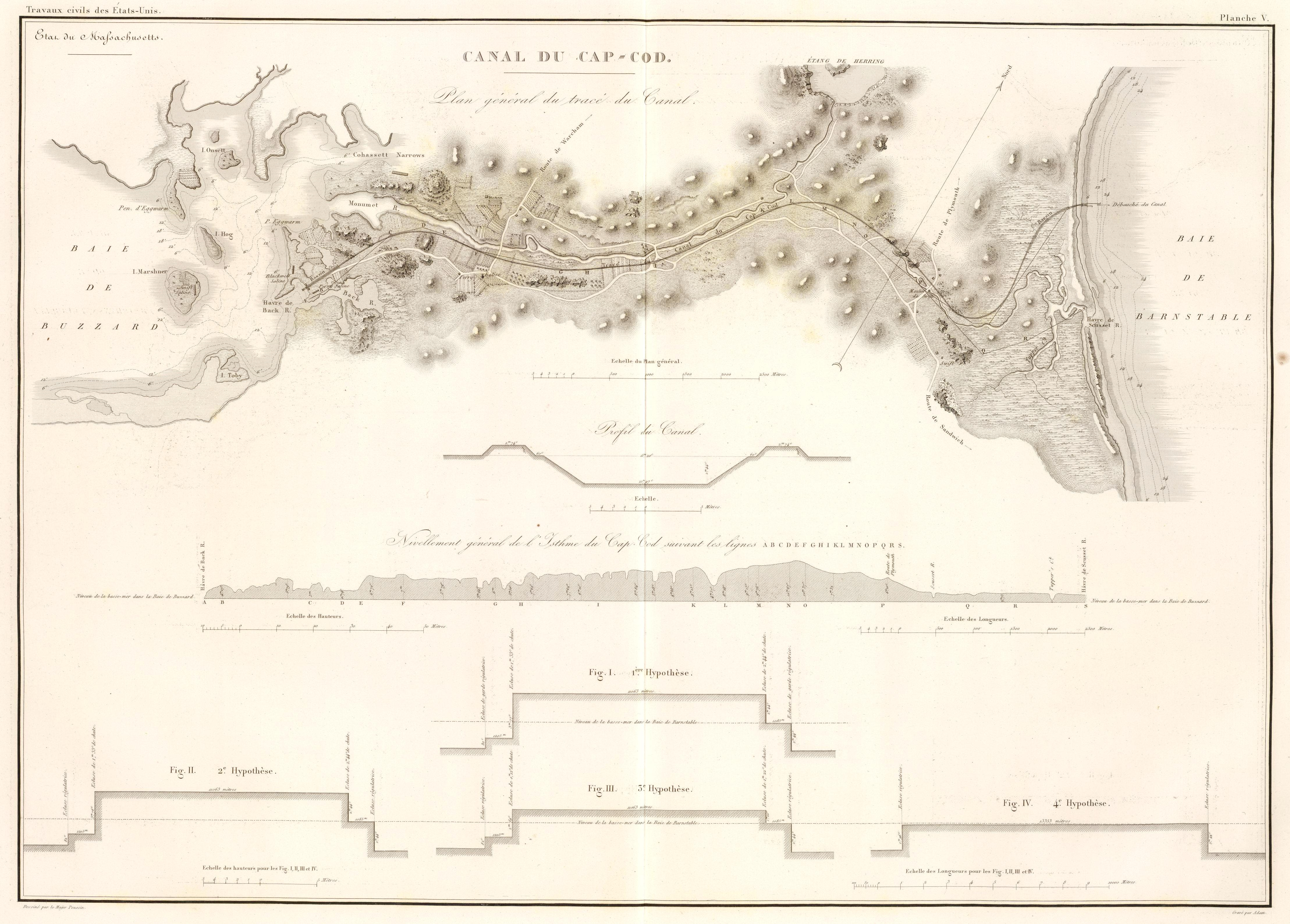
Early plan (1834) that indicates a route different from what was actually constructed (in French)

Construction of a canal was first considered by Myles Standish of the Plymouth Colony in 1623, and the Pilgrims scouted the low-lying stretch of land between the Manomet (Note: Manomet River later became known as Monument River.) and Scusset rivers for potential routes. William Bradford established the Aptucxet Trading Post in 1627 at the portage between the rivers. Trade prospered with the Indians of Narragansett Bay and the Dutch of New Netherland, and this was a major factor enabling the Pilgrims to pay off their debt.

In 1697, the General Court of Massachusetts considered the first formal proposal to build the canal but took no action. In 1717, a canal was created in Orleans, Massachusetts called Jeremiah's Gutter which spanned a narrower portion of the Cape some distance to the east, but it remained active only until the late 1800s. More energetic planning with surveys took place repeatedly in 1776 (commissioned by George Washington), 1791, 1803, 1818, 1824–1830, and 1860. None of these efforts came to fruition.

The first attempts at actually building a canal did not take place until the late 19th century; earlier planners either ran out of money or were overwhelmed by the project's size. The engineers finally decided which route to take through the hillsides by connecting and widening the Manomet and Scusset rivers. The first excavation began in 1880, when the Cape Cod Ship Canal Company hired 400 immigrant Italian laborers to begin digging with shovels and wheelbarrows. The effort ran out of money almost immediately, and the laborers were unpaid and forced to beg for food in Sandwich. In 1883, the Cape Cod Ship Canal Company reorganized under engineer Frederick Lockwood. The company used a bucket dredge to clear nearly a mile of channel through the Sandwich marshes before shutting down in 1891.

=== Private construction ===
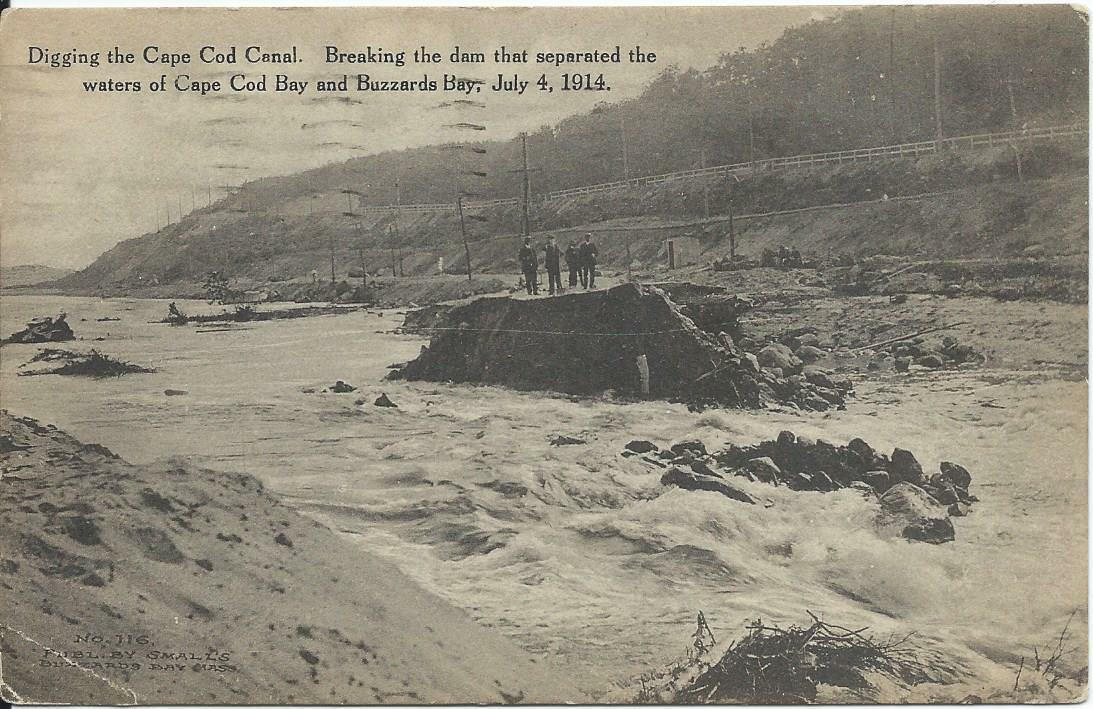
A postcard view of the July 4, 1914, breaking of the dam that separated the two rivers

On June 22, 1909, construction finally began for a working canal under the direction of August Belmont Jr.'s Boston, Cape Cod & New York Canal Company, using designs by engineer William Barclay Parsons. The canal engineers encountered many obstacles, such as large submerged boulders. Divers were hired to blow them up, but the effort slowed dredging. Another problem was cold winter storms which forced the engineers to stop dredging altogether and wait for spring. Nevertheless, the canal opened on a limited basis on July 29, 1914, and it was completed in 1916. The privately owned toll canal had a maximum width of 100 feet (30 m) and a maximum depth of 25 feet (7.6 m), and it took a somewhat difficult route from Phinney Harbor at the head of Buzzards Bay. Several accidents occurred due to the narrow channel and navigation difficulty, and these limited traffic and tarnished the canal's reputation. Toll revenues failed to meet investors' expectations as a result, despite shortening the trade route from New York City to Boston by 62 miles (100 km).

=== Public takeover and expansion ===
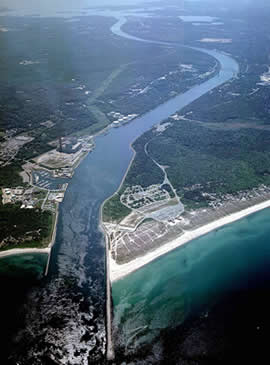
Aerial photo of the Cape Cod Canal looking west with Scusset Beach State Reservation at right

On July 25, 1918, the Director General of the United States Railroad Administration took over jurisdiction and operation of the canal under a presidential proclamation. Four days earlier, the German U-boat U-156 surfaced three miles (5 km) off Orleans, Massachusetts on July 21, 1918, and shelled the tugboat Perth Amboy and her string of four barges. The canal remained under government control until 1920, during which the United States Army Corps of Engineers re-dredged the channel to 25 feet (7.6 m) deep.

In 1928, the government purchased the canal for $11.4 million as a free public waterway, and $21 million was spent between 1935 and 1940 increasing the canal's width to 480 feet (150 m) and its depth to 32 feet (9.8 m). As a result, it became the widest sea-level canal of its time. The southern entrance to the canal was rebuilt for direct access from Buzzards Bay rather than through Phinney Harbor. Before construction began, the Massachusetts Institute of Technology built a huge scale model of the canal (9 feet to a mile, roughly 1/587 actual size) to study the hydraulic effects of tidal currents on the enlarged and rerouted canal.

=== World War II ===
During World War II, shipping again used the canal to avoid U-boats patrolling offshore. It was protected by coastal artillery batteries at the Sagamore Hill Military Reservation at the northern entrance and the Butler Point Military Reservation at the southern entrance. The artillery was never fired in defense of the canal.

The Mystic Steamship Company's collier SS Stephen R. Jones was grounded and sank in the canal on June 28, 1942. Shipping was routed around Cape Cod, and the Liberty ship SS Alexander Macomb was torpedoed by the German submarine U-215 on July 3 with the loss of ten lives. The canal reopened on July 31 after the wrecked Stephen R. Jones was removed with the help of 17 tons of dynamite.

== Recreational uses ==
The canal is used extensively by recreational and commercial vessels. Service roads on both sides of the canal provide access for fishing and are heavily used by in-line skaters, bicyclists, and walkers. Several parking areas are maintained at access points. Bourne Scenic Park is leased by the Corps of Engineers to the Town of Bourne Recreation Authority for use as a tent and RV campground adjacent to the Canal.

The Army Corps of Engineers maintains the Cape Cod Canal Visitor Center which introduces visitors to the history, features, and operation of the canal. Features include a retired 41-foot (12 m) US Army Corps of Engineers patrol boat, a 46-seat theater showing continuous DVD presentations on canal history, canal flora and fauna, real time radar and camera images of the waterway, and a variety of interactive exhibits. Corps Park Rangers staff the center and provide free public programs on a variety of subjects. The Visitor Center is open seasonally from May to October, and admission is free. It is located on Moffitt Drive in Sandwich near the canal's east end. A second seasonally staffed center is at the Herring Run along Scenic Highway.

Scusset Beach State Reservation lies just north of the east end of the canal and offers beach facilities as well as tent and RV camping. A 0.7-mile (1.1 km) trail there leads to Sagamore Hill, once an Indian meeting ground and the site of a World War II coastal fortification. Bournedale Hills Trail extends 1.4 miles (2.3 km) along the north side of the Canal from Bourne Scenic Park campground to the Herring Run. The trail includes a 0.8-mile (1.3 km) self-guided loop which interprets the Canal's historic and natural features.

=== Tunnel folklore and proposal ===
A spoof became popular during the late 20th century concerning a fictitious road tunnel, allegedly built in the 1960s, under the Cape Cod Canal. It came into popular usage in Massachusetts as a commentary on the severe traffic entering and exiting Cape Cod during the summer months. Since 1994, decals have been sold in shops around the Cape as popular souvenirs purporting to be "permits" allowing the bearer to use the tunnel; the popularity of these "permits" briefly led to a lawsuit among several different sellers. In 2019, the Massachusetts Department of Transportation (MassDOT) said that it had studied the idea of adding a tunnel, but had no plans to do so.

== Gallery ==
Cape Cod Canal

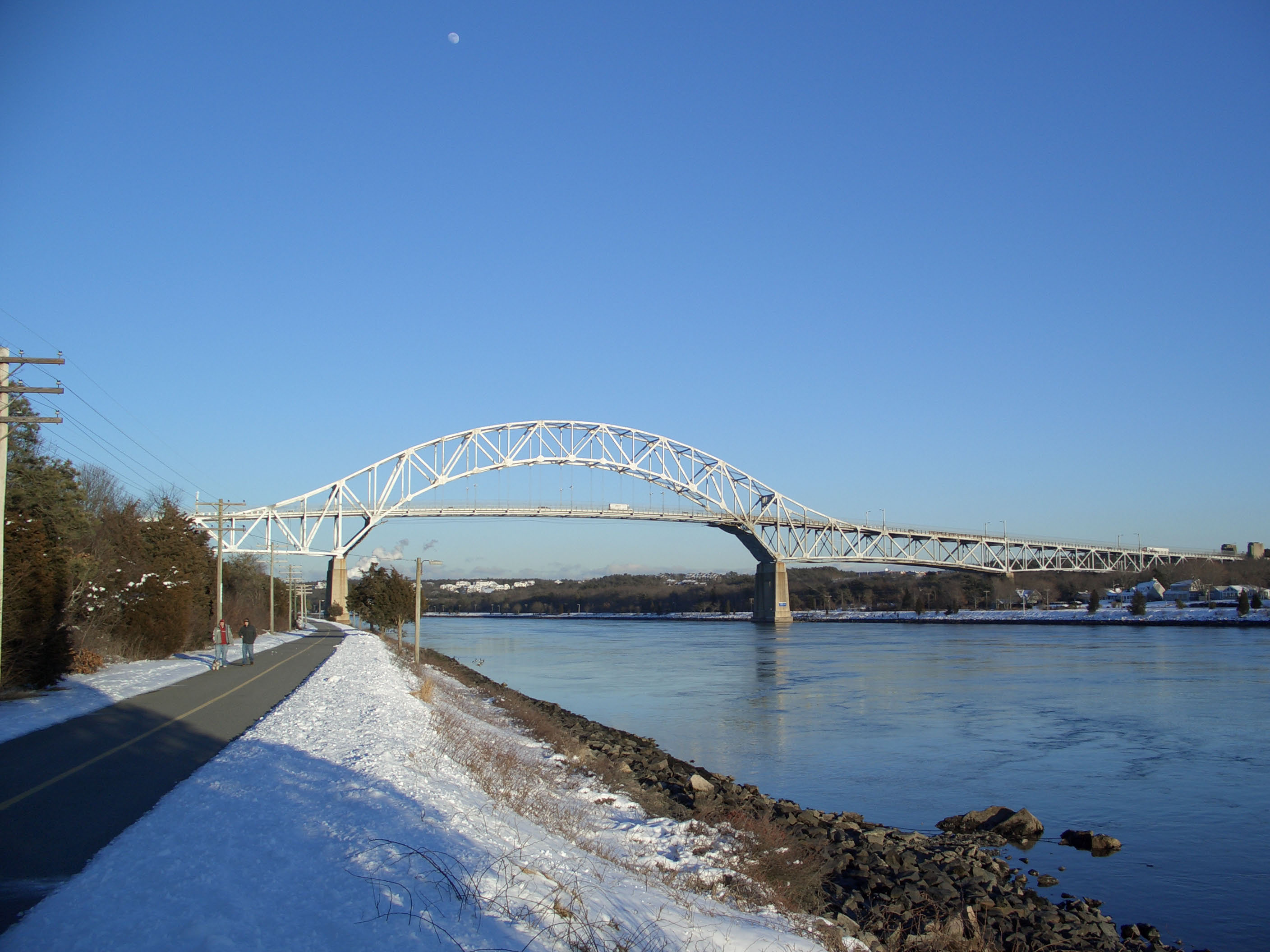
Bourne Bridge

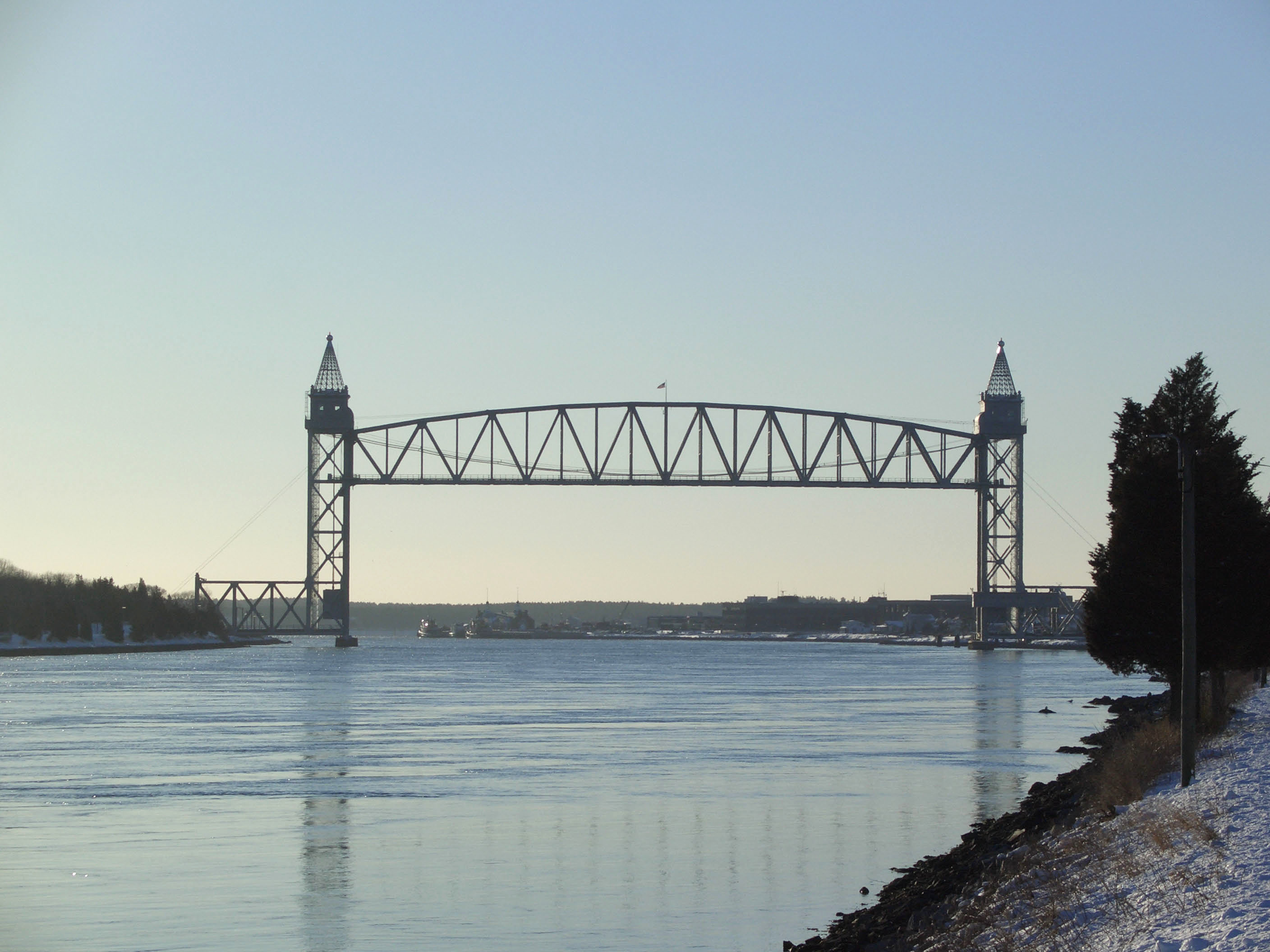
Railroad Bridge

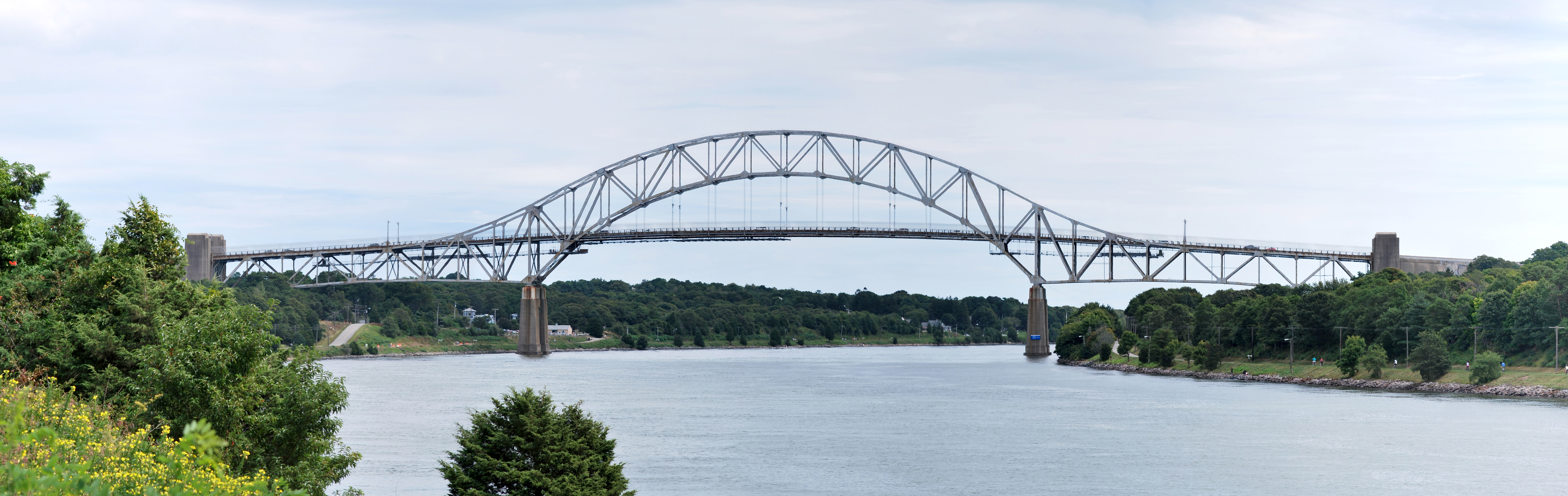
Sagamore Bridge

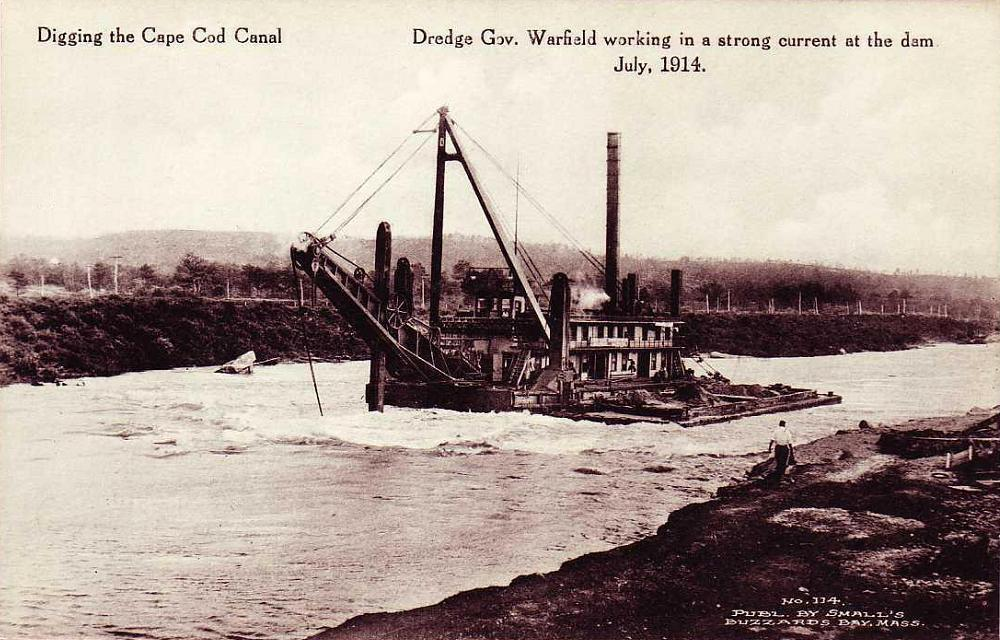
The Gov. Warfield digging the canal in 1914

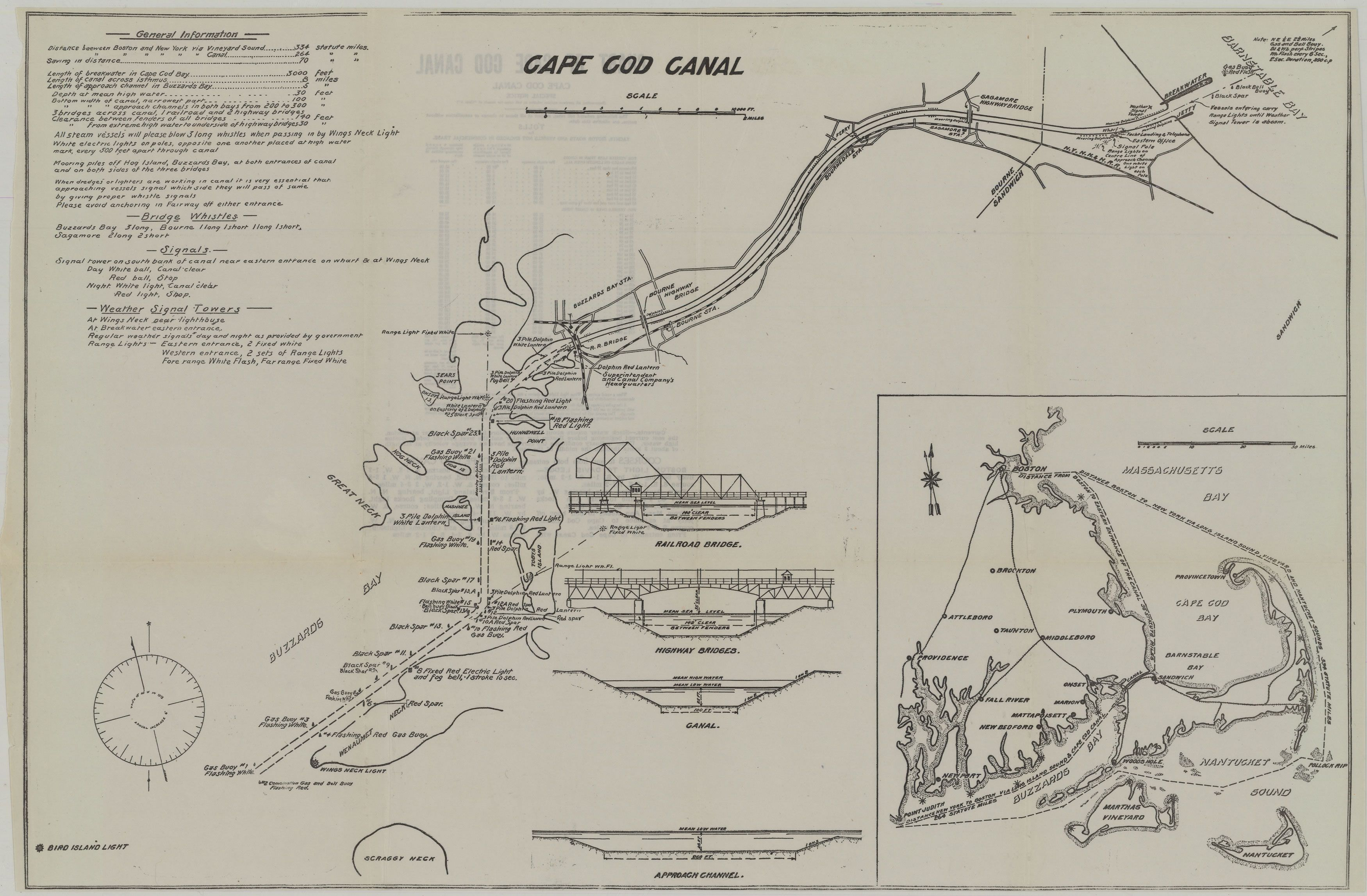
A 1922 map of the Cape Cod Canal, showing bridges, mooring points, and other features

== See also ==
- List of crossings of the Cape Cod Canal
