= Sandwich Road =

Highway in Massachusetts, USA

- Sandwich Road highlighted in purple
- Length: 5.1 mi (8.2 km)
- Component highways: Route 6A
- Location: Barnstable County
- West end: Trowbridge Road in Bourne
- East end: Cranberry Highway in Sandwich

Sandwich Road is a two-lane state highway in Bourne, Massachusetts, United States, traveling from Bourne center east to Sandwich. It begins at a four-way intersection with Shore Road, County Road, and Trowbridge Road in Bourne center; Waterhouse Road and Perry Avenue (the latter the former approach to the old Bourne Bridge) also once ended there. It heads east along the south side of the Cape Cod Canal, traveling under both the Bourne Bridge and the Sagamore Bridge. A short connection, also called Sandwich Road, connects the Bourne Rotary – the south end of the Bourne Bridge – with the main road. From the area of the Sagamore Bridge, at Sagamore, east to the Sandwich town line, Sandwich Road carries Route 6A.

Sandwich Road once carried both directions of Route 3, which ended at the Bourne Rotary. Later, Route 3 was truncated to the Sagamore Rotary, and US 6 became a one-way pair at the canal – eastbound on the north side and westbound on the south side (Sandwich Road). The opposite directions were signed as US 6 Byp. Eventually both directions of US 6 were moved to the north side of the canal, and Sandwich Road became an unnumbered state highway. Despite this, a small number of US 6 shields still remain on Sandwich Road, several signs in the area still identify the road as US 6, and many residents of the area still refer to it as "Route 6."

== Major intersections ==
The entire route is in Barnstable County.

Location	mi	km	Destinations	Notes
Bourne	0.0	0.0	Trowbridge Road / Shore Road – Boston, Providence, RI	To Bourne Bridge
Bourne	0.5	0.80	Veterans Way to Route 28 north / US 6 – Boston, Providence, RI	To Bourne Bridge
Bourne	0.9	1.4	To Route 28 / US 6 – Buzzards Bay, Providence, RI	To Bourne Bridge
Bourne	3.7	6.0	To US 6 east – Hyannis, Provincetown	Via Mid-Cape Connector; southern terminus of Route 6A
Sagamore	4.7	7.6	Cranberry Highway – Boston, Providence, RI	To Sagamore Bridge
Sagamore	5.1	8.2	Route 6A east (Old King's Highway)	Sandwich town line
1.000 mi = 1.609 km; 1.000 km = 0.621 mi: Route transition
