= Bassetts Island =

Island in Bourne, Massachusetts, United States

Coordinates: 41°40′50″N 70°38′07″W

Bassetts Island is a Y-shaped island within Pocasset Harbor and Red Brook Harbor, in Bourne, Massachusetts, United States.

It is located between two peninsulas, Wings Neck to the north and Scraggy Neck to the south, and is geographically separated into four portions, the central, northeast, southeast, and the western. The island is approximately 60 acres (24 ha) of woodland, marshland and beach.

The island is inhabited year round with one house on the western portion and five houses on the northeastern portion. There are no roads on the island, with the exception of a minor path that runs through the northern and western parts of the island. The island can only be accessed via boat, and there are no utility services.

There are two channels, one to the north and one to the south side. The north channel provides access to Pocassett Harbor and the Barlow's Landing boat ramp. The south channel provides access to Red Brook Harbor, Kingman Yacht Club, Parker's Boat Yard, Hen Cove and the Hen Cove boat ramp, Hospital Cove and the Red Brook Herring Run. The south channel is shallow and tight on account of to a large sand bar that extends from the southern tip of the island.

The western side of the southern tip provides great boat-accessible swimming and a sandy beach. In contrast, the eastern side of the southern tip has a rocky beach. Anchorage can be found on the north, east and west sides of the island, but the westerly anchorage is not as protected as the other two. During the summer months, the easterly side of the island is a favorite among locals.

The island's history dates back to the mid-1600s, when it was owned by William Numuck, a Wampanoag who also owned most of Pocasset and Cataumet, stretching from the Pocasset River to the Falmouth town line and also including Numuck's Island (Auntchishogquechike Island).

== Location ==
The island is southeast of Wings Neck, west of Patuisset (neighborhood) & Handy Point, northwest of Long Point, and northeast of Scraggy Neck & the Anchorage.

== Portions ==
=== Central ===
The central portion of the island is the most forested area on the island. Also, there are two small salt ponds on the central portion which connect with Red Brook Harbor.

=== Northeast ===
The northeast portion of the island is moderately forested. There is a small inland pond. Also, there are several residential buildings spread out along the northeast portion.

=== Southeast ===
The southeast portion is the least forested portion of the island. Half of the portion is marshy, but the southeast portion has the sandiest coastline on the island. There are no buildings or other man-made structures on this portion of the island.

=== West ===
The western portion, the widest and shortest arm of the island, is sparsely forested. There is some marshy land on the eastern side, extending towards the center of the arm. On the western side are several buildings, a tennis court, and a pier.
