= Bourne Town Hall =

Bourne Town Hall may refer to:

- Bourne Town Hall, Lincolnshire
- Bourne Town Hall, Massachusetts
