= Scraggy Neck =

Peninsula

Coordinates: 41°39′58″N 70°38′36″W

Scraggy Neck is a peninsula in Buzzards Bay south of the Cape Cod Canal, in Cataumet, Massachusetts, United States. It is south of Wings Neck and southeast of Bassetts Island.

As with all land in the area, the ancestral people on and around Scraggy Neck were Wampanoag. In 1637, through means that are not entirely clear, Thomas Dexter acquired the land that is now Scraggy Neck from the Wampanoag. Around 1667, he transferred the land to the Town of Sandwich and it became "parsonage property" of the First Church.

On 9 February 1847 the "First Parish in Sandwich County of Barnstable" transferred title to Martin Ellis for $1,350.

In 1866, Ellis offered the property for sale, advertising in the Yarmouth Register "Scraggy Neck for Sale." The ad copy declared "The estate lying in Pocasset (Sandwich)... consisting of 384 acres, principally woodland, cut off in 1846, but with pasture for cattle and sheep, and unrivalled privileges for shell and other fisheries. There are on the premises a dwelling house for a small family, a good barn, and other out-buildings. Also, a thrifty young orchard of apple, pear and quince trees. Making this a very desirable place for farming, sheep raising, or shore fishing. The present proprietor is obliged to give it up on account of ill health. Price $2,000. For further particulars apply to JOSHUA HANDY, near the premises. MARTIN ELLIS"

On 3 March 1870, Joshua Handy, on behalf of Ellis, sold the land for $1,000 to Charles W. Parker and George P. Ellis. They subsequently, on 13 May 1870, sold to Washington Allen for $1,600.

On 21 April 1892, through a series of transactions between Allen, Francis H. Learned, and Edith H. Eustis, William Ellery Channing ("W.E.C.") Eustis "bought the entire three-hundred-acre, flounder-shaped peninsula" and began developing property on the neck. The total purchase price of the land seems to have been $50,000.

In 1937, Edward C. Johnson II and his wife Elsie L. Johnson bought a house on the neck and began a long family association with the area. In 1940, The Johnson and Eustis families converted the central 75 acres of the island to a protected forest.

Current residents of the neck are members of the Scraggy Neck Recreation Association
