= Buzzards Bay, Massachusetts =

- Census-designated place
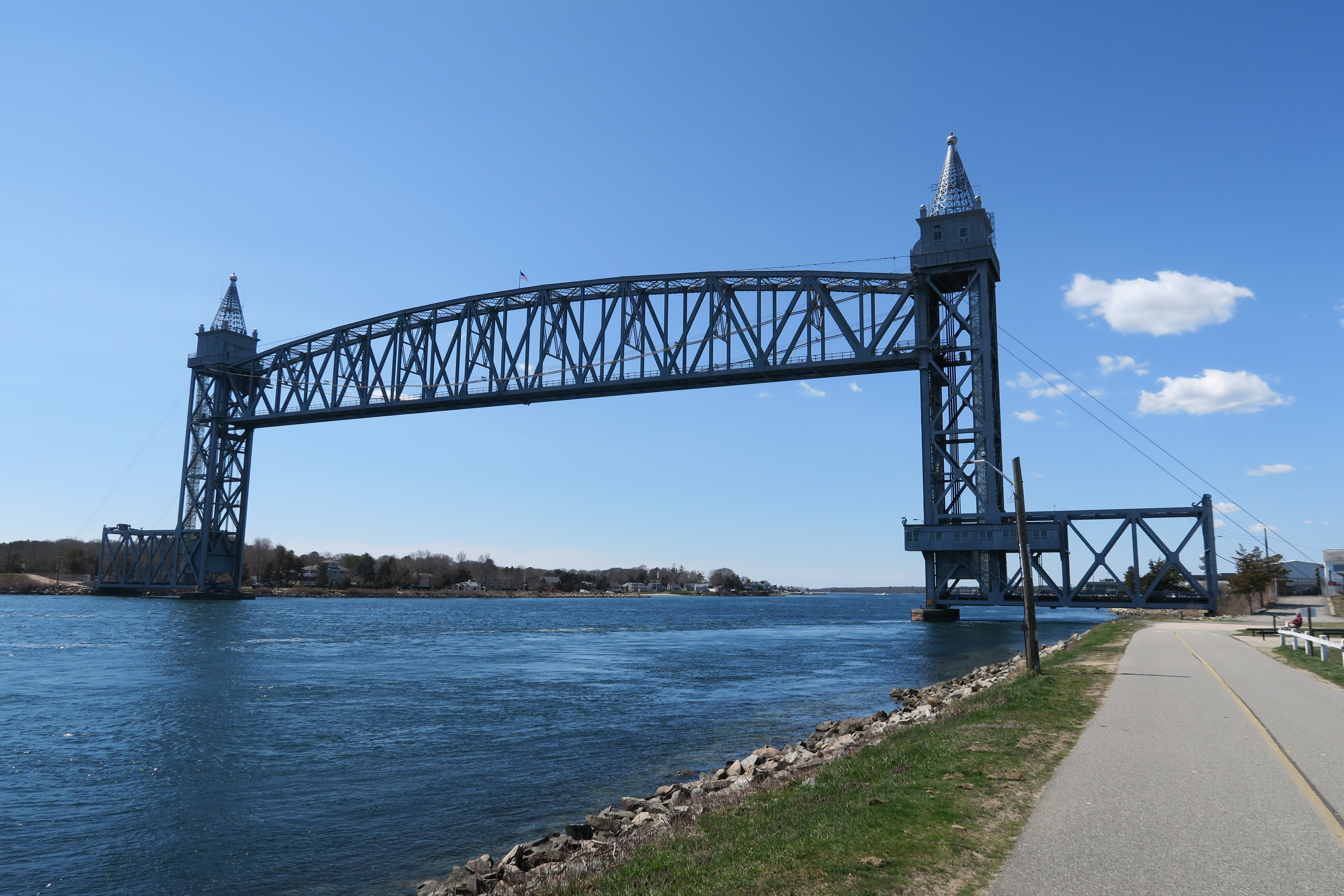
- Buzzards Bay Railroad Bridge

- Location in Barnstable County and the state of Massachusetts.
- Coordinates: 41°45′5″N 70°36′49″W
- Country: United States
- State: Massachusetts
- County: Barnstable
- Town: Bourne
- Settled: 1621

Area
  - Total: 2.96 sq mi (7.66 km^{2})
  - Land: 1.92 sq mi (4.96 km^{2})
  - Water: 1.04 sq mi (2.70 km^{2})
- Elevation: 9.8 ft (3 m)

Population (2020)
  - Total: 4,279
  - Density: 2,233.7/sq mi (862.43/km^{2})
- Time zone: UTC-5 (Eastern (EST))
  - Summer (DST): UTC-4 (EDT)
- ZIP Code: 02532
- Area code: 508
- FIPS code: 25-10015
- GNIS feature ID: 0616369

Buzzards Bay is a census-designated place (CDP) in the town of Bourne in Barnstable County, Massachusetts, United States. As of the 2020 census, Buzzards Bay had a population of 4,279. It is the most populous of the five CDPs in Bourne.

== Geography ==
Buzzards Bay is located at 41°45′5″N 70°36′49″W (41.751364, -70.613563). Along with Bournedale and Sagamore Beach, it is one of three communities in Barnstable County located on the mainland side of the Cape Cod Canal. Excessively drained sand underlies most of the community and the majority is mapped as Carver soil series.

According to the United States Census Bureau, the CDP has a total area of 2.9 square miles (7.6 km^{2}), of which 1.9 square miles (5.0 km^{2}) is land and 1.0 square mile (2.6 km^{2}) (34.75%) is water, consisting primarily of Buttermilk Bay, an arm of Buzzards Bay forming the western edge of the CDP.

== Demographics ==
Historical population
Census	Pop.	Note	%±
2020	4,279		—
U.S. Decennial Census

=== 2020 census ===
As of the 2020 census, Buzzards Bay had a population of 4,279. The median age was 31.8 years. 10.0% of residents were under the age of 18 and 19.3% of residents were 65 years of age or older. For every 100 females there were 149.8 males, and for every 100 females age 18 and over there were 155.6 males age 18 and over.

98.5% of residents lived in urban areas, while 1.5% lived in rural areas.

There were 1,383 households in Buzzards Bay, of which 18.2% had children under the age of 18 living in them. Of all households, 40.0% were married-couple households, 20.0% were households with a male householder and no spouse or partner present, and 31.7% were households with a female householder and no spouse or partner present. About 34.2% of all households were made up of individuals and 18.6% had someone living alone who was 65 years of age or older.

There were 1,748 housing units, of which 20.9% were vacant. The homeowner vacancy rate was 1.3% and the rental vacancy rate was 3.1%.

Racial composition as of the 2020 census
Race	Number	Percent
White	3,877	90.6%
Black or African American	63	1.5%
American Indian and Alaska Native	22	0.5%
Asian	42	1.0%
Native Hawaiian and Other Pacific Islander	3	0.1%
Some other race	64	1.5%
Two or more races	208	4.9%
Hispanic or Latino (of any race)	130	3.0%

=== 2000 census ===
As of the 2000 census, there were 3,549 people, 1,216 households, and 795 families residing in the CDP. The population density was 692.1 per km^{2} (1,793.4 per mi^{2}). There were 1,572 housing units at an average density of 306.5 per km^{2} (794.4 per mi^{2}). The racial makeup of the CDP was 98.49% White, 0.01% African American, 0.54% Native American, 0.90% Asian, 0.99% from other races, and 0.07% from two or more races. Hispanic or Latino of any race were 0.04% of the population.

There were 1,216 households, out of which 24.2% had children under the age of 18 living with them, 48.3% were married couples living together, 12.7% had a female householder with no husband present, and 34.6% were non-families. 29.1% of all households were made up of individuals, and 12.2% had someone living alone who was 65 years of age or older. The average household size was 2.29 and the average family size was 2.78.

In the CDP, the population was spread out, with 15.9% under the age of 18, 23.0% from 18 to 24, 23.5% from 25 to 44, 20.7% from 45 to 64, and 17.0% who were 65 years of age or older. The median age was 35 years. For every 100 females, there were 121.7 males. For every 100 females age 18 and over, there were 123.5 males.

The median income for a household in the CDP was $99,750, and the median income for a family was $142,165. Males had a median income of $98,702 versus $68,801 for females. The per capita income for the CDPwas $88,304. About 0.4% of families and 1.7% of the population were below the poverty line, including 0.5% of those under age 18 and 1.2% of those age 65 or over.

== History ==
Buzzards Bay was originally Wampanoag territory. The "buzzards" for which the town was named were most likely turkey vultures or ospreys. Buzzards Bay was settled by Europeans in 1621.

Among the community's most prominent residents was President Grover Cleveland, who maintained a "Summer White House" at his home at Agawam Point in Buzzards Bay. Cleveland's home, a local landmark, was destroyed by fire on December 10, 1973.

== Culture ==
Buzzards Bay is home to the National Marine Life Center, a marine animal hospital, science, and education center dedicated to rehabilitating for release stranded sea turtles, and seals to advance scientific knowledge and education in marine wildlife health and conservation. Buzzards Bay is also home to the Massachusetts Maritime Academy.

== Education ==
Bourne Public Schools is the local public school district; it operates Bourne High School.

Area Catholic schools of the Roman Catholic Diocese of Fall River include: St. Francis Xavier School in Acushnet, St. Joseph School in Fairhaven, and St. Pius X School in South Yarmouth. Previously Buzzards Bay had its own Catholic grade school, St. Margaret Primary School, which closed in 2020 in the wake of the COVID-19 pandemic. St. Francis Xavier, St. Joseph, and St. Pius X took former St. Margaret students.

== See also ==
- Buzzards Bay Entrance Light, located at the mouth of the eponymous bay
- Buzzards Bay Train Station
