= Wing's Neck Light =

- U.S. National Register of Historic Places
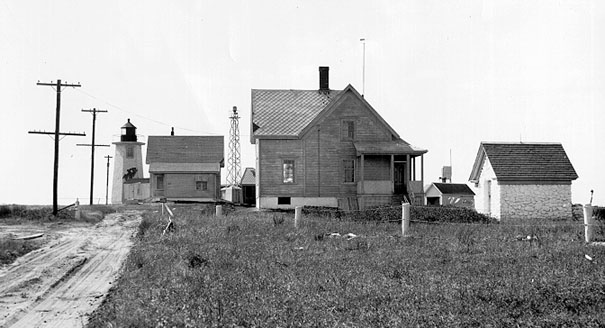
- Light and related buildings

- Location within Cape Cod
- Location: Pocasset, Massachusetts
- Coordinates: 41°40′56″N 70°39′37″W
- Built: 1849; 177 years ago
- MPS: Lighthouses of Massachusetts TR
- NRHP reference No.: 87001503
- Added to NRHP: June 15, 1987

The Wing's Neck Light is a historic lighthouse in the Pocasset village of Bourne, Massachusetts. It is located on Wing's Neck Road at the end of Wing's Neck, a peninsula between Pocasset Harbor and the Hog Island Channel, which provides access to the Cape Cod Canal. The first lighthouse was built in the site in 1849; it was a stone keeper's house with a wood-frame tower above, and was destroyed by fire in 1878.

The present lighthouse and keeper's house were built in 1889; it is the only extant wood-frame light and keeper's house connected by a covered way from that period.

The lighthouse was listed on the National Register of Historic Places in 1987.

== See also ==
- National Register of Historic Places listings in Barnstable County, Massachusetts
