= Bourne Stone =

Archaeological artifact in Massachusetts, US

Coordinates: 41°44′36.0″N 70°35′48.7″W

The Bourne Stone is an archaeological curiosity located in the town of Bourne, Massachusetts. The stone is a 300-pound (140 kg) chunk of granite, upon which two lines of carvings were made.

== History ==
The Bourne Historical Society has written that the stone probably started as a doorstep of a Native American meeting house around 1680, then passed through several owners, landing at the Aptucxet Trading Post in Bourne about 1930. The stone has been displayed at the historical center since 2003.

In 2004, Larry J. Zimmerman explained his own theory about the Bourne Stone in Collaboration In Archaeological Practice: Engaging Descendant Communities. He invited Norse runic expert Michael Barnes to examine the stone. Barnes stated that the markings were definitely not runic. Zimmerman and Patricia Emerson, Minnesota archaeologist, suggested that the markings looked like Native American petroglyphs.

In 2016, Plymouth Archaeological Rediscovery Project member archaeologist Craig Chartier upon closer examination and looking at a stone rubbing as well as the stone itself came to the conclusion that it was "potentially one of the most important late Prehistoric to Contact Period artifacts ever identified in New England" and was created by the "Native people of the Manomet/Herring Pond community."
