= Pocasset, Massachusetts =

- Census-designated place
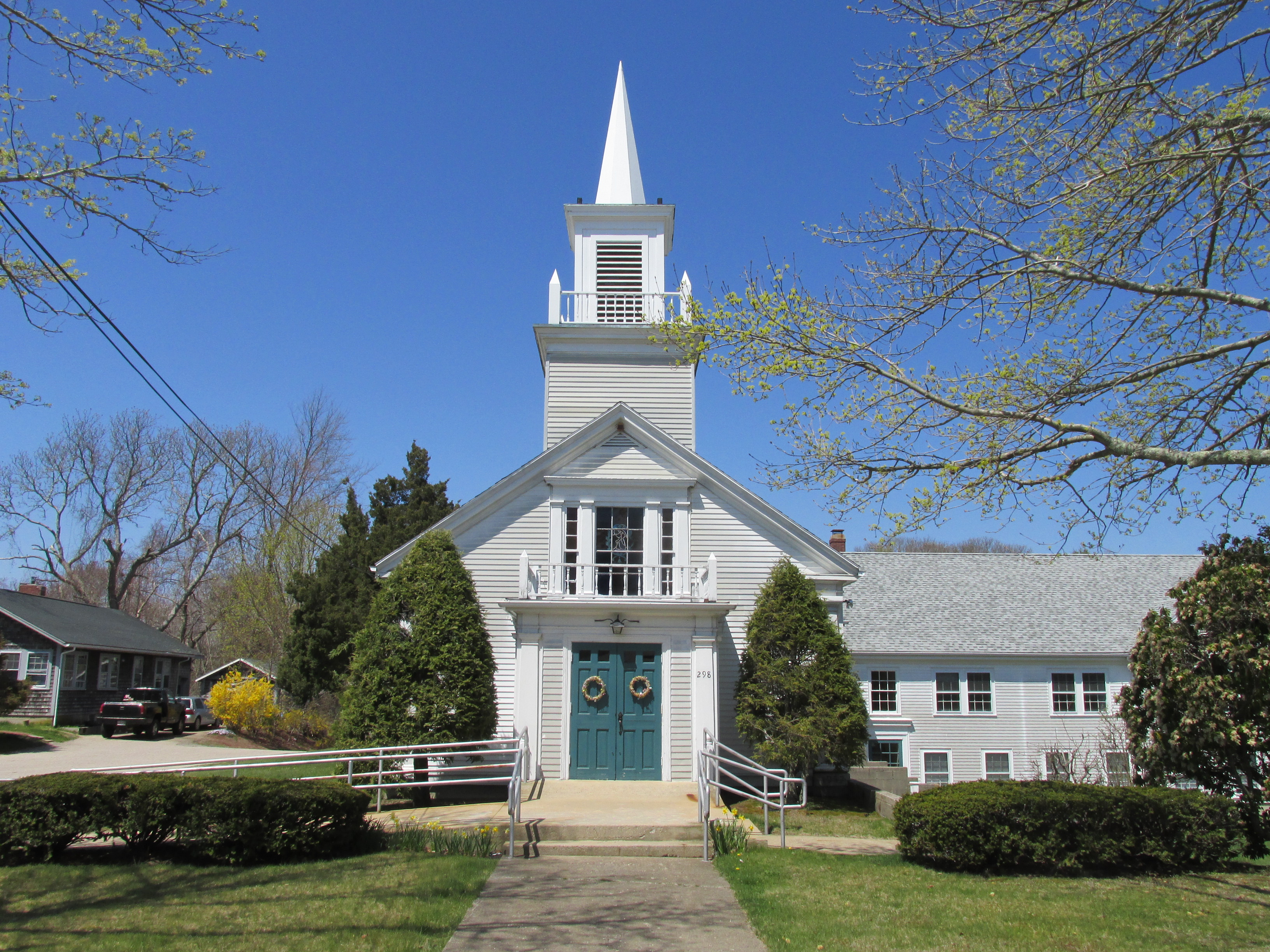
- First Baptist Church

- Location in Barnstable County and the state of Massachusetts.
- Coordinates: 41°41′27″N 70°37′0″W
- Country: United States
- State: Massachusetts
- County: Barnstable
- Town: Bourne

Area
  - Total: 9.80 sq mi (25.38 km^{2})
  - Land: 3.70 sq mi (9.58 km^{2})
  - Water: 6.10 sq mi (15.81 km^{2})
- Elevation: 33 ft (10 m)

Population (2020)
  - Total: 2,843
  - Density: 769/sq mi (296.9/km^{2})
- Time zone: UTC-5 (Eastern (EST))
  - Summer (DST): UTC-4 (EDT)
- ZIP code: 02559
- Area code: 508
- FIPS code: 25-54450
- GNIS feature ID: 0616446

The village of Pocasset is a census-designated place (CDP) in the town of Bourne in Barnstable County, Massachusetts, United States, located on Buzzards Bay. As of the 2020 census, Pocasset had a population of 2,843.

== Geography ==
Pocasset is located in the southwestern part of the town of Bourne. It is bordered to the north by the villages of Bourne and Monument Beach, to the east by Route 28; to the south by the village of Cataumet and Red Brook Pond and Red Brook Harbor; and to the west by the northern end of Buzzards Bay.

According to the United States Census Bureau, the CDP has a total area of 9.8 square miles (25.3 km^{2}), of which 3.7 square miles (9.5 km^{2}) is land, and 6.1 square miles (15.8 km^{2}) (62.42%) is water.

== Name ==
The name derives from the Pocasset Wampanoag and evolved over time: "Returning from this excursion in the direction of Wareham, and retracing our steps through the entire length of Monument westward and southward, we come to the ancient 2d Precinct of Sandwich, called by the early Indians Pouglikeeste — at a later period Pokesit and now called Pocasset."

== Demographics ==
Historical population
Census	Pop.	Note	%±
2020	2,843		—
U.S. Decennial Census

=== 2020 census ===
As of the 2020 census, Pocasset had a population of 2,843. The median age was 60.2 years. 11.2% of residents were under the age of 18 and 40.2% of residents were 65 years of age or older. For every 100 females there were 93.0 males, and for every 100 females age 18 and over there were 91.4 males age 18 and over.

100.0% of residents lived in urban areas, while 0.0% lived in rural areas.

There were 1,446 households in Pocasset, of which 12.9% had children under the age of 18 living in them. Of all households, 43.0% were married-couple households, 19.7% were households with a male householder and no spouse or partner present, and 30.1% were households with a female householder and no spouse or partner present. About 37.5% of all households were made up of individuals and 24.7% had someone living alone who was 65 years of age or older.

There were 2,382 housing units, of which 39.3% were vacant. The homeowner vacancy rate was 0.9% and the rental vacancy rate was 6.2%.

Racial composition as of the 2020 census
Race	Number	Percent
White	2,586	91.0%
Black or African American	28	1.0%
American Indian and Alaska Native	37	1.3%
Asian	25	0.9%
Native Hawaiian and Other Pacific Islander	0	0.0%
Some other race	33	1.2%
Two or more races	134	4.7%
Hispanic or Latino (of any race)	50	1.8%

=== 2000 census ===
As of the census of 2000, there were 2,671 people, 1,277 households, and 753 families residing in the CDP. The population density was 275.0/km^{2} (712.8/mi^{2}). There were 2,038 housing units at an average density of 209.8/km^{2} (543.9/mi^{2}). The racial makeup of the CDP was 96.26% White, 1.27% African American, 0.52% Native American, 0.26% Asian, 0.52% from other races, and 1.16% from two or more races. Hispanic or Latino of any race were 0.37% of the population.

There were 1,277 households, out of which 17.0% had children under the age of 18 living with them, 49.4% were married couples living together, 6.5% had a female householder with no husband present, and 41.0% were non-families. 35.2% of all households were made up of individuals, and 18.4% had someone living alone who was 65 years of age or older. The average household size was 2.09 and the average family size was 2.70.

In the CDP, the population was spread out, with 16.1% under the age of 18, 4.9% from 18 to 24, 20.5% from 25 to 44, 30.4% from 45 to 64, and 28.0% who were 65 years of age or older. The median age was 50 years. For every 100 females, there were 92.0 males. For every 100 females age 18 and over, there were 89.2 males.

The median income for a household in the CDP was $97,523, and the median income for a family was $162,596. Males had a median income of $103,889 versus $71,971 for females. The per capita income for the CDP was $106,866. About 0.7% of families and 1.8% of the population were below the poverty line, including 0.9% of those under age 18 and 0.2% of those age 65 or over.

== Drinking water ==
In May 2016, three homes in a Pocasset neighborhood received bottled water, because of elevated perfluorinated organic compounds in drinking water, linked to firefighting foam used after military fuel truck crashes at Otis Rotary, which connects to nearby Otis Air National Guard Base.

== Landmarks ==
Wing's Neck Light is a Cape Cod-style lighthouse built in 1849, with a white, wooden hexagonal tower and lantern room on top of a stone house where the keeper lived.
