= Bourne Town Hall (Massachusetts) =

- U.S. National Register of Historic Places
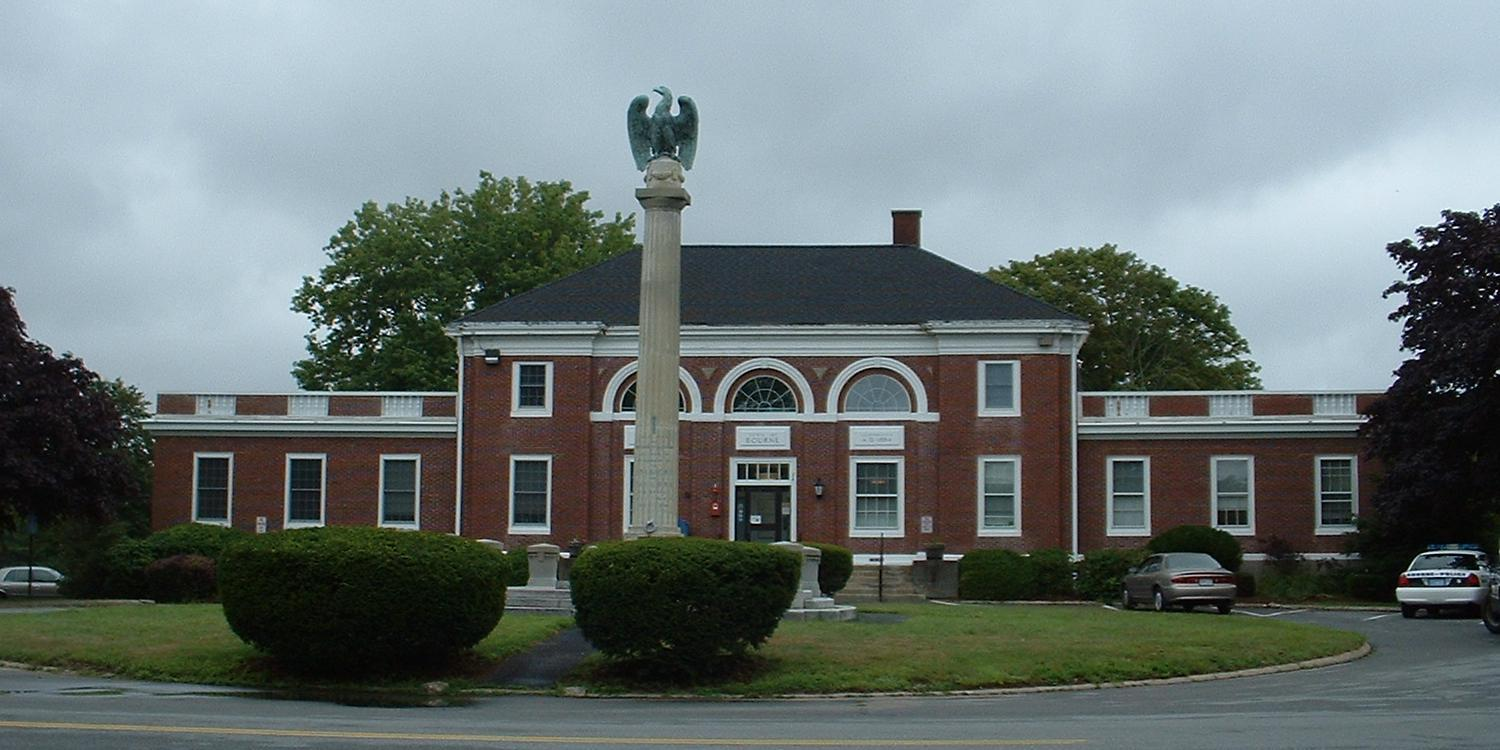

- Location within Cape Cod Location within Massachusetts Location within the United States
- Location: Bourne, Massachusetts
- Coordinates: 41°44′53″N 70°36′6″W
- Area: 4.09 acres (1.66 ha)
- Built: 1914
- Architect: James Purdon
- Architectural style: Classical Revival
- NRHP reference No.: 12001169
- Added to NRHP: January 14, 2013

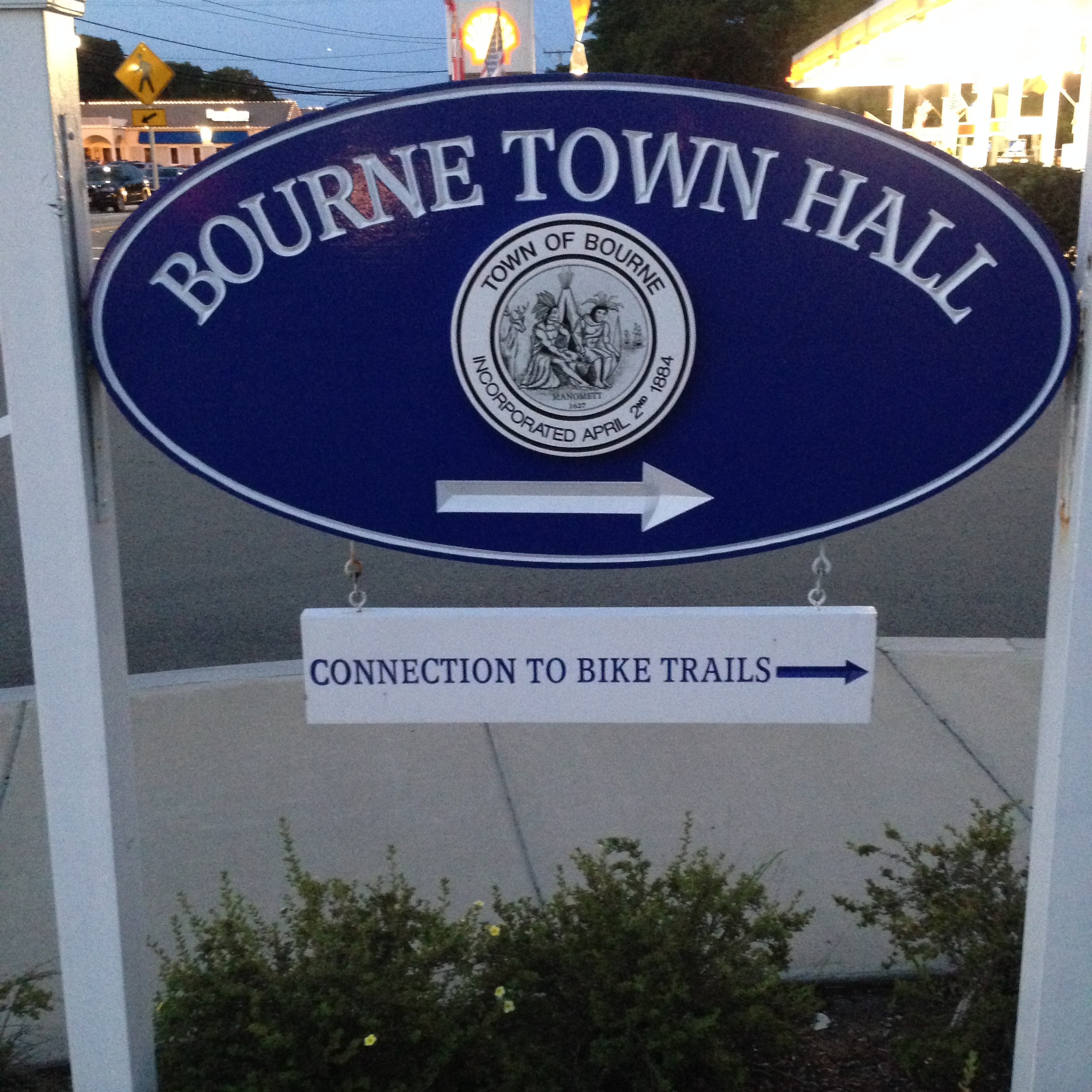
Town Hall sign

Bourne Town Hall is the town hall of Bourne, Massachusetts. It is located at 24 Perry Road in the Buzzards Bay section of the town. The two story Classical Revival brick building was built in 1914 to a design by architect James Purdon, and is the town's first and only purpose-built town hall. It was listed on the National Register of Historic Places in 2013.

== Description and history ==
The town of Bourne is divided into two sections by the Cape Cod Canal. Its town hall stands on the east side of Perry Avenue, a spur road running south from Main Street to the canal. It is set back from the street, behind a circular green surrounded by a drive with parking. At the center of the green is the 1914 Soldiers and Sailors Memorial, built to commemorate the town's military participants in the American Civil War.

The town hall consists of a two-story main block, which is flanked on either side by single story wings, and in the rear by a projecting two story ell. The flanking wings are the result of a 1937 addition, and the rear ell, originally one story, was raised to two in the 1970s. The facade of the main block is five bays wide, with a center entrance. Each of the three middle bays is set behind flat brick pilasters supporting a semicircular, wood springing arch, and contains an original recessed, semicircular, multilight window at the second level, and a rectangular wood plaque above a ground-floor opening.

The building was the first purpose-built town hall for Bourne, which was incorporated in 1884. Prior to its construction, town offices were kept first in a rented private residence, and then in the Jonathan Bourne Public Library.

== See also ==
- National Register of Historic Places listings in Barnstable County, Massachusetts
