= Barnstable County, Massachusetts =

County in Massachusetts, United States

Barnstable County
- County
- County of Barnstable
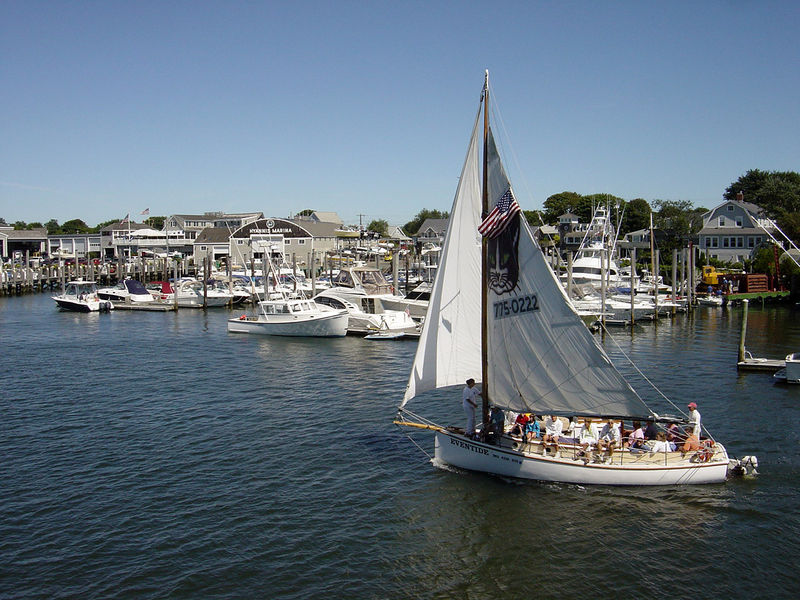
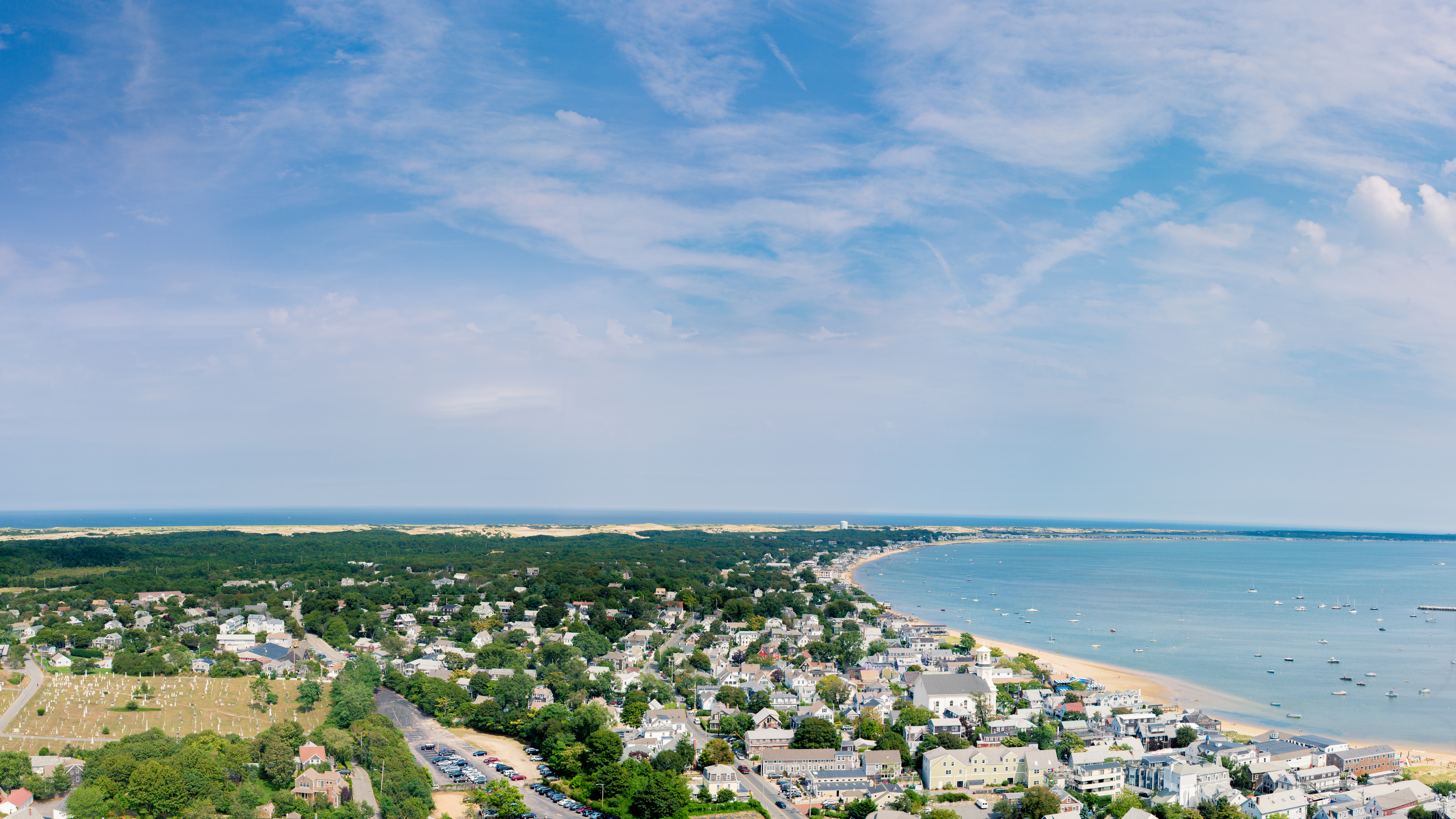
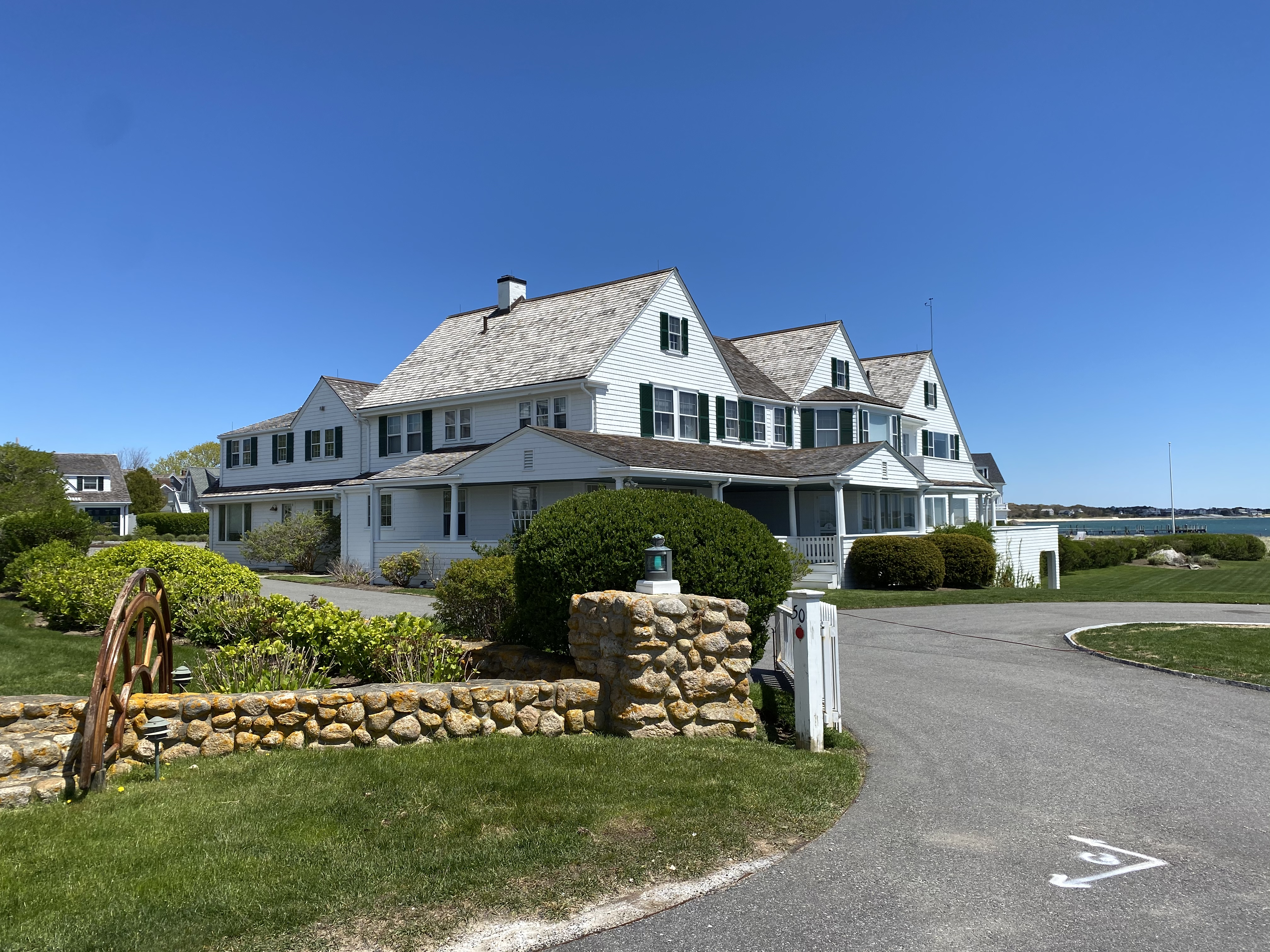
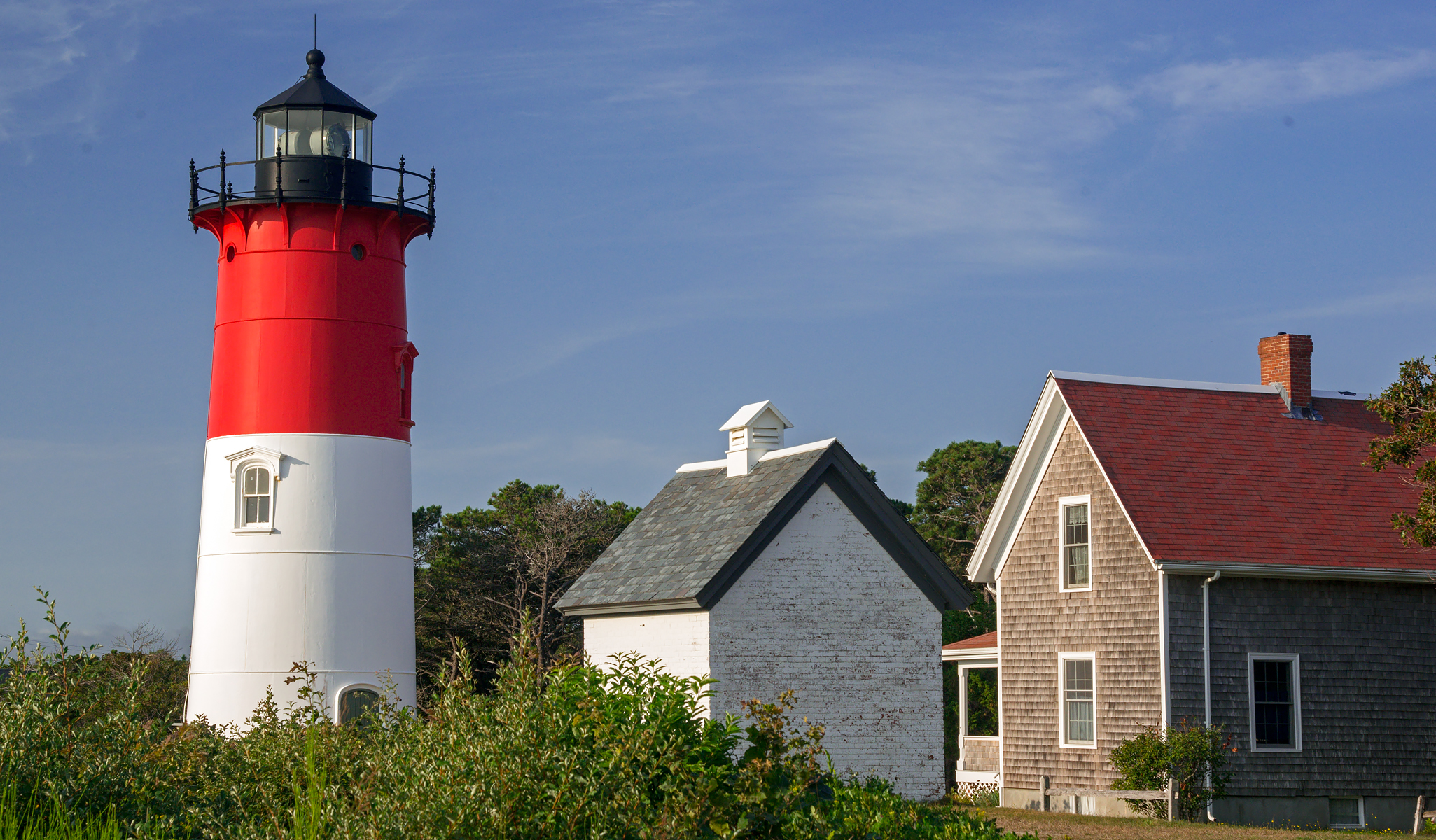
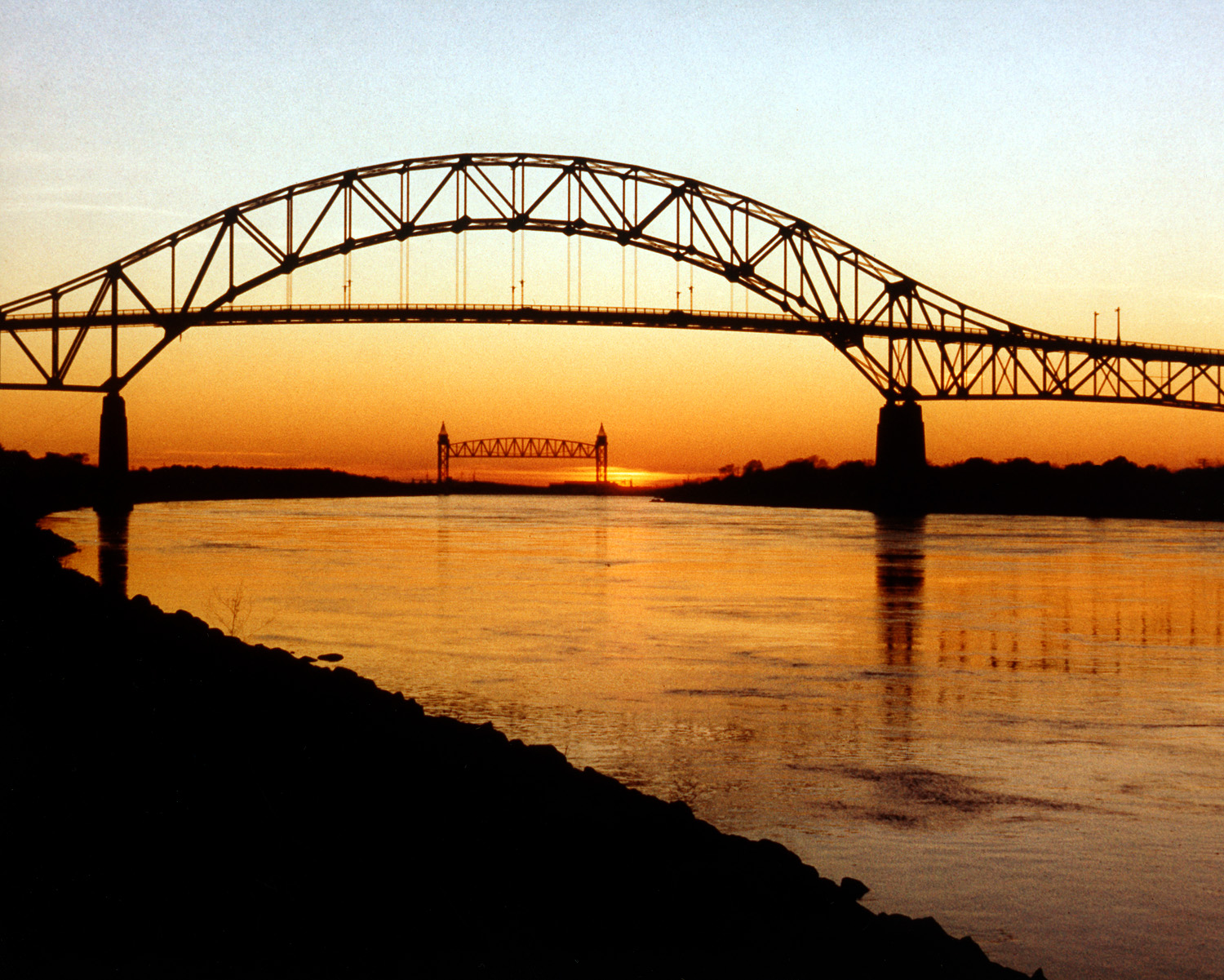
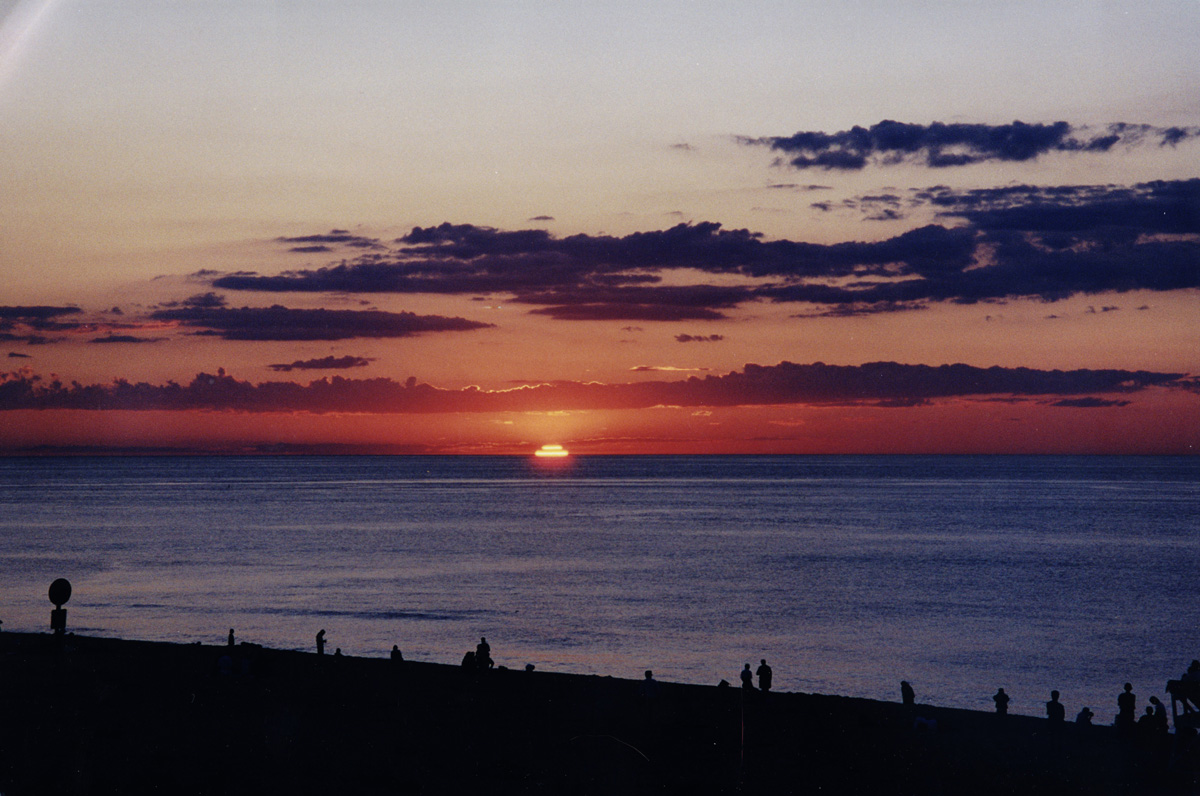
- Barnstable Provincetown Kennedy Compound Nauset Light Bourne Bridge Cape Cod National Seashore

- Flag Seal

- Location within the U.S. state of Massachusetts
- Coordinates: 41°41′56″N 70°18′07″W
- Country: United States
- State: Massachusetts
- Founded: June 2, 1685
- Named for: Town of Barnstable
- Seat: Barnstable
- Largest town: Barnstable

Area
  - Total: 1,306 sq mi (3,380 km^{2})
  - Land: 394 sq mi (1,020 km^{2})
  - Water: 912 sq mi (2,360 km^{2}) 70%

Population (2020)
  - Total: 228,996
  - Estimate (2025): 233,539 ▲
  - Density: 581/sq mi (224/km^{2})
- Time zone: UTC−5 (Eastern)
  - Summer (DST): UTC−4 (EDT)
- Congressional district: 9th
- Website: www.capecod.gov

Barnstable County (/ˈbɑːrnstəbəl/ BARN-stə-bəl) is a county in the U.S. state of Massachusetts. At the 2020 census, the population was 228,996. The county seat is Barnstable. The county consists of Cape Cod and associated islands (some adjacent islands are in Dukes County and Nantucket County). Barnstable County was formed within the Plymouth Colony on June 2, 1685, including the towns of Falmouth, Sandwich, and others to the east and north on Cape Cod. Plymouth Colony was merged into the Province of Massachusetts Bay in 1691.

== History ==
=== Giovanni da Verrazzano ===
Cape Cod is described in a letter from the Italian explorer Giovanni da Verrazzano to Francis I of France, relating the details of a voyage to the New World made on behalf of the French crown in the ship Dauphine, the only surviving of a fleet of four. Sailing from Madeira in 1524, the Dauphine made land in North Carolina in March. It sailed north to Newfoundland, mapping the coast and interviewing the natives, whom he found friendly south of the cape, but unfriendly north of it. To the north of an island that reminded Verrazzano of Rhodes, the Dauphine made its way with difficulty over shoals "never less than three feet deep" extending "from the continent fifty leagues out to sea," which Brevoort, based on their extent, has identified as Nantucket Shoals. Verrazzano called them Armellini. On the other side was a promontory, Pallavisino, which is probably the cape, as they sailed along it for "fifty leagues." Details of the north end are not given, but subsequently they came to a "high country, full of very dense forests, composed of pines," which, according to Brevoort and others, resembles the coast of Maine.

=== Bartholomew Gosnold ===
After Verrazzano, what is now the eastern United States acquired the map label of New France, but France had no way to develop it. Scattered colonies in the wilderness of a few dozen men could not be supported until the foundation of Quebec in 1608. Meanwhile, the paper claim did not deter entrepreneurs. In March 1602, Bartholomew Gosnold set sail from Falmouth, Cornwall, in the ship, Concord, transporting a crew of eight, an exploration party of 12, and 20 colonists, with the intent of establishing a trading post in the New World. Intersecting the coast of Maine, they turned to the south, encountered what appeared to be an island, and dropped anchor in Provincetown Harbor. Gosnold at first called the land Shoal Hope, but after discovering it was a cape, and acquiring a hold full of cod from the abundant schools in Cape Cod Bay, he changed the name to Cape Cod.

Gosnold explored the cape, establishing good relations with the natives there, approximately 1500 members of the Nauset Tribe, closely related in language and custom to the Wampanoag people of the mainland, and under their sovereignty. John Brereton, chaplain of the expedition, reported that they were dark-skinned, customarily nude except for deerskins over the shoulders and sealskins around the waist, and wore their long, black hair up in a knot. They painted their bodies. Some knew a few English words, which is something of a historical problem, as Gosnold and his companions are believed to have been the first English to land in America. Gosnold made a point of describing how healthy the people appeared.

Subsequently, Gosnold sailed around the cape to discover an island, "full of wood, vines, gooseberry bushes, whortleberries, raspberries, eglantines, etc.," as well as large numbers of shore birds. He named it Martha's Vineyard after his daughter. Another island nearby, Cuttyhunk Island, he named Elizabeth Island, in honor of Elizabeth I of England, from which the Elizabeth Islands take their name. He intended to place a trading post there, but when the time came for the return voyage, the colonists decided not to remain. Gosnold ventured a second time to the New World in 1608 as Captain John Smith's second in command of the Jamestown expedition. After three months there, he died of malaria.

=== Martin Pring ===
In 1603, another mercantile expedition set sail from Bristol, England, in two ships, the Speedwell and the Discoverer, commanded by a 23-year-old captain, Martin Pring. Elizabeth I had died two weeks earlier, but Pring had secured permission from Sir Walter Raleigh, who held from the queen exploration rights to all of North America. Pring's expedition reached the New England coast in the summer of 1603, exploring portions of present-day Maine and Massachusetts in search of sassafras, which was then prized in Europe as a remedy for syphilis and other ailments. Pring's party landed on Cape Cod, where they spent several weeks gathering sassafras and trading with the local Wampanoag inhabitants, before returning to England with a profitable cargo. The voyage helped publicize the commercial potential of the region and influenced later English colonization efforts.

=== Founding of the county ===
On June 2, 1685, the General Court of Plymouth Colony established Barnstable County as one of three counties in the colony, alongside Plymouth and Bristol. The new county was named for the town of Barnstable, itself named for the English port of Barnstaple in Devon. At its founding, Barnstable County included the towns of Sandwich, Barnstable, Yarmouth, Eastham, and Falmouth. When Plymouth Colony was merged into the Province of Massachusetts Bay in 1691, Barnstable County was retained intact, and additional towns were incorporated within its boundaries over the following two centuries.

=== Colonial era and the Revolution ===
Through the seventeenth and eighteenth centuries, the Cape's economy was built around small-scale farming, fishing, coastal trade, and the harvest of salt hay from the extensive marshes that fringed its bays. A solar-evaporation sea-salt industry, pioneered by Captain John Sears of Dennis beginning around 1776, became one of the major industries in nearly every Cape town through the early and mid-nineteenth century before fading by 1900 with the arrival of railroads and refrigerated commercial salt from elsewhere. During the American Revolutionary War, Cape Cod ports were vulnerable to British naval action; on April 3, 1779, a British fleet fired on Falmouth, but an attempted landing was repulsed by local militia under Colonel Nathaniel Freeman and Major Joseph Dimmick. The Cape produced several prominent figures of the revolutionary era, including James Otis and Mercy Otis Warren of West Barnstable.

=== Whaling and maritime era ===
In the nineteenth century, the Cape's economy turned increasingly to the sea. Provincetown, Wellfleet, and other Outer Cape ports developed substantial whaling and cod-fishing fleets, while shipbuilding and coastal trade flourished in mid-Cape towns. The county's population peaked at 35,990 in 1860 before entering a long decline driven by the collapse of whaling, the rise of steam-powered shipping that bypassed Cape ports, and emigration of young people to the cities and the West. By 1920 the population had fallen to 26,670, well below mid-nineteenth-century levels.

=== Railroad, tourism, and the Cape Cod Canal ===
The arrival of the Cape Cod Branch Railroad in the 1840s and its extension to Provincetown in 1873 transformed the regional economy, opening the Cape to summer tourism from Boston and beyond. Resort hotels, cottage colonies, and artist communities developed in towns such as Provincetown, Chatham, and Falmouth in the late nineteenth and early twentieth centuries. In 1914 the Cape Cod Canal opened, connecting Cape Cod Bay to Buzzards Bay and physically separating the Cape from the Massachusetts mainland; the canal was later widened and acquired by the federal government, with the Bourne Bridge and Sagamore Bridge opening in 1935 to carry road traffic over the new waterway.

=== Cape Cod National Seashore and the modern era ===
On August 7, 1961, President John F. Kennedy signed Public Law 87-126, establishing the Cape Cod National Seashore and permanently protecting approximately 40 miles of Outer Cape shoreline and inland habitat from development. The post-war decades saw a rapid expansion of the Cape's year-round and seasonal population, with county population growing from 46,805 in 1950 to 222,230 by 2000 — a nearly five-fold increase driven by tourism, retirement migration, and the spread of second-home ownership. In 1989 voters approved the Barnstable County Home Rule Charter, restructuring county government around an Assembly of Delegates and an elected board of County Commissioners. The county today is one of the few in Massachusetts that retains a meaningful functioning county government.

== Geography ==
According to the U.S. Census Bureau, the county has a total area of 1,306 square miles (3,380 km^{2}), of which 394 square miles (1,020 km^{2}) is land and 912 square miles (2,360 km^{2}) (70%) is water. It is the second largest county in Massachusetts by total area. It has about 550 miles (890 km) of shoreline.

Barnstable County is not co-extensive with Cape Cod. The latter is a geophysical place defined by its insular or peninsular landmass. According to Freeman, it is a "long, irregular peninsula" between 65 and 75 mi (105 and 121 km), measured along the north or the south shores respectively, and between 5 and 20 mi (8.0 and 32.2 km) wide. Originally, only the tip was considered the cape, but as it was settled the name extended from its tip to the shortest line across the isthmus. Barnstable County, on the other hand, is a geopolitical and legal entity. It is the area contained within the borders of all cities and towns defined to be in the county by the Massachusetts General Court. These borders were decided in episodes of disputed legislation during the centuries since the founding of Plymouth Colony.

The main difference between Cape Cod and Barnstable County is the band of water up to several miles wide extending from the shoreline to the outermost county border. The offshore area contains significant maritime life, is a recreational and transport medium, and contains historical material lost in shipwrecks.

The highest elevation in the county is 306 feet (93 m), at the summit of Pine Hill, on Joint Base Cape Cod, in Bourne. The lowest point is sea level.

=== Adjacent counties ===
Barnstable County borders Plymouth County to the northwest; off Barnstable County's southern shore are Dukes County and Nantucket County.

=== National protected areas ===
- Cape Cod National Seashore
- Mashpee National Wildlife Refuge
- Monomoy National Wildlife Refuge

== Demographics ==
With a median age of 55 years as of the 2020 census, Barnstable County is one of the oldest in the country.

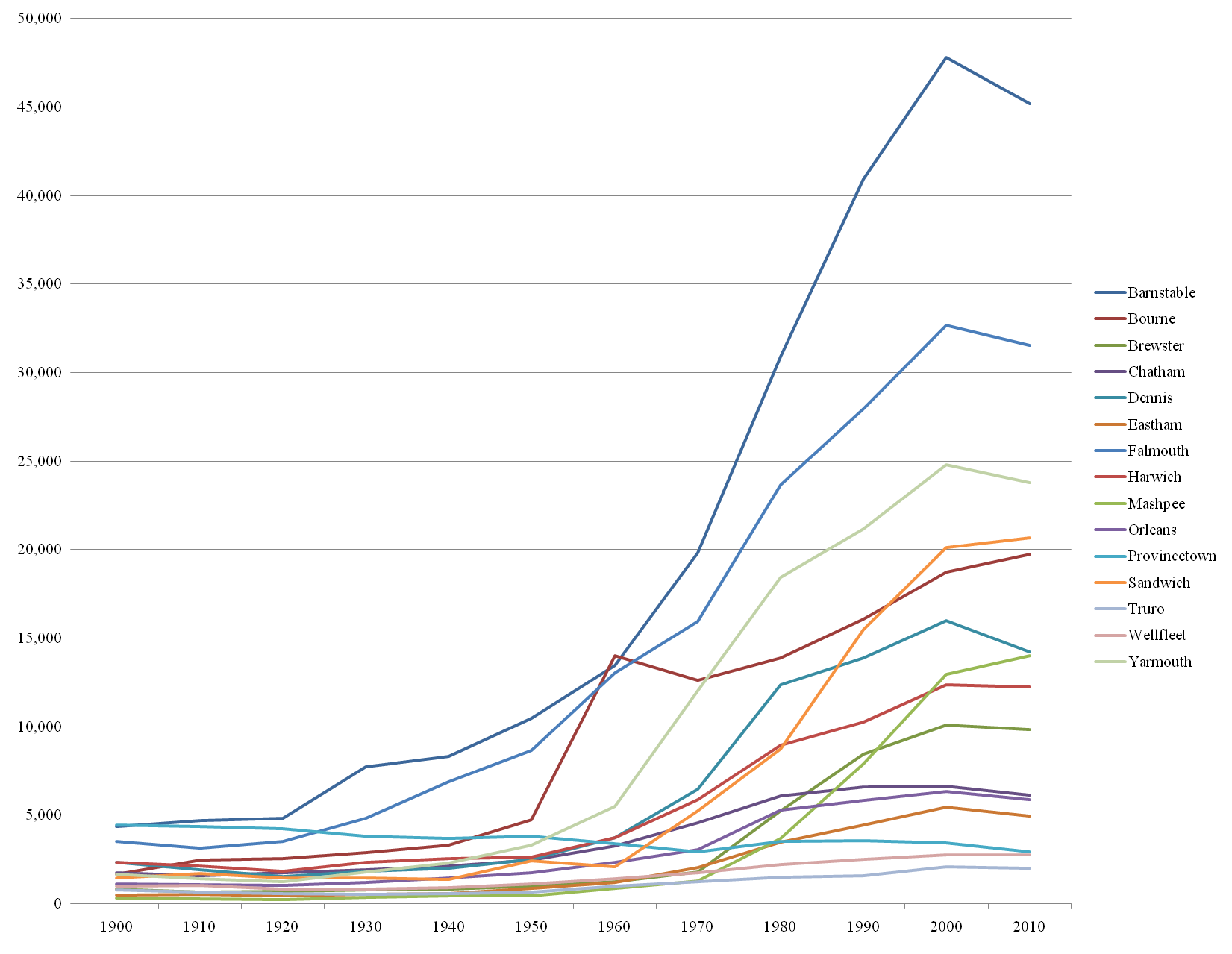
Barnstable county municipal population trends.

Historical population
Census	Pop.	Note	%±
1790	17,342		—
1800	19,293		11.3%
1810	22,211		15.1%
1820	24,026		8.2%
1830	28,514		18.7%
1840	32,548		14.1%
1850	35,276		8.4%
1860	35,990		2.0%
1870	32,774		−8.9%
1880	31,897		−2.7%
1890	29,172		−8.5%
1900	27,826		−4.6%
1910	27,542		−1.0%
1920	26,670		−3.2%
1930	32,305		21.1%
1940	37,295		15.4%
1950	46,805		25.5%
1960	70,286		50.2%
1970	96,656		37.5%
1980	147,925		53.0%
1990	186,605		26.1%
2000	222,230		19.1%
2010	215,888		−2.9%
2020	228,996		6.1%
2025 (est.)	233,539	▲	2.0%
U.S. Decennial Census; 1790–1960 1900–1990; 1990–2000 2010–2020

=== 2020 census ===
As of the 2020 census, the county had a population of 228,996. Of the residents, 14.3% were under the age of 18 and 32.2% were 65 years of age or older; the median age was 55.0 years. For every 100 females there were 91.4 males, and for every 100 females age 18 and over there were 89.4 males. 97.2% of residents lived in urban areas and 2.8% lived in rural areas.

The racial makeup of the county was 85.8% White, 2.9% Black or African American, 0.5% American Indian and Alaska Native, 1.4% Asian, 0.0% Native Hawaiian and Pacific Islander, 2.4% from some other race, and 6.9% from two or more races. Hispanic or Latino residents of any race comprised 3.5% of the population.

There were 103,368 households in the county, of which 18.6% had children under the age of 18 living with them and 29.9% had a female householder with no spouse or partner present. About 33.0% of all households were made up of individuals and 19.2% had someone living alone who was 65 years of age or older.

There were 164,885 housing units, of which 37.3% were vacant. Among occupied housing units, 77.6% were owner-occupied and 22.4% were renter-occupied. The homeowner vacancy rate was 1.4% and the rental vacancy rate was 8.9%.

=== Racial and ethnic composition ===
Barnstable County, Massachusetts – Racial and ethnic composition Note: the US Census treats Hispanic/Latino as an ethnic category. This table excludes Latinos from the racial categories and assigns them to a separate category. Hispanics/Latinos may be of any race.
Race / Ethnicity (NH = Non-Hispanic)	Pop 1980	Pop 1990	Pop 2000	Pop 2010	Pop 2020	% 1980	% 1990	% 2000	% 2010	% 2020
White alone (NH)	142,277	177,956	207,518	197,327	194,561	96.18%	95.37%	93.38%	91.40%	84.96%
Black or African American alone (NH)	1,749	2,727	3,848	3,857	6,409	1.18%	1.46%	1.73%	1.79%	2.80%
Native American or Alaska Native alone (NH)	812	1,127	1,148	1,184	1,092	0.55%	0.60%	0.52%	0.55%	0.48%
Asian alone (NH)	447	942	1,363	2,263	3,183	0.30%	0.50%	0.61%	1.05%	1.39%
Native Hawaiian or Pacific Islander alone (NH)	x	x	50	65	65	x	x	0.02%	0.03%	0.03%
Other race alone (NH)	1,586	1,566	1,842	2,284	3,448	1.07%	0.84%	0.83%	1.06%	1.51%
Mixed race or Multiracial (NH)	x	x	3,461	4,221	12,330	x	x	1.56%	1.96%	5.38%
Hispanic or Latino (any race)	1,054	2,287	3,000	4,687	7,908	0.71%	1.23%	1.35%	2.17%	3.45%
Total	147,925	186,605	222,230	215,888	228,996	100.00%	100.00%	100.00%	100.00%	100.00%

=== 2010 census ===
As of the 2010 United States census, there were 215,888 people, 95,755 households, and 58,724 families residing in the county. The population density was 548.3 inhabitants per square mile (211.7/km^{2}). There were 160,281 housing units at an average density of 407.1 per square mile (157.2/km^{2}). The racial makeup of the county was 92.7% white, 1.9% black or African American, 1.1% Asian, 0.6% American Indian, 1.5% from other races, and 2.2% from two or more races. Those of Hispanic or Latino origin made up 2.2% of the population. In terms of ancestry, 27.0% were Irish, 19.2% were English, 11.4% were Italian, 11.4% were American, and 9.1% were German.

Of the 95,755 households, 22.2% had children under the age of 18 living with them, 48.3% were married couples living together, 9.6% had a female householder with no husband present, 38.7% were non-families, and 31.8% of all households were made up of individuals. The average household size was 2.21 and the average family size was 2.77. The median age was 49.9 years.

The median income for a household in the county was $60,317 and the median income for a family was $75,056. Males had a median income of $53,480 versus $41,990 for females. The per capita income for the county was $35,246. About 5.0% of families and 7.2% of the population were below the poverty line, including 9.8% of those under age 18 and 5.6% of those age 65 or over.

=== 2000 census ===
As of the census of 2000, there were 222,230 people, 94,822 households, and 61,065 families residing in the county. The population density was 562 people per square mile (217 people/km^{2}). There were 147,083 housing units at an average density of 372 per square mile (144/km^{2}). The racial makeup of the county was 94.23% White, 1.79% Black or African American, 0.56% Native American, 0.63% Asian, 0.02% Pacific Islander, 1.11% from other races, and 1.66% from two or more races. 1.35% of the population were Hispanic or Latino of any race. 24.0% were of Irish, 15.6% English, 9.4% Italian, 5.9% German and 5.0% "American" ancestry, 93.6% spoke English, 1.7% Portuguese, 1.4% Spanish and 1.0% French as their first language.

There were 94,822 households, out of which 24.30% had children under the age of 18 living with them, 52.20% were married couples living together, 9.40% had a female householder with no husband present, and 35.60% were non-families. 29.50% of all households were made up of individuals, and 14.40% had someone living alone who was 65 years of age or older. The average household size was 2.28 and the average family size was 2.82.

In the county, the population was spread out, with 20.40% under the age of 18, 5.20% from 18 to 24, 25.00% from 25 to 44, 26.20% from 45 to 64, and 23.10% who were 65 years of age or older. The median age was 45 years. For every 100 females, there were 89.90 males. For every 100 females age 18 and over, there were 86.10 males.

The median income for a household in the county was $45,933, and the median income for a family was $54,728. Males had a median income of $41,033 versus $30,079 for females. The per capita income for the county was $25,318. About 4.60% of families and 6.90% of the population were below the poverty line, including 8.60% of those under age 18 and 5.00% of those age 65 or over.

== Politics ==
United States presidential election results for Barnstable County, Massachusetts
Year	Republican		Democratic		Third party(ies)	
Year	No.	%	No.	%	No.	%
1804	724	64.24%	403	35.76%	0	0.00%
1812	1,282	71.62%	508	28.38%	0	0.00%
1820	648	76.69%	197	23.31%	0	0.00%
1824	769	83.23%	155	16.77%	0	0.00%
1828	627	96.17%	25	3.83%	0	0.00%
1832	1,013	76.17%	194	14.59%	123	9.25%
1836	1,187	57.37%	882	42.63%	0	0.00%
1840	2,751	62.91%	1,554	35.54%	68	1.55%
1844	2,290	57.89%	1,415	35.77%	251	6.34%
1848	2,015	60.46%	802	24.06%	516	15.48%
1852	1,379	50.09%	892	32.40%	482	17.51%
1856	2,667	72.67%	703	19.16%	300	8.17%
1860	2,371	75.34%	133	4.23%	643	20.43%
1864	3,994	85.07%	701	14.93%	0	0.00%
1868	3,381	83.94%	647	16.06%	0	0.00%
1872	2,703	88.45%	353	11.55%	0	0.00%
1876	3,493	81.54%	785	18.32%	6	0.14%
1880	3,473	77.75%	956	21.40%	38	0.85%
1884	3,144	67.98%	937	20.26%	544	11.76%
1888	3,371	73.36%	1,044	22.72%	180	3.92%
1892	3,688	70.49%	1,373	26.24%	171	3.27%
1896	4,456	86.39%	517	10.02%	185	3.59%
1900	3,372	79.74%	749	17.71%	108	2.55%
1904	3,638	77.72%	900	19.23%	143	3.05%
1908	3,312	76.30%	777	17.90%	252	5.81%
1912	1,249	25.11%	1,322	26.57%	2,404	48.32%
1916	2,836	58.68%	1,892	39.15%	105	2.17%
1920	6,383	84.41%	1,125	14.88%	54	0.71%
1924	7,333	85.50%	881	10.27%	363	4.23%
1928	9,886	76.96%	2,899	22.57%	60	0.47%
1932	9,476	70.05%	3,829	28.31%	222	1.64%
1936	11,337	68.77%	4,751	28.82%	397	2.41%
1940	12,659	69.87%	5,351	29.53%	108	0.60%
1944	11,543	69.85%	4,938	29.88%	44	0.27%
1948	14,633	75.08%	4,616	23.68%	241	1.24%
1952	20,943	80.64%	4,984	19.19%	44	0.17%
1956	23,472	83.23%	4,672	16.57%	58	0.21%
1960	20,900	62.63%	12,423	37.23%	49	0.15%
1964	15,133	42.80%	20,101	56.85%	121	0.34%
1968	24,296	57.63%	16,546	39.24%	1,320	3.13%
1972	36,340	61.14%	22,636	38.08%	466	0.78%
1976	39,295	53.74%	31,268	42.76%	2,554	3.49%
1980	41,493	50.43%	23,952	29.11%	16,828	20.45%
1984	51,261	56.99%	38,369	42.66%	321	0.36%
1988	49,676	49.74%	48,747	48.81%	1,449	1.45%
1992	33,916	31.12%	46,641	42.79%	28,440	26.09%
1996	40,144	36.25%	59,223	53.48%	11,370	10.27%
2000	49,686	41.03%	62,363	51.50%	9,037	7.46%
2004	58,527	44.29%	72,156	54.60%	1,465	1.11%
2008	55,694	42.08%	74,264	56.11%	2,395	1.81%
2012	60,446	45.41%	70,822	53.20%	1,847	1.39%
2016	54,099	39.84%	72,430	53.34%	9,252	6.81%
2020	55,311	36.79%	91,994	61.20%	3,020	2.01%
2024	57,451	38.61%	88,129	59.23%	3,205	2.15%

Until the 1990s, Barnstable County was a stronghold of the Republican Party. The county voted for Republican presidential candidates in every election from 1856 to 1988, with the exception of 1912 (when the Progressive candidate won the county) and 1964. It has since come to favor the Democratic Party, supporting Democratic candidates in all presidential elections since 1992.

Despite Barnstable's safe Democratic swing federally, it remained competitive well into the 21st century, with Republicans and Democrats frequently trading control of the county council and county positions and Republicans dominating local elections. The shift of the national Republican Party, in addition to the disorganization of the state Republican Party, has allowed Democrats to slowly make inroads in the county. The onset of the COVID-19 pandemic has been cited as an accelerant of that effect, with left-leaning remote workers moving into the county from places like Boston and New York City, and Barnstable County is now predominantly Democratic at the local level as well. Despite this, Barnstable still remains the Republican Party's strongest county in terms of voter registration, although, like Democrats, they are dwarfed by registered Independents.

=== Voter registration ===
Voter registration and party enrollment as of February 2025
Unenrolled	129,067	65.66%
Democratic	42,512	21.63%
Republican	23,181	11.79%
Other parties	1,806	0.92%
Total	196,566	100%

== Government ==
Barnstable County has one of the last functioning county governments in Massachusetts. County government consists of a legislative branch (Barnstable County Assembly of Delegates) and an executive branch (Barnstable County Commissioners).

=== Barnstable County Assembly of Delegates ===
The Assembly of Delegates is the legislative branch of Barnstable County. There are 15 towns in Barnstable County, each town represented on the Assembly. In 1989, by an Act of the Massachusetts General Court and confirmed by most Barnstable County voters, the Barnstable County Home Rule Charter went into effect and the first session of the Assembly of Delegates convened. All legislative powers of the county are vested in the Assembly, which acts by ordinance and adopts resolutions.

The Assembly of Delegates consists of 15 delegates, one representing each of the towns in Barnstable County. A delegate's vote is weighted on the basis of the population of his or her town. The town of Barnstable, for example, has the largest share of the vote, at 20.92%, and Truro has the smallest, at 0.93%.

=== Barnstable County Commissioners ===
There are three Barnstable County Commissioners, who together act as the Executive Branch of county government. Each commissioner is elected at large and serves a four-year staggered term. The commissioners direct county agencies, prepare budgets to submit to the Assembly, oversee the care of county property and finances, propose ordinances to the Assembly, and appoint the County Administrator.

Ronald Bergstrom (D-Chatham), Chair

- Term: 2023–2027

Sheila Lyons (D-Wellfleet), Vice-chair

- Term: 2021–2025

Mark Forest (D-Yarmouth), Commissioner

- Term: 2021–2025

=== Cape Cod Commission ===
The planning agency of Barnstable County is the Cape Cod Commission.

== Communities ==
Cities and towns have been legally incorporated as such under the laws of the State of Massachusetts. They include the entire territory of the state. A city may continue to name itself a town even though legally a city. Villages are subordinate to cities or towns. In addition to and not necessarily based on these legal municipalities are the arbitrary divisions of the United States Census Bureau. Villages are census divisions which may be used as special purpose municipalities or may have a greater sense of civic identity than their constituent town(s), but are not fully functioning municipal corporations. For example, the City of Barnstable has five fire districts that cover the seven villages - each village has its own fire department except that Centerville, Osterville and Marstons Mills have combined their efforts into the COMM Fire Department.

Upper Cape

1 / Bourne; 2 / Falmouth	3 / Sandwich; 4 / Mashpee

Mid-Cape

5 / Barnstable; 6 / Yarmouth	7 / Dennis

Lower Cape

8 / Brewster; 9 / Harwich	10 / Chatham; 11 / Orleans

Outer Cape (occasionally, Lower Cape)

12 / Eastham; 13 / Wellfleet	14 / Truro; 15 / Provincetown

=== City ===
- Barnstable (county seat)

=== Towns ===
- Bourne
- Brewster
- Chatham
- Dennis
- Eastham
- Falmouth
- Harwich
- Mashpee
- Orleans
- Provincetown
- Sandwich
- Truro
- Wellfleet
- Yarmouth

=== Villages ===
- Barnstable
- Centerville
- Cotuit
- Craigville
- Hyannis
- Hyannis Port
- Marstons Mills
- North Harwich
- North Truro
- Osterville
- Pleasant Lake
- South Harwich
- West Barnstable
- West Harwich
- Monument Beach
- Pocasset
- Sagamore
- Sagamore Beach
- Cataumet
- Buzzards Bay

=== Census-designated places ===
- Bourne
- Brewster
- Buzzards Bay
- Chatham
- Dennis
- Dennis Port
- East Dennis
- East Falmouth
- East Harwich
- East Sandwich
- Falmouth
- Forestdale
- Harwich Center
- Harwich Port
- Mashpee Neck
- Monomoscoy Island
- Monument Beach
- New Seabury
- North Eastham
- North Falmouth
- Northwest Harwich
- Orleans
- Pocasset
- Popponesset
- Popponesset Island
- Provincetown
- Sagamore
- Sandwich
- Seabrook
- Seconsett Island
- South Dennis
- South Yarmouth
- Teaticket
- West Chatham
- West Dennis
- West Falmouth
- West Yarmouth
- Woods Hole
- Yarmouth Port

=== Unincorporated communities ===
- Bellingsgate
- Captains Hill
- Captains Village
- Ferris Fields
- Hatchville
- Long Point
- Monomoy Island
- South Brewster
- South Chatham
- South Sandwich
- Waquoit
- Wood End

== Education ==
School districts include:

Officially K-12:

- Barnstable School District
- Bourne School District
- Dennis-Yarmouth School District
- Falmouth School District
- Mashpee School District
- Monomoy Regional School District
- Provincetown School District - While it is designated as a K-12 district, Provincetown High School ended operations after 2013.
- Sandwich School District

Secondary:

- Nauset School District

Elementary:

- Brewster School District
- Eastham School District
- Orleans School District
- Truro School District
- Wellfleet School District

Truro residents are eligible to go to Nauset Regional High School, and formerly to Provincetown High.

Cape Cod Community College is in the county.

== Economy ==
The county is known for aquaculture. It ranks first in the state for revenue from aquaculture products.

== Transportation ==
=== Major highways ===
- US 6
- Route 3
- Route 6A
- Route 25
- Route 28
  - Route 28A
- Route 39
- Route 130
- Route 132
- Route 134
- Route 137
- Route 149
- Route 151

== See also ==
- List of counties in Massachusetts
- List of Massachusetts locations by per capita income
- Barnstable County Correctional Facility
- Barnstable County Courthouse
- Barnstable County Hospital
- Barnstable Municipal Airport
- Cape Cod
- Cape Cod Commission
- Joint Base Cape Cod
- Nantucket Sound
- National Register of Historic Places listings in Barnstable County, Massachusetts
- Registry of Deeds (Massachusetts)
- Scusset Beach State Reservation
- Shawme-Crowell State Forest
- USS Barnstable County (LST-1197)

== General bibliography ==
- Conway, Jack North (2008). The Cape Cod Canal. Charleston, South Carolina: The History Press.
- Freeman, Frederick (1860). The History of Cape Cod: the Annals of Barnstable County and of its Several Towns, Including the District of Mashpee. Vol. I. Boston: Geo. C Rand & Avery.
- Freeman, Frederick (1862). The History of Cape Cod: the Annals of the Thirteen Towns of Barnstable County. Vol. II. Boston: Geo. C Rand & Avery.
- Whalen, Richard F. (2007). Truro. Charleston, South Carolina: The History Press.
