= Wings Neck =

Coordinates: 41°41′13″N 70°38′38″W

Wings Neck is a peninsula that juts out into Buzzards Bay on the south side of the Cape Cod Canal, in Bourne, Massachusetts, USA.

The interior of the neck contains a tennis/pickleball court, which is used as a private court for the residents. On the southern face, facing Basset's Island, lies a sail school: Buzzard's sailing school. This establishment operates as a summer camp, teaching kids how to sail.

The southwestern tip of the neck is the site of the Wing's Neck Lighthouse, which operated from 1889 to 1945, and is now a private residence.
