= National Marine Life Center =

Non-profit marine center in Massachusetts, USA

Coordinates: 41°44′38.20″N 70°36′48.21″W

Logo of the Center

The National Marine Life Center is an independent, non-profit marine animal hospital, science, and education center based in Bourne, Massachusetts. Their mission is to rehabilitate for release stranded sea turtles, seals, dolphins, porpoises, and small whales, and to advance scientific knowledge and education in marine wildlife and conservation.
