= Bourne (CDP), Massachusetts =

Bourne, Massachusetts
- Census-designated place
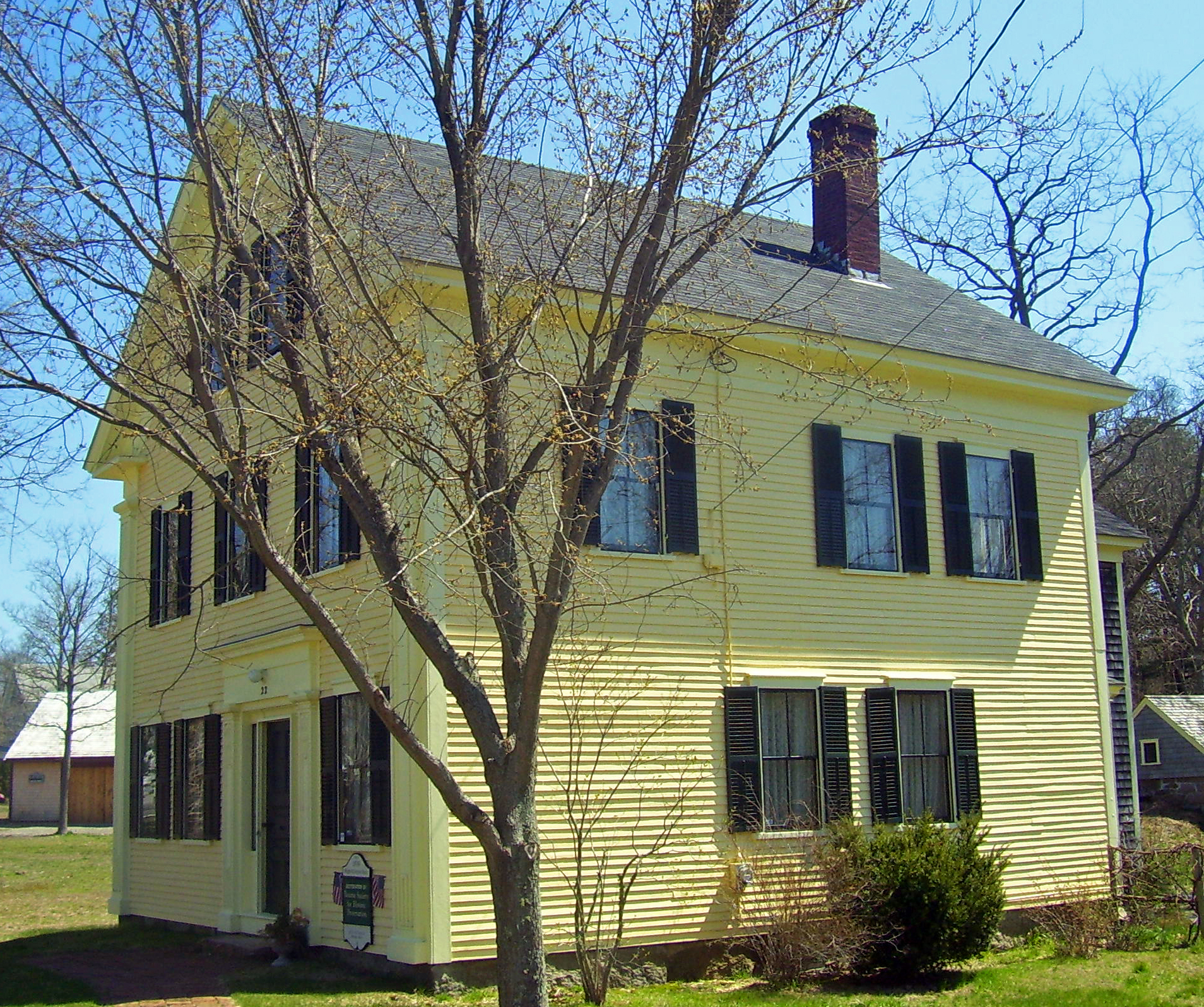
- George Briggs House

- Location in Barnstable County and the state of Massachusetts.
- Coordinates: 41°44′6″N 70°36′46″W
- Country: United States
- State: Massachusetts
- County: Barnstable
- Town: Bourne

Area
  - Total: 2.96 sq mi (7.66 km^{2})
  - Land: 1.71 sq mi (4.42 km^{2})
  - Water: 1.25 sq mi (3.24 km^{2})
- Elevation: 26 ft (8 m)

Population (2020)
  - Total: 1,497
  - Density: 878.1/sq mi (339.05/km^{2})
- Time zone: UTC-5 (Eastern (EST))
  - Summer (DST): UTC-4 (EDT)
- ZIP Code: 02532
- Area code: 508
- FIPS code: 25-07140
- GNIS feature ID: 0616366

The village of Bourne is a census-designated place (CDP) in the town of Bourne in Barnstable County, Massachusetts, United States. The population was 1,418 at the 2010 census, out of 19,754 in the town of Bourne as a whole.

== Geography ==
Bourne is located at 41°44′06″N 70°36′46″W (41.735027, -70.6128).

According to the United States Census Bureau, the CDP has a total area of 3.0 square miles (7.7 km^{2}), of which 1.7 square miles (4.4 km^{2}) is land and 1.3 square miles (3.3 km^{2}) (43.13%) is water.

== Demographics ==
Historical population
Census	Pop.	Note	%±
2020	1,497		—
U.S. Decennial Census

As of the census of 2000, there were 1,443 people, 663 households, and 422 families residing in the CDP. The population density was 323.9 people/km^{2} (839 people/mi^{2}). There were 946 housing units at an average density of 212.4 units/km^{2} (550 units/mi^{2}). The racial makeup of the CDP was 98.66% White, 0.28% Black or African American, 0.18% Native American, 0.42% Asian, 0.17% from other races, and 0.49% from two or more races. Hispanic or Latino of any race were 0.59% of the population.

There were 663 households, out of which 22.3% had children under the age of 18 living with them, 81.3% were married couples living together, 2.7% had a female householder with no husband present, and 31.3% were non-families. 30.6% of all households were made up of individuals, and 12.5% had someone living alone who was 65 years of age or older. The average household size was 2.18 and the average family size was 2.70.

In the CDP, the population was spread out, with 18.3% under the age of 18, 4.4% from 18 to 24, 24.4% from 25 to 44, 29.3% from 45 to 64, and 23.6% who were 65 years of age or older. The median age was 47 years. For every 100 females, there were 90.6 males. For every 100 females age 18 and over, there were 89.5 males.

The median income for a household in the CDP was $104,830, and the median income for a family was $160,417. Males had a median income of $88,661 versus $62,981 for females. The per capita income for the CDP was $83,055. About 0.2% of families and 0.4% of the population were below the poverty line, including 0.3% of those under age 18 and 0.6% of those age 65 or over.
