= Jonathan Bourne Public Library =

Public library in Bourne, Massachusetts

Coordinates: 41.7422°N 70.5981°W

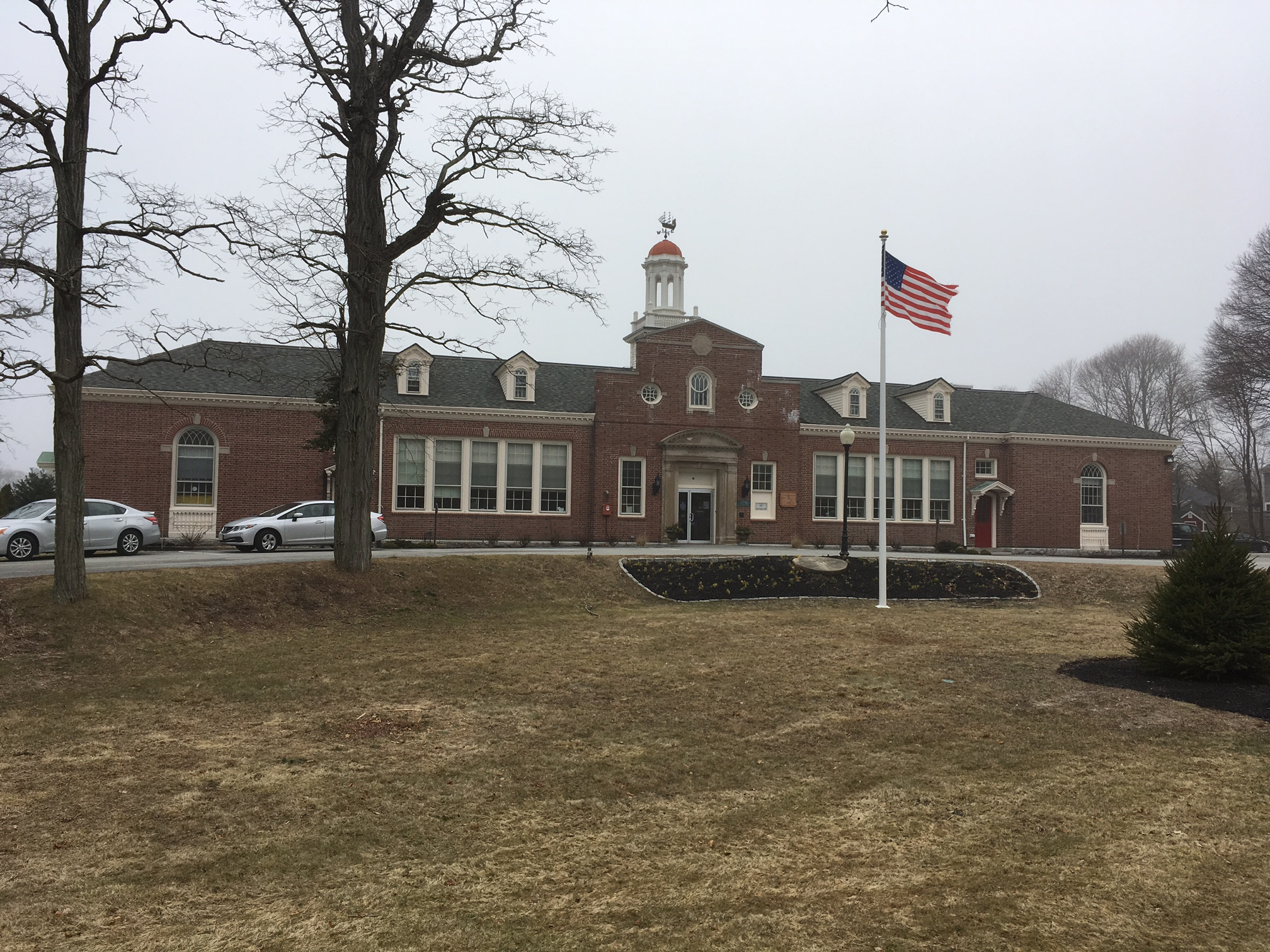
Picture of the present Jonathan Bourne Public Library in Bourne, Massachusetts

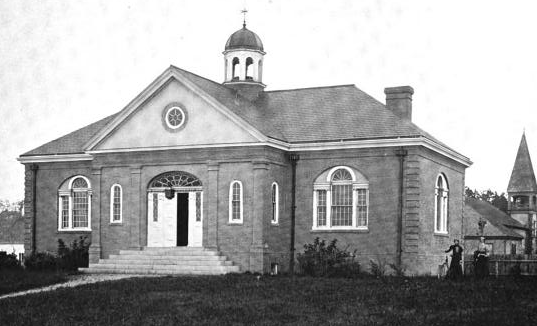
Bourne Public Library, Massachusetts, in 1899

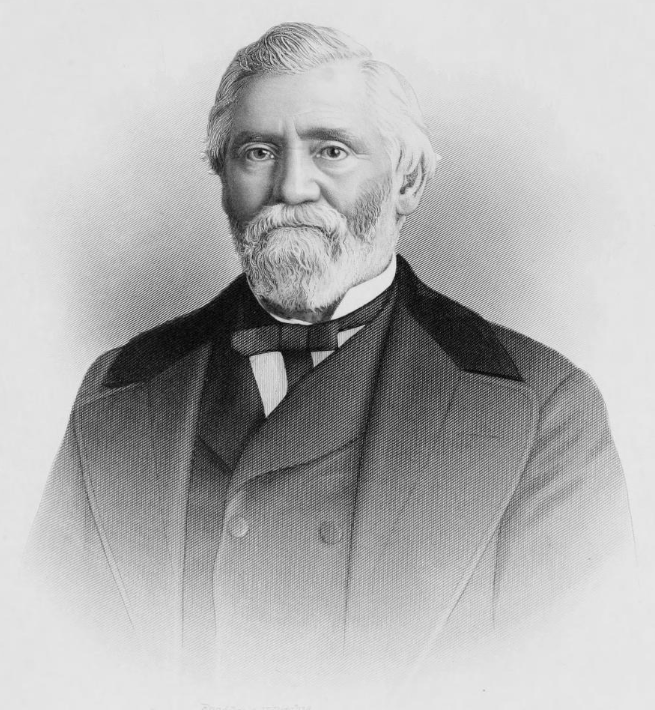
Portrait of Jonathan Bourne, the library's namesake

The Jonathan Bourne Public Library (est. 1891) is a public library in Bourne, Massachusetts. Prior to 1891, the town lacked a public library, as it was a part of the town of Sandwich. The town of Bourne was incorporated on April 2, 1884. The Bourne library was named in honor of Jonathan Bourne (1811–1889), who was a New Bedford alderman, major investor in the whaling business, member of executive councils of Massachusetts governors George D. Robinson and Oliver Ames, and namesake of the town of Bourne. Bourne's daughter, Emily Howland Bourne, donated the library's original building in 1897.

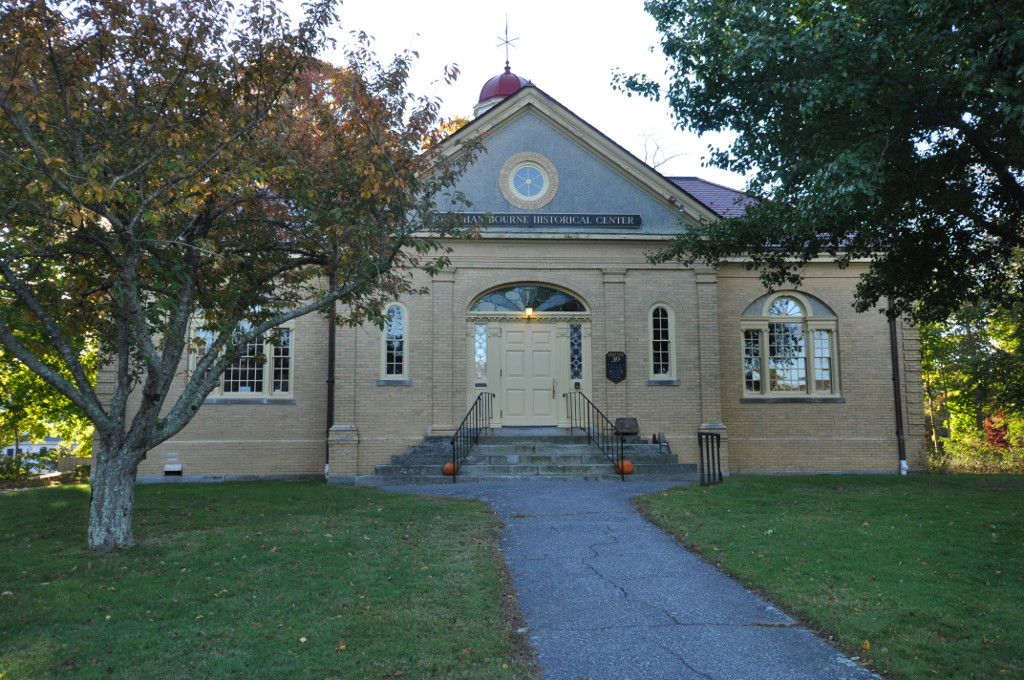

The 1897 building, located at 30 Keene Street, served as the library until 1985. During those years, space was on a number of occasions an issue, and the building was repeatedly modified to make room for more books and services. In April 1985, the library was moved to the former Frances Stowell Grammar School at 19 Sandwich Road. The old building has been repurposed as the Jonathan Bourne Historical Center, housing town archives and the local historic society. It was listed on the National Register of Historic Places in 2013.

== See also ==
- List of public libraries in Massachusetts
- New Bedford Whaling Museum, beneficiary of gift from Emily Howland Bourne, in honor of her father Jonathan Bourne.
- National Register of Historic Places listings in Barnstable County, Massachusetts
