= Sagamore, Massachusetts =

- Census-designated place
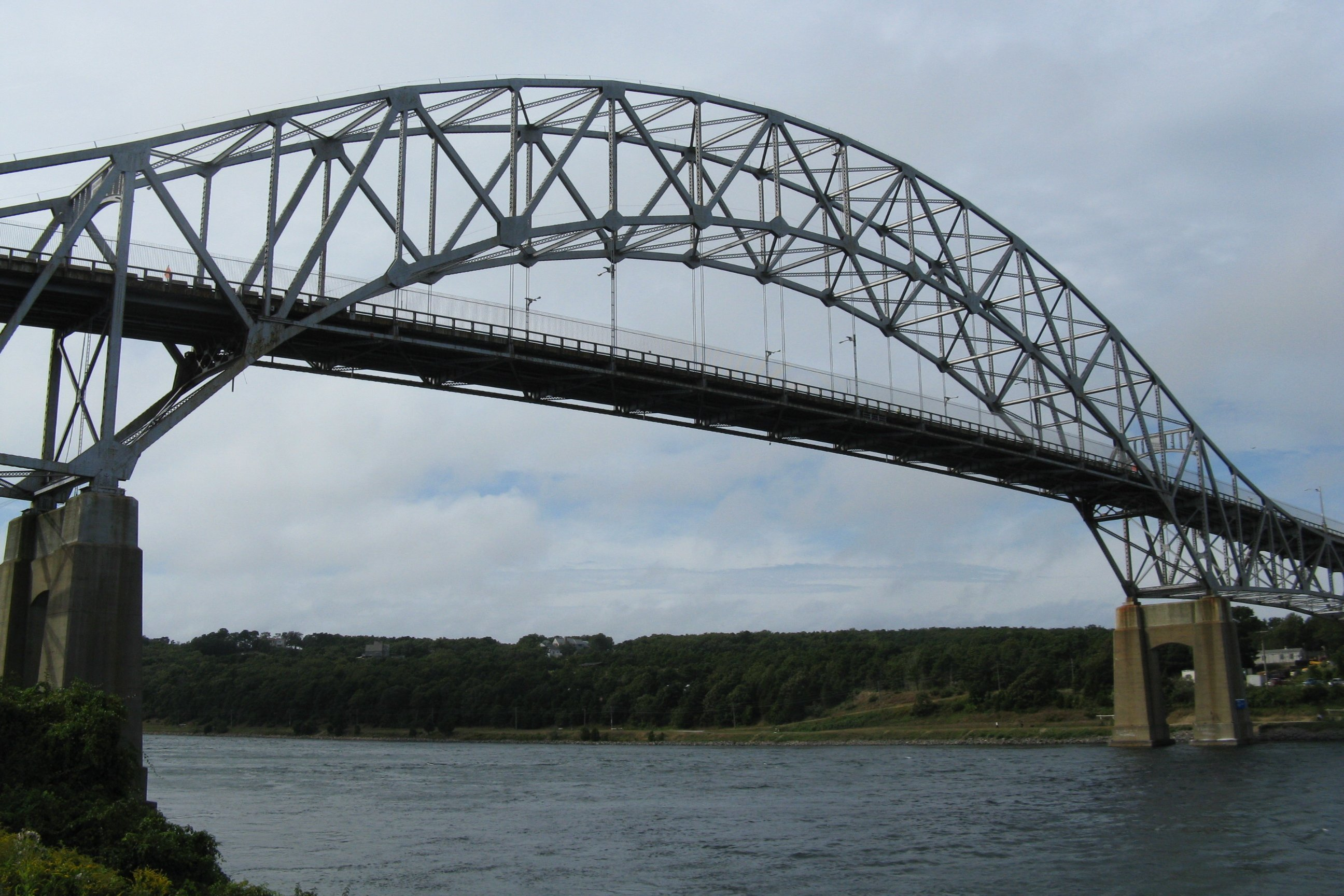
- Sagamore Bridge

- Location in Barnstable County and the state of Massachusetts.
- Coordinates: 41°47′3″N 70°32′0″W
- Country: United States
- State: Massachusetts
- County: Barnstable
- Town: Bourne

Government
  - Type: Tristan Chick

Area
  - Total: 3.51 sq mi (9.09 km^{2})
  - Land: 3.33 sq mi (8.62 km^{2})
  - Water: 0.18 sq mi (0.46 km^{2})
- Elevation: 56 ft (17 m)

Population (2020)
  - Total: 3,851
  - Density: 1,156.5/sq mi (446.51/km^{2})
- Time zone: UTC-5 (Eastern (EST))
  - Summer (DST): UTC-4 (EDT)
- ZIP Codes: 02561 (Sagamore); 02562 (Sagamore Beach)
- Area code: 508
- FIPS code: 25-58965
- GNIS feature ID: 2378214

Sagamore is a census-designated place (CDP) in the town of Bourne in Barnstable County, Massachusetts, United States. As of the 2020 census, Sagamore had a population of 3,851. "Sagamore" was one of the words used by northeastern Native Americans to designate an elected chief or leader.

== Geography ==
Sagamore is located in the northeastern corner of the town of Bourne. It is bordered to the northeast by Cape Cod Bay, to the northwest by the town of Plymouth, to the west by the Massachusetts Route 3 expressway, to the southwest and south by U.S. Route 6 (the Mid-Cape Highway), and to the east by the town of Sandwich. The northern half of Sagamore is along the shore of Cape Cod Bay, known as Sagamore Beach. The Cape Cod Canal passes east to west through the southern part of the village. The Sagamore Bridge carries Route 6 across the canal and into Sagamore.

According to the United States Census Bureau, Sagamore has a total area of 3.5 square miles (9.1 km^{2}), of which 3.3 square miles (8.6 km^{2}) is land and 0.19 square miles (0.5 km^{2}) (5.10%) is water.

== Demographics ==
Historical population
Census	Pop.	Note	%±
2020	3,851		—
U.S. Decennial Census

=== 2020 census ===
As of the 2020 census, Sagamore had a population of 3,851. The median age was 51.8 years. 15.9% of residents were under the age of 18 and 26.5% of residents were 65 years of age or older. For every 100 females there were 93.7 males, and for every 100 females age 18 and over there were 94.3 males age 18 and over.

100.0% of residents lived in urban areas, while 0.0% lived in rural areas.

There were 1,551 households in Sagamore, of which 23.3% had children under the age of 18 living in them. Of all households, 53.5% were married-couple households, 14.3% were households with a male householder and no spouse or partner present, and 24.7% were households with a female householder and no spouse or partner present. About 24.3% of all households were made up of individuals and 11.9% had someone living alone who was 65 years of age or older.

There were 1,839 housing units, of which 15.7% were vacant. The homeowner vacancy rate was 0.4% and the rental vacancy rate was 7.4%.

Racial composition as of the 2020 census
Race	Number	Percent
White	3,510	91.1%
Black or African American	36	0.9%
American Indian and Alaska Native	7	0.2%
Asian	84	2.2%
Native Hawaiian and Other Pacific Islander	0	0.0%
Some other race	52	1.4%
Two or more races	162	4.2%
Hispanic or Latino (of any race)	61	1.6%

=== 2000 census ===
As of the census of 2000, there were 3,544 people, 1,307 households, and 968 families residing in Sagamore. The population density was 407.2/km^{2} (1,056.0/mi^{2}). There were 1,532 housing units at an average density of 176.0/km^{2} (456.5/mi^{2}). The racial makeup of the village was 98.93% White, 0.61% African American, 0.45% American Indian, 0.76% Asian, 0.03% Pacific Islander, 0.10% from other races, and 0.12% from two or more races. Hispanic or Latino of any race were 0.66% of the population.

The median income for a household in Sagamore was $103,385, and the median income for a family was $158,611. The per capita income for the village was $22,650.

== See also ==
- Sagamore Beach, Massachusetts
