= Bourne, Massachusetts =

- Town
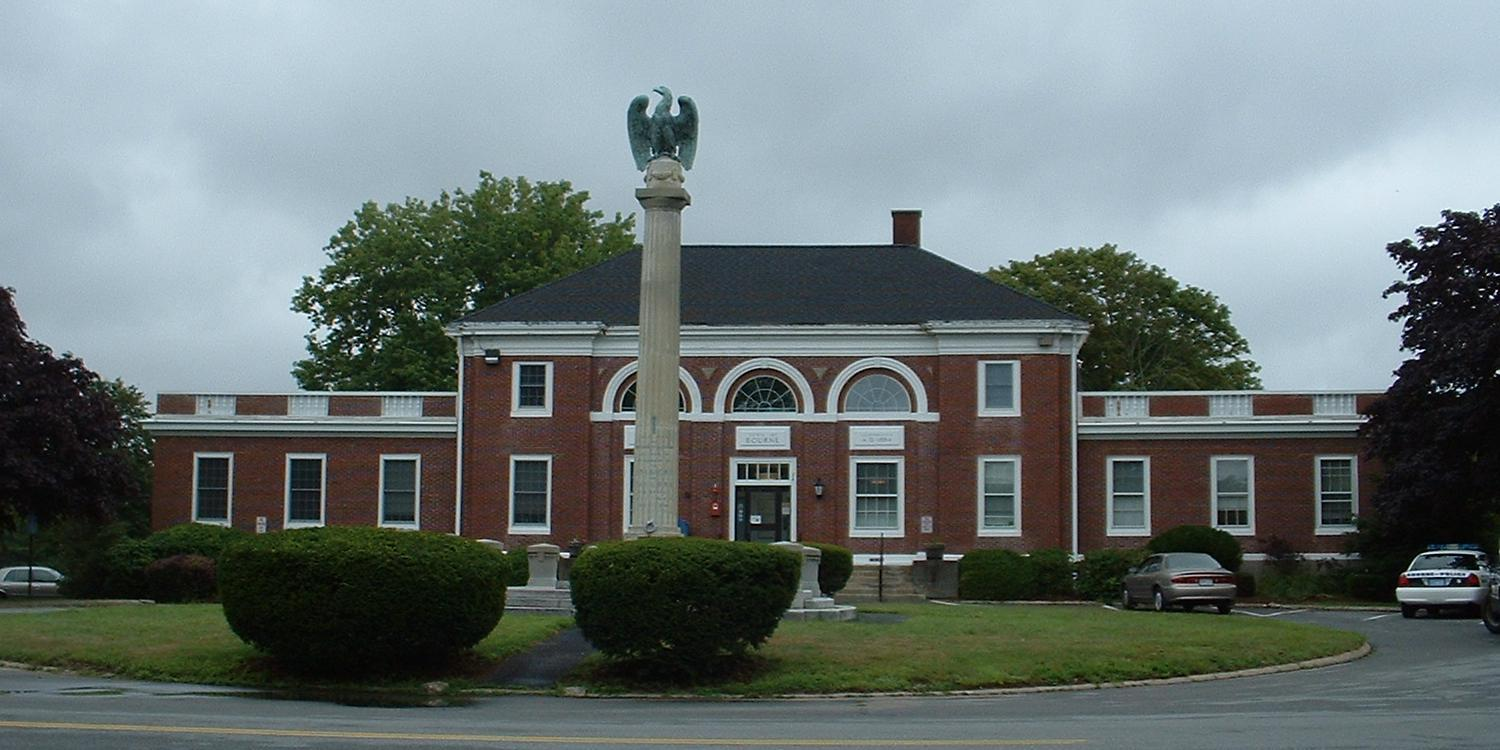
- Bourne Town Hall

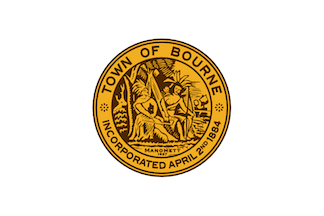
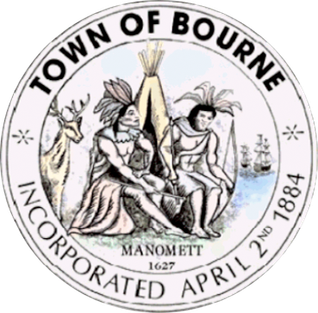
- Flag Seal

- Location in Barnstable County and the state of Massachusetts.
- Coordinates: 41°44′28″N 70°35′58″W
- Country: United States
- State: Massachusetts
- County: Barnstable
- Settled: 1640
- Incorporated: 1884
- Communities: Barlows Landing; Bourne; Bourne Corners; Buzzards Bay; Cataumet; Eustis Beach; Gray Gables; Monument Beach; North Pocasset; Patuisset; Pocasset; Sagamore; Sagamore Beach; Southwest Beach; Sunrise Beach

Government
  - Type: Open town meeting
  - Board of Selectmen: Mary Jane Mastrangelo, Member; Melissa A Ferretti, Chair; Jeanne Azarovitz, Clerk; Peter J. Meier, Senior Tenured Member; Anne Marie Siroonian, Vice Chair
  - Town Administrator: Marlene McCollem

Area
  - Total: 52.9 sq mi (136.9 km^{2})
  - Land: 40.7 sq mi (105.3 km^{2})
  - Water: 12.2 sq mi (31.6 km^{2})
- Elevation: 43 ft (13 m)

Population (2020)
  - Total: 20,452
  - Density: 503/sq mi (194.2/km^{2})
- Time zone: UTC−5 (Eastern)
  - Summer (DST): UTC−4 (Eastern)
- ZIP Codes: 02532 (Bourne); 02534 (Cataumet); 02542 (Otis ANGB); 02553 (Monument Beach); 02559 (Pocasset); 02561 (Sagamore); 02562 (Sagamore Beach)
- Area code: 508/774
- Website: www.townofbourne.com

Bourne (/bɔːrn/ BORN) is a town on Cape Cod in Massachusetts. The population was 20,452 at the 2020 census.

For geographic and demographic information on specific parts of the town of Bourne, please see the articles on Bourne (CDP), Buzzards Bay, Monument Beach, Pocasset, Sagamore, and Sagamore Beach.

== History ==
Bourne was first settled in 1640 by Ezra Perry as a part of the town of Sandwich. Prior to its separation from Sandwich, the area was referred to as West Sandwich. It was officially incorporated in 1884, the last town to be incorporated in Barnstable County. It was named for Jonathan Bourne Sr. (1811–1889), whose ancestor Richard Bourne represented Sandwich in the first Massachusetts General Court and was the first preacher to the Mashpee Wampanoag on Cape Cod. The town lies at the northeast corner of Buzzards Bay and is the site of Aptucxet Trading Post, the nation's oldest store. It was founded by the Pilgrims in 1627 at a site halfway between the two rivers which divided Cape Cod from the rest of the state. It was out of this location that the Cape Cod Canal was formed, in order to save time and lives by eliminating the need to sail around the hazardous eastern shores of the Cape. Because of the canal, Bourne is now considered the "first" town on the Cape, as all three bridges (the Bourne, Sagamore, and the Cape Cod Canal Railroad Bridge) are located within the town. All of Bourne is on Cape Cod, Buzzards Bay and Sagamore Beach being the villages that are on the mainland side with Buttermilk Bay forming the western edge of the peninsula (cape) and the Bourndale Road forming the northern boundary to the cape.

Bourne is the site of the Massachusetts Maritime Academy, a maritime college located at the southern mouth of the canal on the western shore.

Otis Air National Guard Base is partially located in the town. The Air Force Space Command system PAVE PAWS northeast radar is located within Bourne's borders inside Otis Air National Guard Base.

Bourne is home to an archaeological curiosity known as the Bourne Stone, featuring markings whose origin and significance have not been conclusively established.

President Grover Cleveland owned a summer estate in Bourne Village, Gray Gables, that served as the Summer White House from 1893 to 1896. The building was destroyed in a fire in 1973.

On February 5, 2015, Lisa Trubnikova was murdered in her house in Bourne. Her wife Anna was injured, as was a police officer responding to the shooting. In 2017, Adrian Loya was sentenced to life imprisonment without the possibility of parole for first-degree murder.

== Geography ==
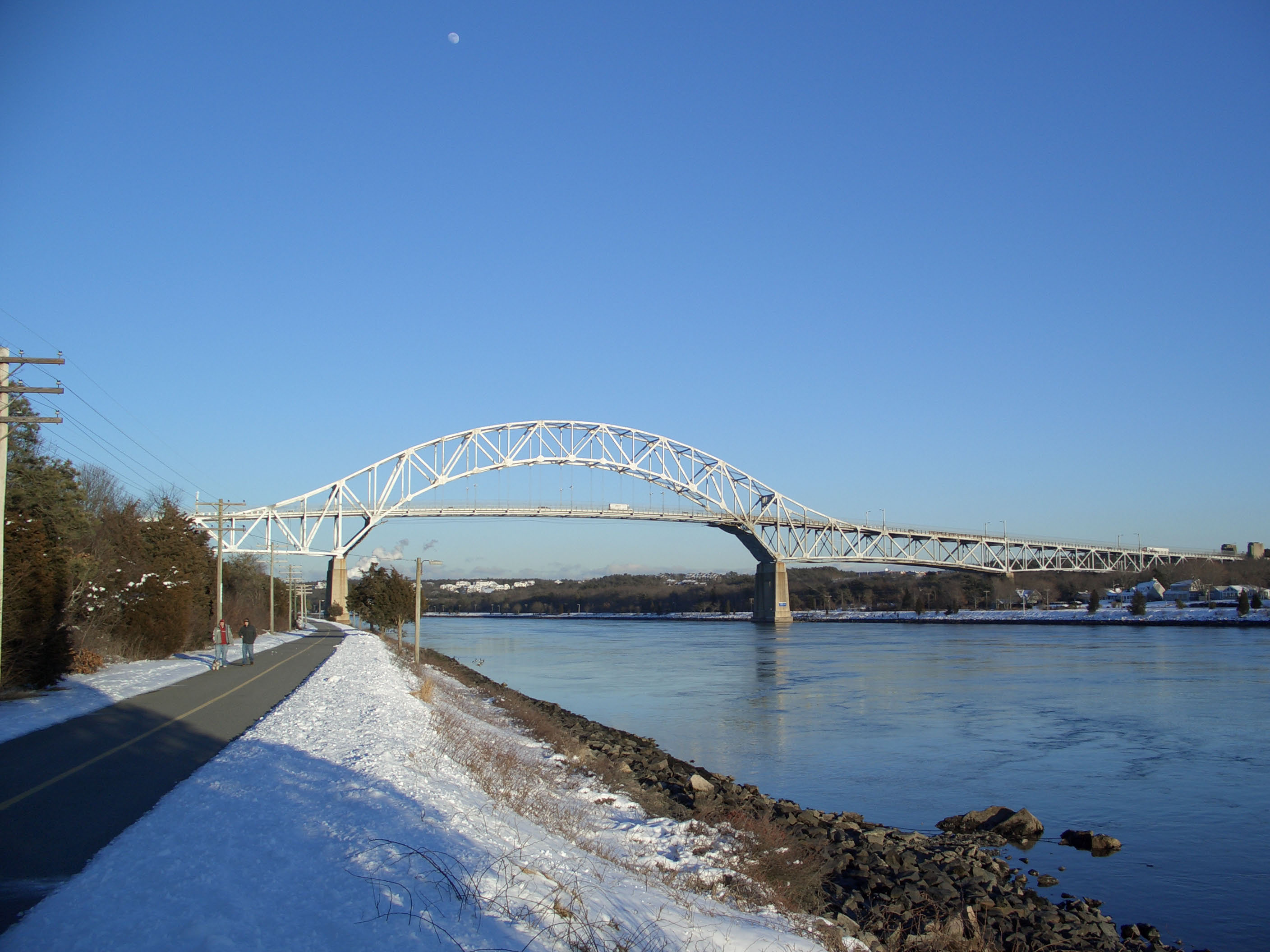
The Bourne Bridge over the Cape Cod Canal

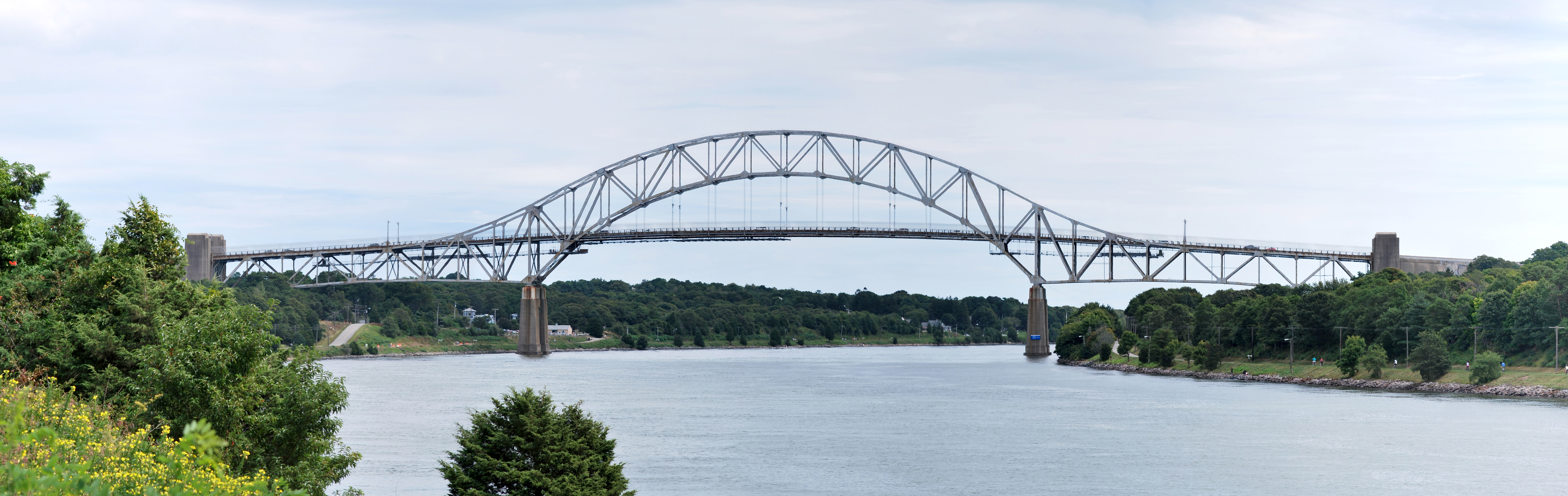
The Sagamore Bridge over the Cape Cod Canal

Bourne is located at the western end of Cape Cod, with the Cape Cod Canal cutting across the northern portion of the town. It is bordered by Sandwich to the east, Falmouth to the south, Marion and Wareham to the west, and Plymouth and Cape Cod Bay to the north. The town lies approximately 20 miles (32 km) west of Barnstable, 55 miles (89 km) south-southeast of Boston, and the same distance east of Providence, Rhode Island. The border with Plymouth and Wareham in Plymouth County constitutes the only landed border between Barnstable County and any other county (the borders with Dukes and Nantucket counties lie in Nantucket Sound). Major localities of Bourne include Bournedale and Buzzards Bay on the west side of the Cape Cod Canal, Sagamore, which straddles the canal, and Bourne village, Monument Beach, Pocasset, and Cataumet on the east side of the canal.

According to the United States Census Bureau, the town has a total area of 52.9 square miles (136.9 km^{2}), of which 40.7 square miles (105.3 km^{2}) is land and 12.2 square miles (31.6 km^{2}), or 23.11%, is water.

Bourne's geography was formed around its location on Buzzards Bay and the Cape Cod Canal. There are several necks (the local term for a peninsula), including Wings Neck and Scraggy Neck, and islands along the shore, which create several small coves and harbors. There are also several small ponds and rivers, all of which (except the Herring River, which feeds directly into the Canal) feed into Buzzards Bay. The largest of these inlets, Buttermilk Bay, lies along the border with Wareham. Because of the large parcel of land occupied by Otis A.N.G.B. in the eastern part of the town, the majority of settlement is either along the shores of the Canal or along Buzzards Bay. There is also a small neighborhood (South Sagamore) located between the Canal and the northern boundaries of the base. Bourne has a town forest and a small portion of the Shawme-Crowell State Forest, which is located along Otis's northern boundary. There are also many beaches along its shores, mostly along Buzzards Bay (although Sagamore Beach lies along Cape Cod Bay).

=== Climate ===
According to the Köppen climate classification system, Bourne, Massachusetts has a warm-summer, wet year round, humid continental climate (Dfb). Dfb climates are characterized by at least one month having an average mean temperature ≤ 32.0 °F (≤ 0.0 °C), at least four months with an average mean temperature ≥ 50.0 °F (≥ 10.0 °C), all months with an average mean temperature ≤ 71.6 °F (≤ 22.0 °C), and no significant precipitation difference between seasons. The average seasonal (Nov–Apr) snowfall total is approximately 30 inches (76 cm). The average snowiest month is February, which corresponds with the annual peak in nor'easter activity. According to the United States Department of Agriculture, the plant hardiness zone is 6b, with an average annual extreme minimum temperature of −1.0 °F (−18.3 °C).

Climate data for Bourne, Barnstable County, Massachusetts (1981–2010 averages)
Month	Jan	Feb	Mar	Apr	May	Jun	Jul	Aug	Sep	Oct	Nov	Dec	Year
Mean daily maximum °F (°C)	37.4 (3.0)	39.3 (4.1)	45.2 (7.3)	54.2 (12.3)	64.2 (17.9)	73.4 (23.0)	79.2 (26.2)	78.3 (25.7)	71.7 (22.1)	61.6 (16.4)	52.8 (11.6)	42.9 (6.1)	58.4 (14.7)
Daily mean °F (°C)	29.2 (−1.6)	31.1 (−0.5)	37.1 (2.8)	45.9 (7.7)	55.6 (13.1)	65.2 (18.4)	71.3 (21.8)	70.4 (21.3)	63.5 (17.5)	53.2 (11.8)	44.5 (6.9)	34.9 (1.6)	50.3 (10.2)
Mean daily minimum °F (°C)	21.0 (−6.1)	22.9 (−5.1)	28.9 (−1.7)	37.7 (3.2)	47.0 (8.3)	57.0 (13.9)	63.4 (17.4)	62.6 (17.0)	55.3 (12.9)	44.7 (7.1)	36.2 (2.3)	26.8 (−2.9)	42.1 (5.6)
Average precipitation inches (mm)	4.11 (104)	3.57 (91)	5.20 (132)	4.50 (114)	3.52 (89)	3.78 (96)	3.35 (85)	3.92 (100)	3.91 (99)	4.23 (107)	4.53 (115)	4.52 (115)	49.14 (1,248)
Average relative humidity (%)	67.6	66.4	64.9	65.8	68.8	72.9	74.0	75.0	75.2	72.3	69.4	68.8	70.1
Average dew point °F (°C)	19.8 (−6.8)	21.2 (−6.0)	26.4 (−3.1)	35.1 (1.7)	45.5 (7.5)	56.3 (13.5)	62.6 (17.0)	62.1 (16.7)	55.5 (13.1)	44.5 (6.9)	35.1 (1.7)	25.7 (−3.5)	40.9 (4.9)
Source: PRISM Climate Group

=== Ecology ===
According to the A. W. Kuchler U.S. Potential natural vegetation Types, Bourne, Massachusetts would primarily contain a Northeastern Oak/Pine (110) vegetation type with a Southern Mixed Forest (26) vegetation form.

== Demographics ==
Historical population
Year	Pop.	±%
1890	1,442	—
1900	1,657	+14.9%
1910	2,474	+49.3%
1920	2,530	+2.3%
1930	2,895	+14.4%
1940	3,315	+14.5%
1950	4,720	+42.4%
1960	14,011	+196.8%
1970	12,636	−9.8%
1980	13,874	+9.8%
1990	16,064	+15.8%
2000	18,721	+16.5%
2010	19,754	+5.5%
2020	20,452	+3.5%
2024*	20,508	+0.3%
* = population estimate. Source: United States Census records and Population Estimates Program data.

As of the census of 2000, there were 18,721 people, 7,439 households, and 5,013 families residing in the town. The population density was 457.6 inhabitants per square mile (176.7/km^{2}). There were 9,648 housing units at an average density of 235.8 per square mile (91.0/km^{2}). The racial makeup of the town was 97.72% White, 0.39% Black or African American, 0.53% Native American, 0.71% Asian, 0.01% Pacific Islander, 0.99% from other races, and 0.65% from two or more races. Hispanic or Latino of any race were 0.46% of the population.

There were 7,439 households, out of which 28.2% had children under the age of 18 living with them, 77.6% were married couples living together, 5.4% had a female householder with no husband present, and 22.6% were non-families. 26.8% of all households were made up of individuals, and 11.8% had someone living alone who was 65 years of age or older. The average household size was 2.39 and the average family size was 2.90.

In the town, the population was spread out, with 21.9% under the age of 18, 9.4% from 18 to 24, 27.3% from 25 to 44, 23.8% from 45 to 64, and 17.6% who were 65 years of age or older. The median age was 39 years. For every 100 females, there were 97.1 males. For every 100 females age 18 and over, there were 95.9 males.

The median income for a household in the town was $92,216, and the median income for a family was $118,321. The per capita income for the town was $64,012.

== Government ==
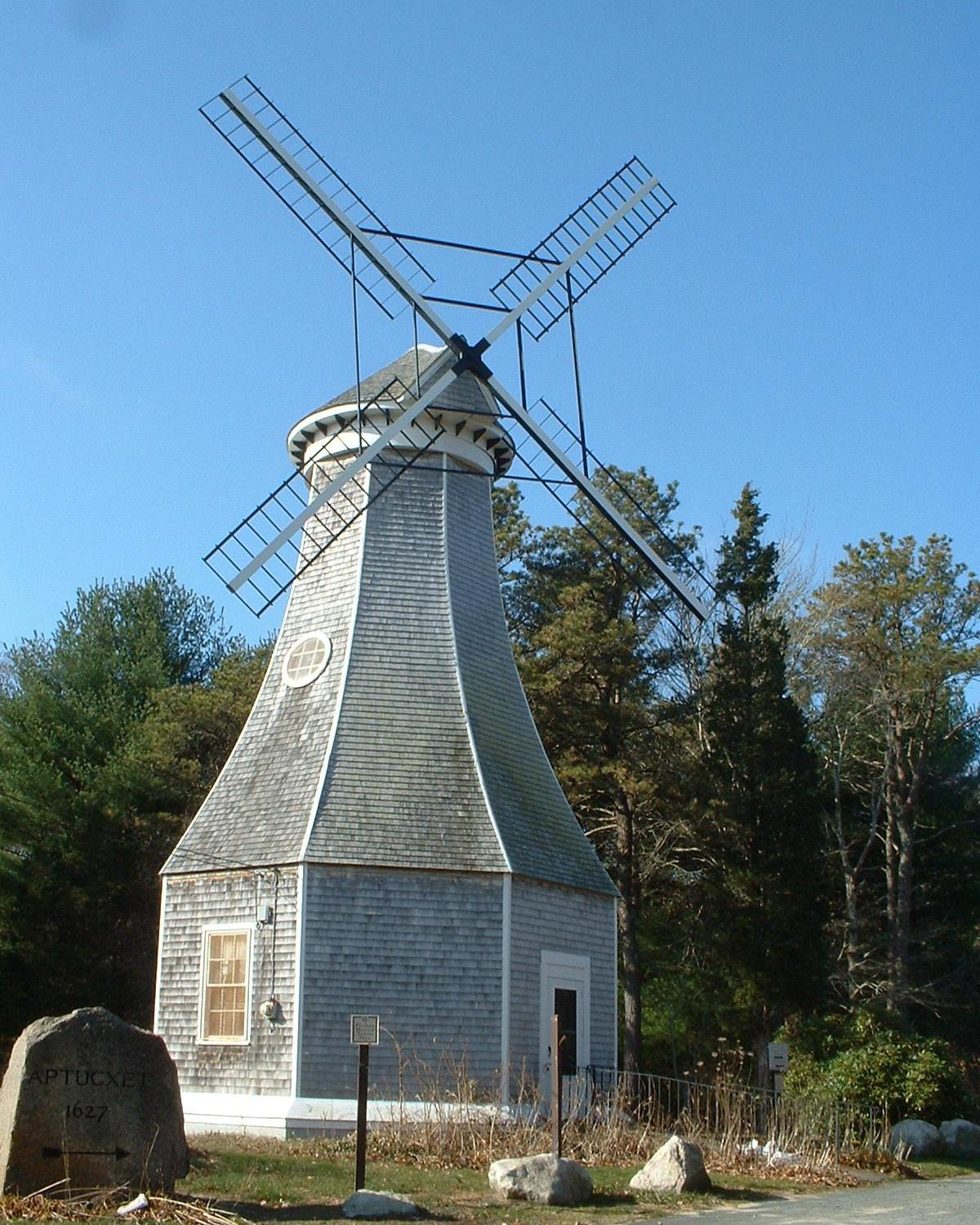
The windmill at the Aptucxet Trading Post

Bourne is represented in the Massachusetts House of Representatives as a part of three separate districts, the Second Plymouth, Fifth Barnstable, and a third district which includes portions of Falmouth and Mashpee. The town is represented in the Massachusetts Senate as a part of the Plymouth and Barnstable district, which includes Falmouth, Kingston, Pembroke, Plymouth, Plympton, Sandwich, and portions of Barnstable. The town is home to the Seventh Barracks of Troop D of the Massachusetts State Police.

On the national level, Bourne is a part of Massachusetts's 9th congressional district, and is currently represented by Bill Keating. The state's senior (Class I) member of the United States Senate, elected in 2012, is Elizabeth Warren. The junior (Class II) senator, Edward Markey, was elected in 2013.

The town uses the open town meeting form of government, which is led by a board of selectmen. Members of the Board of Selectmen are Mary Jane Mastrangelo – Chair, Melissa A Ferretti – Vice Chair, Jeanne Azarovitz – Clerk, Peter J Meier – Senior Tenured Member, and Anne Marie Siroonian. The town hall, like the police station, lies on the mainland side of the Canal. There are four fire stations located throughout the town, and seven post offices for the town's eight ZIP codes. The town's Jonathan Bourne Public Library is located near the Aptucxet Trading Post, just south of the Bourne Bridge, and is a member of the Cape Libraries Automated Materials Sharing (CLAMS) library network.

Voter Registration and Party Enrollment as of October 24, 2020
Party	Number of Voters	Percentage
Democratic	3,007	35%
Republican	2,195	23%
Unenrolled	9,770	42%
Libertarian	76	0%
Total	15,223	100%

== Education ==
Bourne operates its own school department, with four public schools in the town. There are two elementary schools, Bourne Intermediate School, and Bournedale Elementary School. Bournedale serve grades kindergarten through second, Bourne Intermediate School Serves grades three through five. The town's middle school serves grades sixth through eight, and Bourne High School operates grades nine through twelve. The school's colors are purple and white, and their teams are the Canalmen and Lady Canalmen. Their logo includes the Railroad Bridge, one of the three bridges crossing the Cape Cod Canal, and the only one that looks different from the other two. Bourne's chief rival is Wareham High School.

In the fall of 2009, Bournedale Elementary School opened, closing Otis Memorial Elementary and Ella F. Hoxie School.

Bourne High School's sports teams include the Boy's Hockey team with the following all time stats as of 2026: Bourne Canalmen Overall record (1963-2019): 699-417-101, 2004 Massachusetts State Champions, 2003 & 1990 Eastern Massachusetts Champions, Southeastern Massachusetts Div 2 Champions:1977,78,83,84, South Coast Conference Champions 1986,87,89,90,91,93,96,97, 2000,01,02,03,04,05,06,08,09,10,11,12,15,19.

State finalists include girls volleyball, golf, and boys soccer. Conference championships have been won by boys tennis, soccer, and football. The baseball team, in the 2007 MIAA State Tournament, lost to Cape-rival Harwich in the South Finals.

Additionally, Bourne is home to the Upper Cape Cod Regional Technical School, located off Sandwich Road. The school serves Bourne, Falmouth and Sandwich on the Cape, as well as Wareham and Marion (off Cape). The town also has a private school: The Bridgeview School in Sagamore, a private Montessori school serving Pre-K through 6th grades. It formerly had the Waldorf School of Cape Cod, which was a Waldorf school located just south of the Bourne Bridge, serving grades Pre-K through 8. It since has moved to Cotuit, followed by a move to Sandwich, where it serves a smaller range of students.

Area Catholic schools of the Roman Catholic Diocese of Fall River include: St. Francis Xavier School in Acushnet, St. Joseph School in Fairhaven, and St. Pius X School in South Yarmouth. Previously Buzzards Bay had its own Catholic grade school, St. Margaret Primary School, which closed in 2020 in the wake of the COVID-19 pandemic. St. Francis Xavier, St. Joseph, and St. Pius X took former St. Margaret students.

The Massachusetts Maritime Academy, a state maritime college, is also located in Buzzards Bay at the western mouth of the Cape Cod Canal.

== Sports ==
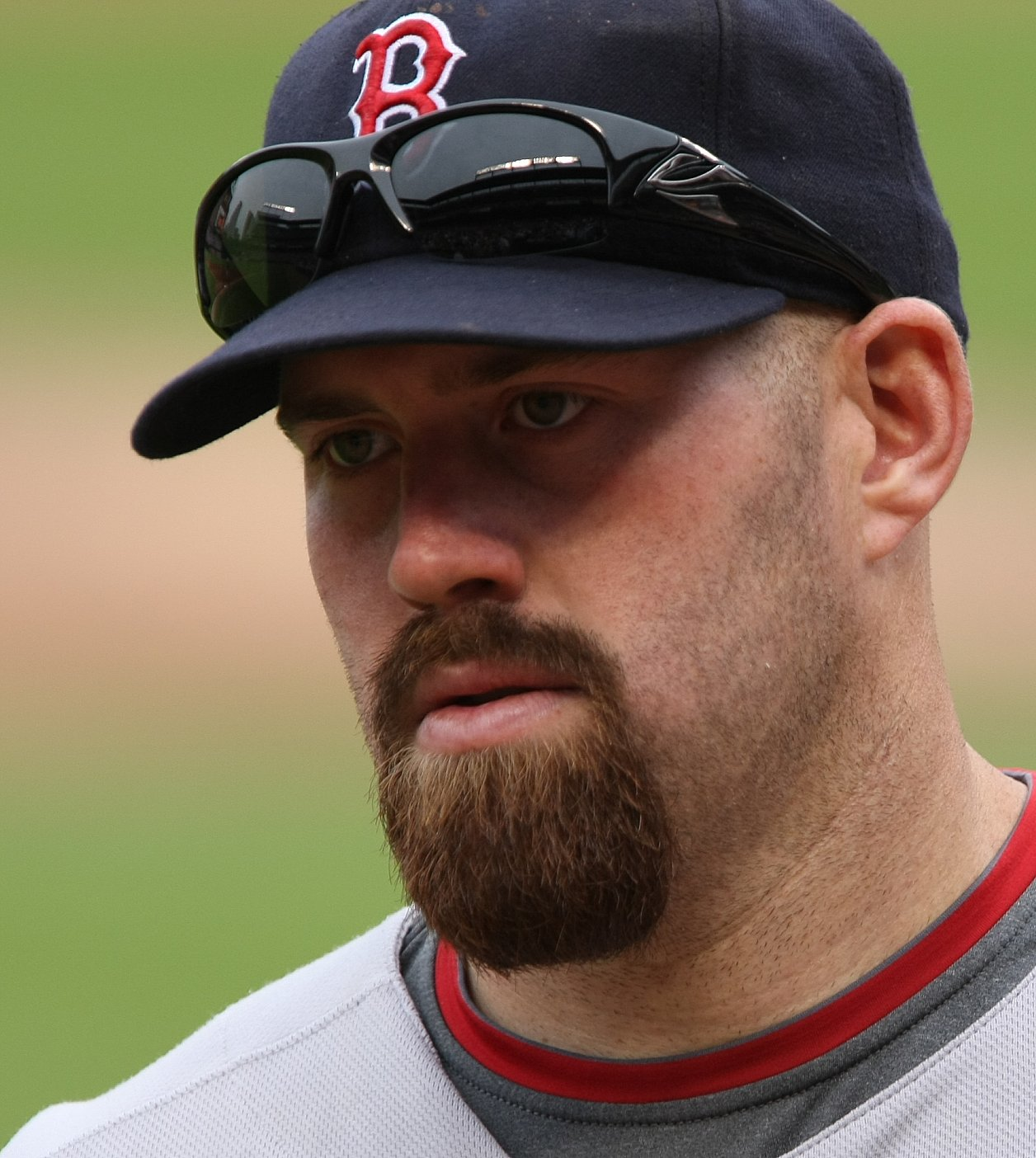
Kevin Youkilis played for the Bourne Braves in 2000.

Bourne is home to the Bourne Braves, an amateur collegiate summer baseball team in the Cape Cod Baseball League. The team plays at Doran Park, and has featured dozens of players who went on to have careers in Major League Baseball, such as Kevin Youkilis, Mitch Moreland, and Pete Alonso.

A New England Football League team, the South Shore Outlaws, were formerly located in Bourne.

== Transportation ==
=== Roadways ===
The largest highways in Bourne are Massachusetts Route 3, U.S. Route 6, Massachusetts Route 25 and Massachusetts Route 28. Routes 6 and 28 enter the town concurrently from Wareham, bypassing Buzzards Bay to the north. At the Buzzards Bay Rotary, the two routes split. Route 6 goes straight ahead and assumes its old alignment as a four-lane highway along the north side of the Cape Cod Canal, going through the village of Bournedale before becoming the Mid-Cape Highway, a four-lane limited-access highway beginning at the western approach to the Sagamore Bridge. Sandwich Road, the road perpendicular to Route 6 running along the south side of the canal, was formerly signed as Route 6W. Currently it is an unsigned two-lane state highway that is used as an alternative to Route 6. Sandwich Road becomes Massachusetts Route 6A east of the intersection with Cranberry Highway, a road that acts as a connector between Route 6A and Route 6 eastbound prior to the approach of the Sagamore Bridge. Route 28 splits off at the Buzzards Bay Rotary as a ramp headed to the Bourne Bridge and Route 25. Route 25's terminus is just prior to the northern approach of the Bourne Bridge where the highway continues as Route 28 south. At the southern end of the bridge is the Bourne Rotary, where Sandwich Road intersects. Route 28 continues past the rotary as a four-lane divided highway, officially known as McArthur Boulevard. At the Otis Rotary, the intersection with the road leading to the main gate to Otis Air Force Base, Route 28A spurs off and heads towards Woods Hole in Falmouth. It is at this point that the highway goes from being a surface road to a true limited-access highway. Route 3, also known as the Pilgrims Highway, ends at the junction of Route 6, just prior to the Sagamore Bridge. Up until 2006, the intersection was a rotary, which caused daily traffic nightmares during the busy summer tourist season. The rotary was removed in 2007.

=== Rail ===
The third bridge over the Canal is the Cape Cod Canal Railroad Bridge, a vertical lift bridge. Freight rail service is provided by the Massachusetts Coastal Railroad. The town is part of the MBTA district and is directly served by the seasonal CapeFlyer at Buzzards Bay station and Bourne station. The closest MBTA Commuter Rail stations are Middleborough and Kingston. The nearest inter-city (Amtrak) passenger rail stations are Boston's South Station and Providence. The Cape Cod Central Railroad operates seasonal tourist excursions from Hyannis to Sagamore, with occasional special excursions to Buzzards Bay village.

=== Air ===
There are no public air facilities in town; the town is roughly equidistant between the Plymouth and Barnstable municipal airports. The nearest national and international airports are Logan International Airport in Boston and T. F. Green Airport outside Providence.

== Notable people ==
- Sammy Adams, rapper, singer and songwriter
- Bill Arnold, NHL player
- Mark Fayne, NHL player
- Peter Gammons, sportswriter
- Bill Keating, member of the U.S. House of Representatives
- Bobby Orr, NHL defenseman who played on two Stanley Cup-winning teams and is a member of the Hockey Hall of Fame
- T. K. O'Ryan, professional wrestler
- Bob Perryman, football player
- Dan Shaughnessy, sportswriter
- Mike Stud, hip-hop recording artist

== See also ==
- National Marine Life Center
