= Town Hall Square Historic District =

Historic district in Massachusetts, United States

- U.S. National Register of Historic Places
- U.S. Historic district
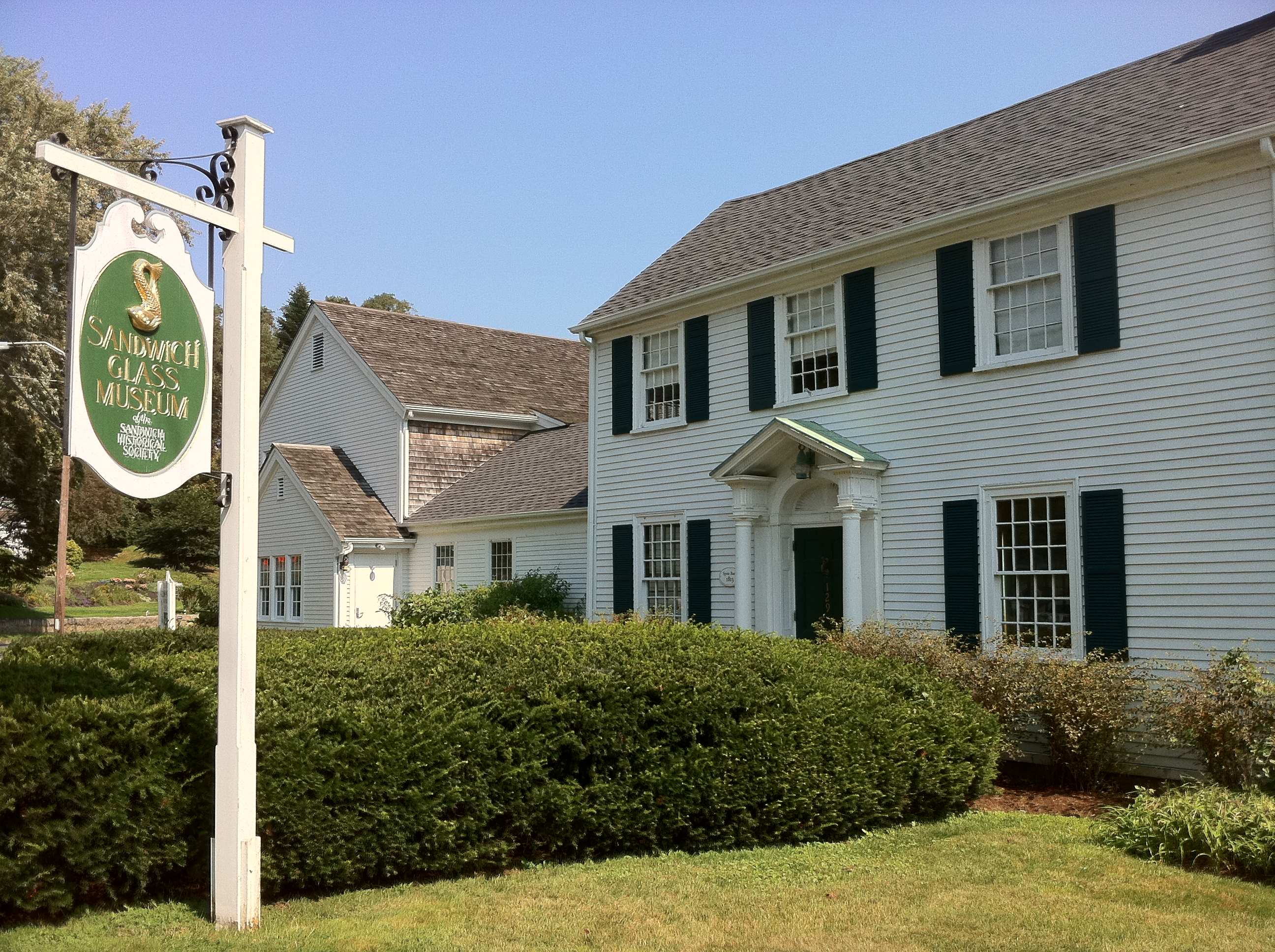
- Glass Museum

- Location within Cape Cod Location within Massachusetts Location within the United States
- Location: Sandwich, Massachusetts
- Coordinates: 41°45′29″N 70°30′4″W
- Area: 220 acres (89 ha)
- Built: 1634
- Architectural style: Greek Revival, Colonial, Georgian
- NRHP reference No.: 75001914 (original); 10000752 (increase)

Significant dates
- Added to NRHP: October 31, 1975
- Boundary increase: September 16, 2010

The Town Hall Square Historic District is a historic district encompassing the center of Sandwich, Massachusetts. The original 54-acre (22 ha) district was visually centered on Sandwich Town Hall, Shawme Pond, and the reconstructed Dexter Grist Mill. When first listed on the National Register of Historic Places in 1975, it was roughly bounded by Main, Grove, Water Sts., and Tupper Rd. from Beale Ave. to MA 6A. In 2010 the district was expanded, adding another 170 acres (69 ha) and more than 150 contributing resources.

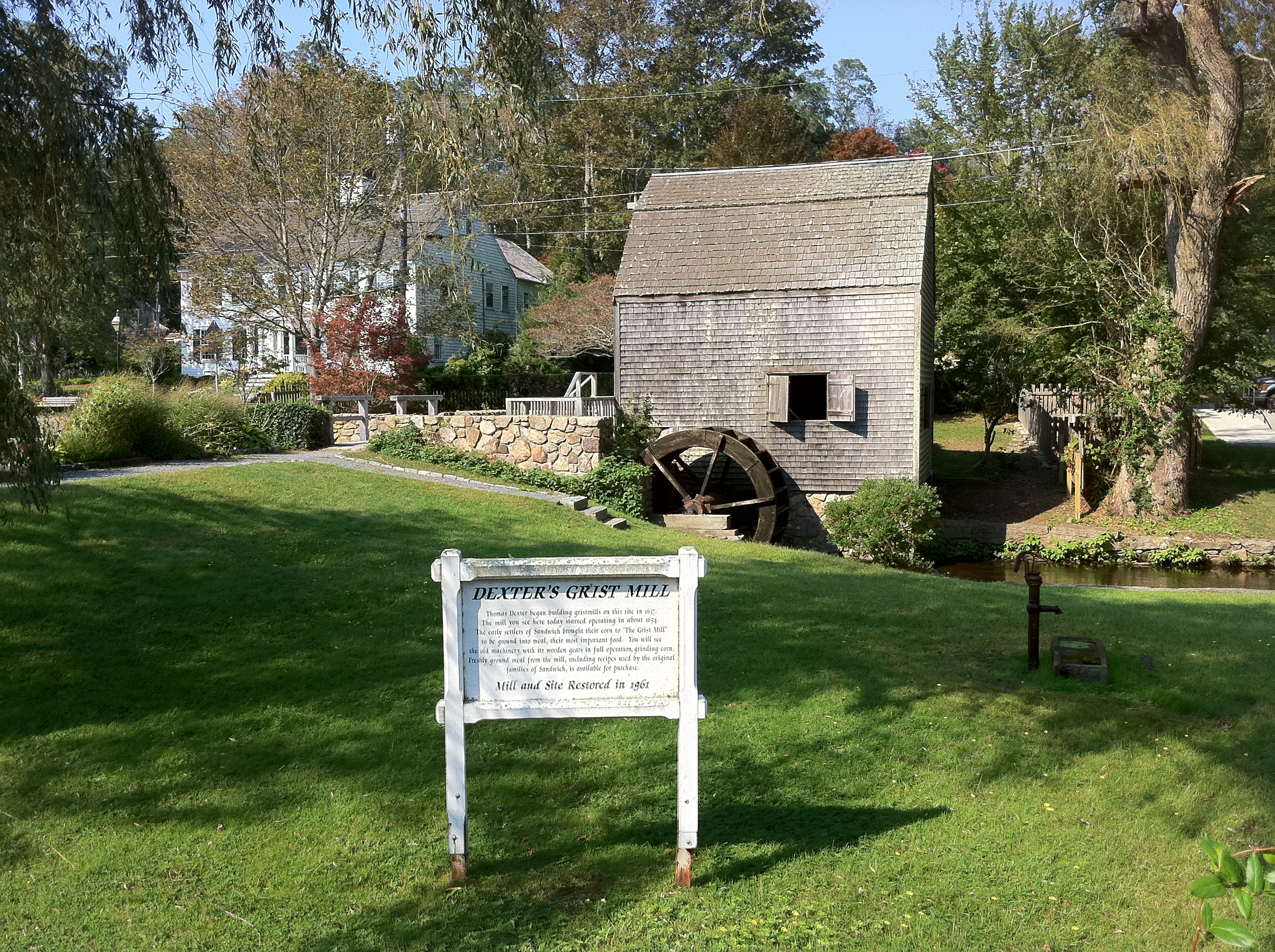
The grist mill

The Town Hall Square area of Sandwich has been an important civic location since the town was established in 1637. Early in its history the dike was built which impounds Shawme Pond, and a grist mill was established there. It remained an agrarian community, due in part to the lack of a good harbor, until 1825, when glassmaking began to develop as an industry. Two important civic buildings, the town hall, and the First Church of Christ, were built in 1837 and 1847, during this period of prosperity, but many older buildings including several First Period houses from the 17th century, also survive in the area. Most of the properties in the district were built after American independence and before 1850.

The expanded district also includes a number of houses from the second half of the 19th century, including several Queen Anne and Shingle style homes. There are four cemeteries in the district, including the original burying ground, whose oldest grave dates to 1663. There are four churches and two schools in the district, including the 1928 Henry T. Wing School at 35 Water Street, which is the largest building in the district.

== See also ==
- National Register of Historic Places listings in Barnstable County, Massachusetts
