= Forestdale, Massachusetts =

- Census-designated place
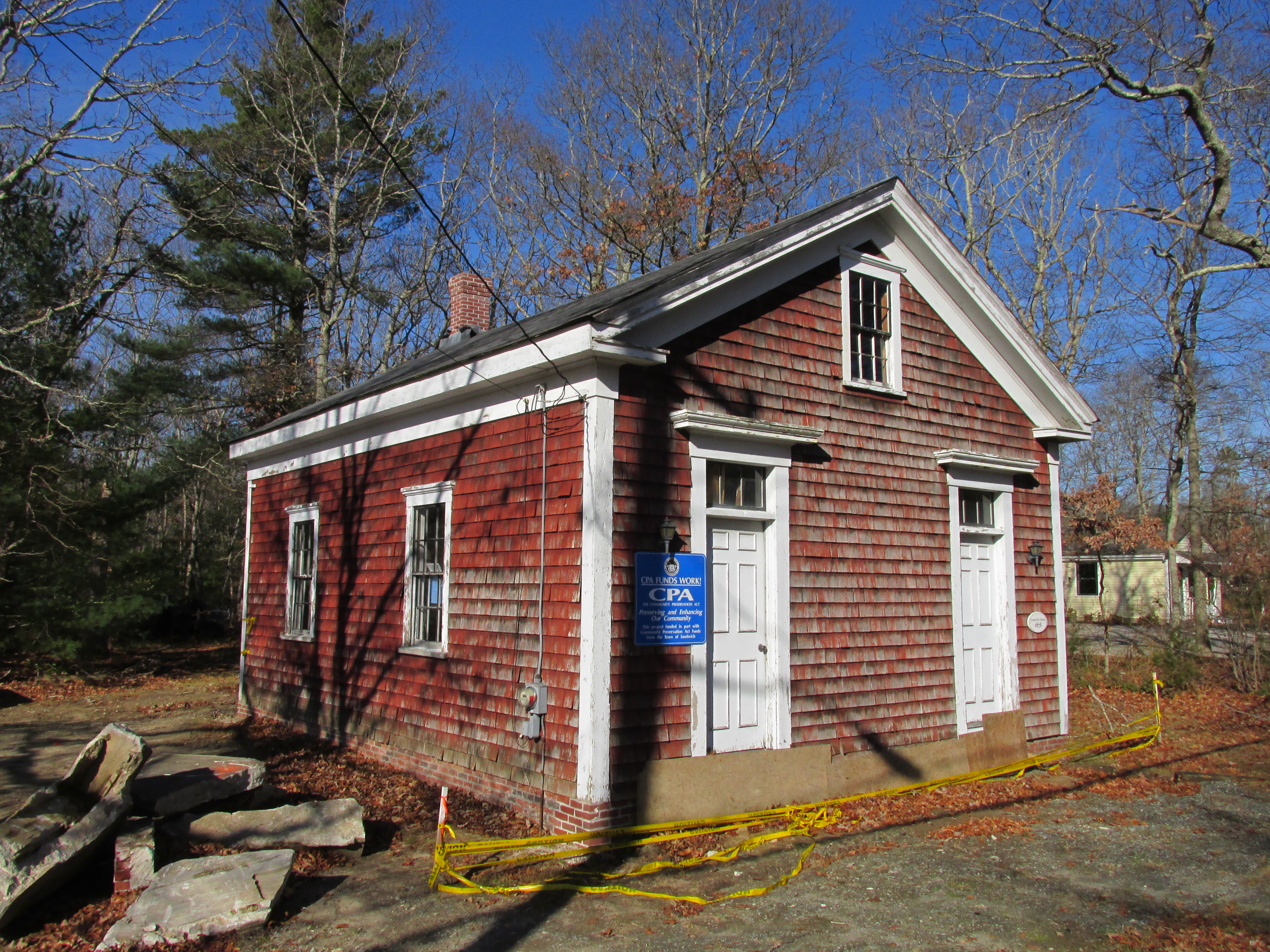
- Greenville School

- Location in Barnstable County and the state of Massachusetts.
- Coordinates: 41°41′0″N 70°30′44″W
- Country: United States
- State: Massachusetts
- County: Barnstable
- Town: Sandwich

Area
  - Total: 4.18 sq mi (10.82 km^{2})
  - Land: 3.81 sq mi (9.88 km^{2})
  - Water: 0.36 sq mi (0.94 km^{2})
- Elevation: 160 ft (50 m)

Population (2020)
  - Total: 4,116
  - Density: 1,079.2/sq mi (416.68/km^{2})
- Time zone: UTC-5 (Eastern (EST))
  - Summer (DST): UTC-4 (EDT)
- ZIP Codes: 02644 (Forestdale); 02563 (Sandwich)
- Area code: 508
- FIPS code: 25-24190
- GNIS feature ID: 0616600

Forestdale is a village and census-designated place (CDP) within the town of Sandwich in Barnstable County, Massachusetts, United States. As of the 2020 census, Forestdale had a population of 4,116. It is the most populous of the three CDPs in Sandwich. The ZIP code of Forestdale is 02644.

== Geography ==
Forestdale is located in the southern part of Sandwich at 41°41′0″N 70°30′44″W (41.683462, -70.512116). It is bordered by the town of Mashpee to the south and by Otis Air National Guard Base to the west. Massachusetts Route 130 (Forestdale Road) is the main route through the community, leading north to Sandwich village and south through Mashpee to Santuit in Barnstable.

According to the United States Census Bureau, the Forestdale CDP has a total area of 4.2 square miles (10.8 km^{2}), of which 3.8 square miles (9.8 km^{2}) is land, and 0.35 square miles (0.9 km^{2}) (8.68%) is water.

== Demographics ==
Historical population
Census	Pop.	Note	%±
2020	4,116		—
U.S. Decennial Census

=== 2020 census ===
As of the 2020 census, Forestdale had a population of 4,116. The median age was 42.5 years. 22.2% of residents were under the age of 18 and 16.3% of residents were 65 years of age or older. For every 100 females there were 95.8 males, and for every 100 females age 18 and over there were 93.1 males age 18 and over.

100.0% of residents lived in urban areas, while 0.0% lived in rural areas.

There were 1,511 households in Forestdale, of which 34.5% had children under the age of 18 living in them. Of all households, 63.1% were married-couple households, 11.6% were households with a male householder and no spouse or partner present, and 19.9% were households with a female householder and no spouse or partner present. About 16.7% of all households were made up of individuals and 7.7% had someone living alone who was 65 years of age or older.

There were 1,606 housing units, of which 5.9% were vacant. The homeowner vacancy rate was 0.5% and the rental vacancy rate was 3.2%.

Racial composition as of the 2020 census
Race	Number	Percent
White	3,675	89.3%
Black or African American	43	1.0%
American Indian and Alaska Native	10	0.2%
Asian	109	2.6%
Native Hawaiian and Other Pacific Islander	0	0.0%
Some other race	49	1.2%
Two or more races	230	5.6%
Hispanic or Latino (of any race)	96	2.3%

=== 2000 census ===
As of the census of 2000, there were 3,992 people, 1,307 households, and 1,049 families residing in the CDP. The population density was 415.5 people/km^{2} (1,076 people/mi^{2}). There were 1,381 housing units at an average density of 143.7 units/km^{2} (372 units/mi^{2}). The racial makeup of the CDP was 96.97% White, 0.85% African American, 0.58% Native American, 0.50% Asian, 0.35% from other races, and 0.75% from two or more races. Hispanic or Latino of any race were 1.28% of the population.

There were 1,307 households, out of which 49.0% had children under the age of 18 living with them, 68.8% were married couples living together, 8.8% had a female householder with no husband present, and 19.7% were non-families. 14.7% of all households were made up of individuals, and 5.4% had someone living alone who was 65 years of age or older. The average household size was 3.05 and the average family size was 3.42.

In the CDP, the population was spread out, with 33.8% under the age of 18, 5.0% from 18 to 24, 32.1% from 25 to 44, 21.3% from 45 to 64, and 7.9% who were 65 years of age or older. The median age was 34 years. For every 100 females, there were 100.1 males. For every 100 females age 18 and over, there were 93.0 males.

The median income for a household in the CDP was $62,072, and the median income for a family was $65,723. Males had a median income of $46,513 versus $29,271 for females. The per capita income for the CDP was $24,072. About 1.9% of families and 2.1% of the population were below the poverty line, including 1.5% of those under age 18 and 12.0% of those age 65 or over.
