= Peter Peltz =

American artist (1915–2001)

- Born: Philip Peltz; 1915; Albany, New York
- Died: March 20, 2001 (86); Morrisville, Vermont
- Education: Yale University
- Known for: Painted wood carvings of birds
- Movement: Folk art
- Spouse: Elizabeth (nee Hooper)
- Patrons: Jacqueline Kennedy

Philip "Peter" Peltz (1915 – March 20, 2001) was an American artist, active in Sandwich on Cape Cod, Massachusetts. He was known for his wooden, painted carvings of birds mounted on driftwood.

== Life and work ==
Peltz was born in Albany, New York in 1915. He attended the Hotchkiss School, and graduated from Yale University in 1938, later returning to Yale to earn a Master of Arts degree in history. During his time at the university, Peltz was a member of the Whiffenpoofs singing group. Peltz served in the US Navy during World War II, in both the Mediterranean and Pacific theaters, rising to the rank of lieutenant. It was during his time in the navy that he carved his first bird.

After leaving the Navy, Peltz married and had two children. In 1952, Peltz and his family moved to East Sandwich. In 1958 Peltz had a barn moved from Falmouth, Massachusetts to East Sandwich, where he began to carve and sell his birds, nicknaming the structure "The Bird Barn." On March 20, 2001, Peltz died in Morrisville, Vermont, at the age of 86.

Peltz's work was notably featured in the Oval Office during John F. Kennedy's presidency; the piece was a carved tern given to the President by his wife Jacqueline Kennedy, who was known to have personally owned at least three of Peltz's pieces. In total, Peltz is believed to have crafted thousands of birds, and his works continue to regularly come up at auction, generally selling between $100-$200. Due to the large number of pieces, the quality of Peltz's work varies from very fine, detailed sculptures which capture the shape and posture of the birds to those with less attention to detail, and "fastness of color." Peltz carved and painted a variety of birds, from waterfowl to birds of prey, with most of his subjects being species present in New England. Peltz's sculptures of smaller birds such as songbirds were generally life-sized, while his carvings of larger birds were scaled down.
