= First Church (Sandwich, Massachusetts) =

- First Church of Christ
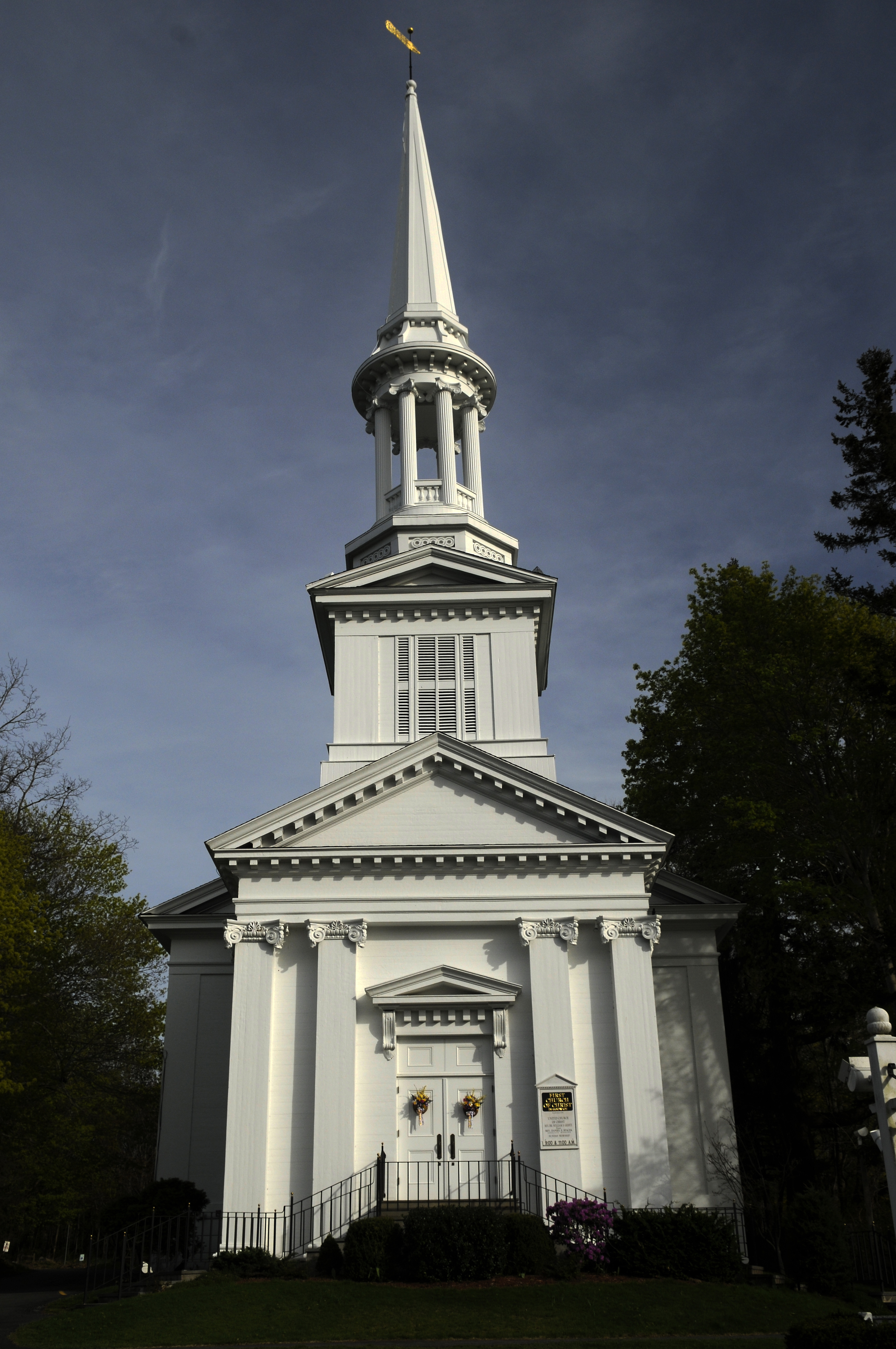
- First Church's Current Facility, est. 1848
- First Church
- 41°45′28″N 70°29′58″W
- Location: Sandwich, Massachusetts
- Country: USA
- Denomination: United Church of Christ
- Website: firstchurchsandwich.org

History
- Status: Active
- Founded: 1638

Architecture
- Heritage designation: Part of Town Hall Square Historic District
- Designated: 1975
- Architect: Isaac Melvin

Clergy
- Pastor: Rev. Tina Walker-Morin

First Church UCC (or "First Church," or "First Church Sandwich," or "First Church of Christ") is a member of the United Church of Christ located in Sandwich, Massachusetts founded in 1638 under Plymouth Colony Charter and the Mayflower Compact. It is either the oldest church on Cape Cod or the second oldest depending on the interpretation. First Church boasts Mayflower Pilgrims and their first-generation descendants as charter members. By Plymouth Colony Charter, a church was required as an official part of the governance of any newly founded township, and First Church was founded as the official church within the town of Sandwich. First Church is now a congregation of the United Church of Christ, a large theologically and socially liberal denomination. The church is open and affirming – an appellation signifying both openness to and active affirmation of all persons regardless of status (and including LGBTQI persons). First Church is well known to tourists because of the inclusion of its current steeple on the cover of Elvis Presley's How Great Thou Art gospel album.

== Age controversy ==
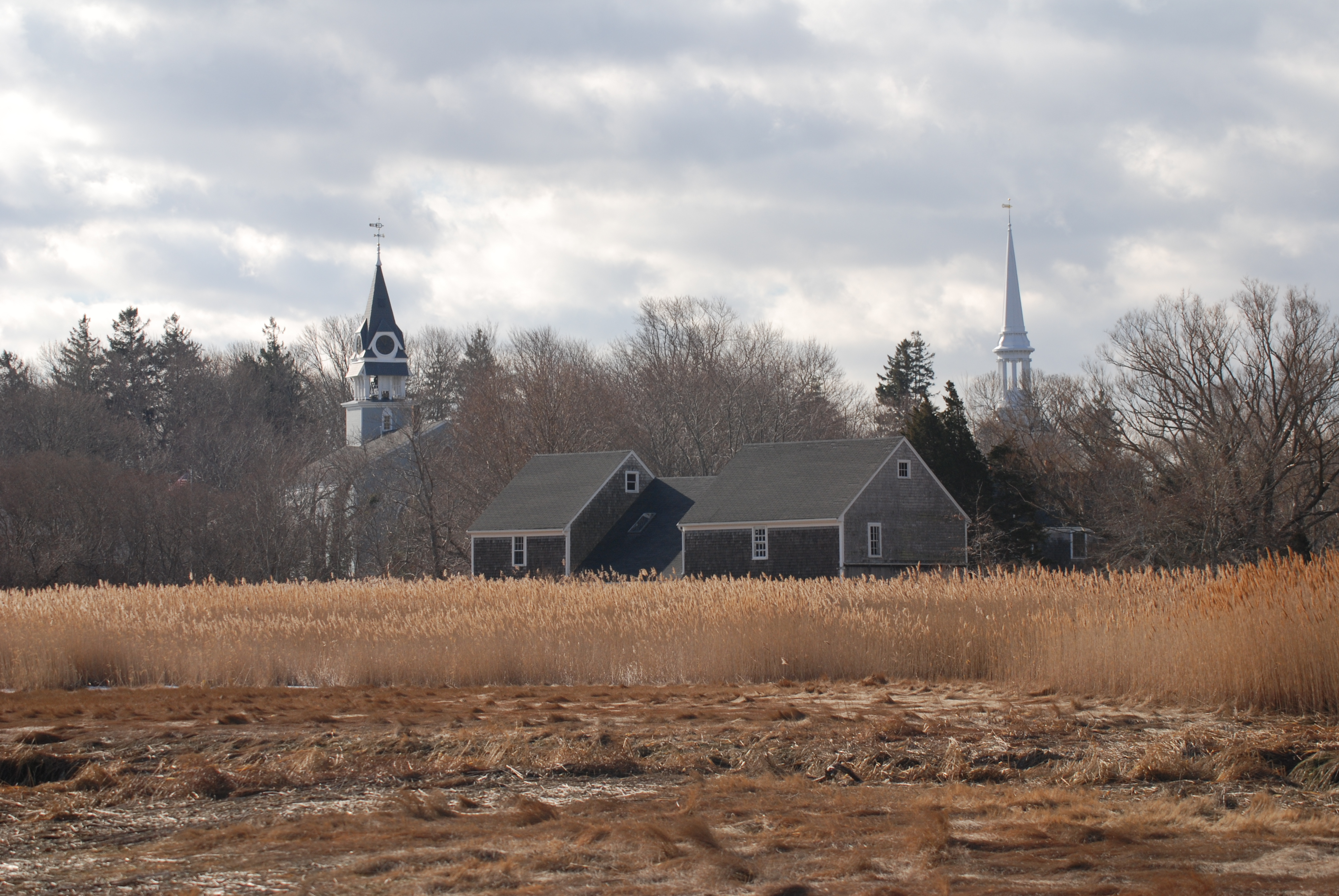
A view across the salt marsh of First Church's current spire, on the right, and the steeple of one of First Church's former facilities on the left. The steeple on the left is the original home to the Titus Winchester clock. It later became the home for the Sandwich Doll Museum, and is now a private residence.

Because it was established in England and then moved as an existing congregation to the colonies, West Parish UCC in West Barnstable, MA is twenty-three years older than First Church. By oral tradition, this move was a few months after the founding of First Church. Therefore, West Parish, unlike First Church, was not originally established under a Plymouth Colony charter and may not have been an "American" church until after the founding of First Church.

== Theological distinctness ==
=== Anteoriginalism ===
First Church believes that it has had unbroken democratic Congregational polity since its founding, and is, therefore, one of the very few oldest surviving Western democratic institutions in the world. An influential minority of the church membership believes that the United States model of democracy, particularly the roles, structures, and substructures of the Legislative branch of government, and its interaction with the Executive branch, are derived directly from the democratic Congregational church polity of the early Puritans rather than the Ancient Greek and Roman sources cited later by the Founding Fathers. This motivates an Anteoriginalist theological justification for liberal social action since First Church can claim to be an American democratic institution unstained by the sins of Native American Genocide and American Black Slavery. The historical validity of this belief is difficult to verify, but First Church does predate the Declaration of Independence by 137 years, and Jeffersonian Democracy by at least 150 years.

=== Liberal Christian theology ===
First Church is a theologically liberal and inclusive Christian Church that bases its teachings primarily on the Christian Bible, but the congregation considers all faiths that validate social justice, love, kindness, and interpersonal and intercommunity reconciliation to be valid expressions of an eternal, soteriologically potent, and pure spirituality.

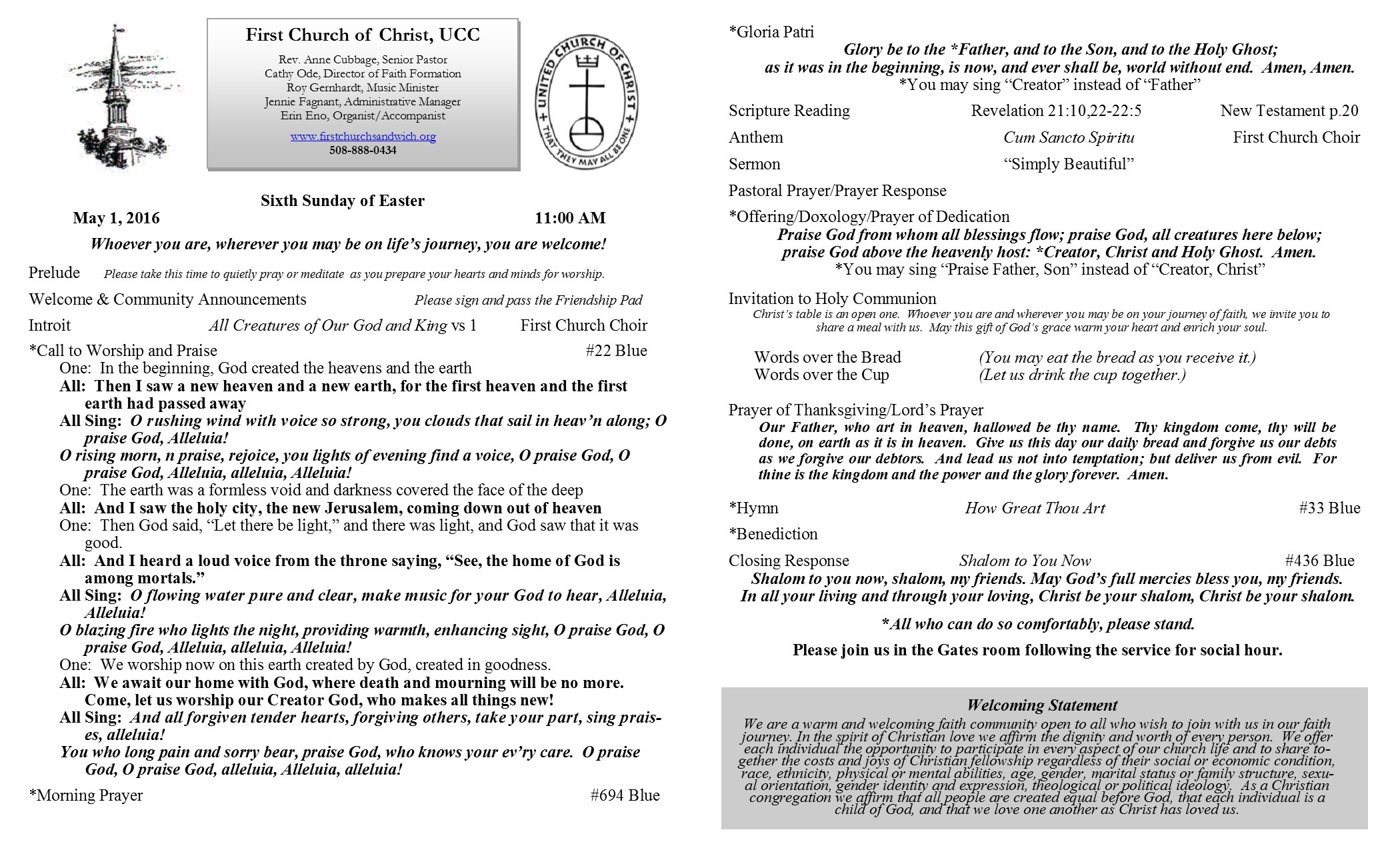
May 1st 2016 First Church 11:00 Service Bulletin. Note the alternate ungendered texts for the Gloria Patri and Doxology.

The existence of an ungendered Godhead is mostly agreed upon by the church membership. Although many of the church members do not refer to God using feminine or neuter pronouns, this may be based on a desire to use familiar and traditional forms of address for the Divine, rather than a commitment to a gendered Godhead. Optional gendered and ungendered texts for responsive readings and sung liturgical components are often included in the church service bulletins.

In defense of the church's feminist activism and Open and Affirming stance on LGBTQI issues, narrowly heterosexual, cisgendered, and androcentric readings of the bible are generally dealt with in one of three main ways:

1. They are considered biased readings and therefore aberrant.
2. The relevant passages are artifacts of their sitzimleben, or social milieu.
3. The teachings are present in the scriptures, but are considered relatively unimportant in regards to the message of the scripture as a whole.

Because of the extreme diversity of views held by members of First Church, there is no consensus on any of these three interpretive approaches, but there is consensus that at least one of the three must be correct, and the church, therefore, acts upon that consensus.

=== Theological diversity ===
First Church has historically espoused a number of doctrines, and the membership currently maintains a flexibility with doctrines that have been historically divisive within and among Christian churches, Members with opposing views typically coexist without argument. Some examples of this diversity currently exhibited by First Church membership include:

- High and Low Christology,
- High and Low views of Scriptural Authority,
- Calvinism vs Arminianism,
- Child Baptism vs Believer's Baptism,
- High and Low views of Communion,
- Cessationism, Dispensationalism, and Pentecostalism,
- Trinitarian vs Unitarian views of the Godhead.

== Church polity ==
First Church was founded as the seat of government for the town of Sandwich, MA.

In the colonies of Massachusetts only "freemen" who also owned land were allowed to vote. But the word "freeman" had a special meaning. It meant a man in good standing with the membership of the local Puritan (Congregational) Church. A young man or a new settler had to prove his interest and support of the town and the church first. Only then was he accepted by the others as a "freeman." So the church controlled the government, as well as the religion, in the early days of Sandwich.

The church is governed by the laity through a Church Council and committee system analogous to the legislative branch of the US Government, with staff acting as the executive branch... but ideally without the rancor associated with national politics. There is often rancor in practice. Lack of rancor, mutual prayerful support, and unity of vision between staff and committees are all repeatedly affirmed in the church by-laws.

== Facility ==
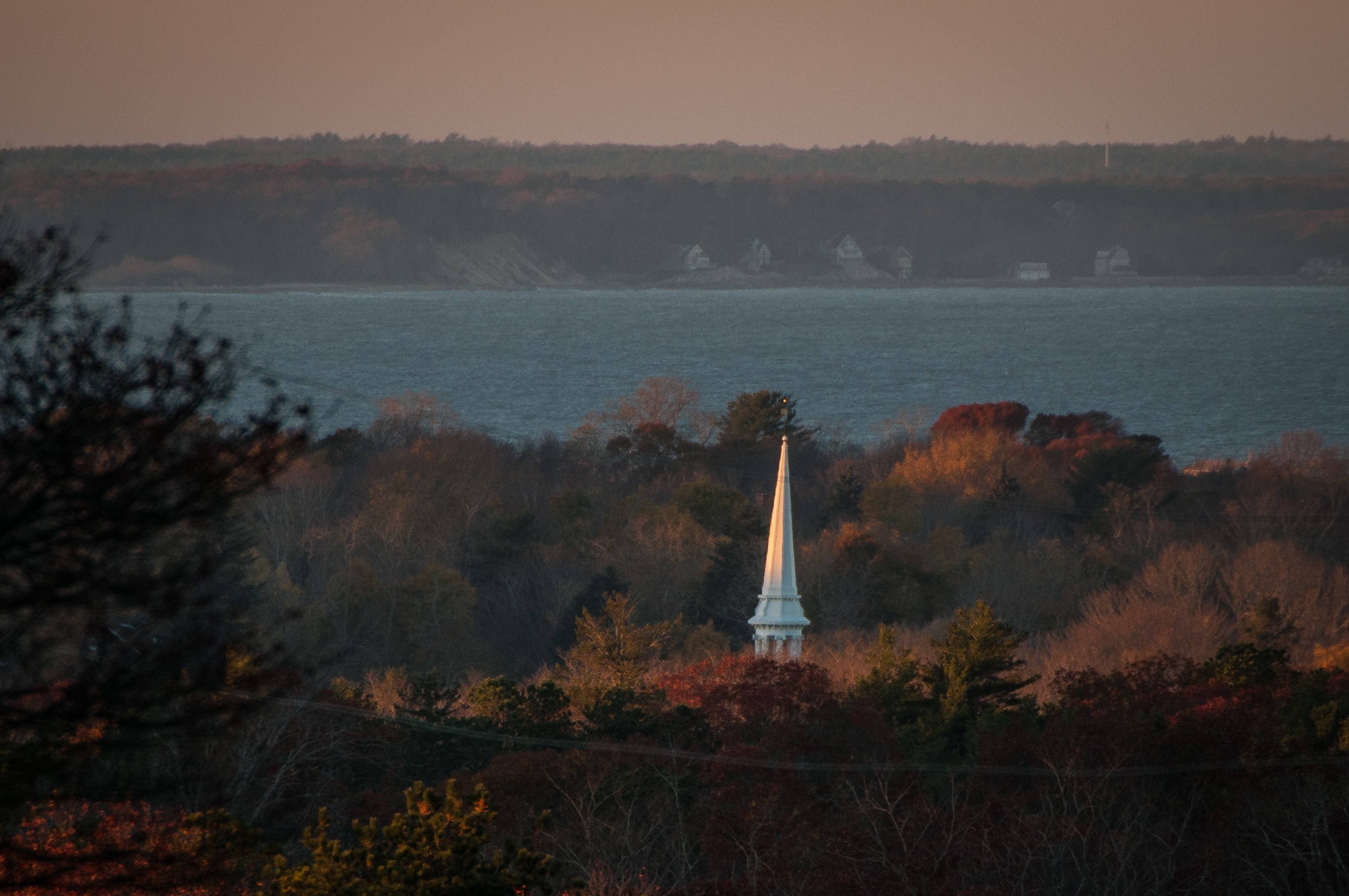
Spire of First Church with Cape Cod Bay in the background

The Church's current facility was initially constructed in 1848 and was designed by Isaac Melvin of Cambridgeport. It is known locally as the "Christopher Wren" church due to the fact that its architecture is inspired by the work of Christopher Wren such as St. James Piccadilly. The spire atop the bell tower was included in the cover art for Elvis Presley's 1967 How Great Thou Art gospel album, and the church has been a pilgrimage site for devoted Elvis fans since. The spire is also known throughout the area as a daylight navigation aid to shipping and recreational boating in Cape Cod Bay, as well as to surface traffic throughout town since the spire has line-of-sight to the surface for many miles.

Due to the church spire's large line-of-sight area, Verizon Wireless has contracted with First Church to install a cellular antenna within the spire without altering the historical appearance of the building. Construction on the new antenna is set to begin in late 2016 or early 2017.

== 1847 E. & G.G. Hook Organ ==
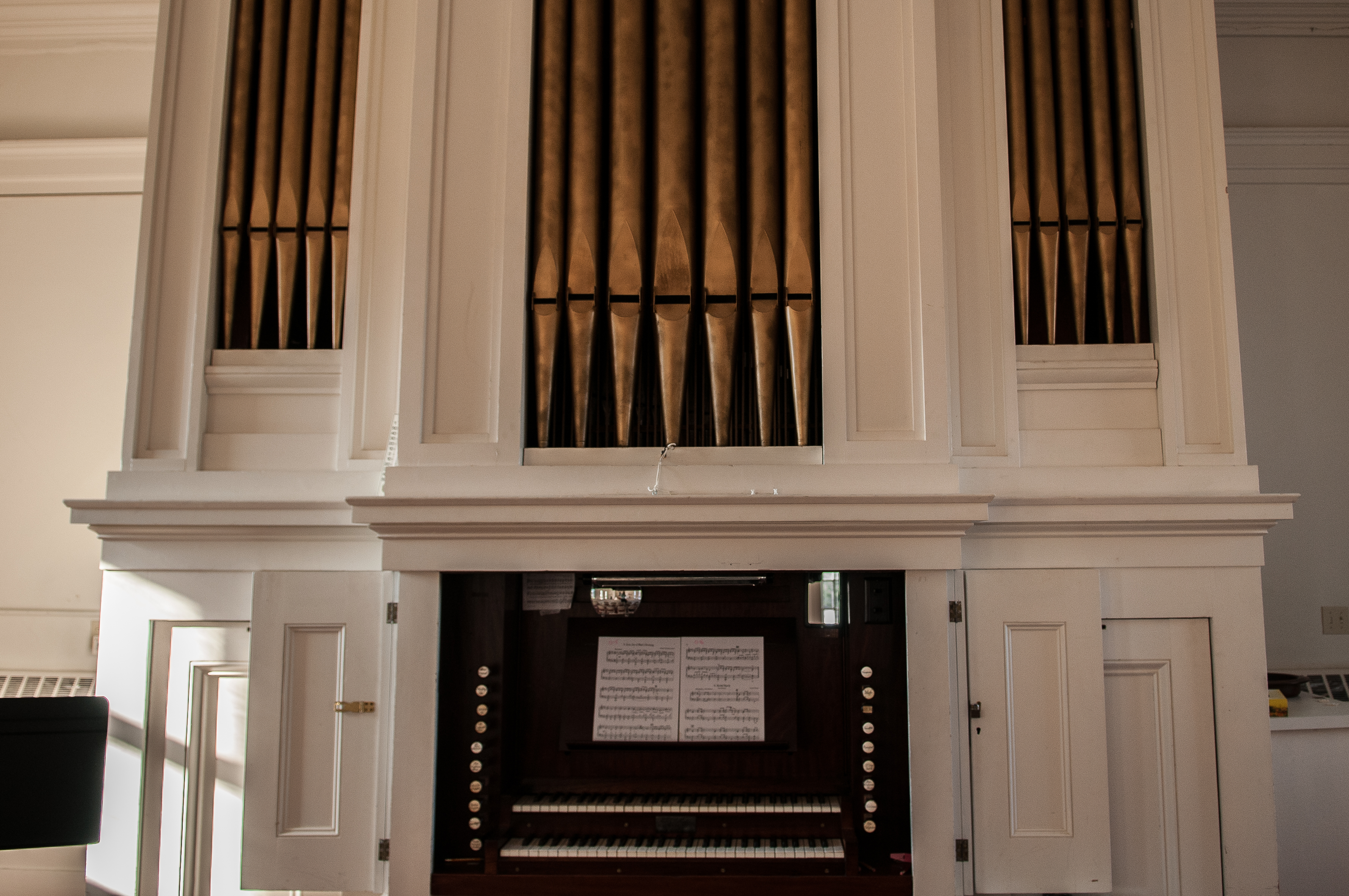
First Church's 1847 G Compass Organ

First Church's 1847 G compass parlor-type organ was installed in 1861. It sits in the choir loft at the rear of the sanctuary, with the organist's position facing away from the sanctuary.

An electric blower in the basement of the church replaced the calcant powered foot bellows in the 1960s. Originally, a child, or "urchin" acted as the calcant and powered the organ from within the case. Several current church members remember serving in this capacity as children.

The organ has two manuals, 15 stops, and a "toothpick" style pedal-board.

== Artifacts ==
=== Captain Peter Adolph Bell ===
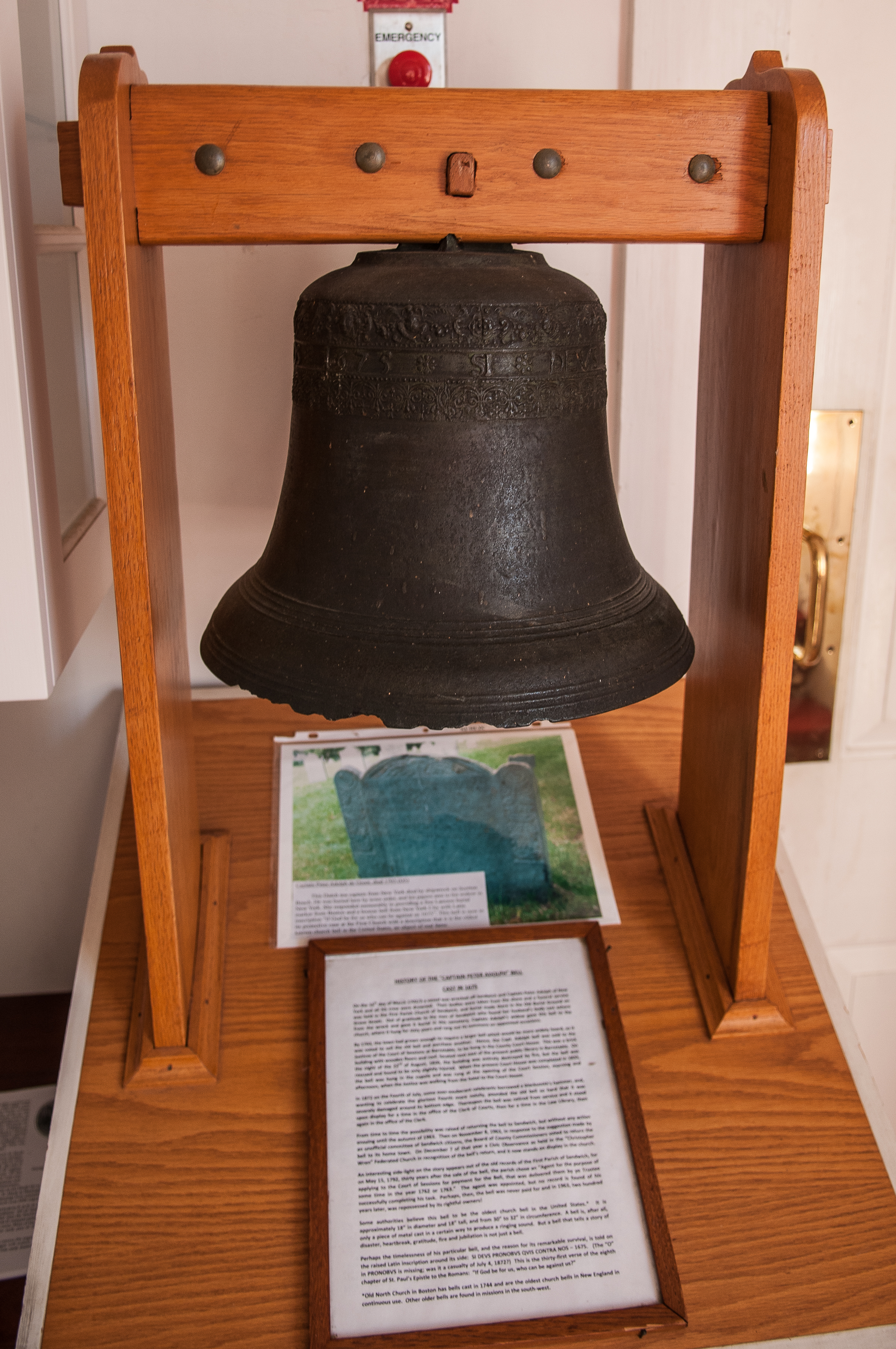
The Captain Peter Adolph Bell on display at First Church.

Cast in 1675, the Captain Peter Adolph Bell is believed by some authorities to be the oldest Church Bell in the United States.

On the 16th day of March 1702/3 a vessel was shipwrecked off the Sandwich coast. Captain Peter Adolph of New York and all his crew were drowned. Their bodies were taken from the shore and a funeral service was held in the First Parish Church of Sandwich. Burial was made in the Old Burial Ground on Grove Street. Out of gratitude to the men of Sandwich who found her husband's body cast ashore from the wreck and gave it a burial in this cemetery, Captain Adolph's widow gave this bell to the church, where it hung for sixty years and rang out its summons on appointed occasions.

The bell, given in gratitude for the services of the men of Sandwich, First Church, and Pastor Roland Cotton, bears the Latin inscription from Romans 8:31 "SI DEVS PRONOBVS QVIS CONTRA NOS - 1675," meaning, "If God is for us, who can be against us?"

First Church began using a larger bell in 1763, and the Captain Peter Adolph bell was sold to the County Courthouse. The bell survived the complete destruction of the Courthouse by fire on August 22, 1826, and was then reinstalled at the new Court House in 1833. The bell was taken out of service after drunken celebrants damaged its bottom edge with a blacksmith's hammer on July 4, 1872.

The bell is now on display in First Church's narthex.

=== Moody Russell Communion Service ===
This pair of silver beakers is currently in the Sylmaris Collection of the New York Metropolitan Museum of Art.

Small-sized beakers with flared lips and applied moldings feature frequently in the communion vessels owned by early New England churches. In the absence of a priest to administer the sacrament, congregants could easily pass these small cylindrical cups among themselves during the communion service...[These beakers] remained the property of the First Parish Church of Sandwich, Massachusetts, for nearly two hundred years, and the name of their donor and date of his gift are clearly inscribed. Shearjashub Bourne (1643–1718/19), whose cash bequest to the church is commemorated in the engraved inscription, was the son of English immigrant Richard Bourne and his wife, Bathsheba Nee Hallett. Shearjashub, a missionary, purchased land for the Marshpee Indians and lived with them in the territory that he procured...
