= East Sandwich, Massachusetts =

- Census-designated place
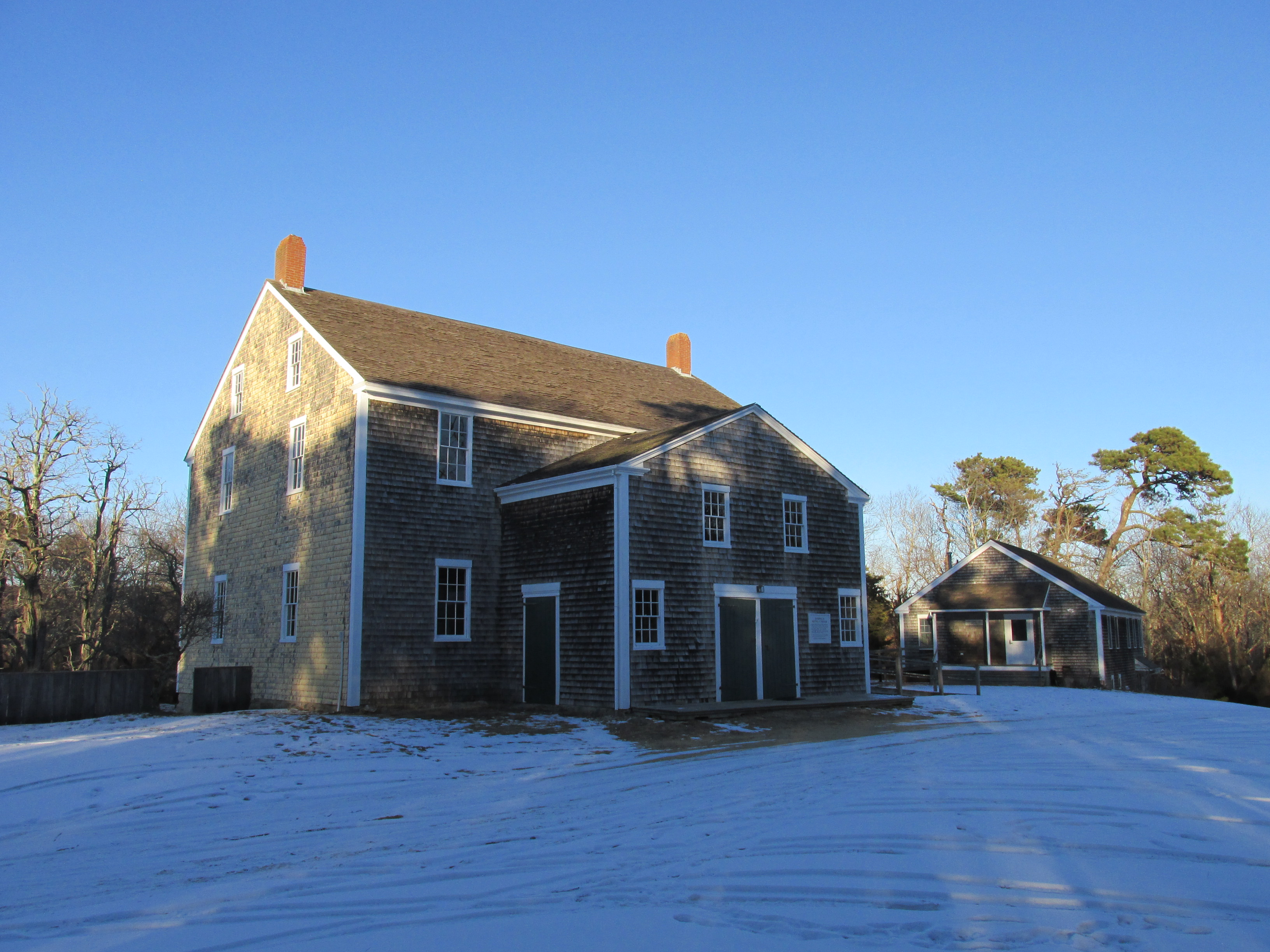
- East Sandwich Friends Meeting House

- Location in Barnstable County and the state of Massachusetts.
- Coordinates: 41°44′16″N 70°25′23″W
- Country: United States
- State: Massachusetts
- County: Barnstable
- Town: Sandwich

Area
  - Total: 7.64 sq mi (19.80 km^{2})
  - Land: 7.52 sq mi (19.47 km^{2})
  - Water: 0.13 sq mi (0.33 km^{2})
- Elevation: 30 ft (9 m)

Population (2020)
  - Total: 3,669
  - Density: 488.1/sq mi (188.47/km^{2})
- Time zone: UTC-5 (Eastern (EST))
  - Summer (DST): UTC-4 (EDT)
- ZIP Codes: 02537 (East Sandwich); 02563 (Sandwich)
- Area code: 508
- FIPS code: 25-20380
- GNIS feature ID: 0616595

East Sandwich is a village and census-designated place (CDP) within the town of Sandwich in Barnstable County, Massachusetts. As of the 2020 census, East Sandwich had a population of 3,669.

== Geography ==
East Sandwich is located in the northeastern portion of the town of Sandwich at 41°44′16″N 70°25′23″W (41.737654, -70.423178). It is bordered by Cape Cod Bay to the north, the village of Sandwich to the west, U.S. Route 6 to the south, and the town of Barnstable to the east. The line between East Sandwich and Sandwich village is formed by Chipman Road, Crowell Road, Charles Street, and Water Street (Massachusetts Route 130). Massachusetts Route 6A is the main road through the community.

According to the United States Census Bureau, the East Sandwich CDP has a total area of 7.6 square miles (19.6 km^{2}), of which 7.5 square miles (19.3 km^{2}) is land, and 0.12 square miles (0.3 km^{2}) (1.67%) is water.

== Demographics ==
Historical population
Census	Pop.	Note	%±
2020	3,669		—
U.S. Decennial Census

=== 2020 census ===
As of the 2020 census, East Sandwich had a population of 3,669. The median age was 54.7 years. 16.9% of residents were under the age of 18 and 31.0% of residents were 65 years of age or older. For every 100 females there were 96.8 males, and for every 100 females age 18 and over there were 95.1 males age 18 and over.

100.0% of residents lived in urban areas, while 0.0% lived in rural areas.

There were 1,506 households in East Sandwich, of which 22.0% had children under the age of 18 living in them. Of all households, 64.0% were married-couple households, 12.2% were households with a male householder and no spouse or partner present, and 20.1% were households with a female householder and no spouse or partner present. About 21.8% of all households were made up of individuals and 13.4% had someone living alone who was 65 years of age or older.

There were 2,176 housing units, of which 30.8% were vacant. The homeowner vacancy rate was 1.5% and the rental vacancy rate was 21.6%.

Racial composition as of the 2020 census
Race	Number	Percent
White	3,468	94.5%
Black or African American	10	0.3%
American Indian and Alaska Native	1	0.0%
Asian	29	0.8%
Native Hawaiian and Other Pacific Islander	2	0.1%
Some other race	21	0.6%
Two or more races	138	3.8%
Hispanic or Latino (of any race)	53	1.4%

=== 2010 census ===
As of the census of 2010, there were 3,940 people, 2,914 households, and 1,055 families residing in the CDP. The population density was 190.2 people/km^{2} (493 people/mi^{2}). There were 2,044 housing units at an average density of 105.5 units/km^{2} (273 units/mi^{2}). The racial makeup of the CDP was 98.68% White, 0.22% African American, 0.08% Native American, 0.35% Asian, 0.03% Pacific Islander, 0.22% from other races, and 0.43% from two or more races. Hispanic or Latino of any race were 0.67% of the population.

There were 1,466 households, out of which 29.5% had children under the age of 18 living with them, 64.3% were married couples living together, 6.1% had a female householder with no husband present, and 28.0% were non-families. 22.6% of all households were made up of individuals, and 9.3% had someone living alone who was 65 years of age or older. The average household size was 2.54 and the average family size was 3.02.

In the CDP, the population was spread out, with 23.7% under the age of 18, 5.0% from 18 to 24, 21.8% from 25 to 44, 33.9% from 45 to 64, and 15.6% who were 65 years of age or older. The median age was 45 years. For every 100 females, there were 94.2 males. For every 100 females age 18 and over, there were 90.8 males.

The median income for a household in the CDP was $66,318, and the median income for a family was $74,457. Males had a median income of $53,304 versus $36,042 for females. The per capita income for the CDP was $32,676. About 1.5% of families and 2.2% of the population were below the poverty line, including 4.0% of those under age 18 and 1.9% of those age 65 or over.

== Notable people ==
- Dodge MacKnight (1860–1950), Post-Impressionist artist
- Peter Peltz (1915–2001), artist
- Tom Ellis (1932–2019), newscaster
