= Abraham Williams (reverend) =

Birth/death: 1727–1784 pastor of the church in Sandwich, MA

Abraham Williams (reverend) (1724–1787) was born on 25 February 1727, in Marlborough, Middlesex, Massachusetts Bay Colony, British Colonial America. He received his formal education at Harvard University and graduated in 1744. With an audacious character Williams became to be known as "the Grand Heritick Williams" while a student.

Rev. Abraham Williams, was the son of Abraham Williams of Marlboro, Massachusetts and Elisabeth Breck. Williams was invited to preach in Sandwich. at a time when the parish was much divided and harassed by internal strife, but his presence there succeeded in reconciling the disputing parties so that early in 1749 he was called to accept the pastorate on a permanent basis, which was unanimously extended by the parish.

Williams was ordained in 1749 and served as a pastor in the town Sandwich, Massachusetts.

Williams married Anna Buckminster, the daughter of Col. Joseph Buckminster of Framingham, Massachusetts on September 11, 1751. They would go on to have 10 children. He was invited to deliver a sermon before the Assembly of the House of Representatives of the Massachusetts Bay Colony in Boston in 1762.

In 1765 Williams delivered a sermon before the governor and the General Court of Massachusetts in opposition to the Stamp Act of 1765.

Williams Sr. was a soldier in the Continental Army, where two of his sons died on British prison ships, Accordingly, Abraham (Jr.) became an outspoken supporter of colonial independence from England and said as much during some of his sermons. In 1780 he was elected to the newly formed American Academy of Arts & Sciences.

Williams died in 1784 at the age of 57 and was buried in Old Town Cemetery in Sandwich.

== See also ==
- American Revolution

== Sources ==
- Lutz, Donald; Hyneman, Charles, eds. (1983). American political writing during the founding =era, 1760–1805. Liberty Fund Inc.
- Freeman, Frederick (1858). The history of Cape Cod: the annals of Barnstable County, including the district of Mashpee. Vol. I. Boston, Geo. C. Rand & Avery.
- Freeman, Frederick (1858). The history of Cape Cod: the annals of Barnstable County, including the district of Mashpee. Vol. II. Boston, Geo. C. Rand & Avery.
- Williams, Abraham (1865) [1762]. A sermon preach'd at Boston, before the Great and General Court or Assembly of the province of the Massachusetts-Bay in New-England, May 26. 1762. Being the day appointed by royal charter, for the election of His Majesty's Council for said province. J.E. Tilton.
