= Edmund Freeman =

Early American colonial politician

Edmund Freeman II, More simply known as just Edmund Freeman (c. July 25, 1596 – 1682) was one of the founders of Sandwich, Massachusetts and an Assistant Governor of Plymouth Colony from 1640 to 1647, serving under Governor William Bradford and Governor Edward Winslow.

== Biography ==
=== Early life ===
Freeman was the son of Edmund and Alice (Coles) Freeman of Pulborough in Sussex, England and was baptised July 25, 1596. Edmund married firstly to Bennett Hodsoll on June 16, 1617, she was buried at Pulborough on April 12, 1630. Freeman along with his second wife Elizabeth and his family set sail from Plymouth, England on 4 June 1635 aboard the Abigail. During the crossing an epidemic of smallpox broke out on shipboard. They arrived in Boston on 8 October 1635 and then settled in Saugus.

Edmund (or Edmond) Freeman was admitted freeman at Plymouth on 23 January 1637.

He was one of the ten founders of Sandwich, Massachusetts. Freeman died in 1682 in Sandwich. He is buried in a well-known, marked private burial plot in Sandwich along with his second wife Elizabeth.

=== Marriage and family ===
His son, Edmund Freeman III. baptized on November 26, 1620, at Billingshurst, Sussex County, England and died before January 5, 1703/1704. He married Margaret Perry, on April 22, 1646, at Eastham, Barnstable County, Massachusetts.

His son John Freeman bapt. on January 28, 1626/1627, at Billingshurst, Sussex County, England and died on October 28, 1719, at Eastham, Barnstable County, Massachusetts.

First as a lieutenant, then as captain, and later as major, he took an active part in the Indian Wars. He was a major in the expedition against Indians at Saconet in 1677. He served as a member Council of War from 1667 to 1676. He served as captain in the fight against Indians at Taunton in 1675. He was a major of Barnstable Troop in 1685 and Deputy at Eastham for eight years. He served as a selectman for ten years starting in 1663. On December 7, 1692, he was appointed to the Bench of the Court of Common Pleas. For many years he was a deacon of the Eastham Congregational Church.

John married Mercy Prence, on February 13, 1649, at Eastham, Barnstable County, Massachusetts. She was born c. 1631 at Plymouth, Plymouth County, Massachusetts and died on September 28, 1711, at Eastham, Barnstable County, Massachusetts.

She was a daughter of Gov. Thomas Prence and Patience Brewster, a daughter of Elder William Brewster (pilgrim), (c. 1567 – April 10, 1644), the Pilgrim leader and spiritual elder of the Plymouth Colony and a passenger on the Mayflower. John and Mercy (Prence) Freeman are buried in the Cove Burying Ground in Eastham.

Through him descends Brigadier General Nathaniel Freeman and the notorious Lizzie Borden. Other descendants of note are film director George Lucas and cowboy artist/sculptor Earl W. Bascom.

There is no good evidence for the maiden surname of Elizabeth, second wife of Edmund Freeman II. Robert Charles Anderson lists her surname as blank. Homer Worthington Brainard says she was a widow, Elizabeth Perry. Both Rosemary Canfield and Henry J. Perry suggest that she may have been the Elizabeth Raymer who married at Shipley, Sussex, 10 Aug 1632, Edmund Freeman II. Shipley is a village about four miles from Billinghurst on the road to Cowfold.
