= Hoxie House =

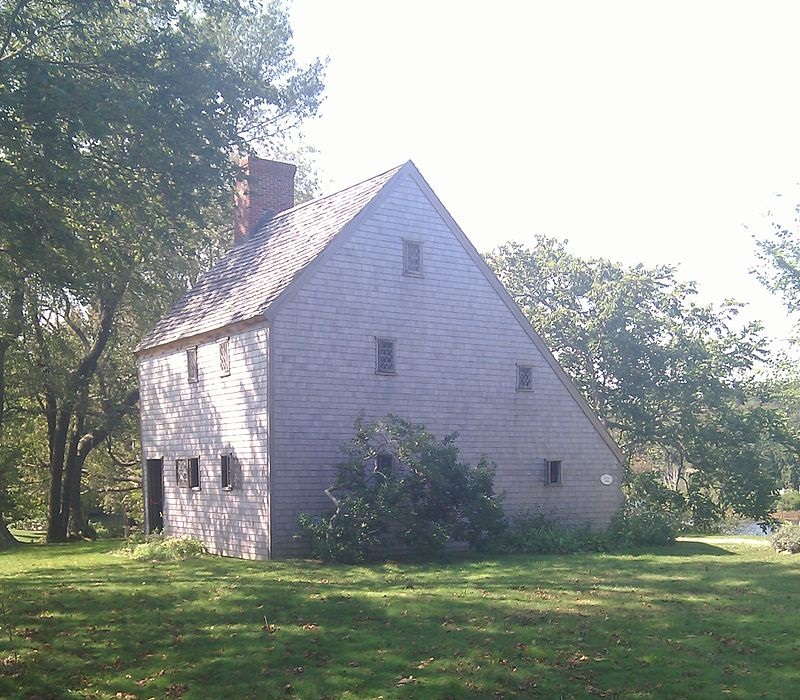
- The Hoxie House in 2011

- Location within Massachusetts

General information
- Type: House
- Architectural style: First Period
- Location: Sandwich, Massachusetts, 16 Water St
- Coordinates: 41°45′18″N 70°29′55″W
- Completed: c. 1675 (MACRIS)
- Renovated: 1959 (restored)

Website
- www.sandwichmass.org/419/Museums

The Hoxie House (c. 1675) is a saltbox house located in Sandwich, Massachusetts. According to the Massachusetts Historical Commission, it is likely the oldest extant house "in the area". The residence was owned by both the Smith and Hoxie families before being turned over to the town of Sandwich in 1959. During this time the house was restored, and it now operates as a museum.

== History ==
The saltbox house was built in the mid-seventeenth century and occupied around 1675 by reverend John Smith. Smith served as pastor of the Separatist First Church of Sandwich from 1673 until 1689. He also served as a representative in the legislature, and recommended tolerance of the Quakers. Smith's descendants owned and occupied the house until 1856, when school teacher Bethia Smith passed away.

The house was subsequently acquired by a retired whaling captain named Abraham Hoxie in the 1850s or by 1860. Hoxie died in 1887, and his descendants continued to live in the house. It was not until the early 1950s that modern amenities such as electricity, plumbing and central heat were added. In 1957, the town of Sandwich took possession of the house after the Hoxie family failed to pay owed property taxes. The "deteriorated" house was extensively restored in 1959 retaining most of the original structural members; the fireplaces and chimneys had to be rebuilt.

As it stands presently, the Hoxie House is a 2.5-story half house with an integral rear lean-to. There is also a small, one-story ell on the west side. Fresh cedar shakes were added to the residence in 2008 using $50,000 in community preservation funds allocated by the town. In 2011, the name Smith-Hoxie House was floated as a name change to honor the original builder, but nothing was followed up on. The town of Sandwich operates the house as a museum yearly for visitors.

== Gallery ==
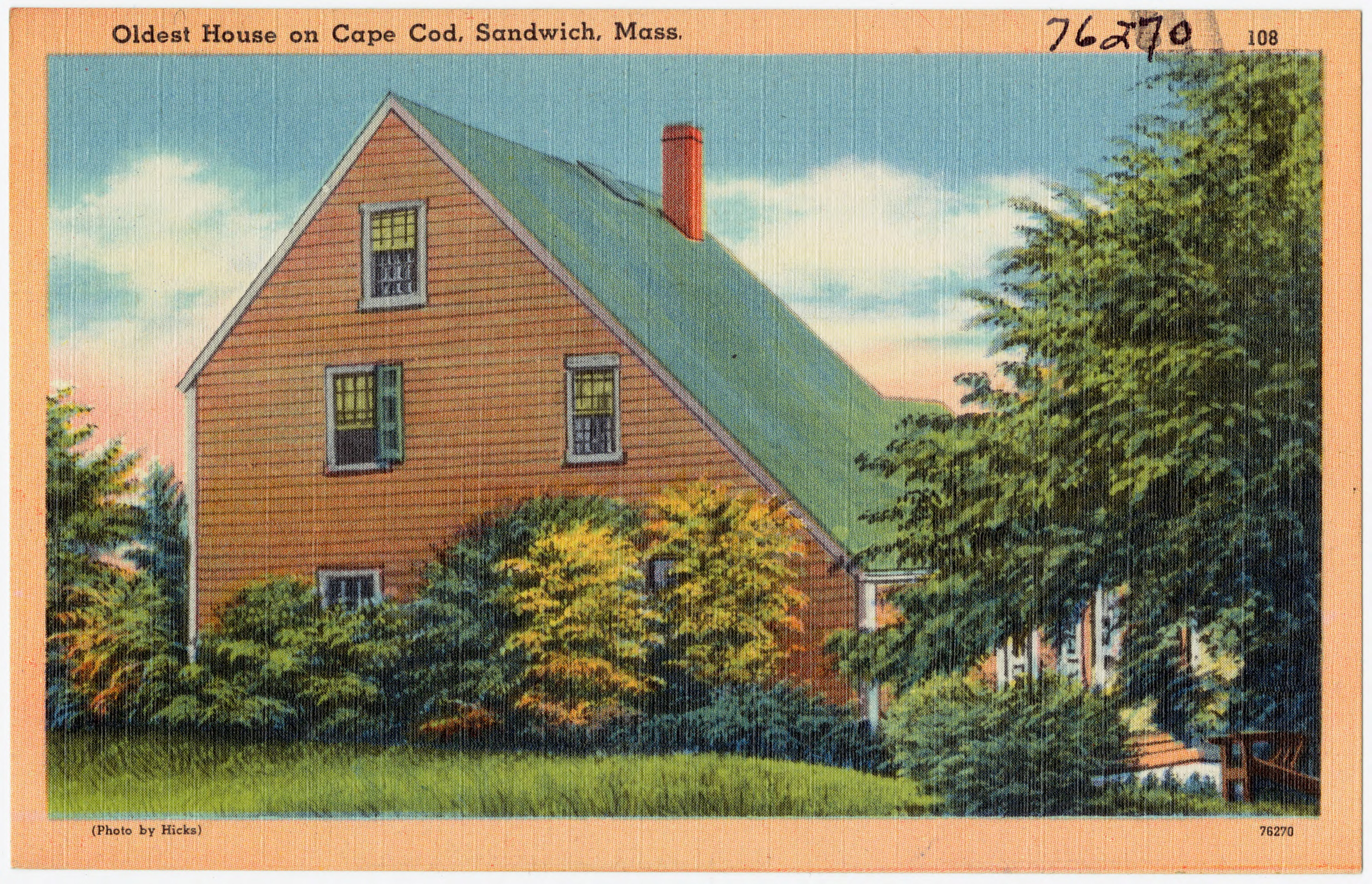
Undated post card of the Hoxie House

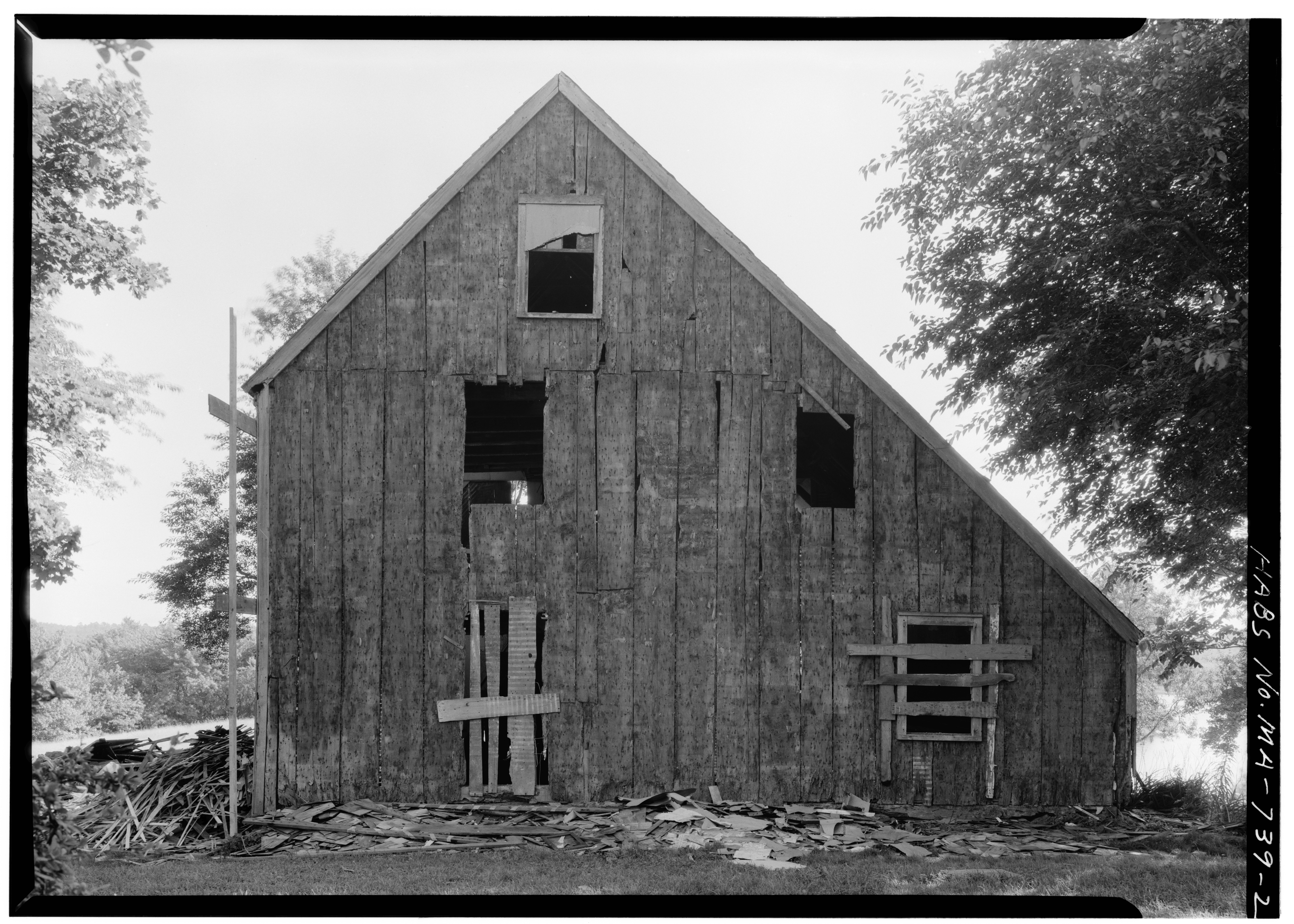
Hoxie House (front view) - 1959 restoration

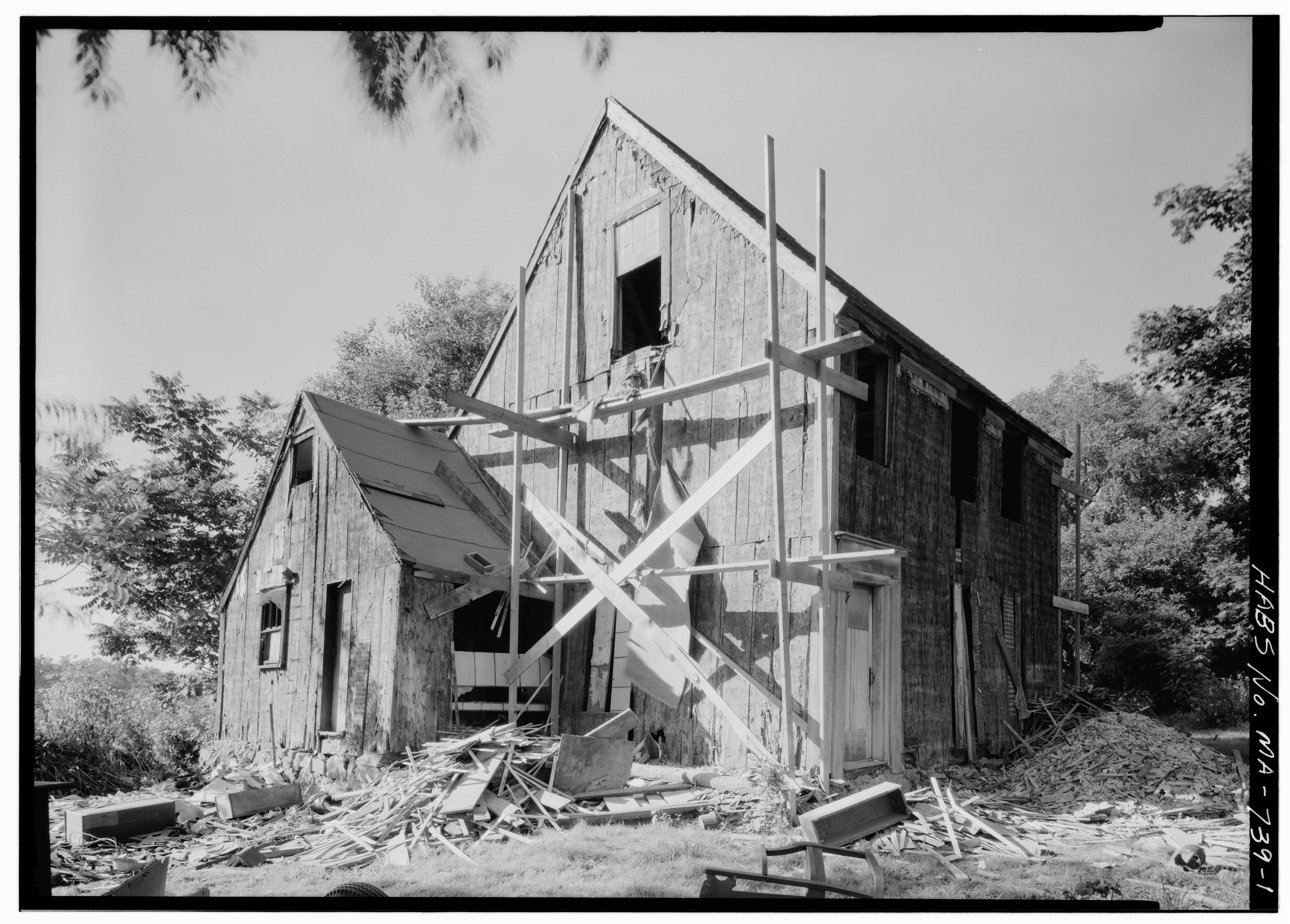
Hoxie House (back view) - 1959 restoration

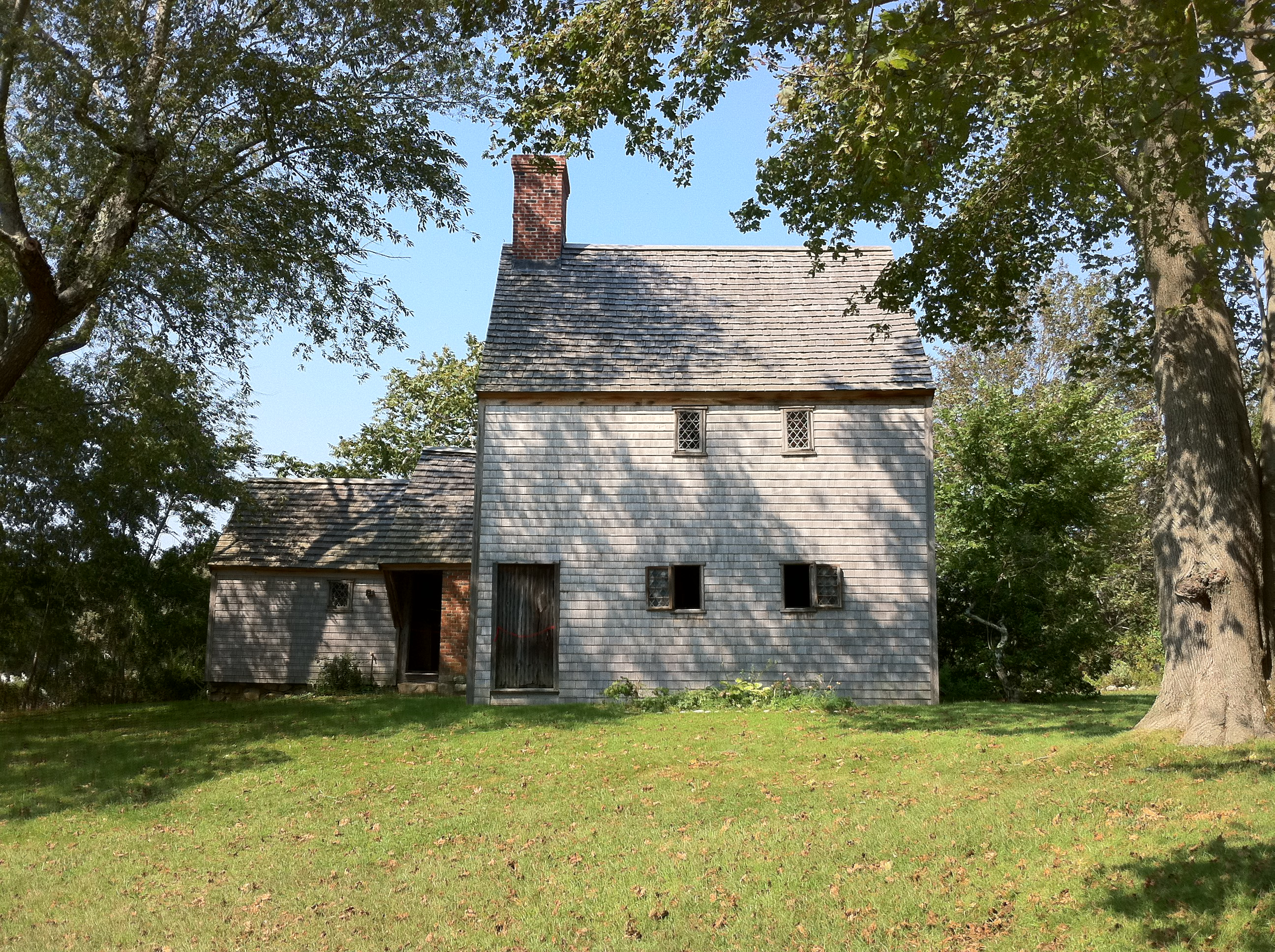
Side view of the Hoxie House (2011)

== See also ==
- List of the oldest buildings in Massachusetts
