= Canal Generating Plant =

Power station in Sandwich, Massachusetts, US

- Country: United States
- Location: Sandwich, Massachusetts
- Coordinates: 41°46′14.02″N 70°30′33.81″W
- Status: Operational
- Commission date: 1968
- Owner: Ironclad Energy

Thermal power station
- Primary fuel: Oil

Power generation
- Nameplate capacity: 1,226 MW

The Canal Generating Plant is a petroleum and natural gas electrical power station in Sandwich, Massachusetts. Canal 1, a baseload unit, began operation in 1968 and was for many years the most efficient oil burning plant in the US. Canal 2, a cycling unit, began operation in the mid-1970s. The plant was bought by Mirant in 1999, now GenOn Energy Holdings division of NRG Energy. It is located on Cape Cod Canal. In its heyday, the Canal plant generated the vast majority of the Cape's power, but today functions only as a peaking plant.

In an attempt to modernize the plant, the owners constructed a 330-megawatt Simple cycle natural gas plant capable of going online within 10 minutes, and a 1.5 MW solar array on the property. The third unit has the ability to run on #2 oil during cold periods in the winter when natural gas pipelines are constrained.

In 2018 it was sold to private equity firm Ironclad Energy, a subsidiary of Stonepeak Infrastructure Partners.
