= Massachusetts Route 130 =

State highway in Barnstable County, Massachusetts, US

Route 130
- Route 130 highlighted in red

Route information
- Maintained by MassDOT
- Length: 11.90 mi (19.15 km)

Major junctions
- South end: Route 28 in Barnstable
- US 6 in Sandwich
- North end: Route 6A in Sandwich

Location
- Country: United States
- State: Massachusetts
- Counties: Barnstable

Highway system
- Massachusetts State Highway System; Interstate; US; State
← Route 129A	→ Route 131

Route 130 is a 11.90-mile-long (19.15 km) state highway in the U.S. state of Massachusetts. Its southern terminus is at Route 28 in Barnstable and the northern terminus is at Route 6A in Sandwich. Along the way it intersects U.S. Route 6 (US 6) at exit 59 in Sandwich.

== Route description ==
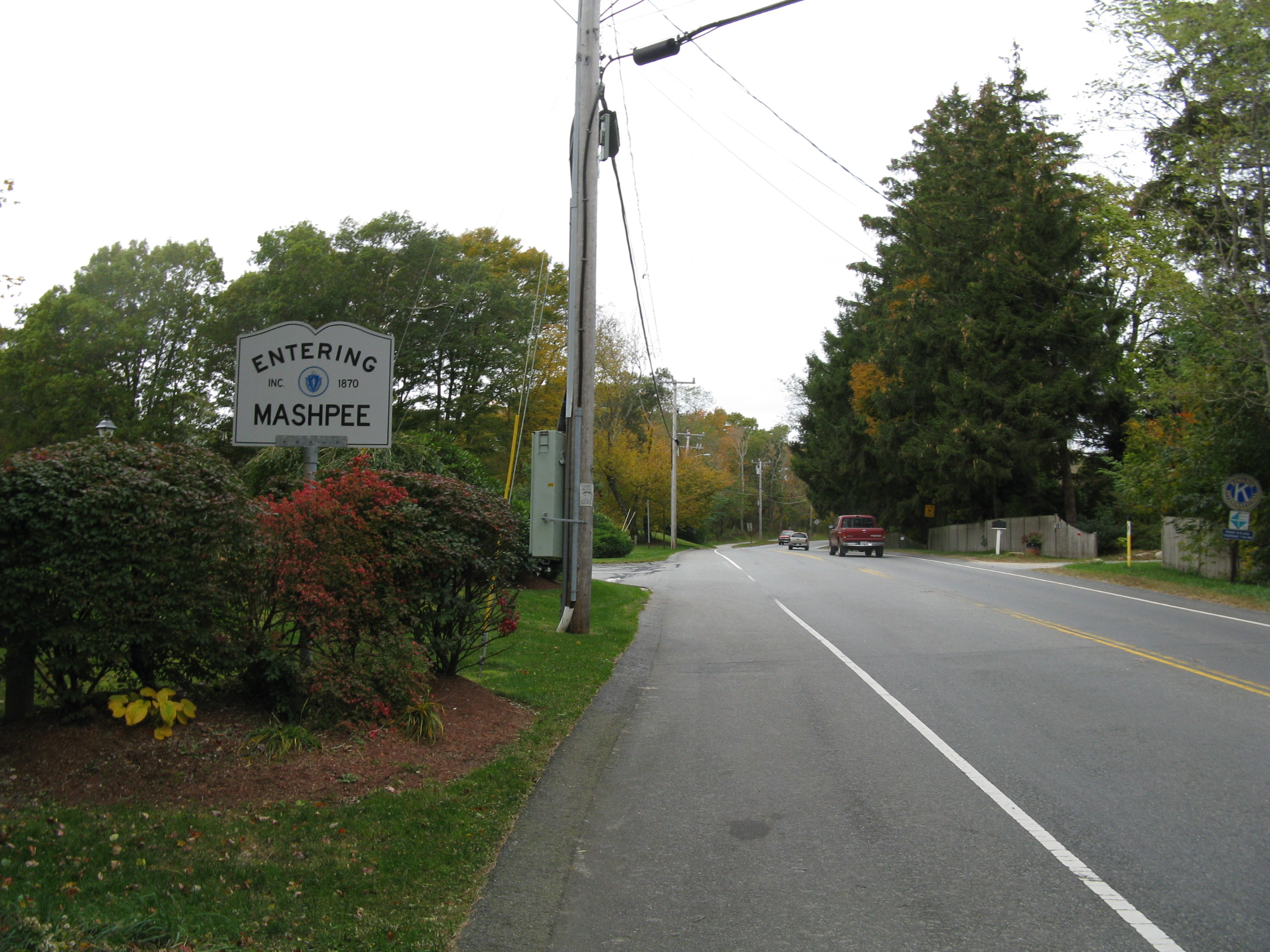
Route 130 northbound entering Mashpee

Route 130 begins in the Santuit section of Barnstable at Route 28 and enters Mashpee 0.2-mile (0.32 km) from the terminus and travels on a north–south path through Sandwich. The highway runs through the village of Forestdale in the southern section of the town. Later it intersects with US 6 at exit 59 and then passes through the historic part of Sandwich, which includes such landmarks as the Dexter's Grist Mill, the Hoxie House, the Sandwich Glass Museum, and the Thorton W. Burgess Museum. Route 130 passes Shawme-Crowell State Forest before ending at Route 6A just before the town line with Bourne east of Sagamore.

== Major intersections ==
The entire route is in Barnstable County.

Location	mi	km	Destinations	Notes
Barnstable	0.00	0.00	Route 28 (Falmouth Road) – Marstons Mills, Centerville, Falmouth	Southern terminus
Sandwich	8.90– 9.10	14.32– 14.65	US 6 (Mid-Cape Highway) – Orleans, Provincetown, Boston, Providence RI	Exit 59 on US 6; partial cloverleaf interchange
Sandwich	11.90	19.15	Route 6A (Old Kings Highway) – Buzzards Bay, Boston, Barnstable	Northern terminus
1.000 mi = 1.609 km; 1.000 km = 0.621 mi
