= Sandwich Glass Museum =

History museum in Massachusetts, U.S.

Coordinates: 41°45′31″N 70°30′02″W

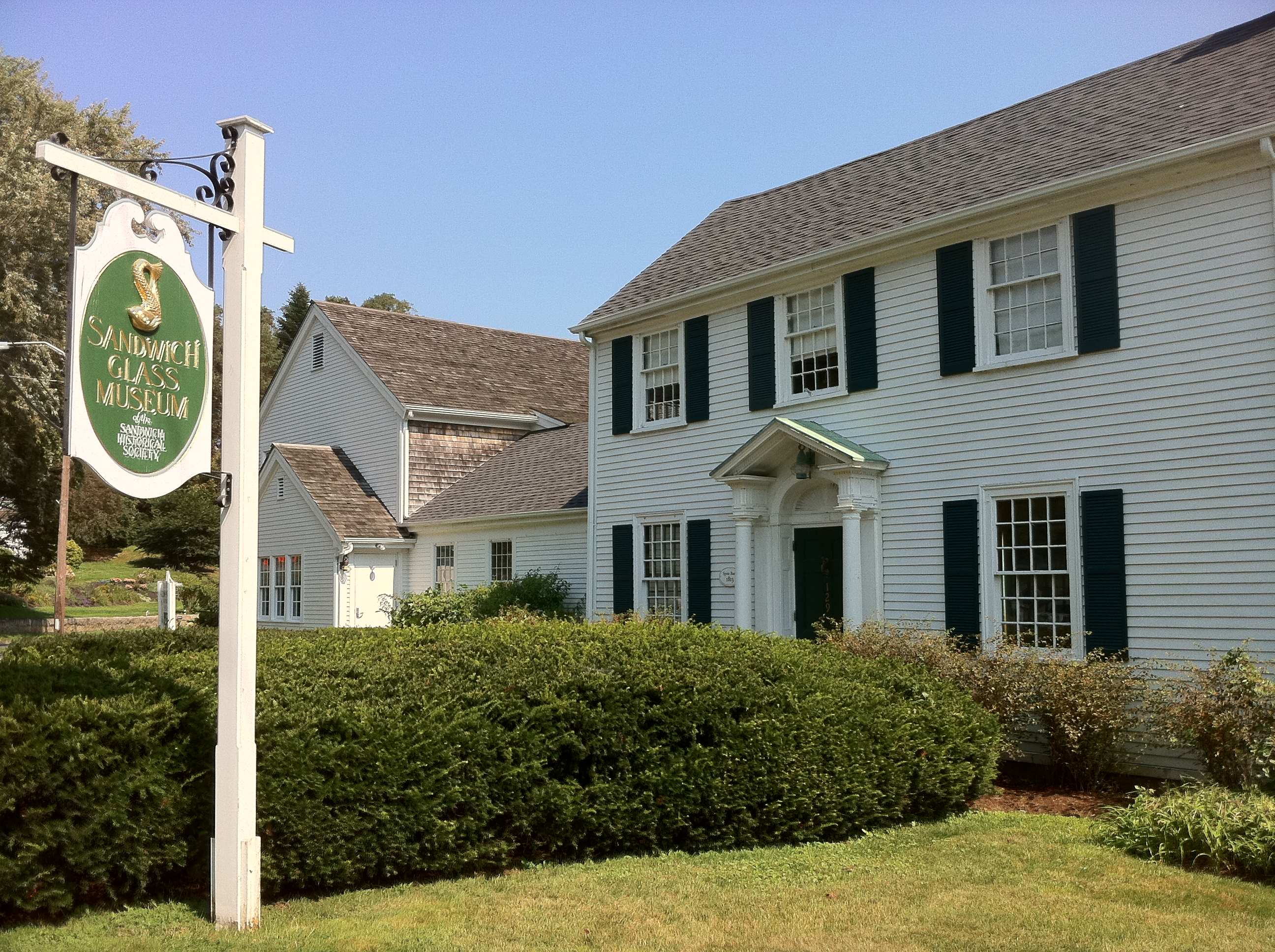
Sandwich Glass Museum

Sandwich Glass Museum is a town history museum in Sandwich, Massachusetts, featuring a wide range of rare glass, including Victorian era glass manufactured by the now defunct local Boston & Sandwich Glass Factory, founded in Sandwich by Deming Jarves in 1825. The Sandwich Glass Works primarily manufactured pressed lead-based glass, and was known for its use of color. The museum also has a live glass blower, exhibits detailing the creation and coloring of various types of rare glass, as well as rotating exhibits of contemporary studio glass art from local and regional artists.

It has a furnace for clear glass heated to 2200 deg F that it runs 24x7 that shuts down only once every five years, and a computerized annealing oven to slowly cool down new creations over a full day to help prevent cracking.

Live demonstrations of the craft of glassblowing are held every hour on the hour and last for 15 minutes. The demonstrations include glass-blowing, shaping, mold-forming and adding bits of glass color known as frit. The objects created during the demo change day to day, influenced by the time of year and nearby holidays. The museum also has a historical movie that plays once per hour, as well as a series of galleries each focused on a time period or glass creation techniques.

There is a shop at the end featuring contemporary studio glass, primarily from regional artists, as well as museum-created items.

== External ==
- Sandwich Glass Museum
