= Sandwich (CDP), Massachusetts =

Sandwich, Massachusetts
- Census-designated place
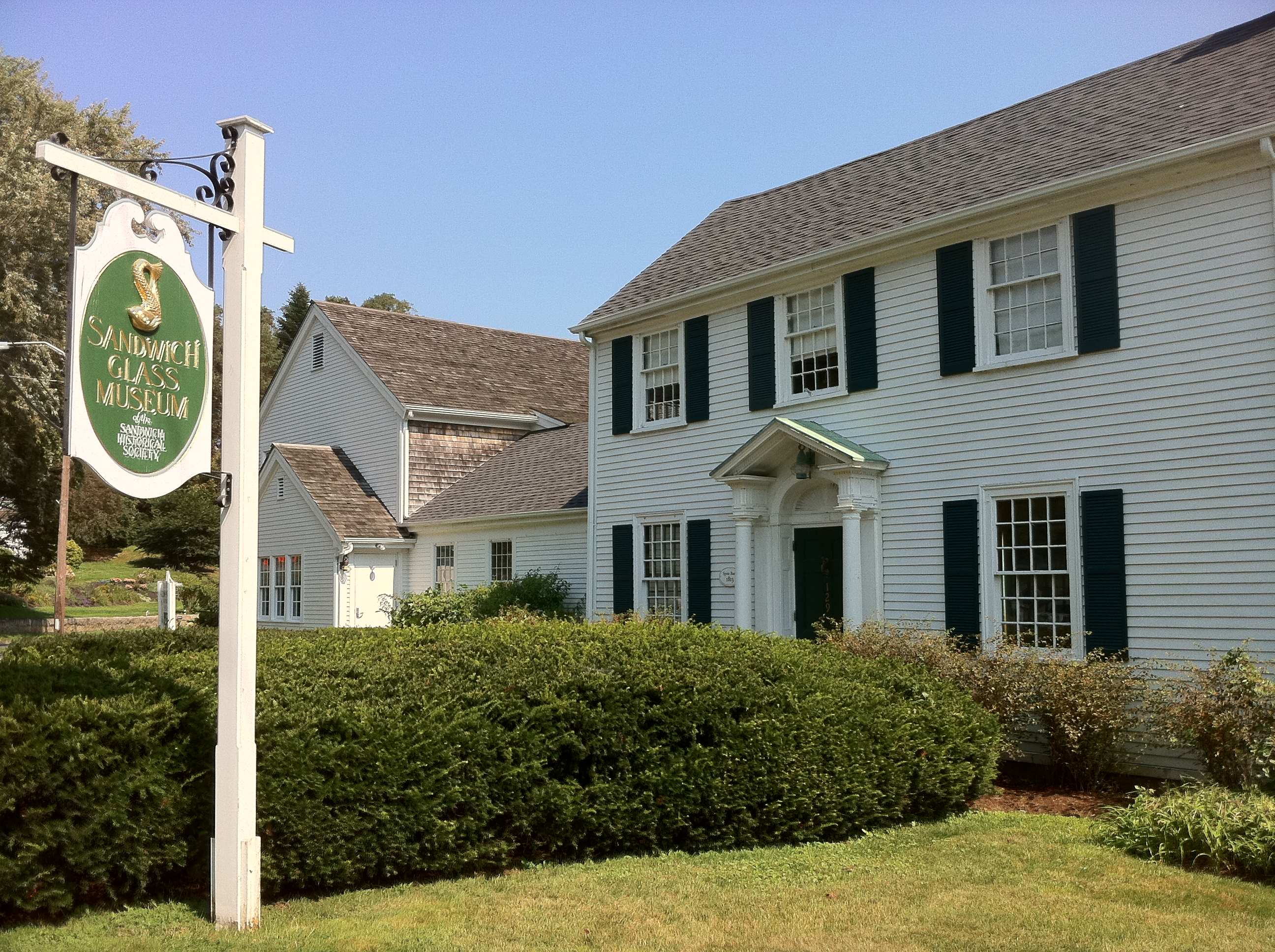
- Sandwich Glass Museum

- Location in Barnstable County and the state of Massachusetts.
- Coordinates: 41°45′32″N 70°30′1″W
- Country: United States
- State: Massachusetts
- County: Barnstable
- Town: Sandwich

Area
  - Total: 3.81 sq mi (9.86 km^{2})
  - Land: 3.63 sq mi (9.39 km^{2})
  - Water: 0.19 sq mi (0.48 km^{2})
- Elevation: 13 ft (4 m)

Population (2020)
  - Total: 2,998
  - Density: 827.1/sq mi (319.36/km^{2})
- Time zone: UTC-5 (Eastern (EST))
  - Summer (DST): UTC-4 (EDT)
- ZIP Code: 02563
- Area code: 508
- FIPS code: 25-59700
- GNIS feature ID: 0616643

Sandwich is a village and census-designated place (CDP) in the town of Sandwich in Barnstable County, Massachusetts, United States. The population was 2,962 at the 2010 census, out of a total of 20,675 people in the town of Sandwich.

== Geography ==
Sandwich village is located in the northwestern part of the town of Sandwich at 41°45′32″N 70°30′0″W (41.75891, -70.500174). It is bordered to the north by Massachusetts Route 6A and the Cape Cod Canal, to the northeast by Cape Cod Bay, to the east by the Dock Creek saltmarsh and the CDP of East Sandwich, to the south by U.S. Route 6 (the Mid-Cape Highway), and to the west by the town of Bourne.

According to the United States Census Bureau, the CDP has a total area of 3.8 square miles (9.9 km^{2}), of which 3.6 square miles (9.4 km^{2}) is land and 0.19 square miles (0.5 km^{2}) of it (4.90%) is water.

== Demographics ==
Historical population
Census	Pop.	Note	%±
2020	2,998		—
U.S. Decennial Census

As of the census of 2000, there were 3,058 people, 1,379 households, and 864 families residing in the CDP. The population density was 329.8/km^{2} (854.5/mi^{2}). There were 1,706 housing units at an average density of 184.0/km^{2} (476.7/mi^{2}). The racial makeup of the CDP was 98.04% White, 0.23% Black or African American, 0.13% Native American, 0.49% Asian, 0.03% Pacific Islander, 0.46% from other races, and 0.62% from two or more races. Hispanic or Latino of any race were 0.65% of the population.

There were 1,379 households, out of which 21.4% had children under the age of 18 living with them, 50.3% were married couples living together, 9.4% had a female householder with no husband present, and 37.3% were non-families. 32.4% of all households were made up of individuals, and 17.5% had someone living alone who was 65 years of age or older. The average household size was 2.21 and the average family size was 2.80.

In the CDP, the population was spread out, with 19.1% under the age of 18, 5.2% from 18 to 24, 21.9% from 25 to 44, 30.0% from 45 to 64, and 23.9% who were 65 years of age or older. The median age was 48 years. For every 100 females, there were 85.4 males. For every 100 females age 18 and over, there were 81.0 males.

The median income for a household in the CDP was $56,184, and the median income for a family was $63,789. Males had a median income of $40,417 versus $32,963 for females. The per capita income for the CDP was $30,817. About 2.3% of families and 4.5% of the population were below the poverty line, including 5.8% of those under age 18 and 2.6% of those age 65 or over.
