= Sandwich, Massachusetts =

- Town
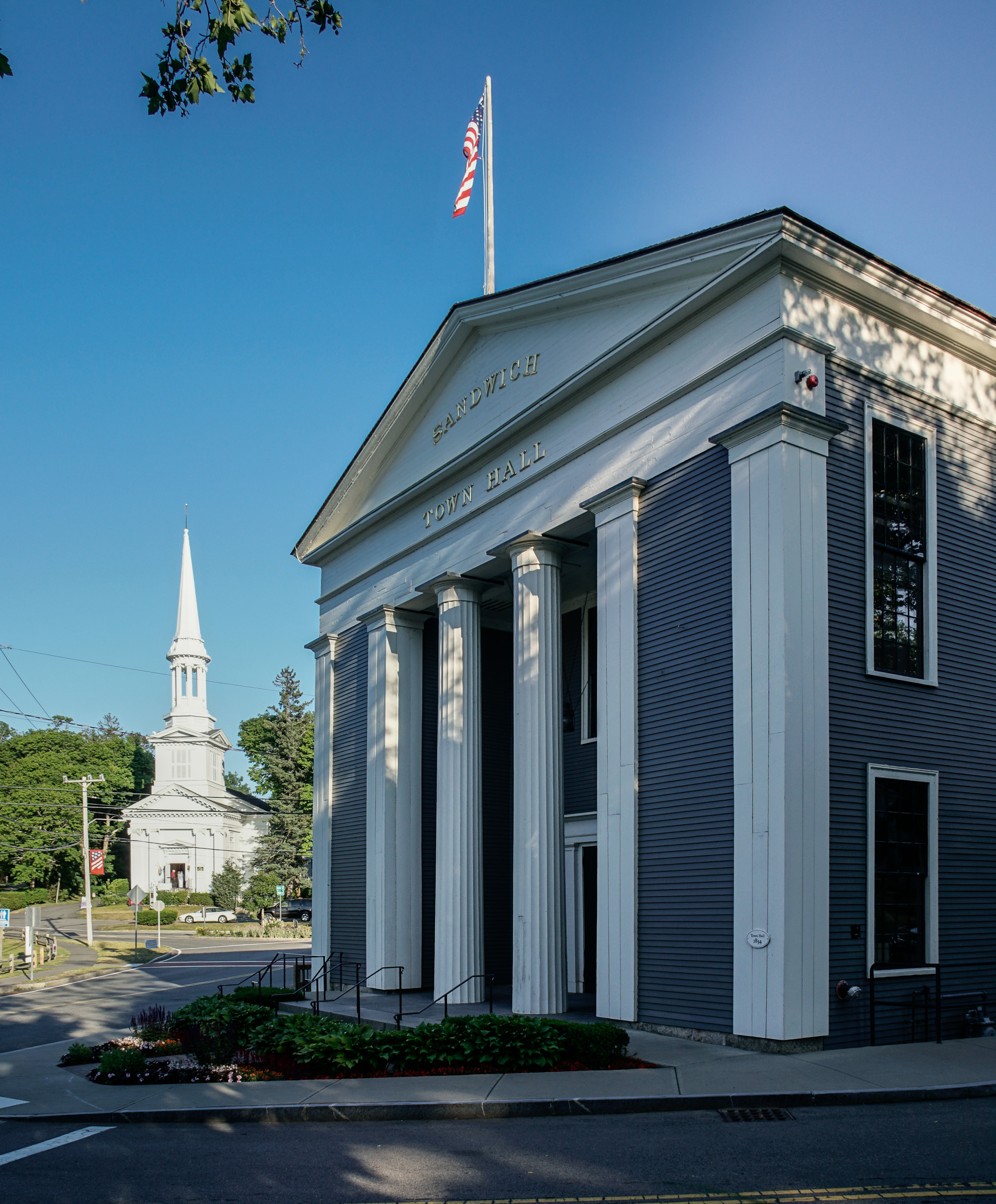
- Sandwich Town Hall (1834) and Congregational Church (1848)

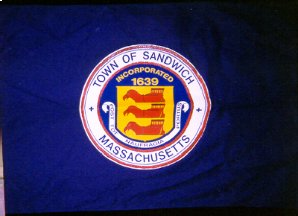
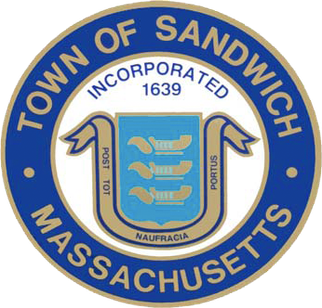
- Flag Seal
- Motto: Post Tot Naufracia Portus (Latin) "After So Many Shipwrecks, a Haven"
- Location in Barnstable County, Massachusetts
- Coordinates: 41°45′32″N 70°29′40″W
- Country: United States
- State: Massachusetts
- County: Barnstable
- Settled: 1637
- Incorporated: September 3, 1639

Government
  - Type: Open town meeting
  - Town Administrator: Bud Dunham

Area
  - Total: 44.2 sq mi (114.5 km^{2})
  - Land: 42.7 sq mi (110.7 km^{2})
  - Water: 1.5 sq mi (3.8 km^{2})
- Elevation: 20 ft (6 m)

Population (2020)
  - Total: 20,259
  - Density: 470/sq mi (183/km^{2})
- Time zone: UTC−5 (Eastern)
  - Summer (DST): UTC−4 (Eastern)
- ZIP Codes: 02537 (East Sandwich); 02542 (Otis ANGB); 02563 (Sandwich); 02644 (Forestdale)
- Area codes: 508, 774
- FIPS code: 25-59735
- GNIS feature ID: 0618259
- Website: www.sandwichmass.org

Sandwich is a town on Cape Cod in Massachusetts and is its oldest town. The town motto is Post tot Naufracia Portus, Latin for "after so many shipwrecks, a haven". The population was 20,259 at the 2020 census.

== History ==
Cape Cod was inhabited by American Indians prior to European colonization. Sandwich was occupied by the Eastern Algonquian speaking Wampanoag tribe who aided the Pilgrims of Plymouth Colony in the 1620s. The Mashpee Wampanoag Tribe still live on Cape Cod and are making efforts to revive the Wampanoag language.

A group of settlers from Saugus, Massachusetts, colonized Sandwich in 1637 with the permission of the Plymouth Colony. It is named for the seaport of Sandwich, Kent, in England. (Note: Research by Sandwich's first town archivist found that "circumstantial evidence was pointed strongly" that the naming of the town in Massachusetts for the seaport in England came via John Humphrey (c. 1597 – 1661), a Deputy Governor of the Massachusetts Bay Colony.) It was incorporated in 1639 and is the oldest town on Cape Cod, together with Yarmouth. The western portion of the town was separated from the original Town of Sandwich and became the town of Bourne in 1884.

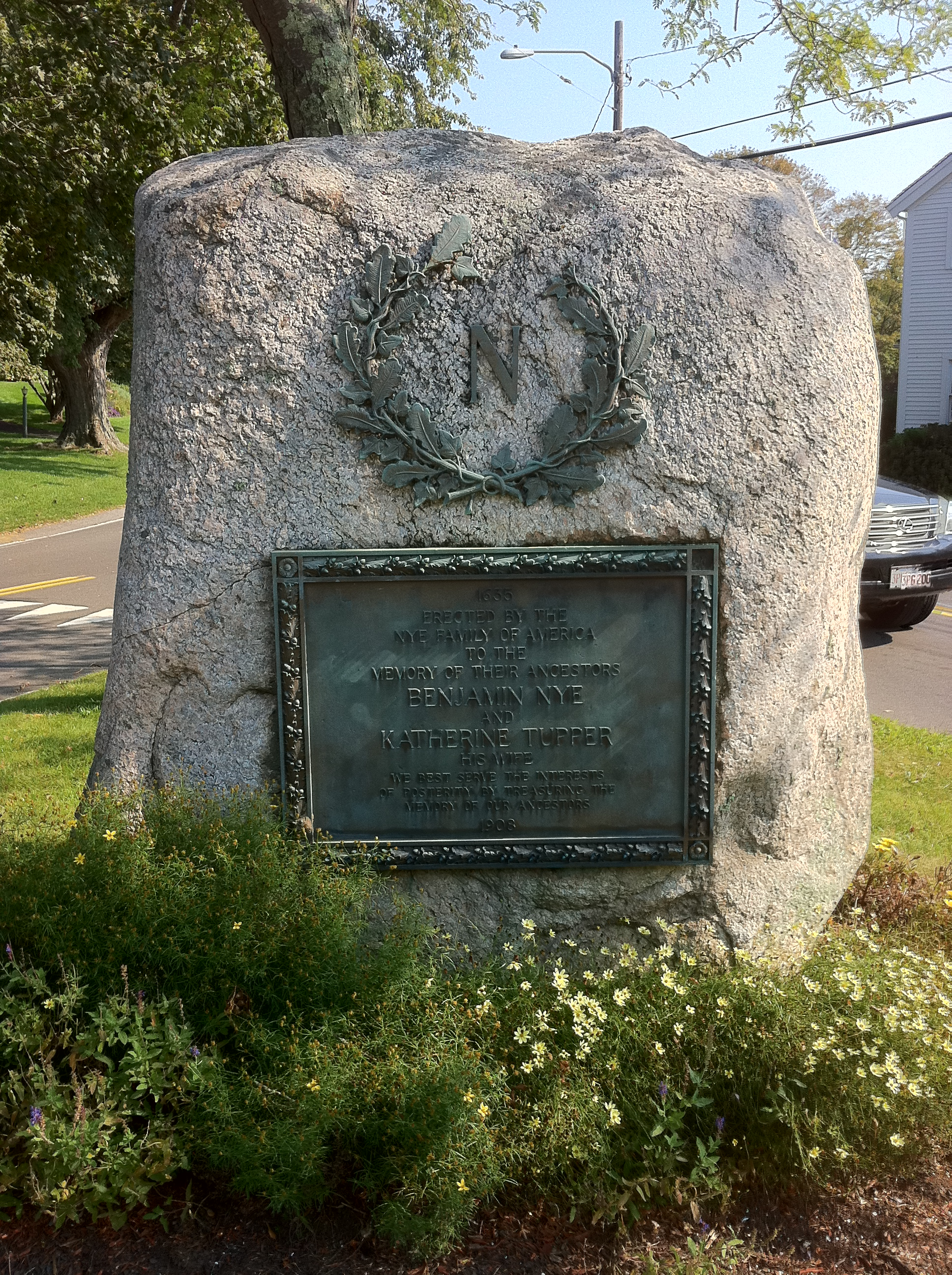
Memorial to Benjamin Nye and Katherine Tupper

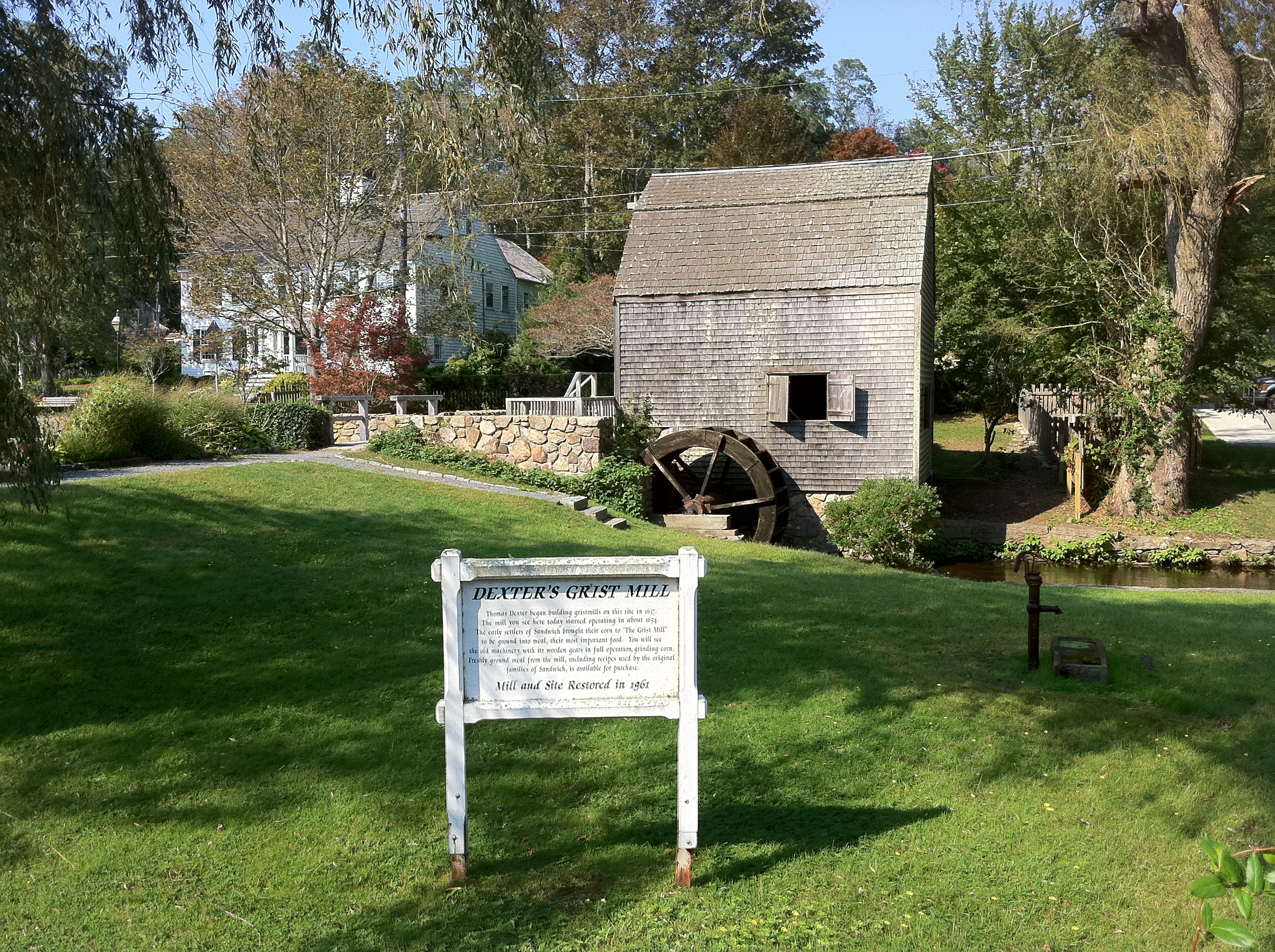
Dexter's Grist Mill

Sandwich was the site of an early Quaker settlement and today hosts the oldest continuous Quaker Meeting in the U.S.

Early industry revolved around agriculture, with fishing and trading also providing for the town. Later, the town grew a small industrial component along the Scusset River and Old Harbor Creek and its tributaries. Today, most of its economy is centered on tourism.

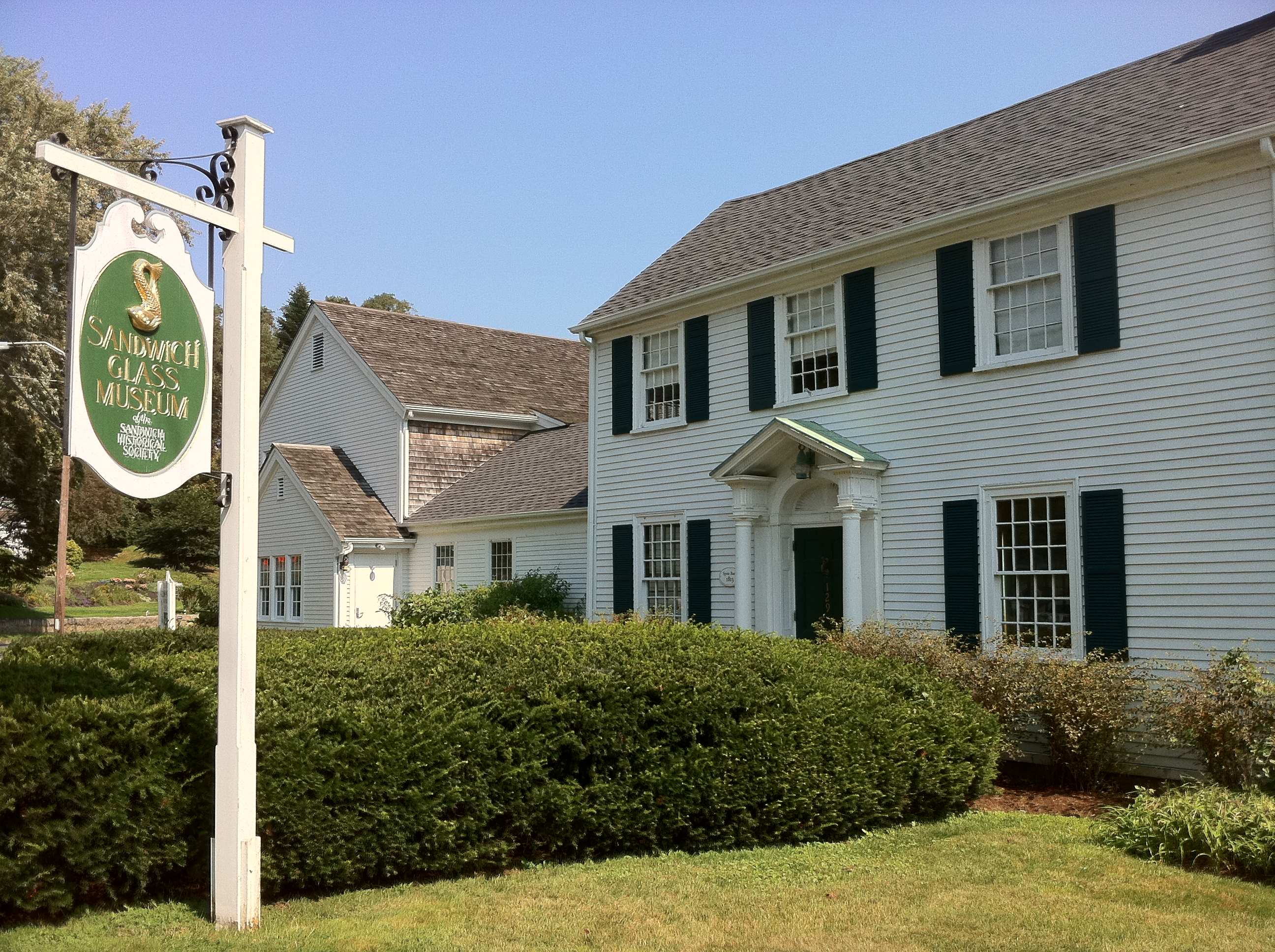
Sandwich Glass Museum

Deming Jarves founded the Boston & Sandwich Glass Factory in 1825. Sandwich had proximity to a shallow harbor, was a possible canal site, and had local supplies of timber to fuel the furnaces. The glass works primarily made lead glass and was known for its use of color. Jarves received several patents for his improvements in glass mold designs and pressing techniques. The factory declined after the Civil War due to competition from Ohio, Pennsylvania, and West Virginia companies that produced less expensive pressed soda-lime glass tableware.

The Cape Cod Canal was constructed through the town starting in 1909, opening for travel in 1914. The Canal Generating Plant went online in 1968.

== Geography ==
According to the United States Census Bureau, the town has a total area of 44.2 square miles (114.5 km^{2}), of which 42.7 square miles (110.7 km^{2}) is land and 1.5 square miles (3.8 km^{2}), or 3.32%, is water. Sandwich is bordered by Cape Cod Bay to the north, Barnstable to the east, Mashpee and Falmouth to the south, and Bourne to the west. It is approximately 57 miles (92 km) south-southeast of Boston.

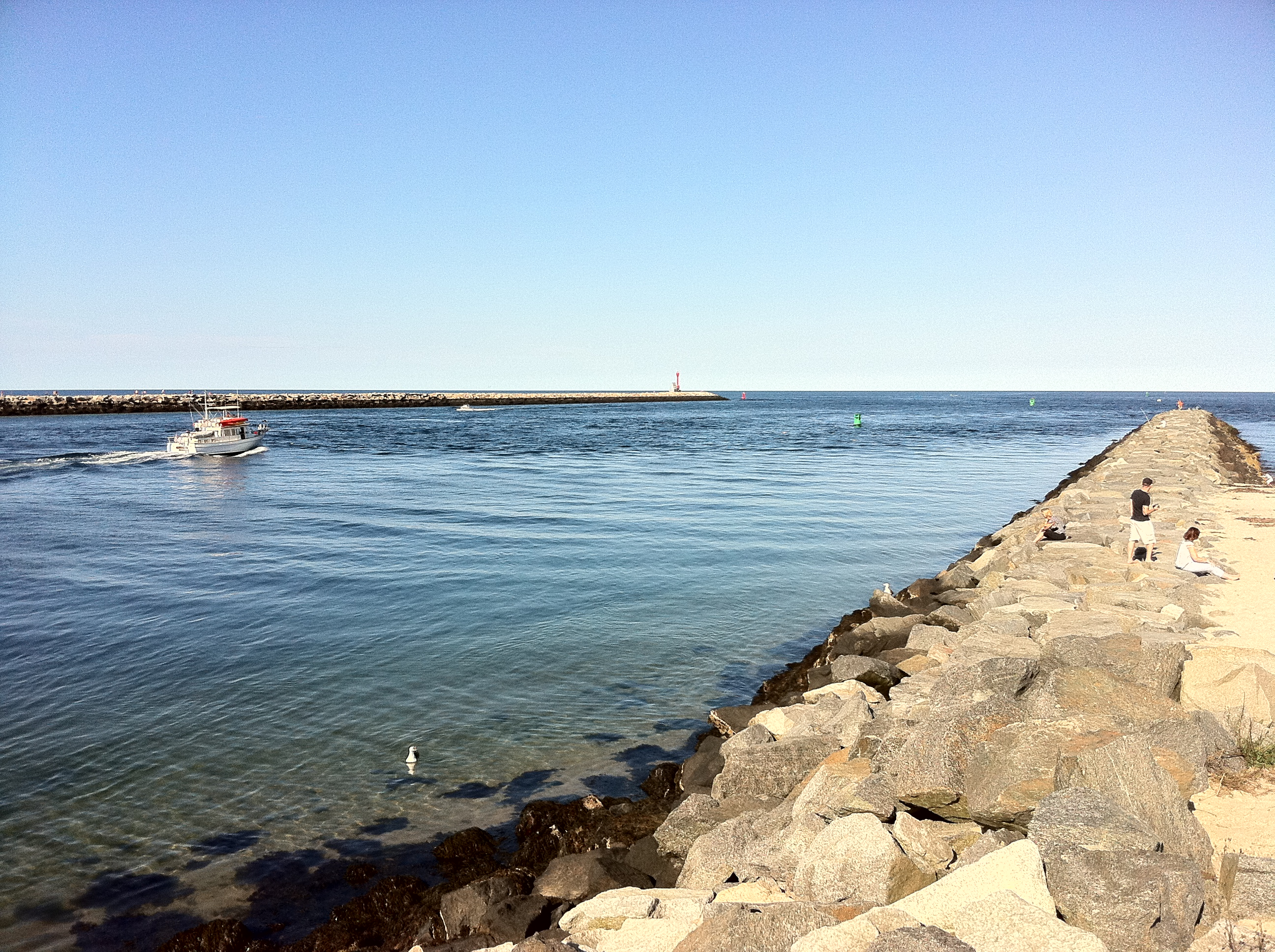
East entrance to the Cape Cod Canal

Sandwich is the site of the Cape Cod Bay entrance to the Cape Cod Canal. The northern point of Sandwich, where Sagamore Hill and Scusset Beach State Reservation lie, is divided from the rest of the town by the canal. The town is also the location of the Shawme-Crowell State Forest and the Massachusetts State Game Farm. The town is home to six beaches along the shores of Cape Cod Bay. The rest of the town's geography is typical of the rest of the Cape, with many small ponds and hills, with most of the trees being pine or oak. Sandwich is also the site of Old Harbor Creek, a large inlet with several other small creeks feeding it, which once served to provide a safe harbor for ships.

== Climate ==
According to the Köppen climate classification system, Sandwich, Massachusetts has a warm-summer, wet year-round, humid continental climate (Dfb). Dfb climates are characterized by at least one month having an average mean temperature ≤ 32.0 °F (≤ 0.0 °C), at least four months with an average mean temperature ≥ 50.0 °F (≥ 10.0 °C), all months with an average mean temperature ≤ 71.6 °F (≤ 22.0 °C), and no significant precipitation difference between seasons. The average seasonal (Nov–Apr) snowfall total is approximately 30 inches (76 cm). The average snowiest month is February, which corresponds with the annual peak in nor'easter activity. According to the United States Department of Agriculture, the plant hardiness zone is 6b, with an average annual extreme minimum air temperature of −0.7 °F (−18.2 °C).

Climate data for Sandwich, Barnstable County, Massachusetts (1981–2010 averages)
Month	Jan	Feb	Mar	Apr	May	Jun	Jul	Aug	Sep	Oct	Nov	Dec	Year
Mean daily maximum °F (°C)	37.4 (3.0)	39.2 (4.0)	44.9 (7.2)	53.8 (12.1)	63.8 (17.7)	72.9 (22.7)	78.7 (25.9)	77.9 (25.5)	71.3 (21.8)	61.4 (16.3)	52.7 (11.5)	42.9 (6.1)	58.2 (14.6)
Daily mean °F (°C)	29.3 (−1.5)	31.2 (−0.4)	37.0 (2.8)	45.8 (7.7)	55.4 (13.0)	65.0 (18.3)	71.0 (21.7)	70.3 (21.3)	63.4 (17.4)	53.2 (11.8)	44.6 (7.0)	35.0 (1.7)	50.2 (10.1)
Mean daily minimum °F (°C)	21.3 (−5.9)	23.1 (−4.9)	29.0 (−1.7)	37.7 (3.2)	46.9 (8.3)	57.0 (13.9)	63.4 (17.4)	62.7 (17.1)	55.5 (13.1)	45.0 (7.2)	36.6 (2.6)	27.1 (−2.7)	42.2 (5.7)
Average precipitation inches (mm)	4.12 (105)	3.51 (89)	5.14 (131)	4.45 (113)	3.42 (87)	3.84 (98)	3.34 (85)	3.92 (100)	3.85 (98)	4.23 (107)	4.50 (114)	4.53 (115)	48.85 (1,241)
Average relative humidity (%)	68.2	67.2	65.7	66.3	69.3	73.4	75.1	75.3	75.7	72.8	69.7	69.4	70.7
Average dew point °F (°C)	20.1 (−6.6)	21.6 (−5.8)	26.6 (−3.0)	35.2 (1.8)	45.5 (7.5)	56.3 (13.5)	62.7 (17.1)	62.1 (16.7)	55.6 (13.1)	44.7 (7.1)	35.3 (1.8)	26.0 (−3.3)	41.1 (5.1)
Source: PRISM Climate Group

== Ecology ==
According to the A. W. Kuchler U.S. Potential natural vegetation Types, Sandwich, Massachusetts would primarily contain a Northeastern Oak/Pine (110) vegetation type with a Southern Mixed Forest (26) vegetation form.

== Transportation ==
U.S. Route 6, also known as the Mid-Cape Highway on Cape Cod, passes through the town to the north of Otis Air National Guard Base as a four-lane divided freeway. There are three exits off this route within town. Massachusetts Route 6A passes through town to the north of Route 6, and is the town's main local road. The northern terminus of Massachusetts Route 130 is near the intersection of Routes 6 and 6A within town. The road passes along the eastern side of Otis on its way towards Mashpee.

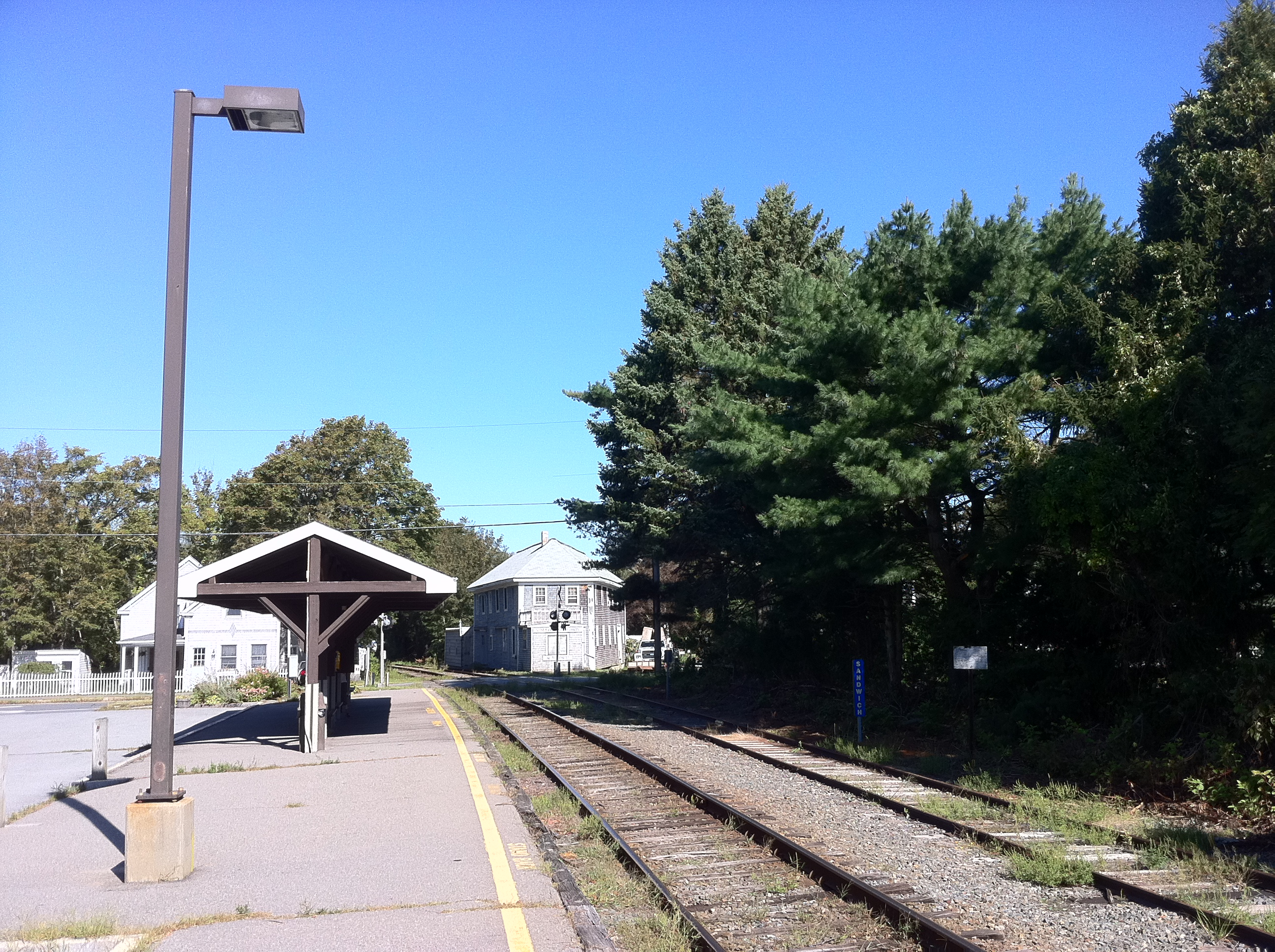
Sandwich station

Freight rail service is provided by the Massachusetts Coastal Railroad. The Cape Cod Central Railroad, which operates seasonal tourist excursions from Hyannis to Buzzards Bay, serves Sandwich via a station in the western section of the town. The nearest MBTA Commuter Rail stations are Kingston and Middleborough. There is also seasonal passenger rail available in nearby Hyannis and Bourne via the CapeFlyer. The nearest inter-city (Amtrak) passenger rail stations are Boston's South Station and Providence.

The town was one that had been served by Amtrak's Cape Codder train service (1986–1996); however, it has been eliminated from the schedule of the seasonal Cape Flyer train service. From the 19th century, under the Old Colony Railroad, and until 1964 under the New York, New Haven and Hartford Railroad, passenger trains served Sandwich. Trains of the 1940s–1960s included the Day Cape Codder and the Neptune.

The nearest private and regional air service can be found in Barnstable, and the nearest national and international airport is Logan International Airport in Boston.

== Demographics ==
Historical population
Year	Pop.	±%
1790	1,991	—
1850	4,368	+119.4%
1860	4,479	+2.5%
1870	3,694	−17.5%
1880	3,543	−4.1%
1890	1,819	−48.7%
1900	1,448	−20.4%
1910	1,688	+16.6%
1920	1,458	−13.6%
1930	1,437	−1.4%
1940	1,360	−5.4%
1950	2,418	+77.8%
1960	2,082	−13.9%
1970	5,239	+151.6%
1980	8,727	+66.6%
1990	15,489	+77.5%
2000	20,136	+30.0%
2010	20,675	+2.7%
2020	20,259	−2.0%
2024*	20,507	+1.2%
Source: * = population estimate.

As of the census of 2000, there were 20,136 people, 7,335 households, and 5,515 families residing in the town. The population density was 467.9 inhabitants per square mile (180.7/km^{2}). There were 8,748 housing units at an average density of 78.5 persons/km^{2} (203.3 persons/sq mi). The racial makeup of the town was 97.75% White, 0.38% African American, 0.31% Native American, 0.54% Asian, 0.01% Pacific Islander, 0.32% from other races, and 0.69% from two or more races. Hispanic or Latino of any race were 0.80% of the population.

There were 7,335 households, out of which 38.1% had children under the age of 18 living with them, 65.0% were married couples living together, 8.1% had a female householder with no husband present, and 24.8% were non-families. 20.0% of all households were made up of individuals, and 8.9% had someone living alone who was 65 years of age or older. The average household size was 2.72 and the average family size was 3.18.

In the town, the population was spread out, with 28.4% under the age of 18, 4.9% from 18 to 24, 27.7% from 25 to 44, 25.3% from 45 to 64, and 13.7% who were 65 years of age or older. The median age was 40 years. For every 100 females, there were 94.5 males. For every 100 females age 18 and over, there were 89.2 males.

The median income for a household in the town was $61,250 and the median income for a family was $66,553. Males had a median income of $49,195 versus $33,516 for females. The per capita income for the town was $26,895. About 2.2% of families and 3.1% of the population were below the poverty line, including 3.3% of those under the age of 18 and 4.1% ages 65 years or older.

== Government ==
Sandwich is represented by State Representative Steven Xiarhos in the Massachusetts House of Representatives as a part of the Fifth Barnstable District, which also includes portions of Barnstable, Bourne and Plymouth. The town is represented by State Senator Dylan Fernandez in the Massachusetts Senate as a part of the Plymouth and Barnstable district, which includes Bourne, Falmouth, Kingston, Pembroke, Plymouth, and Plympton. The town is patrolled by the Sandwich Police Department. The Police Department has 28 full-time staff members, including Chief, Lieutenants, Sergeants, Detectives, Patrol Officers and support staff. The Sandwich Board of Selectmen has five members: Robert George, Shane Hoctor, Susan James, Michael Miller, and David Sampson.

On the national level, Sandwich is a part of Massachusetts's 9th congressional district, and is currently represented by William Keating. The state's junior (Class II) member of the United States Senate is Ed Markey. The senior (Class I) senator is Elizabeth Warren.

Sandwich is governed by the open town meeting form of government. Day-to-day operation is led by a board of selectmen, which appoints a town manager. The town manager is George H. "Bud" Dunham, who has served in that role for more than 30 years. The town operates a police department, and a fire department consisting of three fire stations. There are three post offices in town (East Sandwich, Sandwich, and Forestdale). The Sandwich Public Library is located in the town's center, and belongs to the Old Colony Library Network, the Southeastern Massachusetts Regional Library System, and the Massachusetts Library Information Network. Sandwich has a public access television station (PEG) Sandwich Community TV which archives all government meetings on its website.

Sandwich presidential election results
Year	Democratic	Republican	Third parties	Total Votes	Difference
2020	55.04% 7,739	42.98% 6,044	1.98% 278	14,061	12.05%
2016	48.07% 6,017	46.71% 5,846	5.22% 653	12,516	1.37%
2012	46.73% 5,845	52.05% 6,511	1.22% 153	12,509	5.32%
2008	49.96% 6,126	48.45% 5,942	1.59% 195	12,263	1.50%
2004	49.03% 5,863	50.03% 5,982	0.94% 112	11,957	1.00%
2000	48.67% 5,262	44.86% 4,850	6.47% 700	10,812	3.81%
1996	50.23% 4,870	38.87% 3,768	10.90% 1,057	9,695	11.37%
1992	38.14% 3,460	32.36% 2,936	29.51% 2,677	9,073	5.78%
1988	44.61% 3,462	54.01% 4,191	1.38% 107	7,760	9.39%
1984	38.02% 2,222	61.75% 3,609	0.24% 14	5,845	23.73%
1980	25.72% 1,248	52.57% 2,551	21.72% 1,054	4,853	26.85%
1976	42.69% 1,533	54.11% 1,943	3.20% 115	3,591	11.42%
1972	36.06% 872	63.07% 1,525	0.87% 21	2,418	27.01%
1968	36.72% 527	58.82% 844	4.46% 64	1,435	22.09%
1964	58.43% 683	41.32% 483	0.26% 3	1,169	17.11%
1960	37.37% 410	62.53% 686	0.09% 1	1,097	25.16%
1956	19.98% 194	79.71% 774	0.31% 3	971	59.73%
1952	23.74% 208	76.14% 667	0.11% 1	876	52.40%
1948	31.38% 241	67.19% 516	1.43% 11	768	35.81%
1944	39.23% 264	60.62% 408	0.15% 1	673	21.40%
1940	35.44% 281	64.31% 510	0.25% 2	793	28.88%

Voter Registration and Party Enrollment as of October 15, 2008
Party	Number of Voters	Percentage
Democratic	3,582	22.89%
Republican	3,080	19.68%
Unaffiliated	8,923	57.02%
Libertarian	64	0.41%
Total	15,649	100%

== Education ==
Sandwich operates its own public school system. Forestdale Pre-K–2, Oak Ridge 3–6, STEM Academy 7–8. The STEM Academy is located in the town's High School. Sandwich High School, located in East Sandwich, operates Grades 7–12. The school teams are called the Blue Knights, and their colors are navy blue, Columbia blue, and white.

High school students may also choose to attend the Upper Cape Cod Regional Technical High School in Bourne free of charge (Sandwich taxpayers contribute to that school's budget) as well as Sturgis Charter Public School in Hyannis. Students may also choose to attend private schools in Barnstable, Bourne, Falmouth or other neighboring communities. A few Sandwich students choose to attend private high schools off-Cape, such as Tabor Academy, Sacred Heart High School, and Bishop Stang High School.

== Attractions ==
There are several attractions in Sandwich, including Heritage Museums and Gardens, the Wing Fort House, the Sandwich Glass Museum, the Thornton Burgess Museum, Hoxie House (the oldest house on Cape Cod), the Daniel Webster Inn, the Dexter Grist Mill (the oldest mill on Cape Cod), the Sandwich Friends (Quaker) Meetinghouse (the oldest in North America), and Shawme Lake. Sandwich is home to numerous art galleries, as well as rare book and antique stores. Many of these attractions are found within the Town Hall Square Historic District and Jarvesville Historic District within the town. Sandwich is also home to a major portion of Otis Air National Guard Base, including half the land that the runways are on.

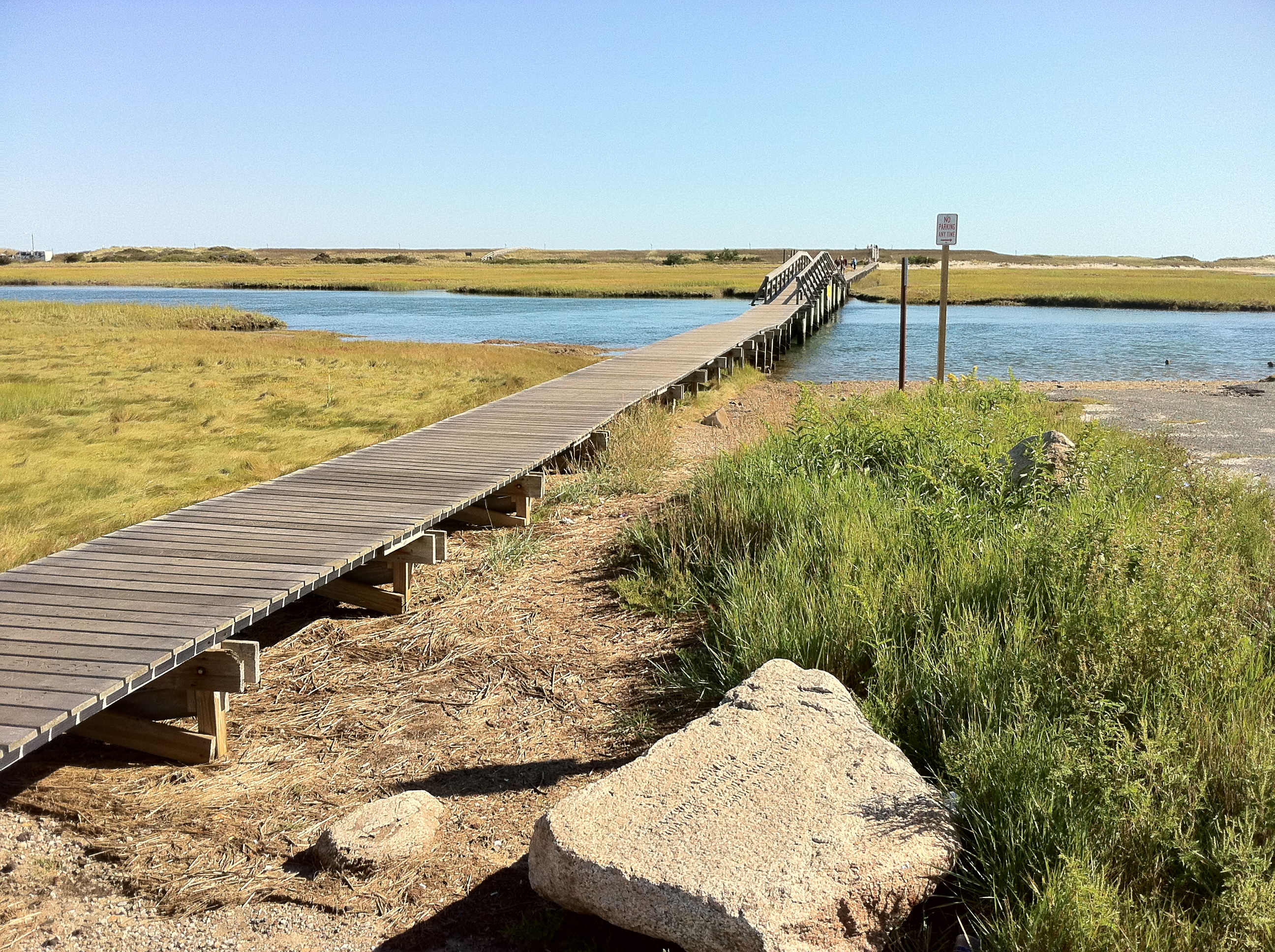
Boardwalk in Sandwich

The Sandwich boardwalk is located in downtown and leads to the Town Beach on Cape Cod Bay. It is a popular tourist attraction and was elected by National Geographic in July 2010 as one of the top ten boardwalks in the United States. It is 1,350 feet long, from Scorton Creek to the Cape Cod Canal, and crossing the Creek Mill and the marsh. It was created in 1875 by Gustavus Howland, the son of Ellis Howland who built the town hall. In 1991, it was almost completely destroyed by Hurricane Bob. It was rebuilt in 1992, financed through the sale of 1,700 personalized planks with engravings. It was damaged by blizzards in March 2018, but was rebuilt and reopened in June 2018.

A winter storm in winter 2021–2022 destroyed many portions of the boardwalk. Amid concerns from beach goers to make the boardwalk handicap accessible, plans to rebuild the boardwalk were put on hold. In fall 2023, the town began reconstruction on a renewed version of the boardwalk, which is expected to reopen to the public in summer 2024.

== Notable people ==
- Abraham Williams (reverend) (1724-1787) — was outspoken about American independence in his sermons.
- Charles Higbee Bridges (1873–1948), Adjutant General of the United States Army 1928–1933
- Thornton Burgess (1874–1965), conservationist and author of the Old Mother West Wind and Bedtime Stories series
- Ed Conley (1864–1894), Major League Baseball pitcher
- Edmund Freeman, one of the town's founders, Deputy Governor of Plymouth Colony under Governor William Bradford and Governor Edward Winslow
- Nathaniel Freeman Jr. (1766–1800), Massachusetts's 5th congressional district Representative for the Democratic-Republican Party 1795–1799 and Massachusetts militia brigade major
- Duff Goldman (born 1974), pastry chef, television personality, and cookbook author; Sandwich High School, Class of 1993
- Bathsheba Spooner (1746-1778), first US woman executed post-Revolutionary War
- Paige Stathopoulos (born 1993), rugby union player
- Willard Woodard (1824–1891), Chicago politician, publisher, and parks advocate
