= North Taunton, Massachusetts =

Unofficial neighborhood in Taunton, Massachusetts

Coordinates: 41°57′22.8″N 71°6′56.4″W

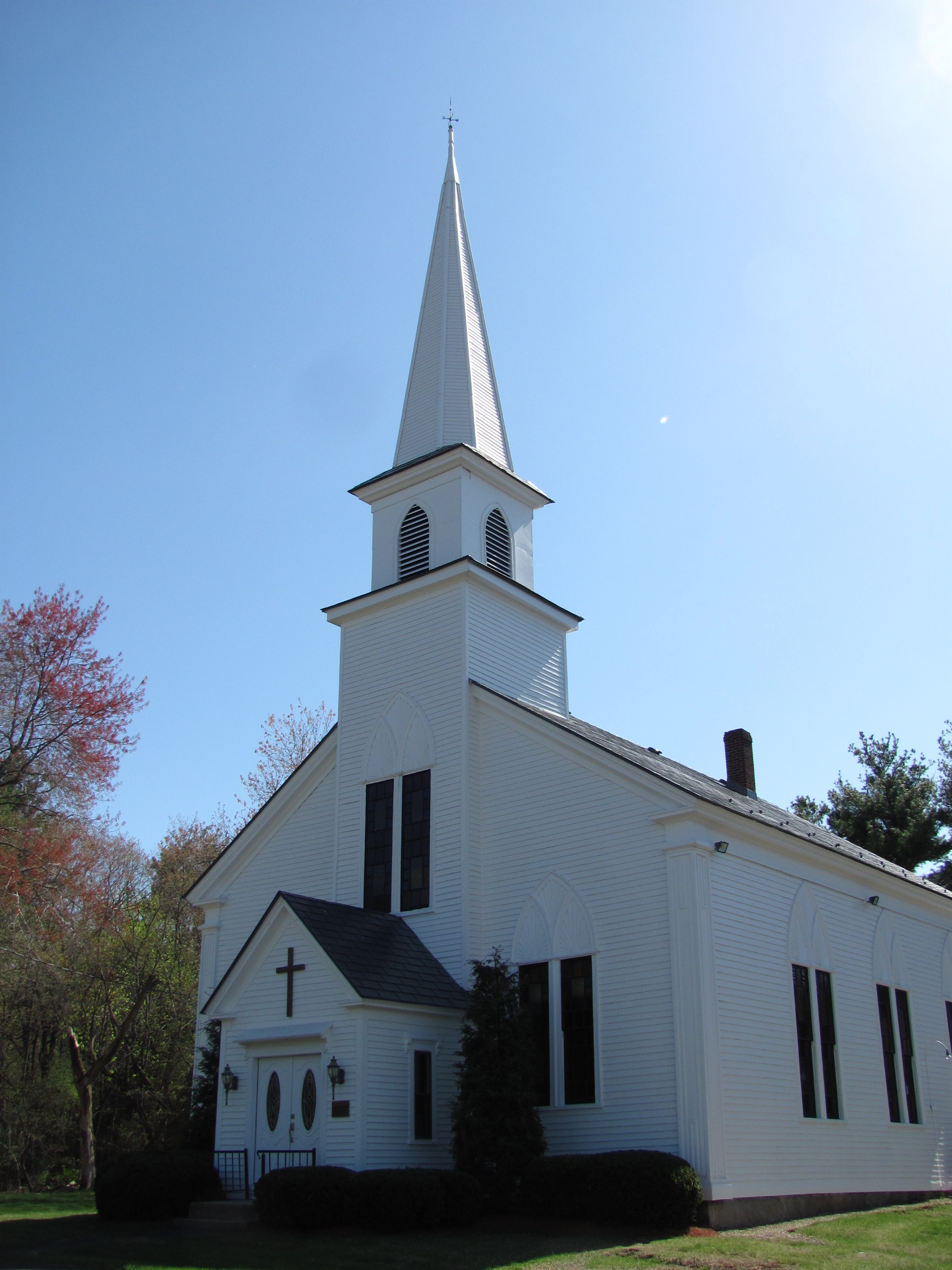
North Taunton Baptist Church

North Taunton is an unofficial neighborhood in the city of Taunton, Massachusetts, United States. It is not a census-designated area, but is considered by local residents as a municipally designated populated region of the city.

== Location ==
North Taunton is located in the northern portion of the city and is bordered by the Whittenton, Whittenton Junction, and Oakland neighborhoods to the south, the towns of Raynham to the east, Norton to the west, and Easton to the north.

== Transportation ==
Interstate 495 is the only major route that passes through the neighborhood, in a northwest–southeast direction. Bay Street is the main access road connecting the neighborhood to the Whittenton neighborhood and the rest of the city.

== Geography ==
A large portion of the Hockomock Swamp Wildlife Management Area is located the northern portions of North Taunton. Lake Sabbatia is the largest body of water in the area and is the source of the Mill River which runs through the downtown region of Taunton. Near the Sabbatia Lake is the Watson Pond State Park.
