= Bay Road (Bristol County, Massachusetts) =

Road in southeastern Massachusetts

- U.S. National Register of Historic Places
- U.S. Historic district
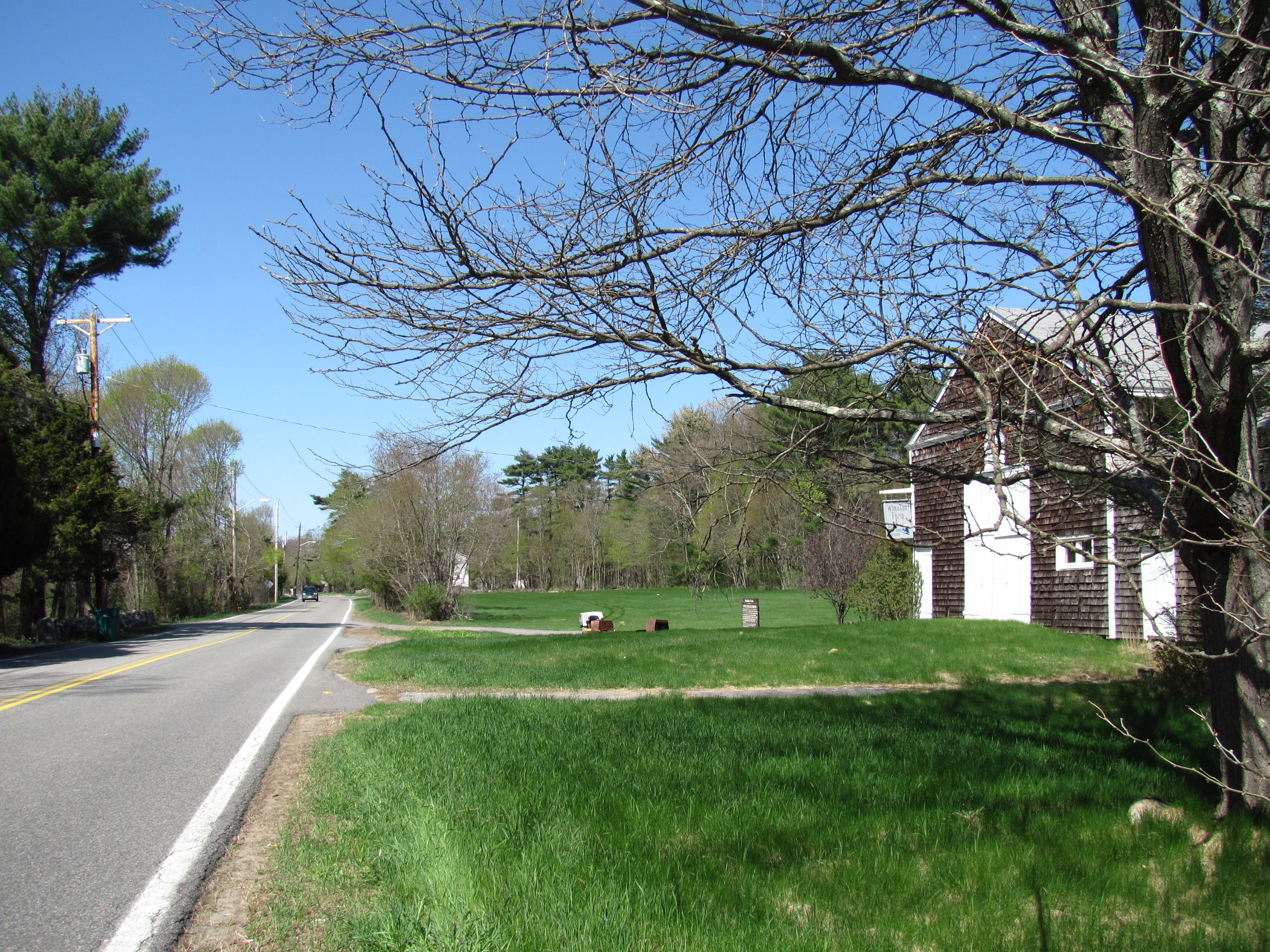
- Bay Road at Wheaton Farm in Easton
- Location: Easton, Massachusetts
- NRHP reference No.: 72000118
- Added to NRHP: May 5, 1972

- Old Bay Road
- U.S. National Register of Historic Places
- U.S. Historic district
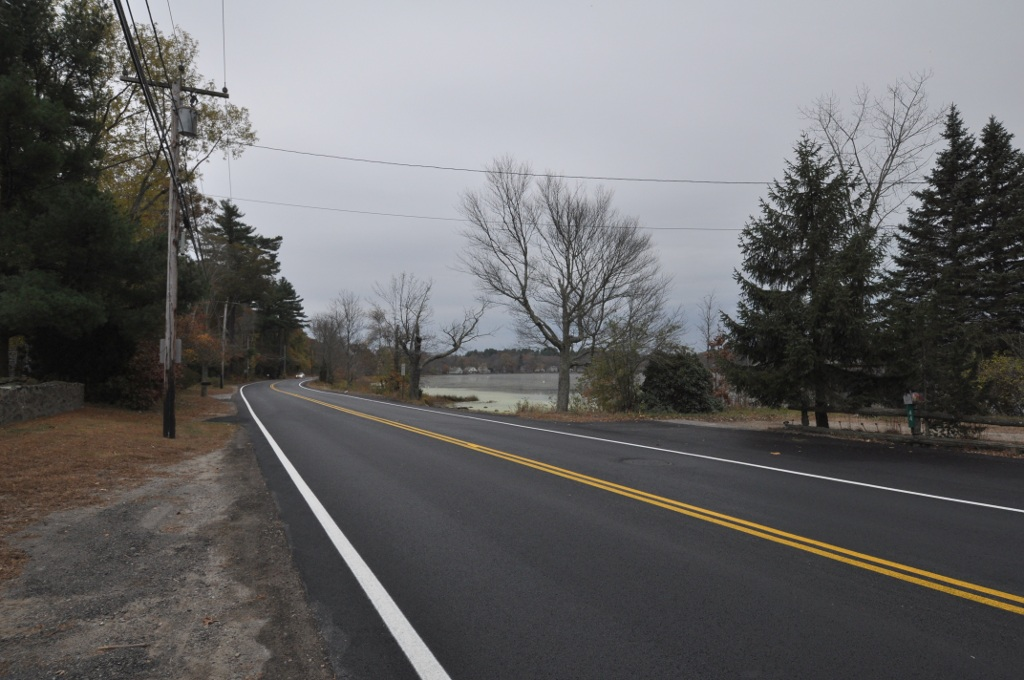
- Bay Road near Winnicunnet Pond in Norton
- Location: Norton, Massachusetts
- Built: 1640
- NRHP reference No.: 74000362
- Added to NRHP: November 8, 1974

Bay Road is a 17.2-mile (27.7 km) north-south road in southeastern Massachusetts. The road is in parts a very old road, dating to colonial times, when it was known as the King's Highway.

Two sections of the road, a portion in Easton (Foundry Street to the Norton town line) and the entire segment in Norton, are listed on the National Register of Historic Places. The Norton section is listed as "Old Bay Road", while that in Easton is listed as "Bay Road". Some of the oldest houses in the region are found along the street, for example the Joseph White House in Norton, which may have been built as early as 1696 by one of the original colonial landowners of the area.

== Route ==
Bay Road begins at the town line of Canton and Sharon, Norfolk County just north of an intersection with Route 27 at Cobb Corner and ends in Taunton as Bay Street. The road heads south along the Sharon side of the Sharon/Stoughton town line in Norfolk County. The road enters Bristol County in the town of Easton. Bay Road runs along the east side of Borderland State Park and passes through the intersection of Routes 106 and 123 in the neighborhood of Five Corners. The road then enters into the town of Norton. There, Bay Road runs along the eastern shore of Winnecunnet Pond just before entering the Taunton neighborhood of North Taunton, where Bay Road becomes Bay Street, and intersects Interstate 495.

The street runs alongside Lake Sabbatia and Watson Pond State Park. It then enters the Whittenton section and terminates at Broadway (Route 138).

== See also ==
- National Register of Historic Places listings in Bristol County, Massachusetts
