= Canoe River =

Coordinates: 41.973°N 71.136°W

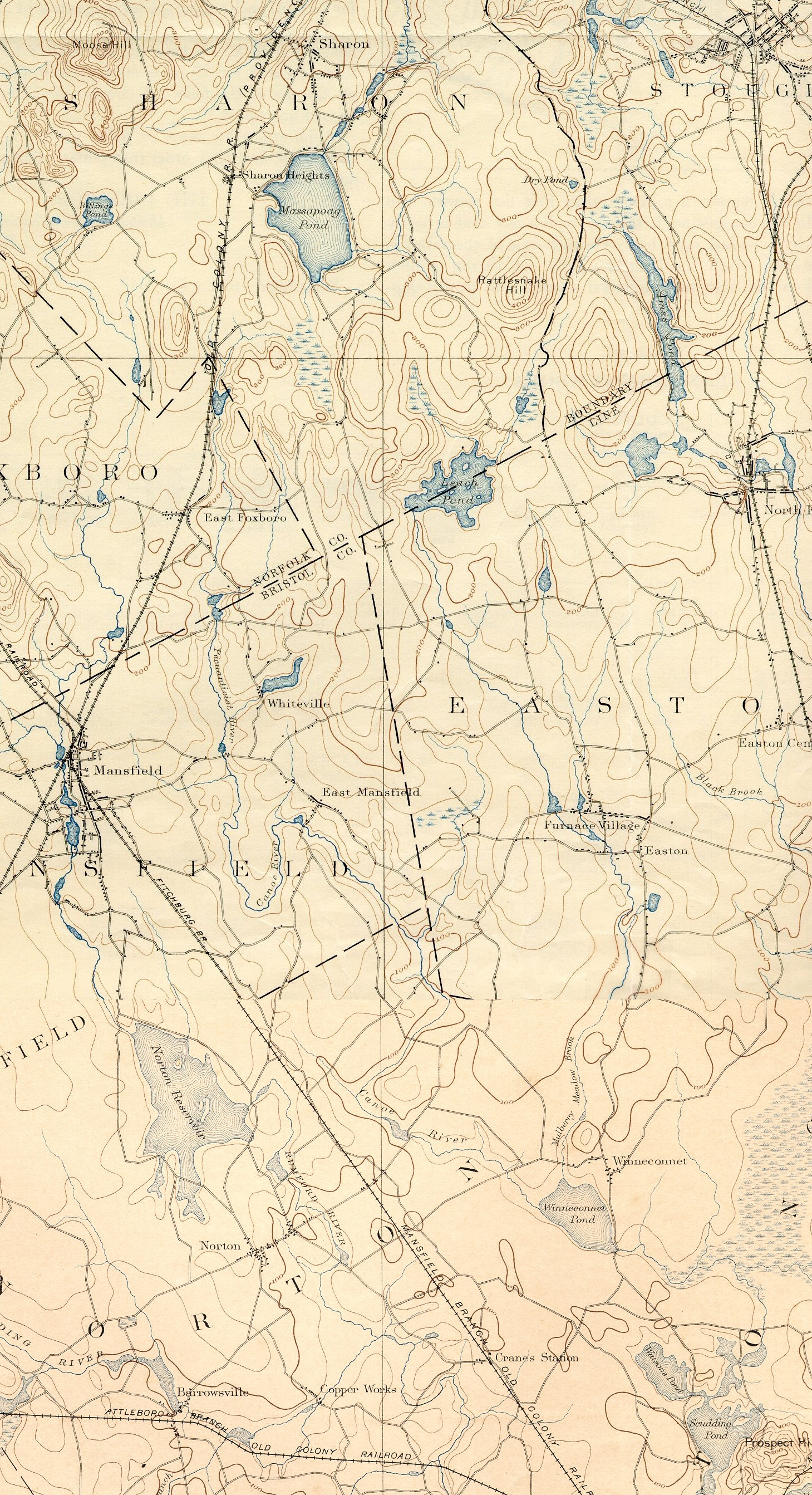
- Canoe River

- Location of mouth

Location
- Country: United States
- State: Massachusetts

Physical characteristics
- Length: 14.4 mi (23.2 km)

The Canoe River is a river in southeastern Massachusetts. It is 14.4 miles (23.2 km) long and part of the Taunton River Watershed.

The Canoe River arises from headwaters near Lake Massapoag in Sharon, and meanders generally southwards through the towns of Sharon, Foxborough, Mansfield, and Easton to empty into Winnecunnet Pond in Norton.

Winnecunnet Pond is emptied by the Snake River which flows into Lake Sabbatia which was formed by damming the Mill River which joins the Taunton River and ultimately empties into Narragansett Bay.

The river provides drinking water for about 50,000 people in the region who receive their water from its aquifer. It has been designated a sole source aquifer and since 1991, an Area of Critical Environmental Concern by the Commonwealth of Massachusetts.

== History ==
The river has a number of earlier names. The section near the headwaters in Sharon were once called Massapoag Brook, and the section in that town alone powered six industrial mills in the nineteenth century.

== See also ==
- Lake Sabbatia
- Watson Pond
- Lake Massapoag
