= Watson Pond =

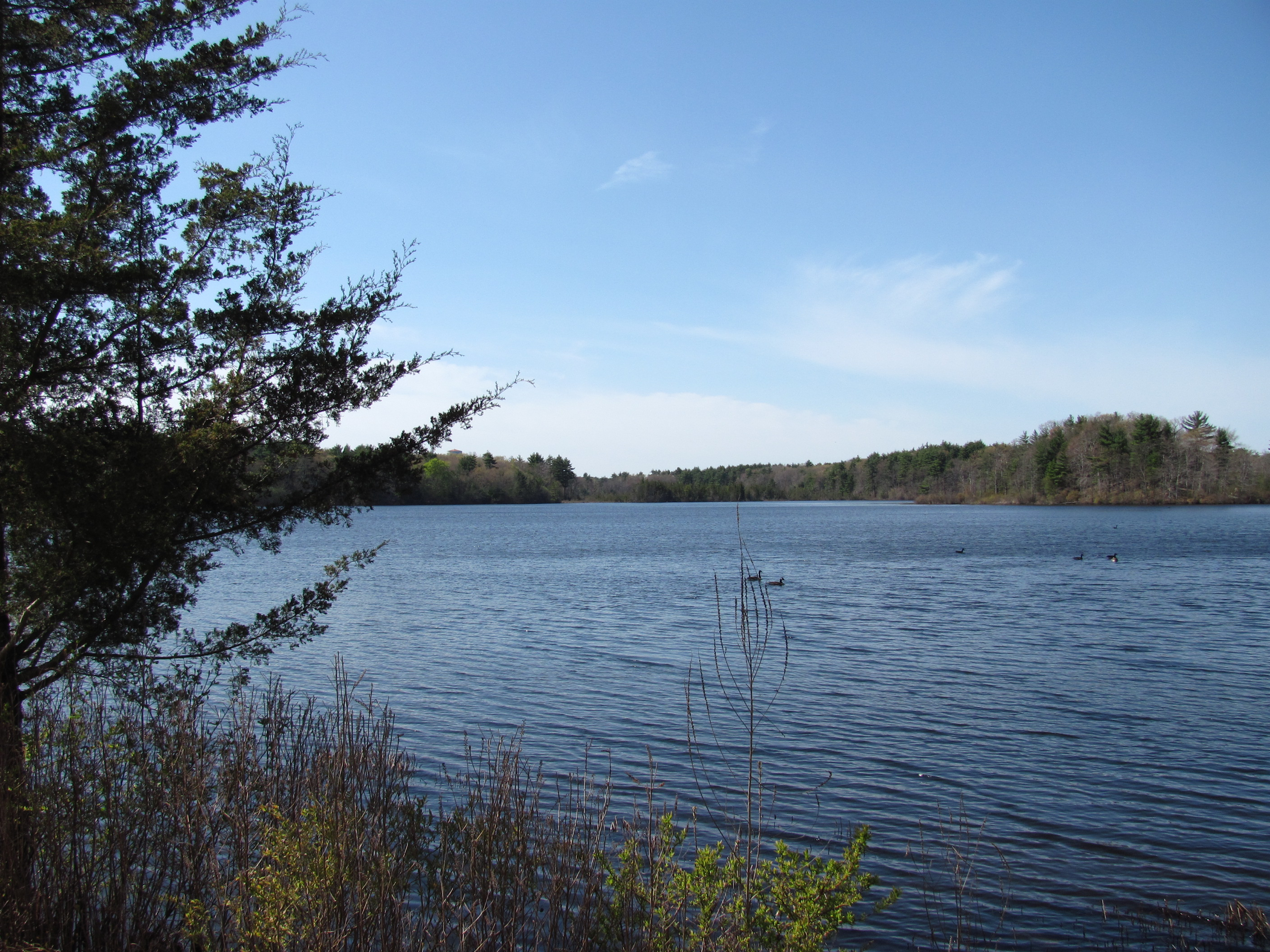
- Watson Pond

- Location within Massachusetts Location within the United States
- Location: Taunton, Massachusetts
- Coordinates: 41°57′00″N 71°07′08″W
- Type: Reservoir
- Basin countries: United States
- Surface elevation: 62 ft (19 m)

Watson Pond is a small freshwater lake within Watson Pond State Park, in Taunton, Massachusetts, United States. The lake is connected to Lake Sabbatia and much of its coastline is forested. The lake is open to the public for swimming and ice fishing.

Since 1991, the Watson Pond has been listed as part of the Canoe River Aquifer Area of Critical Environmental Concern by the Commonwealth of Massachusetts.

== See also ==
- Massasoit State Park
- Mill River
- Taunton, Massachusetts
- Taunton River
