= Snake River (Massachusetts) =

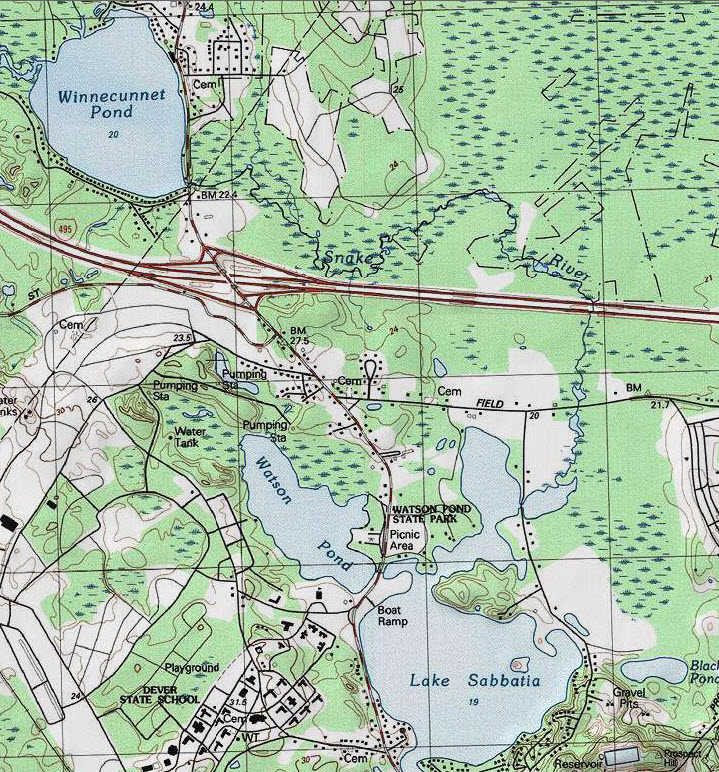
- USGS map of the Snake River and surrounding areas

Location
- Country: United States
- State: Massachusetts

Physical characteristics
- Source: Winnecunnet Pond
  - coordinates: 41.9671°N 71.1265°W
- Mouth: Lake Sabbatia
  - location: Taunton
  - coordinates: 41.9475°N 71.1106°W
- Length: 4 mi (6.4 km)

The Snake River is a small river in Bristol County, Massachusetts. It flows 4.0 miles (6.4 km) from Winnecunnet Pond to Lake Sabbatia in the northern part of Taunton, Massachusetts.

It is part of the Mill River-Taunton River-Narragansett Bay watersheds. The Snake River is part of the Canoe River Aquifer Area of Critical Environmental Concern (Massachusetts) (ACEC).
