= Pocasset River =

Pocasset River may refer to a stream in southern New England in the United States:

- Pocasset River (Massachusetts)
- Pocasset River (Rhode Island)
