= Three Mile River =

River in the United States of America

Coordinates: 41.85427°N 71.10782°W

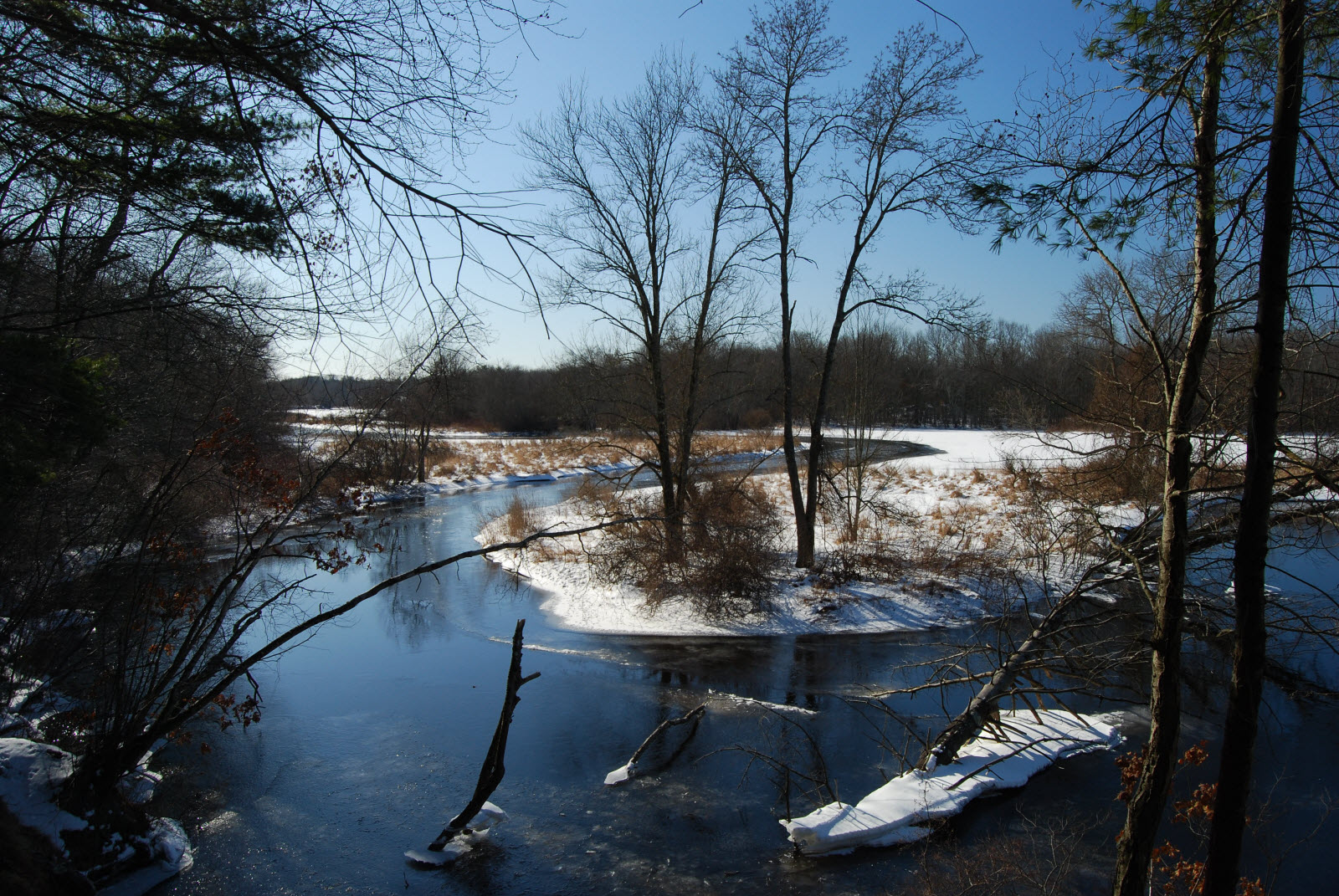
View of Three Mile River in winter

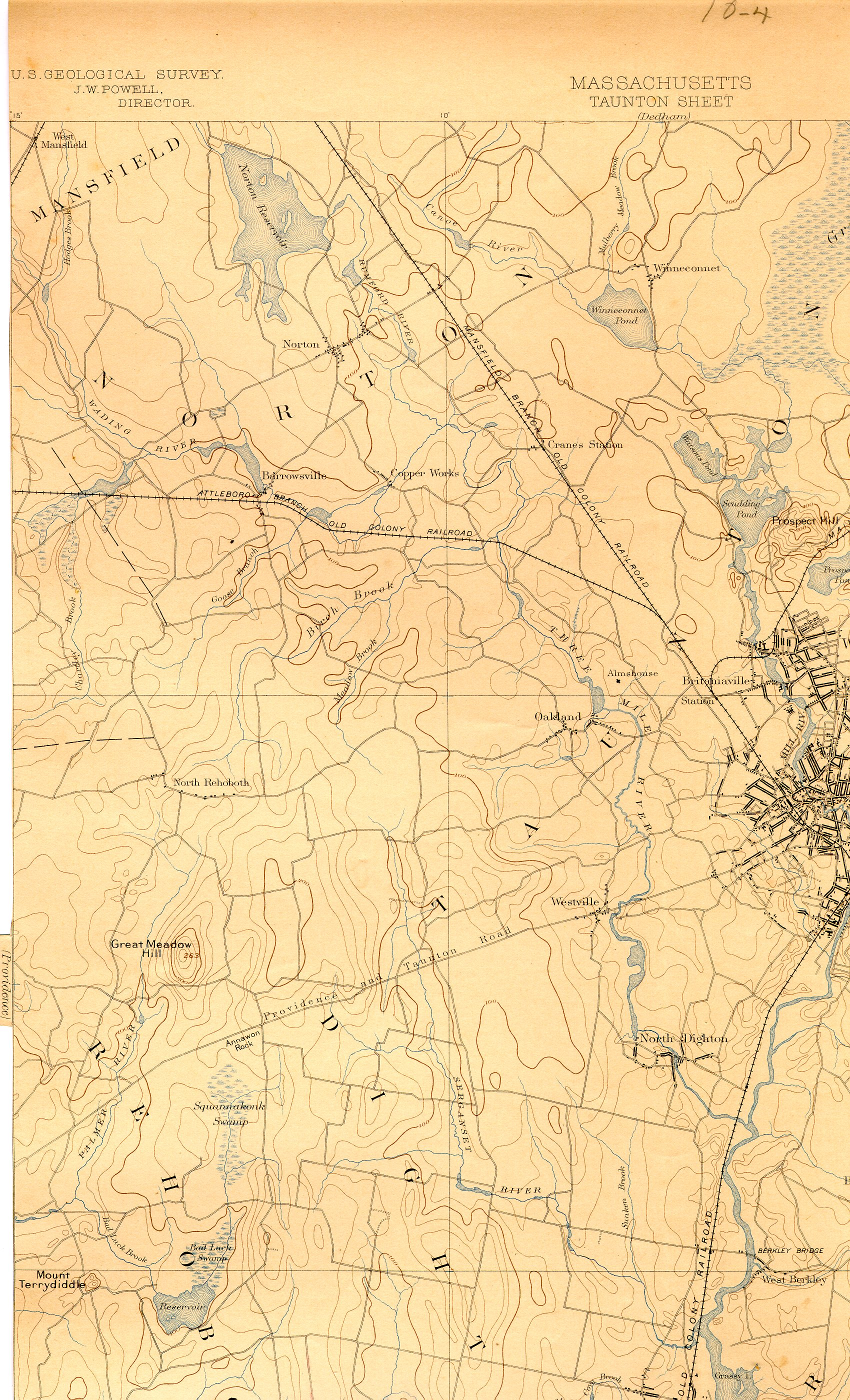
1893 Map of Three Mile River

The Three Mile River or Threemile River is a river in Bristol County, Massachusetts. It is formed by the junction of the Rumford and Wading rivers in the town of Norton. It flows in a southeasterly direction for 13.5 miles (21.7 km) through the towns of Norton, Taunton and Dighton, where it joins the Taunton River.

On August 25, 2008, the Three Mile Watershed was designated an Area of Critical Environmental Concern (ACEC) by the Massachusetts Department of Conservation and Recreation (DCR). The ACEC designation imparts certain protections and restrictions within a designated area relating to new development and other human activities.

== See also ==
- List of Massachusetts rivers
- Taunton River
