= King Phillip's Cave =

King Phillip's Cave can refer to at least two different caves named after Metacomet, the Wampanoag Indian sachem also known as "King Phillip" (or Philip):

- King Phillip's Cave (Massachusetts)
- King Phillip's Cave (Connecticut)
