= Wading River =

Wading River may refer to:

- Wading River (Massachusetts), a tributary of the Three Mile River in southeastern Massachusetts
- Wading River (New Jersey), a tributary of the Mullica River in southern New Jersey
- Wading River, New York, a hamlet in Suffolk County, New York
