= Monument Beach =

Monument Beach may refer to:

- Monument Beach, Massachusetts, is a census-designated place (CDP) in the town of Bourne in Barnstable County, Massachusetts, United States.
  - Monument Beach, a beach there
  - Monument Beach station, a former train station there now used as a private residence
