= Albert Field Tack Company =

- U.S. National Register of Historic Places
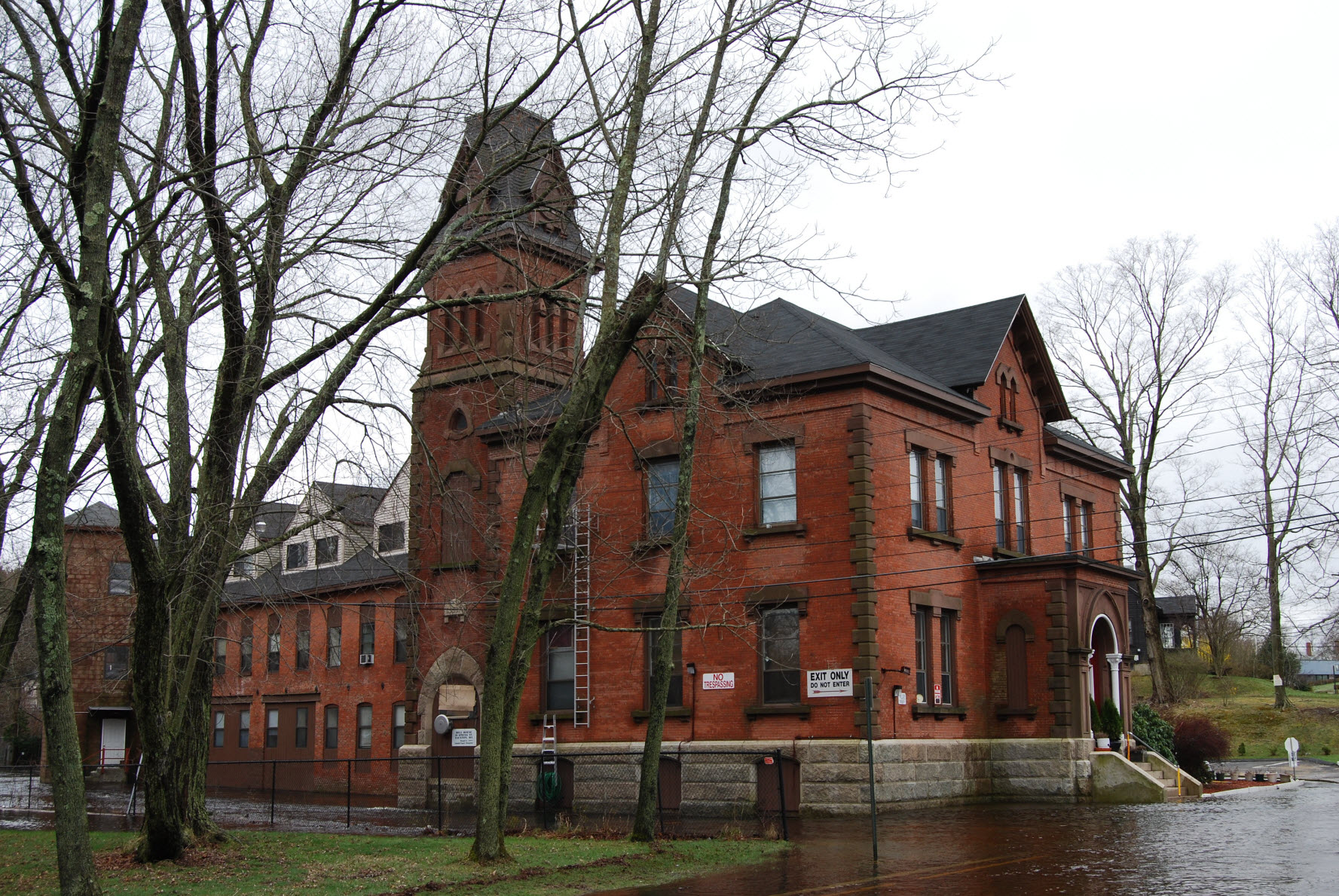

- Location within Massachusetts Location within the United States
- Location: Taunton, Massachusetts
- Coordinates: 41°53′57″N 71°5′29″W
- Built: 1868
- Architectural style: Italianate
- MPS: Taunton MRA
- NRHP reference No.: 84002117
- Added to NRHP: July 5, 1984

The Albert Field Tack Company is a historic industrial site located at 19 Spring Street in Taunton, Massachusetts, next to the Mill River. Built in 1868 for a company founded in the 1820s to manufacture fasteners (tacks and nails), the main office building is an unusually high-style building given its industrial setting. It was added to the National Register of Historic Places in 1984. It has since been converted into apartments.

== Description and history ==
The Albert Field Tack Company is set east of Spring Street and south and west of the Mill River, southeast of Taunton's center. The front-facing main office building is an ornately decorated 2 1/2-story building, with a hip roof pierced by large gabled sections, and a tower at the rear left corner. A series of more utilitarian brick ells extend southeastward toward the river.

The site of the Field Tack Company had seen industrial uses since the early 18th century, when mills for carding and dying wool operated there. The Field Tack Works was established in leased space in Taunton beginning in the 1820s. Albert Field purchased this property in the 1850s, and soon expanded. The ornate office building was built in 1868 in the Italianate stylem reflecting the company's success in the manufacture of upholstery tacks, brads, and shoe nails.

The Field Tack Works later added a second factory in Taunton, and another one in Fairhaven, Massachusetts. The company was acquired by the Atlas Tack Company in 1896. The Spring Street plant closed in 1902. The building was used as a Pentecostal Church in the 1930s, and was later occupied by various businesses.

== See also ==
- National Register of Historic Places listings in Taunton, Massachusetts
