= Rumford River =

River in Massachusetts, US

Coordinates: 41.956°N 71.167°W

The Rumford River is a small river in southeastern Massachusetts, United States, that is a tributary of the Threemile River in the Taunton River watershed. The Rumford River, 23.1 kilometres (14.4 mi) long, begins within the town of Foxborough and flows south through Mansfield to the Norton Reservoir, within the town of Norton, then continues to its confluence with the Wading River to form the Threemile River.
