= Whittenton Pond Dam =

Coordinates: 41.9243°N 71.1065°W

Whittenton Pond Dam or Whittenton Street Dam was a private earthen dam across the Mill River in Taunton, Massachusetts.

Built in 1832, the original dam was a half-mile upstream from downtown Taunton. It was 12 feet high and constructed of timber. It was built of wood in 1832, and flooded Taunton when it failed in 1968.

The dam was purchased during the summer of 2005 by Infinity Holdings, a real-estate development company in the Boston area.

Historically heavy and protracted rains fell on New England beginning October 12, 2005. On the morning of Sunday, October 16, officials realized that the dam was in trouble. The dam was determined to be in imminent danger of failure and of flooding Taunton with a 6-foot (1.8 m) wall of water. On Tuesday, 2,000 residents of the city were evacuated and twenty-one troops from the National Guard were stationed in Taunton. School in Taunton was cancelled, and several roads were closed. Several high-volume pumps were employed to divert water around the dam and drain Whittenton Pond before a catastrophic failure could occur.

Though the wooden dam held, later inspections uncovered extensive structural damage. (The Commonwealth of Massachusetts had last inspected the dam for safety and structural integrity in 2003.) After Whittenton Pond was drained, the old dam was demolished, and a new compressed earth and rock dam was built in its place.

In 2008, the Whittenton Pond Dam was part of a study by the Massachusetts Riverways Program to review the feasibility of dam removals along the Mill River.

The dam was permanently removed in 2013.
