= Murder of Lisa Trubnikova =

2015 murder in Bourne, Massachusetts

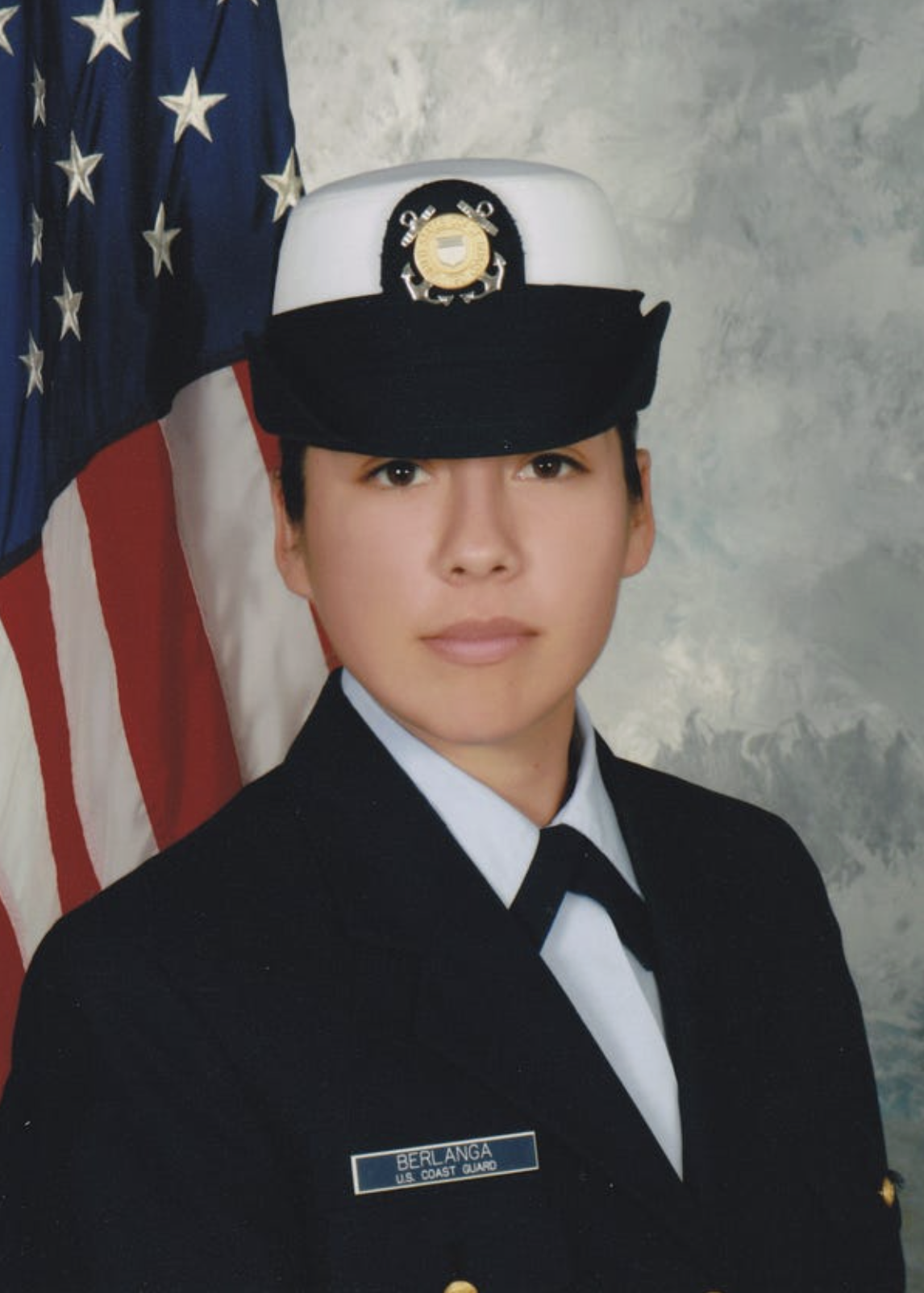
- Trubnikova, then known by her maiden name Berlanga, for the U.S. Coast Guard
- Location: Monument Beach, Massachusetts
- Date: February 5, 2015 c. 2:00 am (UTC−5)
- Attack type: Murder; home invasion
- Deaths: 1
- Injuries: 2
- Victim: Lisa Trubnikova
- Perpetrator: Adrian Loya
- Motive: Revenge
- Verdict: Guilty
- Convictions: Murder; assault and battery against a police officer
- Convicted: Adrian Loya (life imprisonment without the possibility of parole)

On February 5, 2015, Lisa Trubnikova, a 31-year-old United States Coast Guard officer, was murdered by Adrian Loya on his 31st-birthday in Monument Beach, Massachusetts. Trubnikova's wife, Anna, was injured. The perpetrator, Adrian Loya, claimed to have committed the murder in response to Trubnikova sexually assaulting him, while Trubnikova's family claimed that Loya was in love with Trubnikova and jealous of her marriage to Anna. He was found guilty of first-degree murder and sentenced to life imprisonment without the possibility of parole in 2017.

== Background ==
Lisa Berlanga Trubnikova was originally from Midland, Texas. She was a member of the Apostolic Assembly of the Faith in Christ Jesus, but stopped attending the church due to homophobia from other members. She came out as lesbian to her family sometime prior to 2008; they were supportive. In 2008, she joined the United States Coast Guard. At the time of her death, she was married to the then 30-year-old Anna Trubnikova, whose last name she took. They married in New York and moved to Massachusetts soon after. The couple lived in Monument Beach, Massachusetts. At the time of the murder, Trubnikova was stationed in Joint Base Cape Cod and Anna, a petty officer, was stationed in Woods Hole.

Trubnikova met Adrian Thomas Loya in Kodiak, Alaska, when the pair were working for the Coast Guard. Trubnikova's family claimed that Loya had romantic feelings for Trubnikova which were not reciprocated, and he became jealous when she married Anna.

== Murder ==
Adrian Loya began planning the murder in April 2014. A few days before the shooting, Loya wrote a 250-page essay detailing his motives. He drove from his residence at Chesapeake, Virginia, to Monument Beach, where he secretly recorded the couple and monitored them.

At around 2:00 am on February 5, 2015, his 31st-birthday, Loya, armed with multiple firearms, broke into the couple's house and opened fire, killing Trubnikova on the scene and seriously injuring Anna. The couple were in bed together and Anna called the police during the shooting. He recorded the incident with a camera strapped to his body. Loya was initially intercepted by the household cat, who attacked him and slowed him down. At 2:14 am, police were called after a car burst into flames. Another call soon followed, reporting a shooting. The car fire was set by Loya to deter police from the shooting scene.

When police arrived on scene, Loya shot one officer before being apprehended. Anna was taken to a hospital for treatment of her injuries, while Trubnikova was dead at the scene. She had received 11 gunshot wounds.

== Trial ==
Loya was found mentally and physically competent to stand trial. He was charged with over 30 counts, including that of first-degree murder, aggravated assault and battery, armed assault, armed home invasion, and assault and battery on a police officer.

He pled not guilty to all charges. The trial for the murder began on August 28, 2017. Loya claimed that in September 2012, while the pair worked in the Coast Guard, Trubnikova sexually assaulted him. Trubnikova allegedly began masturbating and said "let's do it" to Loya, who was shaken and left. Trubnikova did not touch Loya in any intimate areas. Loya reported her to the Coast Guard, but nothing came of it. He claimed that the shooting was motivated from what he described as the "sexual attack" in Alaska. Loya's lawyer claimed that his client suffered from "mental disease or defect".

Amongst the testimonies were a childhood friend of Loya's and a detective from Chesapeake. In September 2017, Loya was found guilty of first-degree murder and assault and battery on a police officer. He was sentenced to life imprisonment without the possibility of parole.

=== Appeals ===
In 2020, Loya made a bid for a new trial. It was rejected by the Massachusetts Supreme Judicial Court.

== In media ==
The case was the subject of the third episode of season 1 of Love and Hate Crime, "Killer with a Camera".
