= Norton Reservoir =

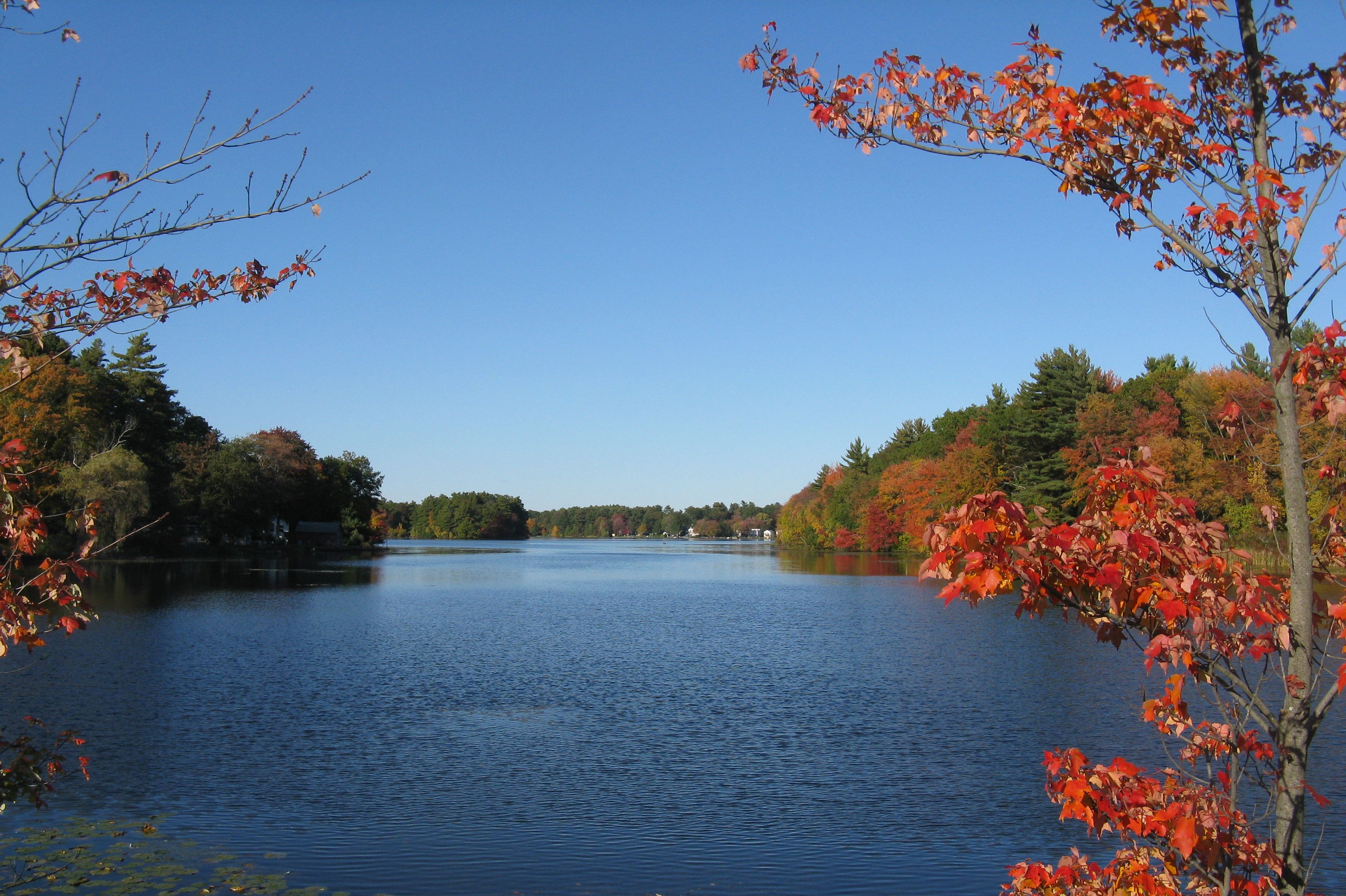
- Norton Reservoir looking north

- Location within Massachusetts Location within the United States
- Location: Norton and Mansfield, Massachusetts
- Coordinates: 41°59′00″N 71°11′22″W
- Type: reservoir
- Primary inflows: Rumford River
- Basin countries: United States
- Average depth: 3–4 ft (0.91–1.22 m)
- Max. depth: 10 ft (3.0 m)
- Surface elevation: 105 ft (32 m)

The Norton Reservoir is a lake/reservoir/pond within the towns of Norton and Mansfield, in southeastern Massachusetts. The Rumford River empties out into the reservoir.
