= Area of Critical Environmental Concern (Massachusetts) =

The Massachusetts Area of Critical Environmental Concern (ACEC) Program is a list of state-designated places within the Commonwealth that receive special attention due to their natural and cultural resources. The program was established in 1975 and includes a list of thirty ACECs covering over 268,000 acres in seventy six communities throughout the state. The ACEC Program is administered by the Department of Conservation and Recreation (DCR) on behalf of the Secretary of Energy and Environmental Affairs.

== List of ACECs in Massachusetts ==
Ref#	ACEC Name	Image	Area (acres)	Designated	Location	Notes
1	Bourne Back River		1,850	1989	Bourne	
2	Canoe River Aquifer and Associated Areas		17,200	1991	Easton, Foxborough, Mansfield, Norton, Sharon, and Taunton	Includes Watson Pond, Lake Sabbatia, and the Snake River
3	Cedar Swamp		1,650	1975	Hopkinton	
4	Central Nashua River Valley		12,900	1996	Bolton, Harvard, Lancaster, and Leominster	
5	Cranberry Brook Watershed		1,050	1983	Braintree and Holbrook	
6	Ellisville Harbor		600	1980	Plymouth	
7	Fowl Meadow and Ponkapoag Bog		8,350	1992	Boston, Canton, Dedham, Milton, Norwood, Randolph, Sharon, and Westwood	
8	Golden Hills		500	1987	Melrose, Saugus, and Wakefield	
9	Great Marsh		25,500	1979	Essex, Gloucester, Ipswich, Newbury, and Rowley	originally designated as Parker River/Essex Bay
10	Herring River Watershed		4,450	1991	Bourne and Plymouth	
11	Hinsdale Flats Watershed		14,500	1992	Dalton, Hinsdale, Peru, and Washington	
12	Hockomock Swamp		16,950	1990	Bridgewater, Easton, Norton, Raynham, Taunton, and West Bridgewater	
13	Inner Cape Cod Bay		2,600	1985	Brewster, Eastham, and Orleans	
14	Kampoosa Bog Drainage Basin		1,350	1995	Lee and Stockbridge	
15	Karner Brook Watershed		7,000	1992	Egremont and Mount Washington	
16	Miscoe, Warren, and Whitehall Watersheds		8,700	2000	Grafton, Hopkinton, and Upton	
17	Neponset River Estuary		1,300	1995	Boston, Milton, and Quincy	
18	Petapawag		25,680	2002	Ayer, Dunstable, Groton, Pepperell, and Tyngsborough	Lower Nashua River and Salmon Brook areas.
19	Pleasant Bay		9,240	1987	Brewster, Chatham, Harwich, and Orleans	
20	Pocasset River		160	1980	Bourne	
21	Rumney Marshes		2,800	1988	Boston, Lynn, Revere, Saugus, and Winthrop	
22	Sandy Neck Barrier Beach System		9,130	1978	Barnstable and Sandwich	
23	Schenob Brook Drainage Basin		13,750	1990	Mount Washington and Sheffield	
24	Squannassit		37,420	2002	Ashby, Ayer, Groton, Harvard, Lancaster, Lunenburg, Pepperell, Shirley, and Townsend	Squannacook River and Mulpus Brook areas.
25	Three Mile River Watershed		14,280	2008	Dighton, Norton, Taunton	
26	Upper Housatonic River		12,280	2009	Lee, Lenox, Pittsfield, Washington	
27	Waquoit Bay		2,580	1979	Falmouth and Mashpee	
28	Weir River		950	1986	Cohasset, Hingham, and Hull	
29	Wellfleet Harbor		12,480	1989	Eastham, Truro, and Wellfleet	
30	Weymouth Back River		800	1982	Hingham and Weymouth	
