= Back River (Buzzards Bay) =

River in Massachusetts, USA

Coordinates: 41.7279°N 70.6153°W

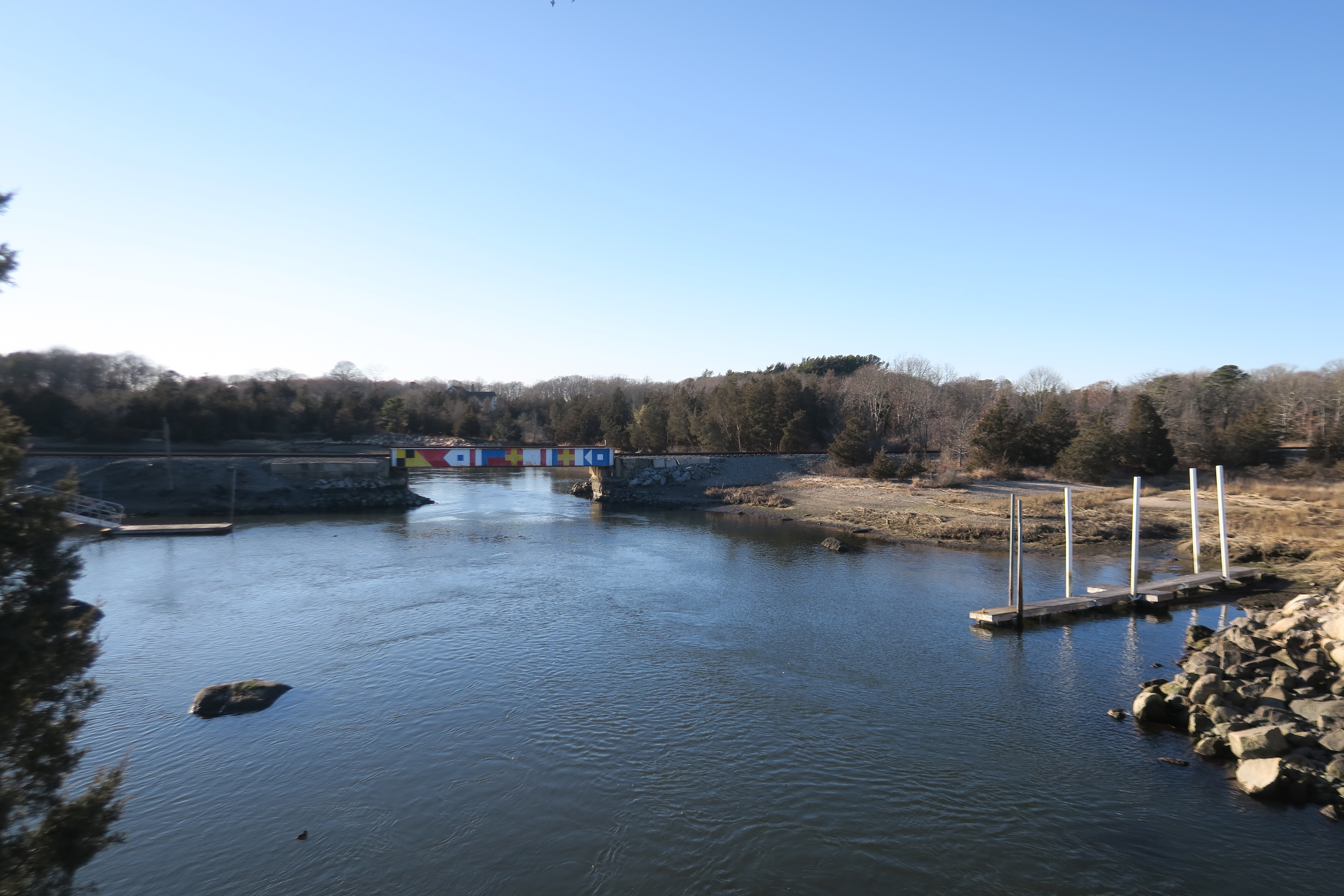
Back River

Back River is a small tidal estuary in Bourne, Massachusetts on the eastern shore of Buzzards Bay. It lies just south of the Cape Cod Canal near the village of Monument Beach. It is separated from Buzzards Bay by Phinneys Harbor. The river's length is 2.1 miles (3.4 km).

Since 1989, Back River has been listed as an Area of Critical Environmental Concern by the Commonwealth of Massachusetts.

== See also ==
- Pocasset River
