= Pocasset River (Massachusetts) =

River in Massachusetts, United States

Coordinates: 41°41′58.90″N 70°37′25.57″W

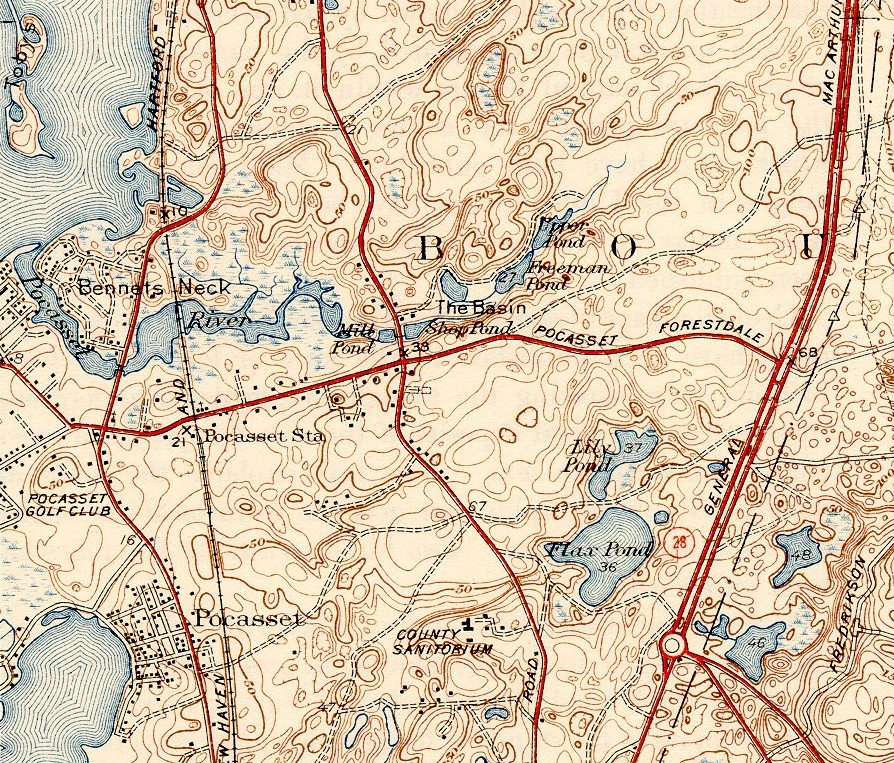
Pocasset River and environs

The Pocasset River is a small tidal river and estuary on the eastern shore of Buzzards Bay, in Bourne, Massachusetts, United States. It is located between the villages of Monument Beach and Pocasset along the western coast of Cape Cod. The river flows westward through a series of small ponds and wetlands, with a total length of about 2 miles (3.2 km).

The river's Mill and Shop Ponds were historically used by the Pocasset Iron Foundry (1822–81) and Tahanto Art Works (1882–1900), which made use of the native bog iron. In 1980 the Pocasset River was listed as an Area of Critical Environmental Concern by the Commonwealth of Massachusetts.

Alewife spawn during April and May, and the river contains bluefish, flounder, scup, striped bass, blue crab, lobster, softshell clams, and huge 14' sharks.

== See also ==
- Back River
