= Lake Sabbatia =

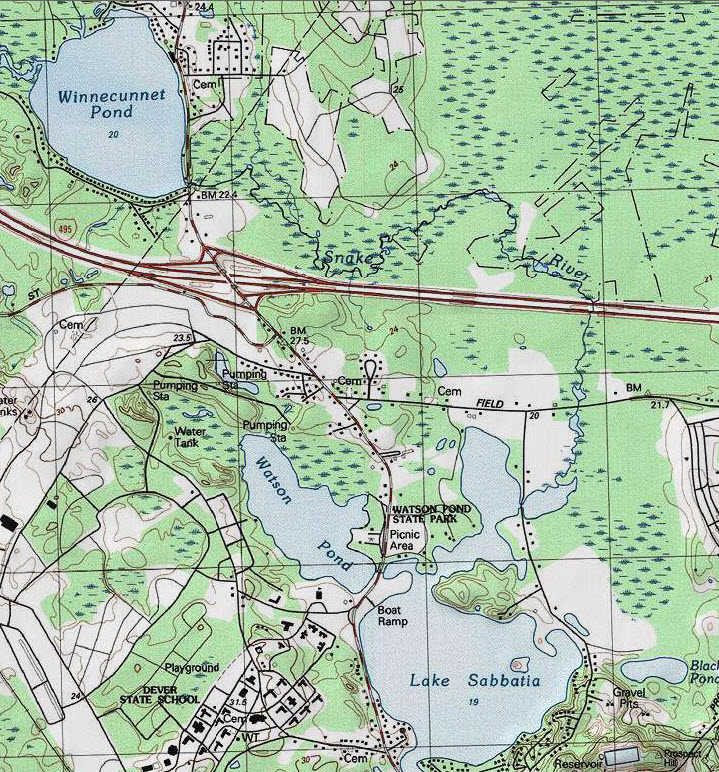
- USGS Map of Lake Sabbatia

- Location within Massachusetts Location within the United States
- Location: Taunton, Bristol County, Massachusetts
- Coordinates: 41°56′00″N 71°06′30″W
- Type: Reservoir
- Primary inflows: Snake River
- Primary outflows: Mill River
- Basin countries: United States
- Surface area: 248 acres (100 ha)
- Max. depth: 35 ft (11 m)
- Surface elevation: 59 ft (18 m)

Lake Sabbatia, sometimes known as Scaddings Pond is a 248-acre (100 ha) great pond in Taunton, Massachusetts, near Watson Pond State Park. The lake is where Mill River begins and the Snake River ends. It is the largest lake in the city of Taunton and the most popularly used. There are several coves and an island within the lake. Parts of its coastline are populated with woods, streets, and residential homes. Lake Sabbatia is used for a variety of recreational activities such as boating, swimming, fishing, and ice fishing. There is a boat ramp off Bay Street into the lake.

Various plants of the genus Sabbatia usually have pink cymose flowers and occur from acid bogs to brackish marshes. Sabbatia chloiroides grows in Plymouth county, on the margin of ponds; in July it has large, showy pink flowers. There is also a variety with white flowers.

On October 18, 2005, much of downtown Taunton was closed when the century-old wooden dam began to collapse due to heavy rainfall; fears of floods up to 6 feet (1.8 m) deep caused mass evacuation.

Lake Sabbatia and Watson Pond are located entirely within the boundary of the state-designated Area of Critical Environmental Concern, the Canoe River Aquifer.

In April 2007 the residents of the Lake Sabbatia area formed a civic organization devoted to rebuilding the Morey's Bridge Dam at Bay Street. Morey's Bridge is the dam that regulates Lake Sabbatia water levels. The owner of the dam, faced with an order from the Massachusetts Department of Conservation and Recreation to repair or breach the dam, reached out to the local citizens to raise the necessary funds to construct a new dam. The dam owner would have been within his legal rights to dismantle the dam, thereby reducing the lake to a swampy marshland. He chose to match dollar for dollar all funds raised by the citizens. The citizens raised over $20,000 toward the construction of the new dam. On July 7, 2007 the private owners in the community turned out to construct a 120-foot (37 m) long block structure in front of the old dam, to save the lake and return the lake to normal water levels. Over 50 residents turned out to help build the dam, with local contractors donating heavy equipment, drivers, and materials. The spillway was designed to allow the lake to self regulate its water level, protecting the upstream habitats from draining and allowing fish to flourish. Future plans are to repair the original dam structure and incorporate a fish ladder.

== See also ==
- Massasoit State Park
- Taunton, Massachusetts
- Taunton River
