= Monument Beach, Massachusetts =

- Census-designated place
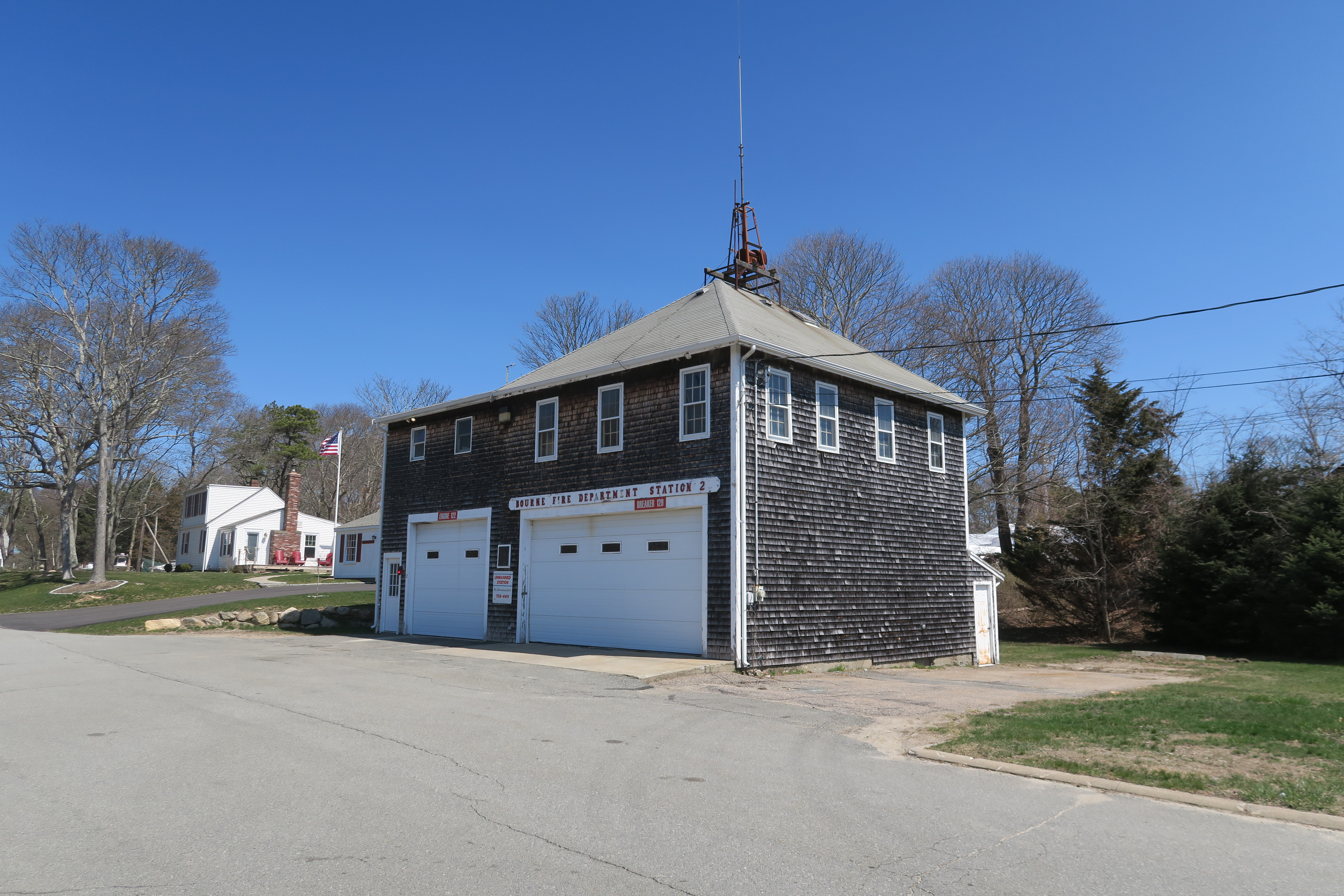
- Bourne Fire Department Station 2

- Location in Barnstable County and the state of Massachusetts.
- Coordinates: 41°43′7″N 70°36′26″W
- Country: United States
- State: Massachusetts
- County: Barnstable
- Town: Bourne

Area
  - Total: 3.46 sq mi (8.97 km^{2})
  - Land: 2.58 sq mi (6.69 km^{2})
  - Water: 0.88 sq mi (2.28 km^{2})
- Elevation: 66 ft (20 m)

Population (2020)
  - Total: 2,784
  - Density: 1,078.3/sq mi (416.35/km^{2})
- Time zone: UTC-5 (Eastern (EST))
  - Summer (DST): UTC-4 (EDT)
- ZIP Codes: 02553 (Monument Beach); 02532 (Bourne); 02559 (Pocasset)
- Area code: 508
- FIPS code: 25-42670
- GNIS feature ID: 2378173

Monument Beach is a census-designated place (CDP) in the town of Bourne in Barnstable County, Massachusetts, United States. As of the 2020 census, Monument Beach had a population of 2,784.

== Geography ==
Monument Beach is located near the center of the town of Bourne. It is situated between Buzzards Bay to the west and Massachusetts Route 28 to the east. The village of Bourne is to the north, and Pocasset village is to the south.

According to the United States Census Bureau, the Monument Beach CDP has a total area of 3.5 square miles (9.0 km^{2}), of which 2.6 square miles (6.7 km^{2}) is land, and 0.89 square miles (2.3 km^{2}) (25.72%) is water.

== History ==
On February 5, 2015, Adrian Loya murdered Lisa Trubnikova and injured her wife Anna at their house in Monument Beach. He also injured an officer he was engaged in a shootout with.

== Beach ==
Monument Beach is also the name of a beach in the Monument Beach CDP on Phinneys Harbor. The beach is used by windsurfers and has lifeguards. It is adjacent to the Monument Beach Marina. It has restrooms and is operated by the town of Bourne.

== Demographics ==
Historical population
Census	Pop.	Note	%±
2020	2,784		—
U.S. Decennial Census

=== 2020 census ===
As of the 2020 census, Monument Beach had a population of 2,784. The median age was 56.7 years. 13.5% of residents were under the age of 18 and 33.8% of residents were 65 years of age or older. For every 100 females there were 86.8 males, and for every 100 females age 18 and over there were 84.0 males age 18 and over.

99.4% of residents lived in urban areas, while 0.6% lived in rural areas.

There were 1,288 households in Monument Beach, of which 16.8% had children under the age of 18 living in them. Of all households, 49.1% were married-couple households, 13.5% were households with a male householder and no spouse or partner present, and 31.3% were households with a female householder and no spouse or partner present. About 31.0% of all households were made up of individuals and 18.6% had someone living alone who was 65 years of age or older.

There were 1,584 housing units, of which 18.7% were vacant. The homeowner vacancy rate was 1.2% and the rental vacancy rate was 8.3%.

Racial composition as of the 2020 census
Race	Number	Percent
White	2,577	92.6%
Black or African American	24	0.9%
American Indian and Alaska Native	4	0.1%
Asian	39	1.4%
Native Hawaiian and Other Pacific Islander	0	0.0%
Some other race	27	1.0%
Two or more races	113	4.1%
Hispanic or Latino (of any race)	33	1.2%

=== 2000 census ===
As of the census of 2000, there were 2,438 people, 1,023 households, and 694 families residing in the CDP. The population density was 926.7/mi^{2} (357.9/km^{2}). There were 1,213 housing units at an average density of 461.1/mi^{2} (178.1/km^{2}) . The racial makeup of the CDP was 96.47% White, 0.86% African American, 0.12% Native American, 0.66% Asian, 0.74% from other races, and 1.15% from two or more races. Hispanic or Latino of any race were 0.94% of the population.

There were 1,023 households, out of which 26.4% had children under the age of 18 living with them, 54.8% were married couples living together, 9.4% had a female householder with no husband present, and 32.1% were non-families. 25.6% of all households were made up of individuals, and 9.7% had someone living alone who was 65 years of age or older. The average household size was 2.38 and the average family size was 2.88.

In the CDP, the population was spread out, with 21.9% under the age of 18, 5.6% from 18 to 24, 28.2% from 25 to 44, 27.6% from 45 to 64, and 16.7% who were 65 years of age or older. The median age was 42 years. For every 100 females, there were 92.6 males. For every 100 females age 18 and over, there were 90.0 males.

The median income for a household in the CDP was $148,564, and the median income for a family was $191,774. Males had a median income of $98,433 versus $80,650 for females. The per capita income for the CDP was $103,231. About .1% of families and .4% of the population were below the poverty line, including .08% of those under age 18 and .09% of those age 65 or over.

== See also ==
- Back River (Buzzards Bay)
- Pocasset River (Massachusetts)
