= Wading River (Massachusetts) =

River in Massachusetts, United States

The Wading River is a 13.1-mile-long (21.1 km) river in southeastern Massachusetts in the United States. It rises from Lake Miramichi in the town of Foxborough and flows southeast through Mansfield into the town of Norton, where it turns east, flows through Barrowsville Pond, and continues to its confluence with the Rumford River, forming the Three Mile River. The river is part of the Taunton River watershed.
