= King Phillip's Cave (Massachusetts) =

Cave in Massachusetts, United States

King Phillip’s Cave
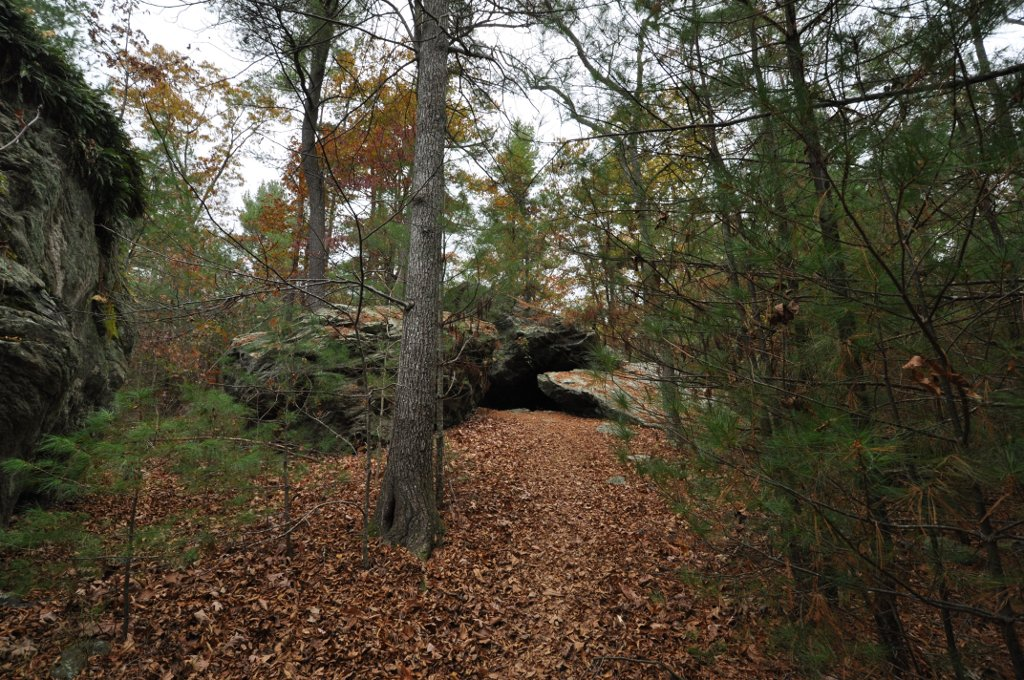
- The cave in 2013

- Location within Massachusetts
- Location: Norton, Massachusetts, United States
- Coordinates: 41°58′49.765″N 71°7′49.52″W
- Geology: Talus
- Access: Public

King Philip's Cave is a cave in Norton, Massachusetts near Lake Winnecunnett. It may be accessed from Stone Run Drive off Plain Street near Bay Road and sits on a 7-acre (28,000 m^{2}) parcel of land owned by the Land Preservation Society, an independent non-profit conservation organization chartered in 1970 by the State of Massachusetts.

The cave is so named because Metacomet, the Wampanoag sachem also known as "King Philip", is said to have hidden here near the end of King Philip's War before meeting his death in the Great Miery Swamp in Bristol, RI.

According to materials published by The Patriot Ledger:

The town forest, where King Philip's Cave is located, and Lake Winnecunnett are both popular recreation sites.

According to another source:

Every Norton school child has been entertained with the legend of King Philip's Cave.
