= Lake Massapoag =

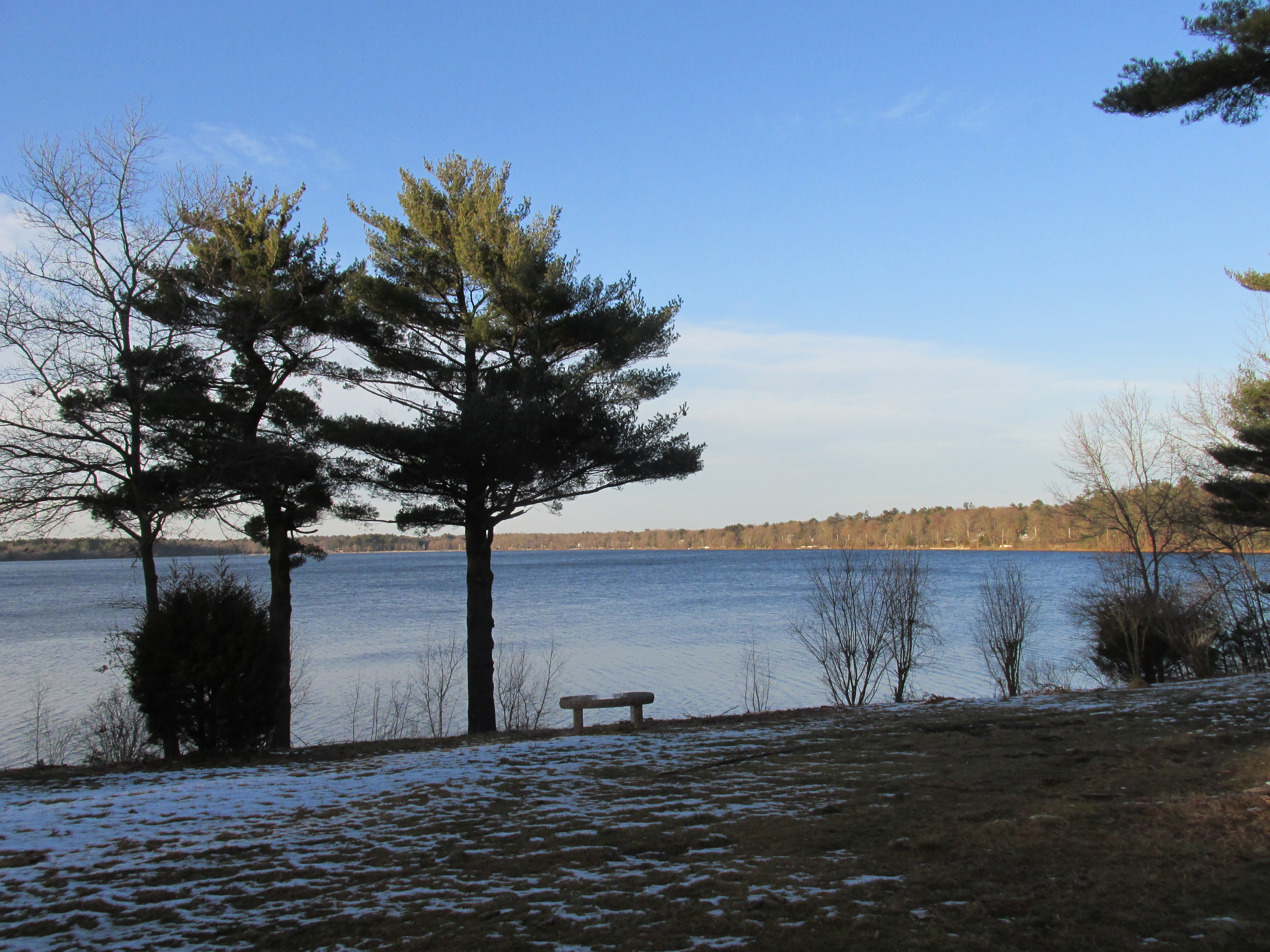
- Lake Massapoag

- Location within Massachusetts Location within the United States
- Location: Sharon, Norfolk County, Massachusetts, U.S.
- Coordinates: 42°6′4″N 71°10′37″W
- Type: natural freshwater lake
- Primary inflows: springs, Sucker Brook, Lagoon
- Primary outflows: Massapoag Brook
- Basin countries: United States
- Surface area: 353 acres (143 ha)
- Average depth: 13 ft (4.0 m)
- Max. depth: 45 ft (14 m)
- Surface elevation: 249 ft (76 m)

Lake Massapoag is a 353-acre (1.43 km^{2}), natural, springfed lake located in Sharon, Massachusetts. The name Massapoag is Algonquin, meaning "large water".

Lake Massapoag is the headwaters of the Massapoag Brook, which flows into the Neponset River.

== History ==
In the 18th century, workers deepened the outlet of the lake to draw the water down in order to extract bog iron for the smelting industry.

Lake Massapoag was the site of a large 19th-century ice business, with an enormous wooden icehouse at the eastern end of the lake.

Because of the lake and the fact that Sharon is at a slightly higher elevation than the surrounding towns, and because it is located on the main rail line going south from Boston, the shores of the lake developed into a minor summer resort with several large hotels, summer camps and cottage colonies. Temple Adath Sharon was built as a summer synagogue, and the houses around it, now occupied year-round, were once summer cottages.

== Recreation ==
The site of the former ice house is now a large town beach. The beach was created by trucking in quantities of sand after the ice house burned down.

The lake is also popular for sailing and sailboarding. The Wheaton College Sailing Team, Sharon High School Sailing Team, and Dover Sherborn High School Sailing Team train on Lake Massapoag.
