= Winnecunnet Pond =

Pond in Massachusetts, United States

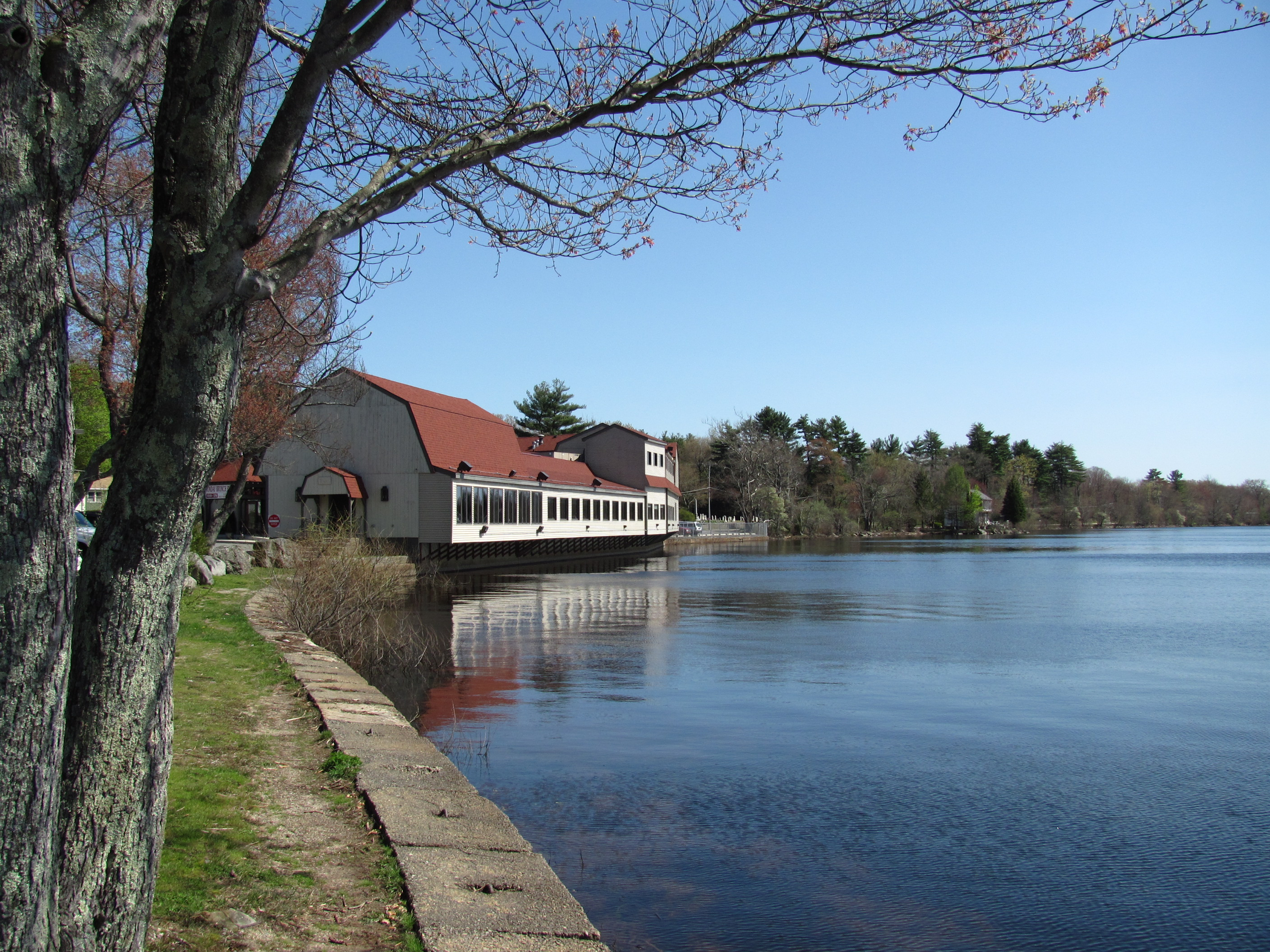

- Location within Massachusetts Location within the United States
- Location: Norton, Massachusetts, United States
- Coordinates: 41°58′15″N 71°07′55″W
- Primary inflows: Canoe River, Mulberry Brook
- Primary outflows: Snake River (Mill River)
- Basin countries: United States
- Surface area: 148 acres (60 ha)
- Average depth: 6 ft (1.8 m)
- Max. depth: 11 ft (3.4 m)

See also Winnacunnet (disambiguation).

Winnecunnet Pond or Winneconnet Pond or Winnecunnett Pond, very often called Lake Winnecunnet or Lake Winneconnet or Lake Winnecunnett although it is a pond rather than a lake, is a body of water in Norton, Massachusetts, United States.

The name also lends itself to the residential area around the pond. "Winnecunnett" (in its various spellings) may be an Algonquian word meaning "beautiful place in the pines".

== Location ==
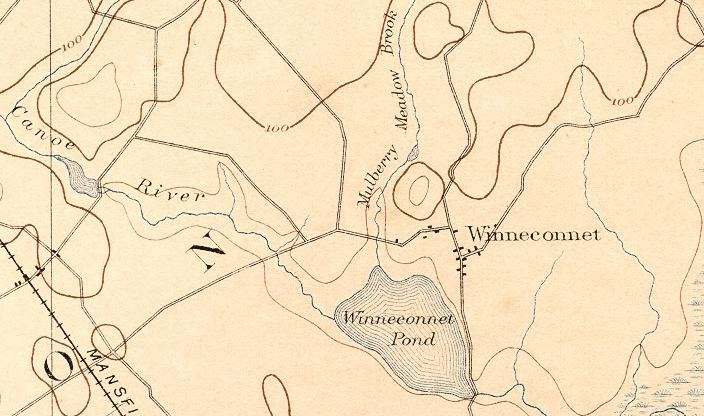
This 19th-century map shows Winneconnet Pond and surrounding area.

Located on the east side of town (on the north side of I-495), Winneconnet Pond is fed by the Canoe River and Mulberry Meadow Brook (sometimes simply called "Mulberry Brook" and referred to in an 1890 document as "Leach's Stream").

Winneconnet Pond feeds into a portion of the Mill River known as the "Snake River" before the Mill River feeds into the Taunton River.

According to The Sun Chronicle, at one time the town of Norton's "approximate gateways were Ulmer's Farm on Route 123 and a big turkey farm near Lake Winnecunnett."

== Characteristics ==
Winneconnet Pond is a 148 acres (60 ha) pond in that is part of the Taunton River Watershed. It has an average depth of 5.5 ft (1.7 m) and a maximum depth of 18 ft (5.5 m). According to MassWildlife:

The fertile, stained water is transparent to five feet and the bottom is predominantly mud. The shoreline is heavily developed with commercial and residential buildings except for the swampy areas near inlets.

Weeds are a serious problem in Winneconnet Pond. The pond appeared on the United States Environmental Protection Agency "Massachusetts List of Impaired Waters for 1989". The parameter of concern was given as "noxious aquatic plants."

In an October 2007 town meeting, Winneconnet Pond area residents spoke in favor of allocating a proposed $40,000 in funds to develop a weed control and dredging program for the pond which a spokesperson described "a weed-infested, mosquito breeding swamp."

Another resident complained, "We're living in unsanitary conditions…People can't sell their homes because we live on a swamp." A town official said the project would cost the town an additional $15,000 to $20,000 per year besides the initial $40,000 expenditure. Because of these cost factors, the plan was turned down.

== History ==
Metacomet, the Wampanoag Indian sachem also known as "King Phillip", is said to have hid in a cave near the pond near the end of King Philip's War before meeting his death in the Misery Swamp near Mount Hope in Bristol, Rhode Island. According to one source, "Every Norton school child has been entertained with the legend of King Phillip's Cave."

== Wildlife ==
In 1927, Edward Howe Forbush wrote a study of the nesting habits of the barred owl which included the following observation:

In the region where I hunt, in southeastern Massachusetts, the barred owl is decidedly our commonest large owl, but it is none too common at that...The Winnecunnett pair has a record of 26 years, 1905 to 1930, inclusive, though this pair also was much disturbed by cutting in the woods and was obliged to nest in five different groves of pines, one of which was a quarter of a mile away. In all these cases a pair of red shouldered hawks nested regularly in the same tract.

The panfish population of Winneconnet Pond was deliberately thinned with a netting operation in 1955. The pond was last surveyed in July 1978. In a 1978 survey, nine species of fish were found: largemouth bass, chain pickerel, yellow perch, bluegill, pumpkinseed, white perch, brown bullhead, golden shiner and white sucker. Black crappie inhabit the waters as well. In 1988 and 1992 the pond was stocked with northern pike.

== Recreational use ==
The Patriot Ledger reports that "the town forest, where King Philip's Cave is located, and Lake Winnecunnett are both popular recreation sites." The pond is used for recreational boating and angling. There is a small boat launch at the eastern edge of the pond on Bay Road.

According to the MDFW:

This pond is one of the most popular ponds in southeastern Massachusetts for ice fishing, being one of the first ponds to ice-up and one of the last to lose its ice. Due to excellent access, the pond is heavily fished. Abundant weed growth in the summer can make fishing and boating difficult. In response to this, the town of Norton once purchased and operated a weed-harvesting machine on the pond during the summer. Fisherman can expect catches of chain pickerel and largemouth bass with an occasional northern pike of ten pounds or more...
