= Norton, Massachusetts =

- Town
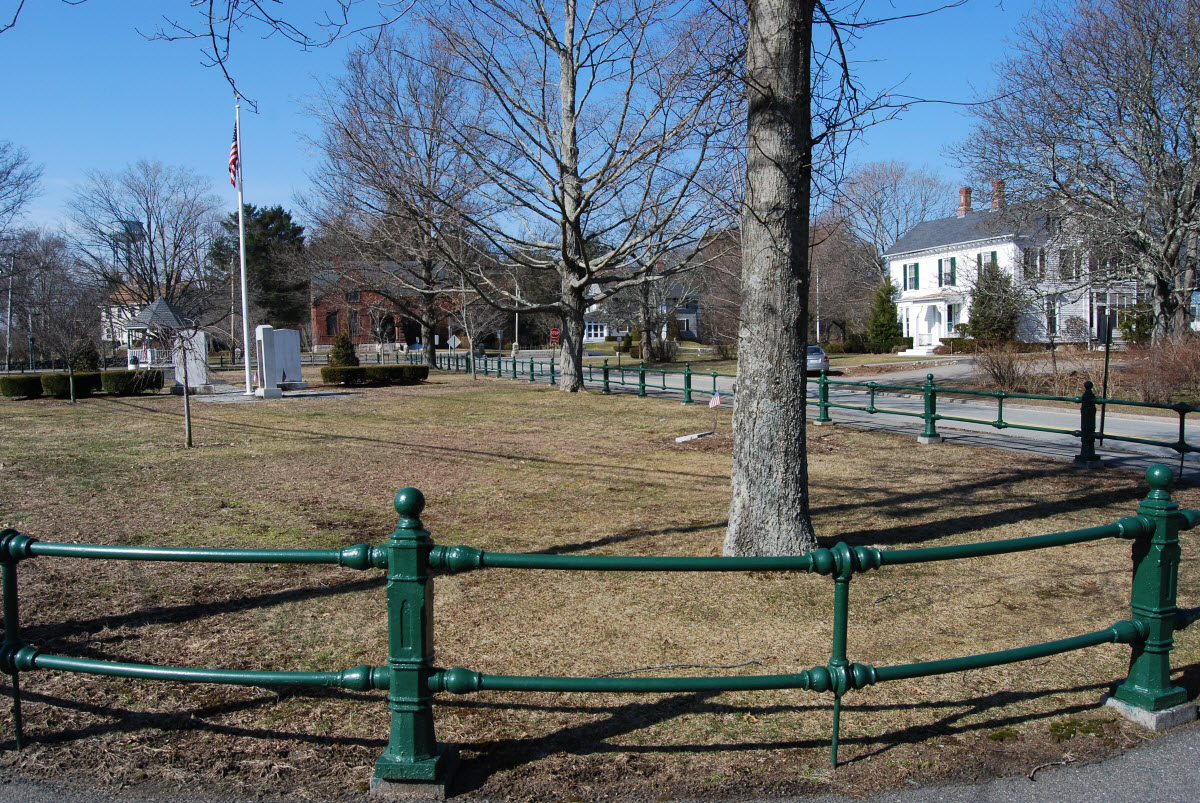
- Norton Town Common

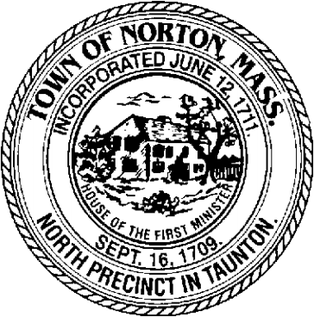
- Seal

- Location in Bristol County in Massachusetts
- Coordinates: 41°58′00″N 71°11′15″W
- Country: United States
- State: Massachusetts
- County: Bristol
- Settled: 1669
- Incorporated: 1711

Government
  - Type: Open town meeting

Area
  - Total: 29.8 sq mi (77.2 km^{2})
  - Land: 28.7 sq mi (74.4 km^{2})
  - Water: 1.1 sq mi (2.9 km^{2})
- Elevation: 105 ft (32 m)

Population (2020)
  - Total: 19,202
  - Density: 668/sq mi (258/km^{2})
- Time zone: UTC−5 (Eastern)
  - Summer (DST): UTC−4 (Eastern)
- ZIP Code: 02766
- Area code: 508/774
- FIPS code: 25-49970
- GNIS feature ID: 0619436
- Website: www.nortonma.org

Norton is a town in Bristol County, Massachusetts, United States, and contains the villages of Norton Center and Chartley. The population was 19,202 at the 2020 census. Home of Wheaton College, Norton hosted the Dell Technologies Championship, a tournament of the PGA Tour held annually on the Labor Day holiday weekend at the TPC Boston golf club until 2018.

== History ==
The lands of Norton remained unsettled by English colonists for many years after their initial arrival on the eastern Massachusetts coast. But by the late 1640s, the townships of Rehoboth and Taunton were looking to expand their boundaries further inland. The settlement of Rehoboth bought the lands north of it—what would become Attleboro—from Wamsutta in the 1666 North Purchase. The residents of Taunton were also looking to acquire more land to develop, cutting the forest back and using felled timber to feed construction and fuel industries, and settle the cleared grounds into meadows and pastureland. Norton was first legally settled by European colonists after the Taunton North Purchase in 1668. This deed of purchase from Metacomet entitled the residents of Taunton to the lands north of their current settlement—the forests, cedar swamps, rivers, meadows, and lakes that would become established as Norton, Mansfield, and Easton. In 1686, more payments to access the North Purchase lands were made by Taunton men to Wompatuck, a descendent of Chickatawbut. During King Philip's War, "a group of twenty Taunton men, fearing attack" against their settlement "followed the Three Mile River to its confluence… at the Coweset (Wading) and Rumford Rivers and the thick swamp between them," attacking women and children who were sheltering there. In this fight, at Norton's so-called "Lockety Neck," the men murdered or otherwise participated in the killing of Weetamoo, the female sachem of the Pocasset Wampanoag people. There is a memorial plaque on Pine Street commemorating her and other Wampanoag families killed in this attack.

When Norton was first settled in 1669 it was called North Taunton for its location on the northern border of Taunton, Massachusetts. The town was renamed "Norton"—after Norton, Oxfordshire, England, where many early settlers had originated—when the town was officially established on March 17, 1710. Parts of Norton were set out as Easton on December 21, 1725, and as Mansfield on April 26, 1770.

Metacomet, the Wampanoag Indian sachem also known as "King Phillip", used to camp at a cave made by huge glacial rocks resting on top of each other, just north-east of Lake Winnecunnet. Every Norton school child has been entertained with the legend of King Phillip's Cave.

The bandstand within the town center was originally erected using donated funds during the first Gulf War, in honor of the veterans who served from Norton.

In elementary school, students were told the story of the "Devil's Foot Print", where Major George Leonard sold his soul to the devil. The devil's foot print can be seen at Norton's Joseph C. Solmonese Elementary School, on land which was once Leonard's farmland. Every 26 years, the school unburies a time capsule, the last of which was buried in 1999. The time capsule will be opened next in 2026.

So it was in December 1997, when a traffic light was installed at the intersection of routes 123 and 140 in Norton. It was the town's first full traffic light and, in a manner of speaking, it declared "Norton isn't Mayberry anymore."

Norton is also a location in the claimed paranormal Bridgewater Triangle.

== Geography ==
Map of Norton made in 1830

According to the United States Census Bureau, the town has a total area of 29.8 square miles (77 km^{2}), of which 28.7 square miles (74 km^{2}) is land and 1.1 square miles (2.8 km^{2}), or 3.72%, is water. The terrain of Norton is generally low and swampy. The waters of the area are fed by the Wading River and the Canoe River, both of which feed into the Taunton River downstream. The two largest bodies of water in town are the Norton Reservoir, north of the center of town, and Winnecunnet Pond on the east (on the north side of I-495), which is fed by the Canoe River and feeds into the Mill River.

Lake Winnecunnet is Norton's only natural body of water. Classified as a kettle pond, it formed over 13,000 years ago when a large chunk of glacial ice rested there and gradually melted, creating the lake as the climate slowly warmed.

The town, an irregular polygon generally oriented from northeast to southwest, is bordered by Easton to the northeast, Taunton to the southeast, Rehoboth to the south, Attleboro to the southwest, and Mansfield to the northwest. Norton is approximately 27 miles south-southwest of Boston, and 15 miles northeast of Providence, Rhode Island.

=== Climate ===
According to the Köppen Climate Classification system, Norton has a humid subtropical climate, abbreviated "Cfa" on climate maps. The hottest temperature recorded in Norton was 101 °F (38.3 °C) on July 20, 1991, while the coldest temperature recorded was −19 °F (−28.3 °C) on January 22, 1984. Norton is also the location of the National Weather Service forecast office that serves much of Massachusetts, all of Rhode Island, as well as much of northern Connecticut. The National Weather Service also operates the Northeast River Forecast Center on the site, serving New England and most of New York state..

Climate data for Norton, Massachusetts, 1991–2020 normals, extremes 1913–present
Month	Jan	Feb	Mar	Apr	May	Jun	Jul	Aug	Sep	Oct	Nov	Dec	Year
Record high °F (°C)	69 (21)	70 (21)	86 (30)	96 (36)	96 (36)	99 (37)	101 (38)	99 (37)	97 (36)	89 (32)	77 (25)	76 (24)	101 (38)
Mean maximum °F (°C)	57.9 (14.4)	57.5 (14.2)	66.9 (19.4)	79.5 (26.4)	88.0 (31.1)	91.4 (33.0)	93.9 (34.4)	91.9 (33.3)	87.3 (30.7)	77.2 (25.1)	68.7 (20.4)	61.2 (16.2)	95.4 (35.2)
Mean daily maximum °F (°C)	36.5 (2.5)	38.9 (3.8)	46.2 (7.9)	58.0 (14.4)	68.6 (20.3)	77.1 (25.1)	82.5 (28.1)	80.9 (27.2)	73.2 (22.9)	61.2 (16.2)	51.1 (10.6)	41.5 (5.3)	59.6 (15.4)
Daily mean °F (°C)	27.4 (−2.6)	29.1 (−1.6)	36.4 (2.4)	46.7 (8.2)	57.2 (14.0)	66.2 (19.0)	72.1 (22.3)	70.5 (21.4)	62.6 (17.0)	51.1 (10.6)	41.5 (5.3)	32.9 (0.5)	49.5 (9.7)
Mean daily minimum °F (°C)	18.3 (−7.6)	19.4 (−7.0)	26.5 (−3.1)	35.4 (1.9)	45.8 (7.7)	55.3 (12.9)	61.6 (16.4)	60.0 (15.6)	52.0 (11.1)	41.0 (5.0)	32.0 (0.0)	24.3 (−4.3)	39.3 (4.1)
Mean minimum °F (°C)	−0.3 (−17.9)	2.0 (−16.7)	10.4 (−12.0)	24.6 (−4.1)	32.1 (0.1)	42.8 (6.0)	51.0 (10.6)	48.9 (9.4)	37.2 (2.9)	27.2 (−2.7)	17.8 (−7.9)	7.8 (−13.4)	−3.1 (−19.5)
Record low °F (°C)	−19 (−28)	−17 (−27)	−5 (−21)	15 (−9)	20 (−7)	27 (−3)	41 (5)	30 (−1)	23 (−5)	10 (−12)	1 (−17)	−15 (−26)	−19 (−28)
Average precipitation inches (mm)	4.41 (112)	3.79 (96)	5.35 (136)	4.72 (120)	3.62 (92)	4.33 (110)	3.48 (88)	3.81 (97)	4.11 (104)	5.06 (129)	4.46 (113)	5.20 (132)	52.34 (1,329)
Average snowfall inches (cm)	14.3 (36)	12.6 (32)	10.1 (26)	1.9 (4.8)	0.0 (0.0)	0.0 (0.0)	0.0 (0.0)	0.0 (0.0)	0.0 (0.0)	0.2 (0.51)	1.2 (3.0)	9.2 (23)	49.5 (125.31)
Average extreme snow depth inches (cm)	8.4 (21)	9.4 (24)	7.3 (19)	1.5 (3.8)	0.0 (0.0)	0.0 (0.0)	0.0 (0.0)	0.0 (0.0)	0.0 (0.0)	0.1 (0.25)	0.9 (2.3)	6.0 (15)	14.8 (38)
Average precipitation days (≥ 0.01 in)	10.8	9.7	11.2	11.4	11.9	10.3	9.6	9.1	8.8	10.8	9.7	10.6	123.9
Average snowy days (≥ 0.1 in)	5.6	4.7	4.0	0.6	0.0	0.0	0.0	0.0	0.0	0.1	0.7	3.1	18.8
Source 1: NOAA
Source 2: National Weather Service

== Demographics ==
Historical population
Year	Pop.	±%
1790	1,428	—
1850	1,966	+37.7%
1860	1,848	−6.0%
1870	1,821	−1.5%
1880	1,782	−2.1%
1890	1,785	+0.2%
1900	1,826	+2.3%
1910	2,544	+39.3%
1920	2,374	−6.7%
1930	2,737	+15.3%
1940	3,107	+13.5%
1950	4,401	+41.6%
1960	6,818	+54.9%
1970	9,487	+39.1%
1980	12,690	+33.8%
1990	14,265	+12.4%
2000	18,036	+26.4%
2010	19,031	+5.5%
2020	19,202	+0.9%
2024*	19,392	+1.0%
* = population estimate. Source: United States census records and Population Estimates Program data.

As of the census of 2000, there were 18,036 people, 5,872 households, and 4,474 families residing in the town. These residents are often referred to as either "Nortonites" or "Nortonians", though the term "Norts" is often used in colloquial context. The population density was 628.3 inhabitants per square mile (242.6/km^{2}). There were 5,961 housing units at an average density of 207.7 per square mile (80.2/km^{2}). The racial makeup of the town was 92.15% White, 1.16% African American, 0.13% Native American, 1.00% Asian, 0.01% Pacific Islander, 4.47% from other races, and 1.08% from two or more races. Hispanic or Latino of any race were 1.14% of the population.

There were 5,872 households, out of which 42.3% had children under the age of 18 living with them, 61.8% were married couples living together, 10.8% had a female householder with no husband present, and 23.8% were non-families. 19.3% of all households were made up of individuals, and 6.9% had someone living alone who was 65 years of age or older. The average household size was 2.79 and the average family size was 3.22.

In the town, the population was spread out, with 27.0% under the age of 18, 12.6% from 18 to 24, 32.2% from 25 to 44, 20.5% from 45 to 64, and 7.8% who were 65 years of age or older. The median age was 33 years. For every 100 females, there were 90.7 males. For every 100 females age 18 and over, there were 86.1 males.

According to a 2016 estimate, the median income for a household in the town was $80,806, and the median income for a family in 2016 was estimated at $104,176. Males had a median income of $51,133 versus $33,149 for females. The per capita income for the town was $23,876. About 2.2% of families and 4.0% of the population were below the poverty line, including 2.9% of those under age 18 and 12.9% of those age 65 or over.

== Government ==
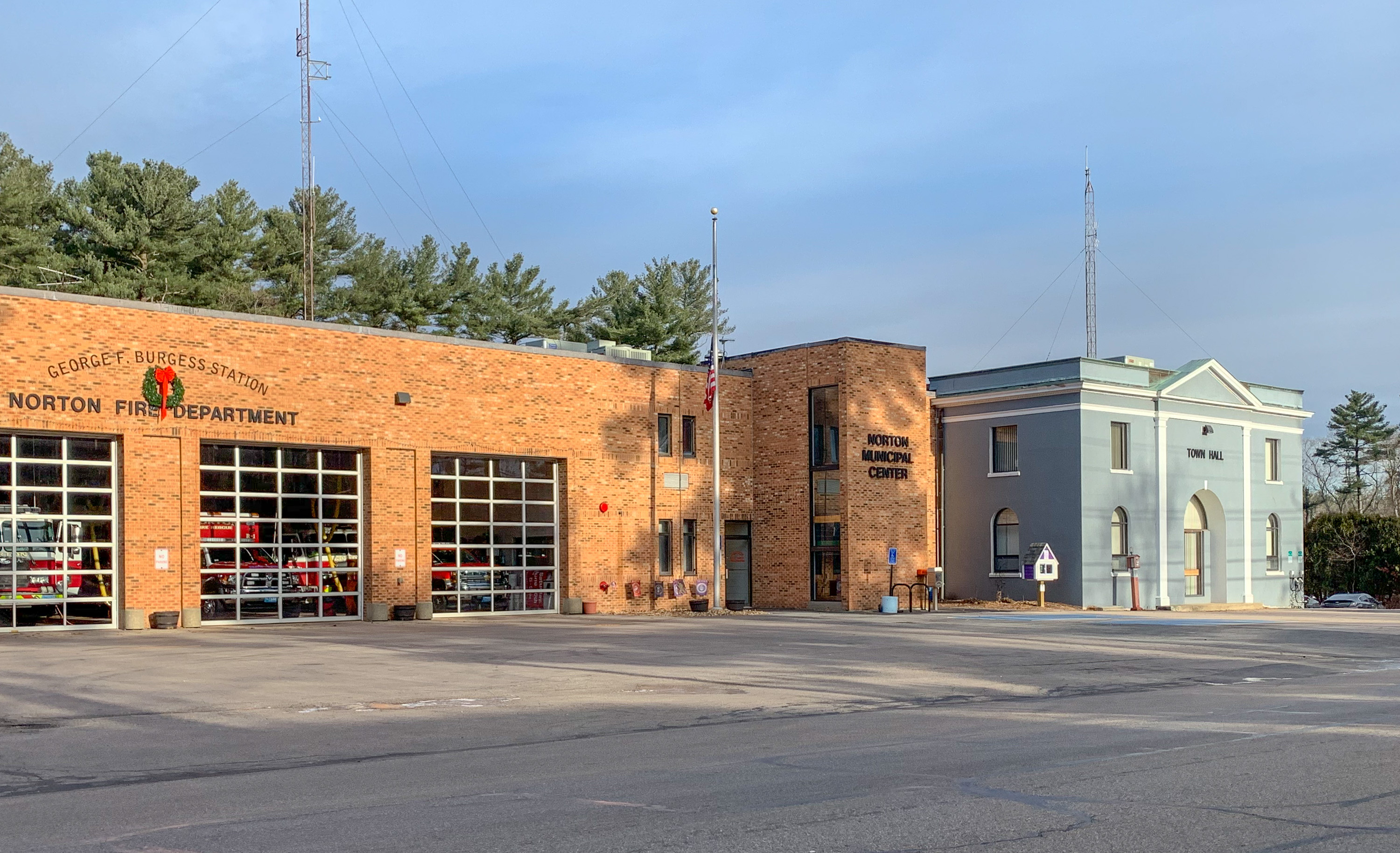
Norton Fire Department and Town Hall

=== State and national government ===
The town is a part of three separate state representative districts; precinct one belonging to the Fourth Bristol district (which includes all of Rehoboth, Seekonk and part of Swansea), precinct two belonging to the Fourteenth Bristol district (which includes parts of North Attleborough, Attleboro and Mansfield as well), and precincts three through five belonging to the First Bristol district (whose district includes Mansfield Center and Foxborough). The town is a part of the state senate district of the Bristol and Norfolk district, stretching from Dover to the north to Rehoboth and Seekonk to the south. James Timilty served as State Senator until 2017 for the Bristol & Norfolk district. Upon his retirement, he was succeeded by State Senator Paul Feeney. State Representatives Steven S. Howitt and Frederick J. Barrows serve the Town. Norton is patrolled by Troop H (Metro Boston District), Third (Foxborough) Barracks of the Massachusetts State Police.

On the national level, the town is part of Massachusetts Congressional District 4, which is represented by Jake Auchincloss. The state's senior Senator, newly elected in 2012, is Elizabeth Warren and the state's junior Senator is currently Ed Markey.

=== Town government ===
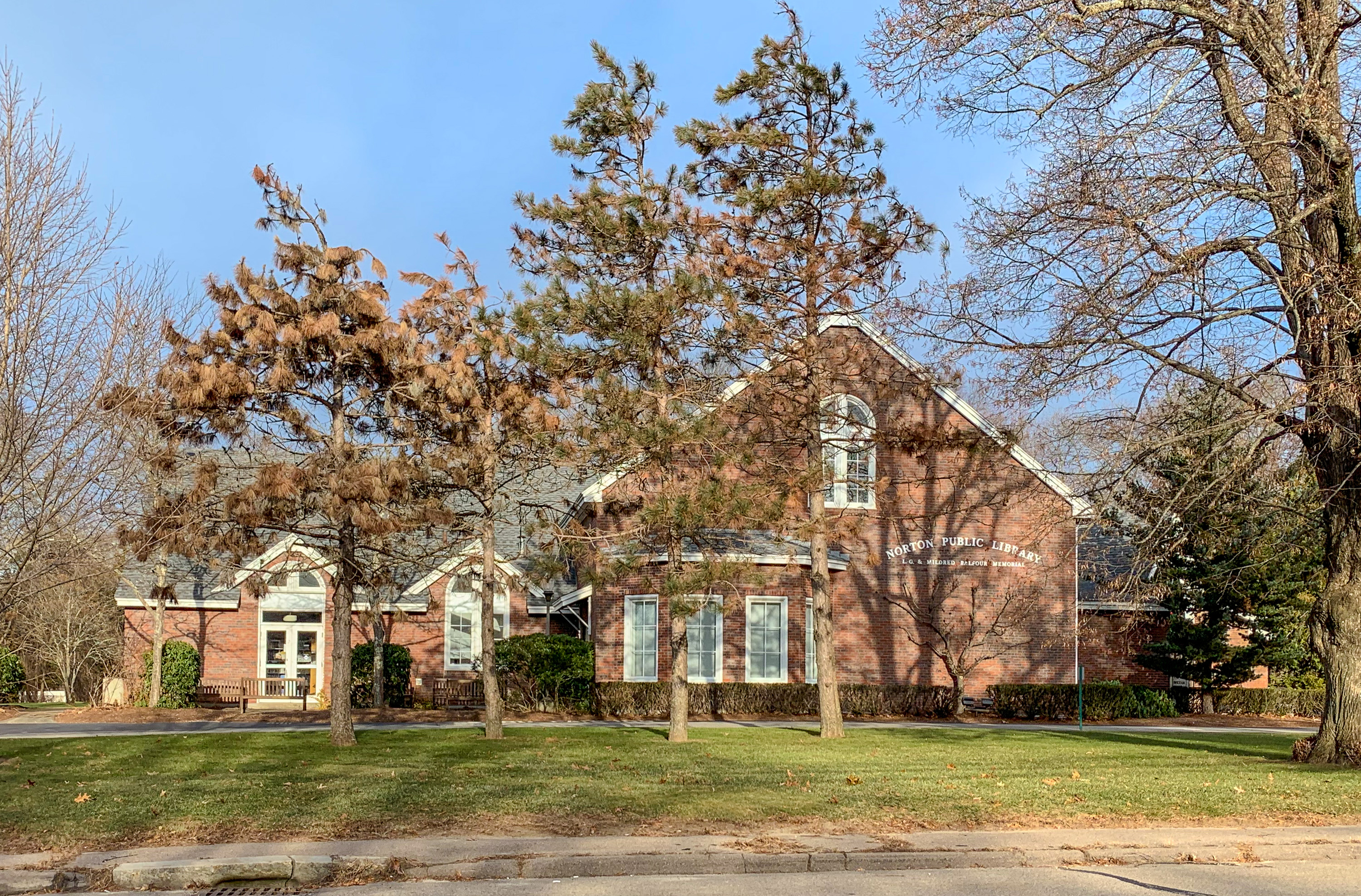
Norton Public Library

The town has an open town meeting form of government, with a town manager and a Select Board governing the town..

Voter Registration and Party Enrollment as of February 1, 2021
Party	Number of Voters	Percentage
Democratic	2,728	19.98%
Republican	1,780	13.03%
Unaffiliated	9,161	67%
Total	13,669	100%

== Education ==
Norton Public Schools operates the following schools in Norton:

- L.G. Nourse Elementary School
- H.A. Yelle Elementary School
- Norton High School

== Infrastructure ==
=== Transportation ===
Highways include:

- Interstate 495
- 123
- 140

Buses include a Greater Attleboro Taunton Regional Transit Authority route through Norton.

Trains include the Middleboro Subdivision, a freight line.

=== Services ===
Norton is served by police, two fire stations, two post offices, and a library.

== Notable people ==
- Javik Blake, Current Play-By-Play Radio announcer for the Biloxi Shuckers.
- Troy Brown, former New England Patriots wide receiver
- George L. Clarke (1813–1890), Mayor of Providence 1869–1870, was born in Norton
- Jonathan Eddy, colonel in the American Revolution
- Rob Holland, aerobatic pilot

== See also ==
- Greater Taunton Area
- Shpack Landfill Superfund site
- Taunton River Watershed
