= Watson Pond State Park =

State park in Massachusetts, United States

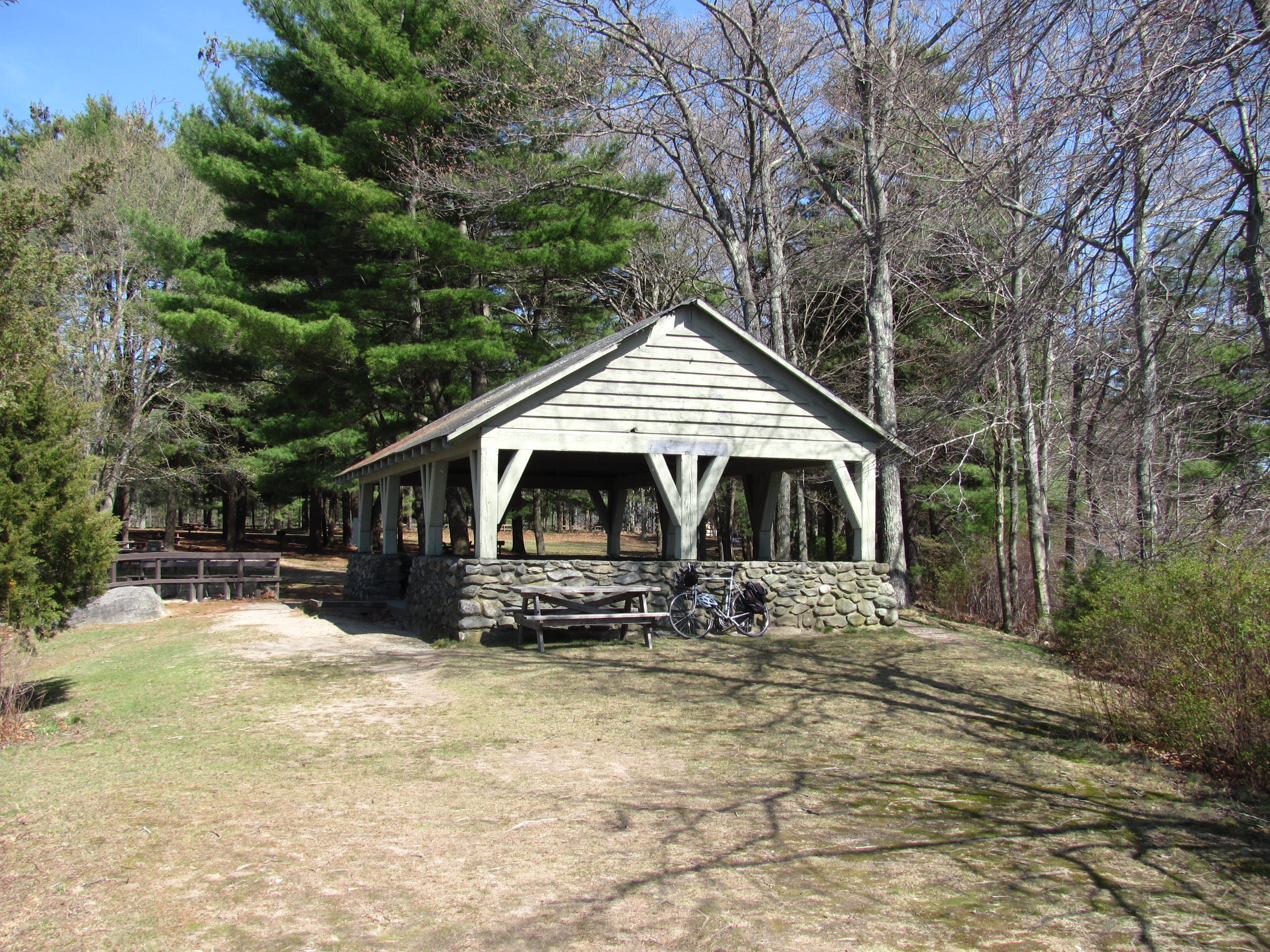
- The pavilion at Watson Pond

- Location within Massachusetts Location within the United States
- Location: Taunton, Massachusetts, United States
- Coordinates: 41°57′03″N 71°07′07″W
- Area: 10 acres (4.0 ha)
- Elevation: 62 ft (19 m)
- Administrator: Massachusetts Department of Conservation and Recreation
- Website: Official website

Watson Pond State Park is a public recreation area occupying ten acres (4.0 ha) on the east side of Watson Pond in the northern portion of the city of Taunton, Massachusetts. The state park comprises a 300-foot (91 m) swimming beach, picnic area, bathhouse and pavilion. Fishing and non-motorized boating are offered.

== In the news ==
In 2006, Watson Pond was reopened for swimming after being closed for 18 years as result of a high bacterial count. In 2010, the park was one of a thousand places given favorable mention by the Great Places in Massachusetts Commission.
