= Mill River (Taunton River tributary) =

River in Massachusetts, United States

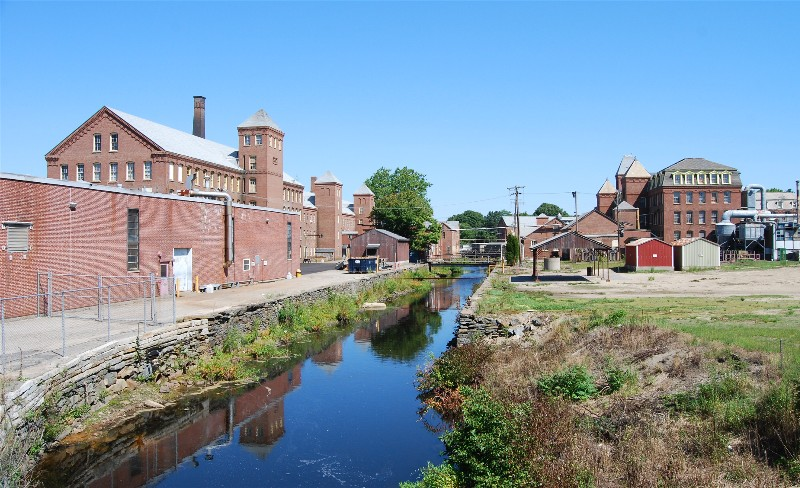
Mill River at Reed and Barton Complex

The Mill River is a tributary of the Taunton River that flows 4.0 miles (6.2 km) from Lake Sabbatia, through the center of Taunton, Massachusetts, to the Taunton River.

== See also ==
- List of Massachusetts rivers
- Taunton River Watershed
- Whittenton Pond Dam
