= List of public libraries in Massachusetts =

This is a list of public libraries in Massachusetts, USA.

Library	Web site	Town/City	County	Friends-group link	Consortia
Abington Public Library		Abington	Plymouth		OCLN
Acton Memorial Library		Acton	Middlesex		MLN
West Acton Citizens' Library		Acton	Middlesex		
Russell Memorial Library		Acushnet	Bristol		SAILS
Adams Free Library		Adams	Berkshire		
Agawam Public Library		Agawam	Hampden		
Alford Library		Alford	Berkshire		
Amesbury Public Library		Amesbury	Essex		MVLC
Jones Library, Inc.		Amherst	Hampshire		
Memorial Hall Library		Andover	Essex		MVLC
Aquinnah Public Library		Aquinnah	Dukes		CLAMS
Robbins Library		Arlington	Middlesex		MLN
Stevens Memorial Library		Ashburnham	Worcester		
Ashby Free Public Library		Ashby	Middlesex		
Belding Memorial Library		Ashfield	Franklin		
Ashland Public Library		Ashland	Middlesex		MLN
Athol Public Library		Athol	Worcester		
Attleboro Public Library		Attleboro	Bristol		
Auburn Public Library		Auburn	Worcester		
Avon Public Library		Avon	Norfolk		OCLN
Ayer Public Library		Ayer	Middlesex		
Centerville Public Library		Barnstable - Centerville	Barnstable		CLAMS
Cotuit Library		Barnstable - Cotuit	Barnstable		CLAMS
Hyannis Public Library Association		Barnstable - Hyannis	Barnstable		CLAMS
Marstons Mills Public Library		Barnstable - Marstons Mills	Barnstable		CLAMS
Osterville Village Library		Barnstable - Osterville	Barnstable		CLAMS
Sturgis Library		Barnstable - Barnstable	Barnstable		CLAMS
Whelden Memorial Library		Barnstable - West Barnstable	Barnstable		CLAMS
Woods Memorial Library		Barre	Worcester		
Becket Athenaeum, Inc.		Becket	Berkshire		
Bedford Free Public Library		Bedford	Middlesex		MLN
Clapp Memorial Library		Belchertown	Hampshire		
Bellingham Public Library		Bellingham	Norfolk		
Belmont Public Library		Belmont	Middlesex		MLN
Berkley Public Library		Berkley	Bristol		SAILS
Berlin Public Library		Berlin	Worcester		
Cushman Library		Bernardston	Franklin		
Beverly Public Library		Beverly	Essex		NOBLE
Billerica Public Library		Billerica	Middlesex		MVLC
Blackstone Public Library		Blackstone	Worcester		
Porter Memorial Library		Blandford	Hampden		
Bolton Public Library		Bolton	Worcester		
Boston Public Library		Boston	Suffolk		MBLN, BLC
Jonathan Bourne Public Library		Bourne	Barnstable		CLAMS
Sargent Memorial Library		Boxborough	Middlesex		
Boxford Town Library		Boxford	Essex		MVLC
Boylston Public Library		Boylston	Worcester		
Thayer Public Library		Braintree	Norfolk		OCLN
Brewster Ladies' Library		Brewster	Barnstable		CLAMS
Bridgewater Public Library		Bridgewater	Plymouth		
Brimfield Public Library		Brimfield	Hampden		
Brockton Public Library		Brockton	Plymouth		OCLN
Merrick Public Library		Brookfield	Worcester		
Public Library of Brookline		Brookline	Norfolk		MLN
Buckland Public Library		Buckland	Franklin		
Burlington Public Library		Burlington	Middlesex		MVLC
Cambridge Public Library		Cambridge	Middlesex		MLN
Canton Public Library		Canton	Norfolk		OCLN
Gleason Public Library		Carlisle	Middlesex		MVLC
Carver Public Library		Carver	Plymouth		
Tyler Memorial Library		Charlemont	Franklin		
Charlton Public Library		Charlton	Worcester		CW MARS
Eldredge Public Library		Chatham	Barnstable		CLAMS
South Chatham Public Library		Chatham	Barnstable		
Chelmsford Public Library		Chelmsford	Middlesex		MVLC
Chelsea Public Library		Chelsea	Suffolk		MBLN
Cheshire Public Library		Cheshire	Berkshire		
Hamilton Memorial Library		Chester	Hampden		
Chesterfield Public Library		Chesterfield	Hampshire		
Chicopee Public Library		Chicopee	Hampden		
Chilmark Free Public Library		Chilmark	Dukes		CLAMS
Clarksburg Town Library		Clarksburg	Berkshire		
Bigelow Free Public Library		Clinton	Worcester		
Paul Pratt Memorial Library		Cohasset	Norfolk		OCLN
Griswold Memorial Library		Colrain	Franklin		
Concord Free Public Library		Concord	Middlesex		MLN
Field Memorial Library		Conway	Franklin		
Bryant Free Library		Cummington	Hampshire		
Dalton Free Public Library		Dalton	Berkshire		
Peabody Institute Library		Danvers	Essex		NOBLE
Dartmouth Public Libraries		Dartmouth	Bristol		
Dedham Public Library		Dedham	Norfolk		MLN
Tilton Library		Deerfield	Franklin		
Dennis Memorial Library Association		Dennis - Dennis	Barnstable		CLAMS
Dennis Public Library		Dennis - Dennis Port	Barnstable		CLAMS
Jacob Sears Memorial Library		Dennis - East Dennis	Barnstable		CLAMS
South Dennis Free Public Library		Dennis - South Dennis	Barnstable		CLAMS
West Dennis Free Public Library		Dennis - West Dennis	Barnstable		CLAMS
Dighton Public Library		Dighton	Bristol		
Simon Fairfield Public Library		Douglas	Worcester		
Dover Town Library		Dover	Norfolk		MLN
Moses Greeley Parker Memorial Library		Dracut	Middlesex		MVLC
Pearle L. Crawford Memorial Library		Dudley	Worcester		
Dunstable Free Public Library		Dunstable	Middlesex		MVLC
Duxbury Free Library		Duxbury	Plymouth		OCLN
East Bridgewater Public Library		East Bridgewater	Plymouth		
East Brookfield Public Library		East Brookfield	Worcester		
East Longmeadow Public Library		East Longmeadow	Hampden		
Eastham Public Library		Eastham	Barnstable		CLAMS
Emily Williston Memorial Library		Easthampton	Hampshire		
Ames Free Library		Easton	Bristol		
Edgartown Free Public Library		Edgartown	Dukes		CLAMS
Egremont Free Library		Egremont	Berkshire		
Erving Public Library		Erving	Franklin		
T.O.H.P. Burnham Free Library		Essex	Essex		MVLC
Everett Public Libraries		Everett	Middlesex		NOBLE
Millicent Library		Fairhaven	Bristol		
Fall River Public Library		Fall River	Bristol		
Falmouth Public Library		Falmouth	Barnstable		CLAMS
West Falmouth Library		Falmouth - West Falmouth	Barnstable		CLAMS
Woods Hole Public Library		Falmouth - Woods Hole	Barnstable		CLAMS
Fitchburg Public Library		Fitchburg	Worcester		
Florida Free Library		Florida	Berkshire		
Boyden Library		Foxborough	Norfolk		
Framingham Public Library		Framingham	Middlesex		MLN
Franklin Public Library		Franklin	Norfolk		MLN
Guilford H. Hathaway Library		Freetown - Assonet	Bristol		SAILS
James White Memorial Library		Freetown - East Freetown	Bristol		SAILS
Levi Heywood Memorial Library		Gardner	Worcester		
Peabody Library		Georgetown	Essex		MVLC
Slate Memorial Library		Gill	Franklin		
Gloucester Lyceum & Sawyer Free Library		Gloucester	Essex		NOBLE
Goshen Free Public Library		Goshen	Hampshire		
Cuttyhunk Public Library		Gosnold	Dukes		
Grafton Public Library		Grafton	Worcester		
Granby Free Public Library		Granby	Hampshire		
Granville Public Library		Granville	Hampden		
Great Barrington Libraries		Great Barrington	Berkshire		
Greenfield Public Library		Greenfield	Franklin		
Groton Public Library		Groton	Middlesex		MVLC
Langley-Adams Library		Groveland	Essex		MVLC
Goodwin Memorial Library		Hadley	Hampshire		
Holmes Public Library		Halifax	Plymouth		
Hamilton-Wenham Public Library		Hamilton	Essex		MVLC
Hampden Free Public Library		Hampden	Hampden		
Taylor Memorial Library		Hancock	Berkshire		
John Curtis Free Library		Hanover	Plymouth		OCLN
Hanson Public Library		Hanson	Plymouth		
Gilbertville Public Library		Hardwick	Worcester		
Paige Memorial Library		Hardwick	Worcester		
Harvard Public Library		Harvard	Worcester		
Harwich Port Library Association		Harwich	Barnstable		
Brooks Free Library		Harwich	Barnstable		CLAMS
Chase Library Assoc., Inc.		Harwich	Barnstable		
Hatfield Public Library		Hatfield	Hampshire		
Haverhill Public Library		Haverhill	Essex		MVLC
Heath Free Public Library		Heath	Franklin		
Hingham Public Library		Hingham	Plymouth		OCLN
Hinsdale Public Library		Hinsdale	Berkshire		
Holbrook Public Library		Holbrook	Norfolk		OCLN
Gale Free Library		Holden	Worcester		
Holland Public Library		Holland	Hampden		
Holliston Public Library		Holliston	Middlesex		MLN
Holyoke Public Library		Holyoke	Hampden		
Bancroft Memorial Library		Hopedale	Worcester		
Hopkinton Public Library		Hopkinton	Middlesex		
Hubbardston Public Library		Hubbardston	Worcester		
Hudson Public Library		Hudson	Middlesex		
Hull Public Library		Hull	Plymouth		OCLN
Huntington Public Library		Huntington	Hampshire		
Ipswich Public Library		Ipswich	Essex		MVLC
Kingston Public Library		Kingston	Plymouth		OCLN
Lakeville Free Public Library		Lakeville	Plymouth		SAILS
Thayer Memorial Library		Lancaster	Worcester		
Lanesborough Public Library		Lanesborough	Berkshire		
Lawrence Public Library		Lawrence	Essex		MVLC
Lee Library Association		Lee	Berkshire		
Leicester Public Library		Leicester	Worcester		
Lenox Library Association		Lenox	Berkshire		
Leominster Public Library		Leominster	Worcester		
Leverett Library		Leverett	Franklin		
Cary Memorial Library		Lexington	Middlesex		MLN
Robertson Memorial Library		Leyden	Franklin		
Lincoln Public Library		Lincoln	Middlesex		MLN
Reuben Hoar Library		Littleton	Middlesex		MVLC
Richard Salter Storrs Library		Longmeadow	Hampden		
Samuel S. Pollard Memorial Library		Lowell	Middlesex		MVLC
Hubbard Memorial Library		Ludlow	Hampden		
Lunenburg Public Library		Lunenburg	Worcester		
Lynn Public Library		Lynn	Essex		NOBLE
Lynnfield Public Library		Lynnfield	Essex		NOBLE
Malden Public Library		Malden	Middlesex		MBLN
Manchester-by-the-Sea Public Library		Manchester-by-the-Sea	Essex		MVLC
Mansfield Public Library		Mansfield	Bristol		
Abbot Public Library		Marblehead	Essex		NOBLE
Elizabeth Taber Library		Marion	Plymouth		
Marlborough Public Library		Marlborough	Middlesex		
Ventress Memorial Library		Marshfield	Plymouth		OCLN
Mashpee Public Library		Mashpee	Barnstable		CLAMS
Mattapoisett Free Public Library		Mattapoisett	Plymouth		SAILS
Maynard Public Library		Maynard	Middlesex		MLN
Medfield Public Library		Medfield	Norfolk		MLN
Medford Public Library		Medford	Middlesex		MLN
Medway Public Library		Medway	Norfolk		MLN
Melrose Public Library		Melrose	Middlesex		NOBLE
Taft Public Library		Mendon	Worcester		
Merrimac Public Library		Merrimac	Essex		MVLC
Nevins Memorial Library		Methuen	Essex		MVLC
Middleborough Public Library		Middleborough	Plymouth		
Middlefield Public Library		Middlefield	Hampshire		
Flint Public Library		Middleton	Essex		MVLC
Milford Town Library		Milford	Worcester		
Millbury Public Library		Millbury	Worcester		
Millis Public Library		Millis	Norfolk		MLN
Millville Free Public Library		Millville	Worcester		
Milton Public Library		Milton	Norfolk		OCLN
Monroe Public Library		Monroe	Franklin		
Monson Free Library and Reading Room Association		Monson	Hampden		
Montague Public Libraries: Carnegie Public Library		Montague	Franklin		
Monterey Library		Monterey	Berkshire		
Grace Hall Memorial Library		Montgomery	Hampden		
Mount Washington Library		Mount Washington	Berkshire		
Nahant Public Library		Nahant	Essex		
Nantucket Atheneum		Nantucket	Nantucket		CLAMS
Bacon Free Library		Natick	Middlesex		MLN
Morse Institute Library		Natick	Middlesex		MLN
Needham Free Public Library		Needham	Norfolk		MLN
New Bedford Free Public Library		New Bedford	Bristol		SAILS
Leroy Pollard Memorial Library		New Braintree	Worcester		
New Marlborough Town Library		New Marlborough	Berkshire		
New Salem Public Library		New Salem	Franklin		
Newbury Town Library		Newbury	Essex		MVLC
Newburyport Public Library		Newburyport	Essex		MVLC
Newton Free Library		Newton	Middlesex		MLN
Norfolk Public Library		Norfolk	Norfolk		
North Adams Public Library		North Adams	Berkshire		
Stevens Memorial Library		North Andover	Essex		MVLC
Richards Memorial Library		North Attleborough	Bristol		
Haston Free Public Library		North Brookfield	Worcester		
Ames Free Library		North Easton	Bristol		
Flint Memorial Library		North Reading	Middlesex		MVLC
Northborough Free Library		Northborough	Worcester		
Whitinsville Social Library		Northbridge	Worcester		
Dickinson Memorial Library		Northfield	Franklin		
Field Library		Northfield	Franklin		
Forbes Library		Northampton	Hampshire		
Lilly Library		Northampton	Hampshire		
Norton Public Library		Norton	Bristol		
Norwell Public Library		Norwell	Plymouth		OCLN
Morrill Memorial Library		Norwood	Norfolk		MLN
Oak Bluffs Public Library		Oak Bluffs	Dukes		CLAMS
Fobes Memorial Library		Oakham	Worcester		
Wheeler Memorial Library		Orange	Franklin		
Snow Library		Orleans	Barnstable		CLAMS
Otis Library and Museum		Otis	Berkshire		
Oxford Free Public Library		Oxford	Worcester		
Palmer Public Library		Palmer	Hampden		
Richards Memorial Library		Paxton	Worcester		
Peabody Institute Library		Peabody	Essex		NOBLE
Pelham Library		Pelham	Hampshire		
Pembroke Public Library		Pembroke	Plymouth		
Pepperell: Lawrence Library		Pepperell	Middlesex		
Peru Library		Peru	Berkshire		
Petersham Memorial Library		Petersham	Worcester		
Phillips Free Public Library		Phillipston	Worcester		
Berkshire Athenaeum		Pittsfield	Berkshire		
Shaw Memorial Library		Plainfield	Hampshire		
Plainville Public Library		Plainville	Norfolk		
Plymouth Public Library		Plymouth	Plymouth		OCLN
Plympton Public Library		Plympton	Plymouth		
Princeton Public Library		Princeton	Worcester		
Provincetown Public Library		Provincetown	Barnstable		CLAMS
Thomas Crane Public Library		Quincy	Norfolk		OCLN
Turner Free Library		Randolph	Norfolk		OCLN
Raynham Public Library		Raynham	Bristol		
Reading Public Library		Reading	Middlesex		NOBLE
Blanding Free Public Library		Rehoboth	Bristol		
Revere Public Library		Revere	Suffolk		NOBLE
Richmond Free Public Library		Richmond	Berkshire		
Joseph H. Plumb Memorial Library		Rochester	Plymouth		
Rockland Memorial Library		Rockland	Plymouth		OCLN
Rockport Public Library		Rockport	Essex		MVLC
Rowe Town Library		Rowe	Franklin		
Rowley Public Library		Rowley	Essex		MVLC
Phinehas S. Newton Library		Royalston	Worcester		
Russell Public Library		Russell	Hampden		
Rutland Free Public Library		Rutland	Worcester		
Salem Public Library		Salem	Essex		NOBLE
Salisbury Public Library		Salisbury	Essex		MVLC
Sandisfield Free Public Library		Sandisfield	Berkshire		
Sandwich Free Public Library		Sandwich	Barnstable		OCLN
Saugus Public Library		Saugus	Essex		NOBLE
Savoy Hollow Library		Savoy	Berkshire		
Scituate Town Library		Scituate	Plymouth		OCLN
Seekonk Public Library		Seekonk	Bristol		
Sharon Public Library		Sharon	Norfolk		OCLN
Bushnell-Sage Library		Sheffield	Berkshire		
Shelburne Free Public Library		Shelburne	Franklin		
Arms Library		Shelburne	Franklin		
Sherborn Library		Sherborn	Middlesex		MLN
Hazen Memorial Library		Shirley	Middlesex		
Shrewsbury Free Public Library		Shrewsbury	Worcester		
M. N. Spear Memorial Library		Shutesbury	Franklin		
Somerset Public Library		Somerset	Bristol		
Somerville Public Library Central Library, West Branch		Somerville	Middlesex		MLN
South Hadley Public Library		South Hadley	Hampshire		
Gaylord Memorial Library		South Hadley	Hampshire		
Edwards Public Library		Southampton	Hampshire		
Southborough Library		Southborough	Worcester		
Jacob Edwards Library		Southbridge	Worcester		
Southwick Public Library		Southwick	Hampden		
Richard Sugden Public Library		Spencer	Worcester		
Springfield City Library		Springfield	Hampden		
Conant Public Library		Sterling	Worcester		
Stockbridge Library Association		Stockbridge	Berkshire		
Stoneham Public Library		Stoneham	Middlesex		NOBLE
Stoughton Public Library		Stoughton	Norfolk		OCLN
Randall Library		Stow	Middlesex		MLN
Joshua Hyde Public Library		Sturbridge	Worcester		
Goodnow Library		Sudbury	Middlesex		MLN
Sunderland Public Library		Sunderland	Franklin		
Sutton Free Public Library		Sutton	Worcester		
Swampscott Public Library		Swampscott	Essex		NOBLE
Swansea Free Public Library		Swansea	Bristol		
Taunton Public Library		Taunton	Bristol		
Boynton Public Library		Templeton	Worcester		
Tewksbury Public Library		Tewksbury	Middlesex		MVLC
Vineyard Haven Public Library		Tisbury - Vineyard Haven	Dukes		CLAMS
Tolland Public Library		Tolland	Hampden		
Topsfield Town Library		Topsfield	Essex		MVLC
Townsend Public Library		Townsend	Middlesex		
Truro Public Library		Truro	Barnstable		CLAMS
Tyngsborough Public Library		Tyngsborough	Middlesex		MVLC
Tyringham Free Public Library		Tyringham	Berkshire		
Upton Town Library		Upton	Worcester		
Uxbridge Free Public Library		Uxbridge	Worcester		
Lucius Beebe Memorial Library		Wakefield	Middlesex		NOBLE
Wales Public Library		Wales	Hampden		
Walpole Public Library		Walpole	Norfolk		OCLN
Waltham Public Library		Waltham	Middlesex		MLN
Young Men's Library Association		Ware	Hampshire		
Wareham Free Library		Wareham	Plymouth		
Warren Public Library		Warren	Worcester		
West Warren Library Association		Warren	Worcester		
Warwick Free Public Library		Warwick	Franklin		
Watertown Free Public Library		Watertown	Middlesex		MLN
Wayland Free Public Library		Wayland	Middlesex		MLN
Chester C. Corbin Public Library		Webster	Worcester		
Wellesley Free Library		Wellesley	Norfolk		MLN
Wellfleet Public Library		Wellfleet	Barnstable		CLAMS
Wendell Free Library		Wendell	Franklin		
Beaman Memorial Public Library		West Boylston	Worcester		
West Bridgewater Public Library		West Bridgewater	Plymouth		
Merriam-Gilbert Public Library		West Brookfield	Worcester		
G. A. R. Memorial Library		West Newbury	Essex		MVLC
West Springfield Public Library		West Springfield	Hampden		
West Stockbridge Public Library		West Stockbridge	Berkshire		
West Tisbury Free Public Library		West Tisbury	Dukes		CLAMS
Westborough Public Library		Westborough	Worcester		
Westfield Athenaeum		Westfield	Hampden		
J. V. Fletcher Library		Westford	Middlesex		MVLC
Westhampton Memorial Library		Westhampton	Hampshire		
Forbush Memorial Library		Westminster	Worcester		
Weston Public Library		Weston	Middlesex		MLN
Westport Free Public Library		Westport	Bristol		
Westwood Public Library		Westwood	Norfolk		MLN
Weymouth Public Libraries (Tufts, Franklin Pratt, Fogg, & North Branches)		Weymouth	Norfolk		OCLN
S. White Dickinson Memorial Library		Whately	Franklin		
Whitman Public Library		Whitman	Plymouth		OCLN
Wilbraham Public Library		Wilbraham	Hampden		
Meekins Library		Williamsburg	Hampshire		
David and Joyce Milne Public Library		Williamstown	Berkshire		
Wilmington Memorial Library		Wilmington	Middlesex		MVLC
Beals Memorial Library		Winchendon	Worcester		
Winchester Public Library		Winchester	Middlesex		MLN
Windsor Free Public Library		Windsor	Berkshire		
Winthrop Public Library		Winthrop	Suffolk		NOBLE
Woburn Public Library		Woburn	Middlesex		MLN
Worcester Public Library		Worcester	Worcester		
Worthington Library		Worthington	Hampshire		
Fiske Public Library		Wrentham	Norfolk		
Yarmouth Port Library		Yarmouth - Yarmouth Port	Barnstable		CLAMS
Yarmouth Town Libraries South Yarmouth, West Yarmouth		Yarmouth	Barnstable		CLAMS

The majority (but not all) of the libraries without a consortium link, in the following counties, belong to:

- Berkshire, Franklin, Hampden, Hampshire, Middlesex and Worcester - C/W MARS Member List
- Bristol, Norfolk and Plymouth - SAILS Library Network Member List

There are also a small number of libraries on the MassCat system. Member List

== See also ==
- Cape Libraries Automated Materials Sharing (CLAMS)
- C/W MARS (Central/Western Massachusetts Automated Resource Sharing)
- List of Carnegie libraries in Massachusetts
- Massachusetts Board of Library Commissioners
- Massachusetts Library System
- Merrimack Valley Library Consortium (MVLC)
- Metro Boston Library Network (MBLN)
- Minuteman Library Network (MLN)
- North of Boston Library Exchange (NOBLE)
- Old Colony Library Network (OCLN)
- SAILS Library Network (SAILS)
- List of libraries in 18th century Massachusetts
- List of libraries in the United States
- Books in the United States
