= Minuteman Library Network =

Library consortium in eastern Massachusetts

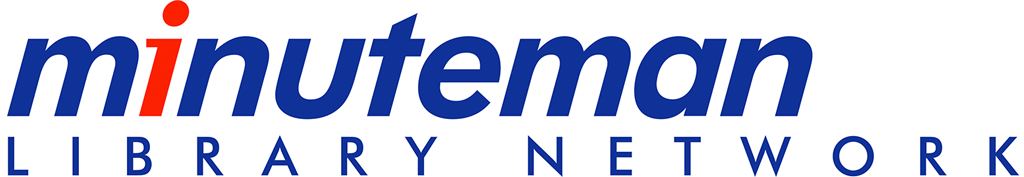
- Founded: December 19, 1983
- Type: Nonprofit organization, Library consortium
- Location: 10 Strathmore Road, Natick, Massachusetts 01760
- Region served: Counties of Middlesex (South), and portions of Norfolk.
- Owner: N/A
- Website: minlib.net
- Member of the Massachusetts Library System (MLS)

The Minuteman Library Network is a library consortium of over 40 public or academic libraries. The network consists of an aggregate collection of more than 5 million items and more than 690,000 cardholders, as of 2026. Membership card eligibility is open to persons who either live, work, or study in Massachusetts; and can be used to borrow items from its member libraries.

Founded as a cooperative, the network operates through the pooling and sharing of resources, and offers local library patrons additional services along with access to a more expansive catalog. For example, the network has a OverDrive e-book collection and allows users to sign in with their library card and borrow e-books and audio books from other consortium library networks in Massachusetts. However, since member libraries may individually offer further services even within the Minuteman Library Network, not all services are uniformly available at all member libraries.

== Libraries ==
Framingham Public Library entrance

The network largely spans the MetroWest area of eastern Massachusetts, in the Greater Boston Metropolitan area of the United States. The network encompasses the counties of Middlesex (South), and portions of Norfolk.

Public Libraries

- Acton Memorial Library
- Robbins Library, Arlington
- Ashland Public Library
- Bedford Free Public Library
- Belmont Public Library
- Public Library of Brookline
- Cambridge Public Library
- Concord Free Public Library
- Dedham Public Library
- Dover Town Library
- Framingham Public Library
- Franklin Public Library
- Holliston Public Library
- Cary Memorial Library, Lexington
- Lincoln Public Library
- Maynard Public Library
- Medfield Public Library
- Medford Public Library
- Medway Public Library
- Millis Public Library
- Morse Institute Library, Natick
- Bacon Free Library, Natick
- Needham Free Public Library
- Newton Free Library
- Morrill Memorial Library, Norwood
- Sherborn Public Library
- Somerville Public Library (Central Library, East Branch, West Branch)
- Randall Library, Stow
- Goodnow Library, Sudbury
- Waltham Public Library
- Watertown Free Public Library
- Wayland Free Public Library
- Wellesley Free Library
- Weston Public Library
- Westwood Public Library
- Winchester Public Library
- Woburn Public Library, Woburn

Academic libraries

- Dean College, E. Ross Anderson Library, Franklin
- Framingham State University, Henry Whittemore Library
- Lasell College, Brennan Library, Newton
- Olin College Library, Needham, Massachusetts
- Regis College Library, Weston

Former members

- Massachusetts Bay Community College, Perkins Library/Learning Resource Center, Wellesley & Framingham (moved to HELM)
- Mount Ida College, Wadsworth Learning Resource Center, Newton (closed 2018)
- Newbury College, Brookline, MA (closed 2019)
- Pine Manor College, Annenberg Library, Chestnut Hill (Now part of Boston College as Messina College)

== See also ==
- Cape Libraries Automated Materials Sharing (CLAMS)
- CW MARS (Central/Western Massachusetts Automated Resource Sharing)
- Merrimack Valley Library Consortium (MVLC)
- North of Boston Library Exchange (NOBLE)
- Old Colony Library Network (OCLN)
- SAILS Library Network
