= OCLN =

OCLN may refer to:

- Occludin, a protein
- Old Colony Library Network
