= Cape Libraries Automated Materials Sharing =

US library consortium in Massachusetts

Cape Libraries Automated Materials Sharing (Library Network)
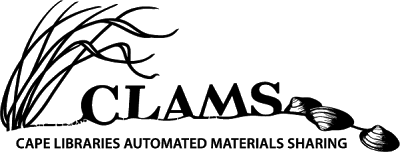
- Founded: 1988
- Type: Nonprofit organization, Library consortium
- Location: Cape Cod
- Region served: Cape Cod, Nantucket, Martha's Vineyard
- Members: 35 member libraries; 38 locations

The Cape Libraries Automated Materials Sharing (CLAMS) library network is a non-profit consortium of 35 member libraries and 38 locations throughout Cape Cod, Martha's Vineyard, and Nantucket. Since it was incorporated in 1988, the number of items available has grown from 568,000 in 1991 to over 1.6 million in 2022. Deliveries of materials between member libraries and other library networks in Massachusetts through an interlibrary loan program are made by the Massachusetts Library System located in Waltham. The network uses the Koha Integrated Library System (ILS) for staff function workflows: acquisitions, cataloging, circulation, ILL, and serials and Aspen Discovery for their patron's Online Public Access Catalog (OPAC). The libraries provide access to reference databases, digital libraries, free music online, museum passes, genealogy, workshops, and other free services that vary from each location.

== Digital services ==
Cape Libraries Automated Materials Sharing began a partnership with OverDrive in Spring 2008 to offer patrons 24 hours a day, 7 days a week access to a public digital library where they could check out ebook, audiobook, digital magazines, music, and video titles through the CLAMS OverDrive website. All of the public libraries participate in the OverDrive lending program. Cape Cod Community College is the only member of the CLAMS network that does not participate. However, students from the college are encouraged to obtain a CLAMS card from the library in the town that they live in. All towns on Cape Cod, Martha's Vineyard, and Nantucket have at least one library that is a member of the Cape Libraries Automated Materials Sharing network, except for the town of Sandwich.

The CLAMS library network is a participant in the state's Library eBooks and Audiobooks (LEA) program; it is a lending program that allows the patrons of one network to check out ebooks and audiobooks from the collection of another network. "This service is made possible by the CLAMS member libraries and the Massachusetts Board of Library Commissioners, with funding from the Institute of Museum and Library Services and the Commonwealth of Massachusetts."

== Member libraries ==
=== Public ===
- Aquinnah Public Library
- Sturgis Library, Barnstable
- Jonathan Bourne Public Library
- Brewster Ladies' Library
- Centerville Public Library
- Eldredge Public Library, Chatham
- Chilmark Free Public Library
- Cotuit Library (Barnstable)
- Jacob Sears Memorial Library, East Dennis
- Dennis Memorial Library, Dennis
- Dennis Public Library, Dennis Port
- South Dennis Free Public Library
- West Dennis Library
- Eastham Public Library
- Edgartown Public Library
- Falmouth Public Library
  - East Falmouth Library
  - North Falmouth Library
- West Falmouth Library
- Brooks Free Library, Harwich
- Hyannis Public Library (Barnstable)
- Marstons Mills Public Library (Barnstable)
- Mashpee Public Library
- Nantucket Atheneum Library
- Oak Bluffs Public Library
- Snow Library, Orleans
- Osterville Village Library (Barnstable)
- Provincetown Public Library
- Truro Public Library
- Vineyard Haven Public Library, Tisbury
- Wellfleet Public Library
- Whelden Memorial Library, West Barnstable
- West Tisbury Free Public Library
- Woods Hole Public Library (Falmouth)
- Yarmouth Port Library
- Yarmouth Town Libraries
  - South Yarmouth Library
  - West Yarmouth Library

=== Academic ===
- Cape Cod Community College, Wilkens Library

== See also ==
- C/W MARS (Central/Western Massachusetts Automated Resource Sharing)
- Merrimack Valley Library Consortium (MVLC)
- Minuteman Library Network (MLN)
- North of Boston Library Exchange (NOBLE)
- Old Colony Library Network (OCLN)
- SAILS Library Network
