= Merrimack Valley Library Consortium =

American library consortium in Massachusetts

The Merrimack Valley Library Consortium (MVLC) is an American library consortium created by Nancy Jacobson and Evelyn Kuo of Memorial Hall Library in Andover, Massachusetts in 1982. MVLC manages the resource sharing of 36 automated and partially automated libraries in Merrimack Valley region of northeastern Massachusetts, ensuring unified access to all of their catalogs, which represent almost three million items and more than six hundred thousand titles.

Most library cards in Massachusetts are valid at MVLC member libraries.

MVLC Libraries:

- Amesbury Public Library
- Memorial Hall Library, Andover
- Billerica Public Library
- Boxford Town Library
- Burlington Public Library
- Gleason Public Library, Carlisle
- Chelmsford Public Library
- Moses Greeley Parker Memorial Library, Dracut
- Dunstable Free Public Library, Dunstable
- Essex Town Hall and TOHP Burnham Library
- Georgetown Peabody Library
- Groton Public Library
- Langley-Adams Library, Groveland
- Hamilton-Wenham Public Library
- Haverhill Public Library
- Ipswich Public Library
- Lawrence Public Library
- Reuben Hoar Library, Littleton
- Pollard Memorial Library, Lowell
- Manchester-by-the-Sea Public Library
- Merrimac Public Library
- Nevins Memorial Library, Methuen
- Flint Public Library, Middleton
- Newbury Town Library
- Newburyport Public Library
- Stevens Memorial Library, North Andover
- Flint Memorial Library, North Reading
- Rockport Public Library
- Rowley Public Library
- Salisbury Public Library
- Tewksbury Public Library
- Topsfield Town Library
- Tyngsborough Public Library
- G.A.R. Memorial Library, West Newbury
- J. V. Fletcher Library, Westford
- Wilmington Memorial Library

== See also ==
- Cape Libraries Automated Materials Sharing (CLAMS)
- CW MARS (Central/Western Massachusetts Automated Resource Sharing)
- Minuteman Library Network (MLN)
- North of Boston Library Exchange (NOBLE)
- Old Colony Library Network (OCLN)
- SAILS Library Network
