= Simon Fairfield Public Library =

Library in Douglas, Massachusetts, U.S.

Coordinates: 42.0726°N 71.7136°W

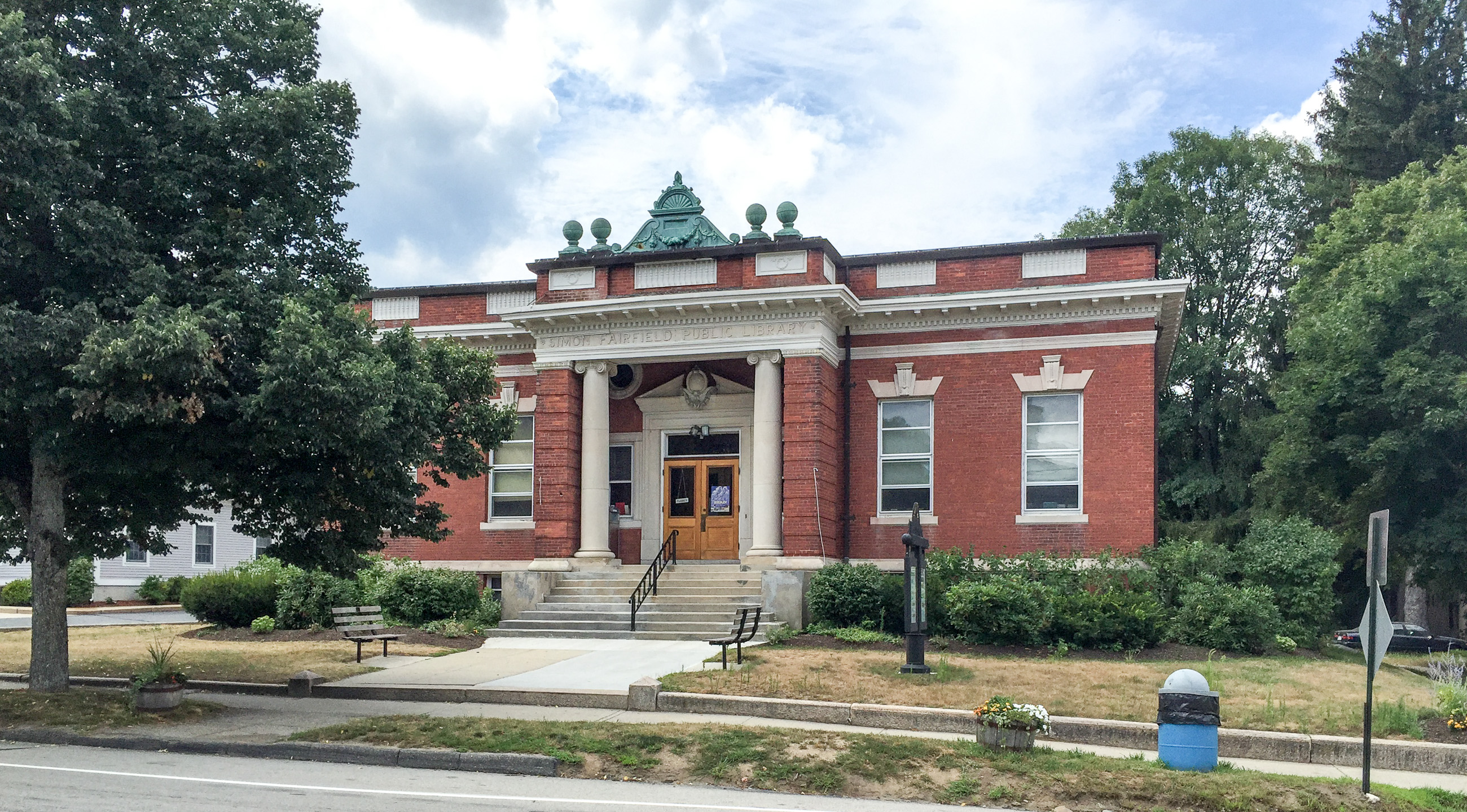
- Location: Douglas, Massachusetts, Massachusetts, United States
- Scope: Public library
- Established: 1903

Simon Fairfield Public Library is a public library in Douglas, Massachusetts.

James M. Fairfield was one of seven sons born to Simon and Phoebe Churchill Fairfield in Douglas, Massachusetts. He spent his boyhood with his close friend George Jepherson on his family's farm in South Douglas. He left Douglas at an early age and went on to accumulate great wealth from real estate in the city of Lawrence. His friendship with George and his love of this town remained with him for most of his life. Sometime during 1902 after discussing his wealth and what to do with it he and his friends decided to build a town library in Douglas. After visiting the Uxbridge Free Public Library they decided to give the town a lasting memorial to his parents. This landmark in history became the Simon Fairfield Public Library.

At a town meeting in 1903 the voters decided to accept this gift. The acceptance included a provision that the control and government of the library and the real estate be permanently vested in an eight-member board of trustees, three to be elected and five to be appointed. Fairfield appointed the first five to be Charles J. Batchellor, Winfield S. Schuster, Walter B. Fairfield, Aaron F. Jones, and James W. Wixtead.

The dedication was held at the Second Congregational Church. Mr. Fairfield was not in attendance. However he continued to support the library financially until his death.
