= Bolton Public Library =

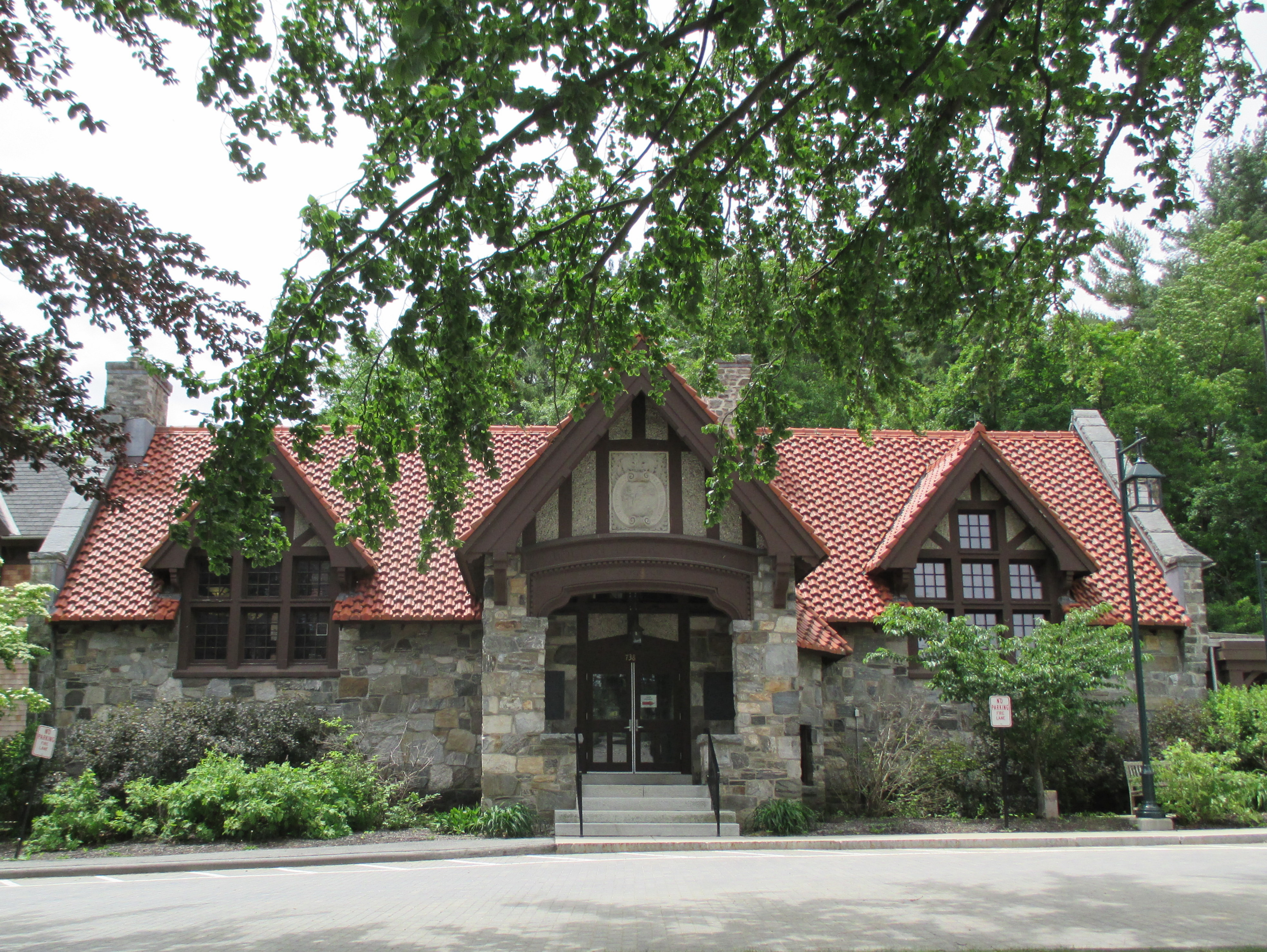
- Bolton Public Library, completed in 1904, in a notable Tudor Revival style, by Stone, Carpenter and Willson
- 42°26′5″N 71°36′42″W
- Location: Bolton, Massachusetts, US
- Type: Public Library
- Established: 1859
- Branches: 1

Collection
- Size: 50,000

Access and use
- Population served: 5,665

Other information
- Director: Kelly Collins
- Website: http://www.boltonma.us/library.php

The Bolton Public Library is a historic public library at 738 Main Street in Bolton, Massachusetts.

The library collection was originally founded in 1859 in the Selectmens' Room at the Town Hall. In 1901, sisters, Emma Whitney (1845–1898) and Anna Whitney, donated $10,000 to Bolton to construct the current library building in honor of their father, Captain Joseph Whitney (1802–1878). The library was constructed by Stone, Carpenter and Willson between 1903 and 1904 in an English Tudor Revival style, which was uncommon and notable in the town at that time. Mason Aden B. Allen used Bolton fieldstone on the exterior and today both the exterior and interior, which features oak woodwork and stone fireplaces, remain intact. A large addition opened in 2010. The library contains over 50,000 books and other items, and the Bolton Library is part of the CWMARS regional network and the Commonwealth Catalog network allowing for delivery of books from across the state.
