= SAILS Library Network =

Library consortium in Southeastern Massachusetts, US

- Founded: 1995
- Type: Nonprofit organization, Library consortium
- Location: Lakeville, Massachusetts
- Region served: Southeastern Massachusetts
- Members: 72 member libraries
- Employees: 7
- Website: www.sailsinc.org

The SAILS Library Network, formerly Southeastern Automated Integrated Library Services, is a nonprofit library consortium of 70 member libraries in 39 communities located throughout Southeastern Massachusetts. SAILS was founded in 1995 to link the ABLE and SEAL library networks, which were later dissolved into SAILS in 2000. The network provides library patrons with access to check out and return items at member libraries, interlibrary loans through the Massachusetts Board of Library Commissioners' Commonwealth Catalog, mobile app access, and access to electronic collections (including OverDrive). Member libraries are provided customized online catalog services, digital collections storage, internet and telecommunications services, email and Google Apps accounts for library staff, access to SirsiDynix software, and staff training.

Approximately 70 percent of funding for SAILS comes from dues from member libraries, with the remaining portion coming from government subsidies and grants. In fiscal year 2017, the network's 463,000 patrons checked out almost 3.6 million items, worth an estimated $44 million. Deliveries of materials between member libraries and other library networks in Massachusetts through an interlibrary loan program are made by the Massachusetts Library System, which has offices in Northampton and Marlborough. The network uses SirsiDynix integrated library system (ILS) for staff function workflows: acquisitions, cataloging, circulation, ILL, and serials as well as for their patron's Online Public Access Catalog (OPAC). The libraries provide access to reference databases, digital libraries, access to free music online, museum passes, genealogy, workshops, and other free services that vary from each location. In 2018, the network introduced automatic renewals on most items.

== Member libraries ==
=== Public libraries ===
- Acushnet Public Library
- Guildford H. Hathaway Public Library (Assonet)
- Attleboro Public Library
- Berkley Public Library (Massachusetts)
- Bridgewater Public Library
- Carver Public Library
- Dartmouth - North Dartmouth Library
- Dartmouth - Southworth Library
- Dighton Public Library
- East Bridgewater Public Library
- James White Memorial Library (East Freetown)
- Ames Free Library (Easton)
- The Millicent Library (Fairhaven)
- Fall River Main
- Charlton Library of Fall River History
- Boyden Library (Foxboro)
- Holmes Public Library (Halifax)
- Hanson Public Library
- Lakeville Public Library
- Mansfield Public Library
- Elizabeth Taber Library (Marion)
- Mattapoisett Free Public Library
- Middleborough Public Library
- New Bedford Bookmobile
- Casa da Saudade Library (New Bedford)
- Howland-Green Library (New Bedford)
- Lawler Library (New Bedford)
- New Bedford Main Library
- Wilks Library (New Bedford)
- Norfolk Public Library
- Richards Memorial Library (North Attleboro)
- Norton Public Library
- Pembroke Public Library
- Plainville Public Library
- Plympton Public Library
- Raynham Public Library
- Blanding Public Library (Rehoboth)
- Joseph H. Plumb Memorial Library (Rochester, Massachusetts)
- SAILS Headquarters
- Seekonk Public Library
- Somerset Public Library
- Swansea Public Library
- Taunton Public Library
- Spinney Memorial Branch Library (Wareham
- Wareham Free Library
- West Bridgewater Public Library
- Westport Free Public Library
- Fiske Public Library (Wrentham)

=== Academic libraries ===
- Apponequet Regional High School (Freetown/Lakeville)
- Attleboro High School
- Beckwith Middle School (Rehoboth)
- Dighton Elementary School
- Dighton Middle School
- Dighton-Rehoboth Regional High School (Dighton)
- B.M.C. Durfee High School (Fall River)
- East Bridgewater Central School
- East Bridgewater High School
- John J. Ahern Middle School (Foxborough)
- Foxborough High School
- American Bureau of Shipping Information Commons (Massachusetts Maritime Academy)
- New Bedford High School
- Freeman Kennedy School (Norfolk)
- H. Olive Day School (Norfolk)
- Palmer River Elementary School (Rehoboth)
- George R. Martin Elementary School (Seekonk)
- Dr. Kevin M. Hurley Middle School (Seekonk)
- Mildred H. Aitken Elementary School (Seekonk)
- Seekonk High School
- Somerset Berkley Regional High School
- Southeastern Regional School District
- Delaney Elementary School (Wrentham)
- Roderick Elementary School (Wrentham)

== See also ==
- Cape Libraries Automated Materials Sharing (CLAMS)
- CW MARS (Central/Western Massachusetts Automated Resource Sharing)
- Merrimack Valley Library Consortium (MVLC)
- Minuteman Library Network (MLN)
- North of Boston Library Exchange (NOBLE)
- Old Colony Library Network (OCLN)
