= Northborough Free Library =

Public library in Northborough, Massachusetts, United States

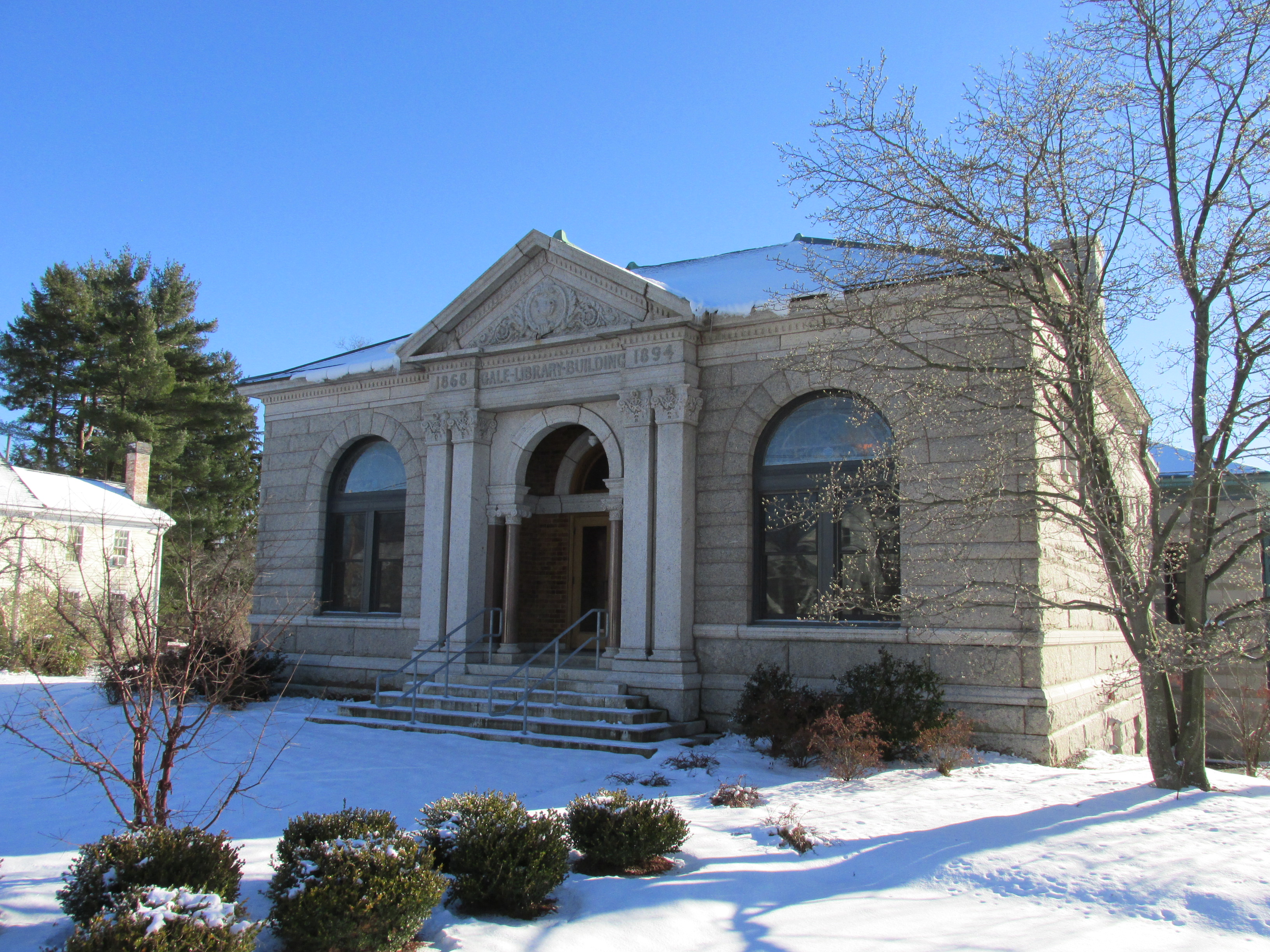
Northborough Free Library

The Northborough Free Library is a public library serving the town of Northborough, Massachusetts. It was founded in 1868. Today it is a member of the C/W MARS network and provides library service to the 14,155 residents of Northborough and people of neighboring towns. In fiscal year 2009, the Library received 1.5% of the town budget, or $645,208 ($43.41 per resident.) Currently located at 34 Main Street, it has a staff of twelve full-time and part-time employees and is overseen by a board of trustees.

== History ==
Prior to 1868, other libraries had been established in Northborough, including the Free Parish Library and Society Library which united to form the Free Library of the Congregational Society, the Young Ladies’ Library, the Free Juvenile Library, and the Agricultural Library. In 1867 the Northborough Library Association was formed for the purpose of raising money to purchase books for a free town library. In addition to the money raised, prominent citizens including Captain Cyrus Gale made donations. A board of trustees was elected and the Library was launched in the newly constructed Town Hall in 1868. The collection quickly outgrew the space, and the Library was permanently relocated to a new building donated by Gale's son, Cyrus Gale Jr, in 1894. The building was designed by Worcester architect Amos P. Cutting.

== Departments and collections ==
The Library consists of the following departments: Circulation, Children's Services, Teen Services, and Adult Services. Along with providing access to library materials, the Library also sponsors programs for patrons of all ages, including crafts and story time for children, a teen advisory group, and book groups for adults. The collection consists of more than 70,000 books and over 5,000 videos, CDs, periodicals, and e-books. Research help is also available, with the library offering free access to various databases.

== Renovation ==
Between 2007 and 2009 the Library underwent a major expansion and renovation. The Library in 2007 consisted of the 1895 original and a 1975 addition, totaling 15,000 square feet. Plans for expansion began in 1998 when funds were appropriated for a new design. Funds for the renovation came from state, local, and private donations. Construction was delayed from its anticipated start because of an injunction filed against the Town by the lowest bidder for the project, who was passed over after a background check. Federal Appeals Court ruled in the Town's favor. The library collections and operations were moved to a temporary location during the construction, which lasted from November 2007 to January 2009. The 1975 addition was demolished and a 21,000 square foot addition was made in its place; the historic 1894 building was renovated. The Library reopened in March 2009.
