= North of Boston Library Exchange =

Library consortium in Massachusetts, U.S.

- Type: Library network
- Region served: North Shore (Massachusetts)
- Website: https://www.noblenet.org/

The North of Boston Library Exchange (NOBLE) is a consortium of 25 libraries on the North Shore of Massachusetts working to improve library service through automation. Seventeen public libraries, seven college libraries, and one special library are members.

NOBLE was the first automated resource sharing network in the state and the first Massachusetts library network on the Internet.

It was established in 1980 by five libraries sharing their circulation system. By 1995, NOBLE served 32,000 college students and 522,000 residents and kept a database that featured more than 2.3 million items.

NOBLE is governed by its member libraries who approve the annual budget, establish NOBLE policies, and elect officers. An executive board, composed of the four officers and five at-large library directors, more closely oversees NOBLE operations. A professional staff manages operations. NOBLE is a 501(c)(3) non-profit corporation and is recognized as a charitable organization by the Massachusetts Attorney General's office.

== Member libraries ==
=== Public libraries ===
- Beverly Public Library
- Peabody Institute Library of Danvers
- Everett Public Libraries
- Sawyer Free Library, Gloucester
- Lynn Public Library
- Lynnfield Public Library
- Abbot Public Library, Marblehead
- Melrose Public Library
- Peabody Institute Library, Peabody
- Reading Public Library
- Revere Public Library
- Salem Public Library
- Saugus Public Library
- Stoneham Public Library
- Swampscott Public Library
- Lucius Beebe Memorial Library, Wakefield
- Winthrop Public Library and Museum

=== Special library ===
- Massachusetts Board of Library Commissioners Professional Library, Boston

=== Academic libraries ===
- Bunker Hill Community College Library, Charlestown
- Endicott College, Halle Library, Beverly
- Gordon College, Jenks Library, Wenham
- Merrimack College, McQuade Library, North Andover
- Montserrat College of Art, Scott Library, Beverly
- Phillips Academy, Oliver Wendell Holmes Library, Andover
- Salem State University Library, Salem

== See also ==
- Cape Libraries Automated Materials Sharing (CLAMS)
- CW MARS (Central/Western Massachusetts Automated Resource Sharing)
- Merrimack Valley Library Consortium (MVLC)
- Minuteman Library Network (MLN)
- Old Colony Library Network (OCLN)
- SAILS Library Network
