= Thayer Public Library =

- U.S. National Register of Historic Places
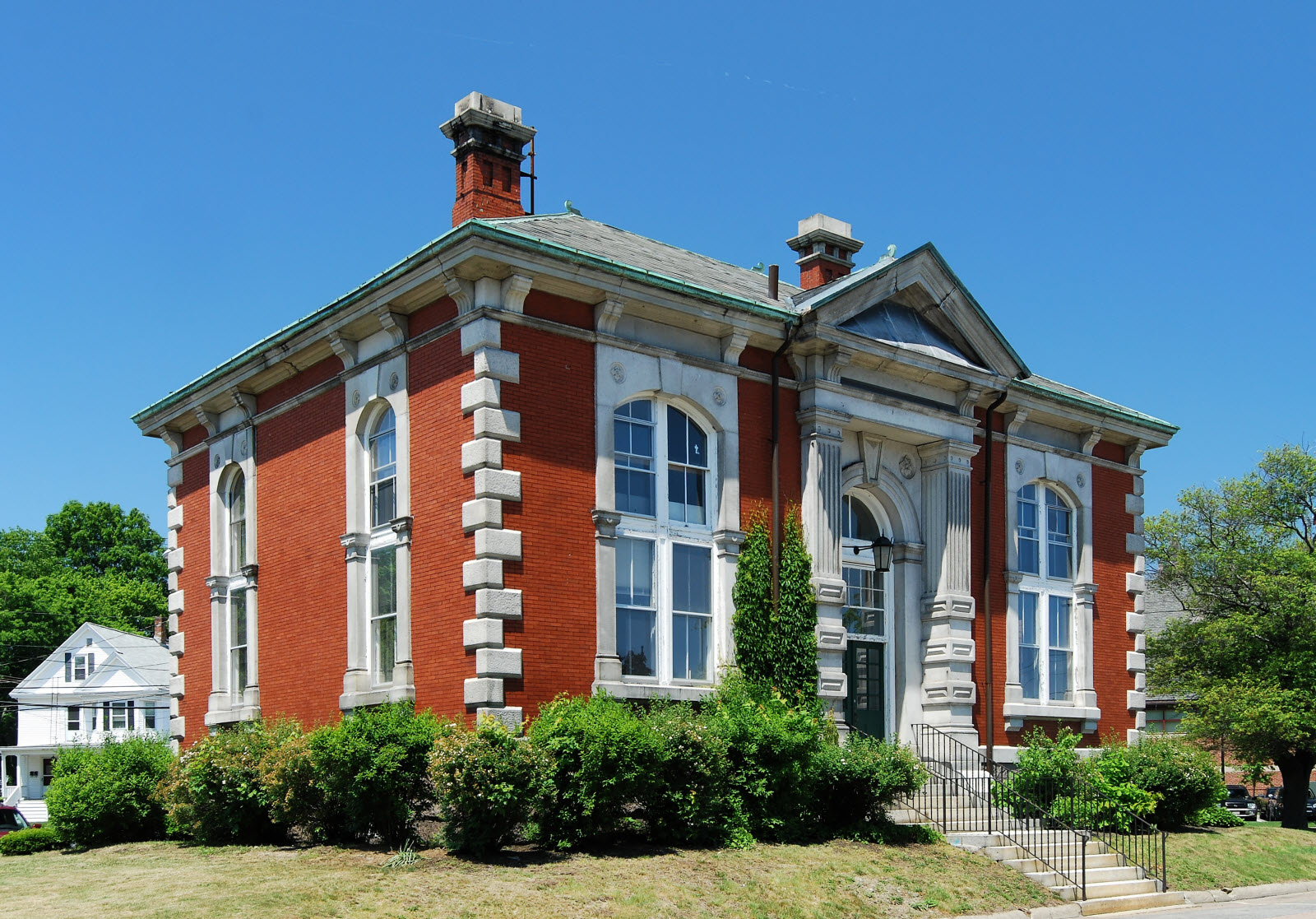
- Original library (1874-1953)

- Location within Massachusetts Location within the United States
- Location: 2 John F. Kennedy Memorial Dr., Braintree, Massachusetts
- Coordinates: 42°12′24.2″N 71°0′17.8″W
- Area: 1 acre (0.40 ha)
- Built: 1874
- Architect: Hammatt Billings & Joseph E. Billings
- Architectural style: Renaissance
- NRHP reference No.: 78000446
- Added to NRHP: July 21, 1978

The Thayer Public Library is a public library located in the town of Braintree, Massachusetts with 102,000 books, 200 periodical subscriptions, and 8,000 videos, DVDs, music CDs, and audiobooks. The library is a member of the Old Colony Library Network.

== About the library ==
The library is named for General Sylvanus Thayer, who helped found it through a $30,000 bequest in his will. The original building was dedicated June 4, 1874, and opened to the public in September of the same year. It operated as a library until 1953, when it was replaced by a larger building across the street. The 1874 building was occupied by the Braintree Water Department for many years, but is currently vacant. This building was listed on the National Register of Historic Places in 1978.

In 1997, the 1953 library building was razed and replaced by the current three-story brick postmodern building that opened in 1999.

== Antitrust lawsuit participation ==
In March 2008, the Thayer Public Library was notified that it was among several libraries in Massachusetts that would share in the 2002 settlement of an antitrust case that was brought against BMG, EMI Music, Warner Music Group, and Sony Music Entertainment by the antitrust division of Massachusetts Attorney General Martha Coakley’s office, along with the Attorneys General of thirty-nine other states. The lawsuit was settled in 2002 for $144 million, and alleged that the music distribution companies illegally inflated the price of CDs by requiring retailers to sell them at or above a set level in order to qualify for substantial advertising funding.

== See also ==
- National Register of Historic Places listings in Norfolk County, Massachusetts
