= Morse Institute Library =

American public library, founded 1808

Coordinates: 42.2846°N 71.3458°W

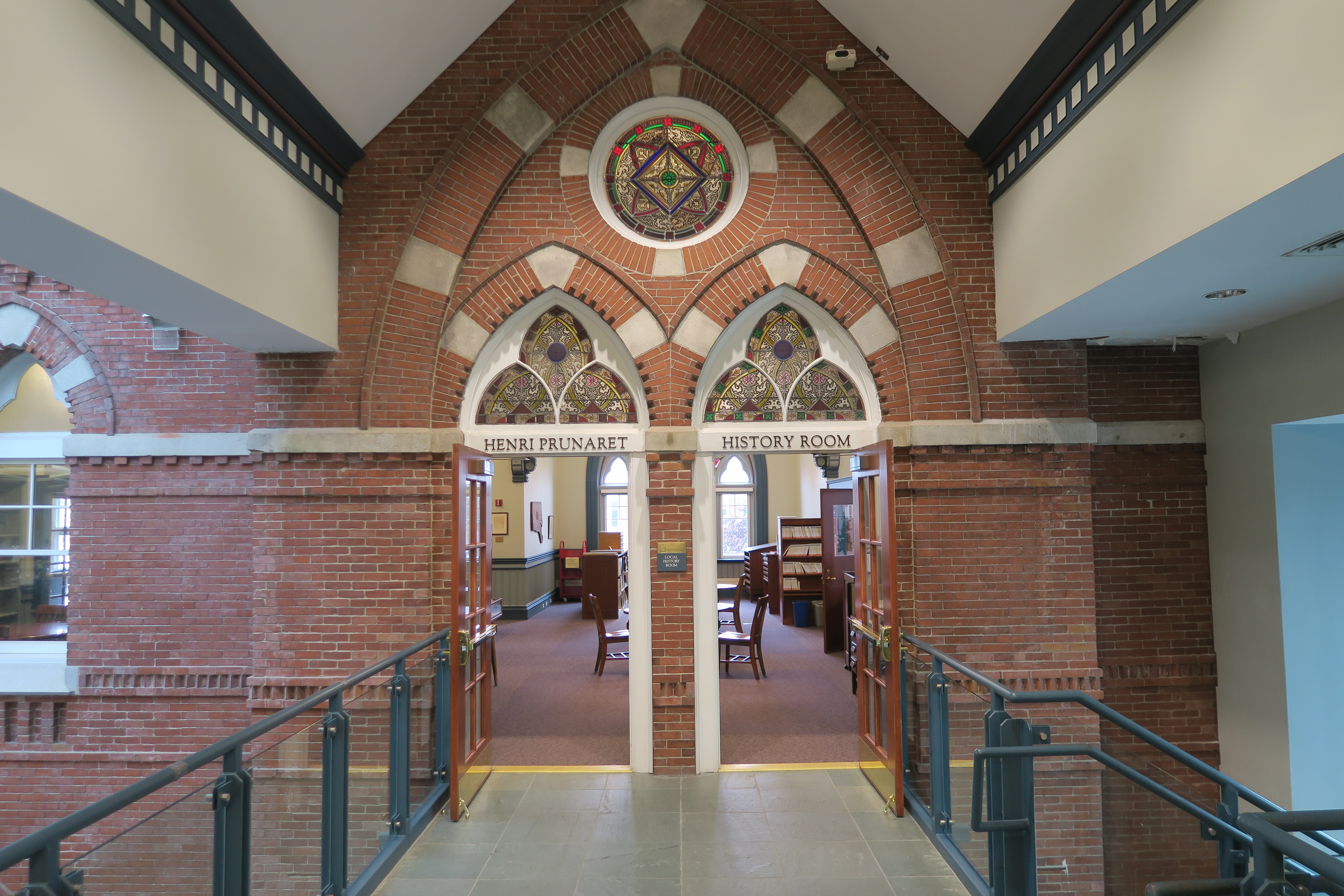
- Henri Prunaret History Room
- Location: 14 East Central Street; Natick, Massachusetts
- Established: 1808

Other information
- Website: morseinstitute.libguides.com

The Morse Institute Library is a public library in Natick, Massachusetts that has existed for over 200 years. The library is part of the Minuteman Library Network, a consortium of 43 libraries that provide services to members in the MetroWest region of Massachusetts.

== History ==
In 1808, the library began as a collection of about 100 books by Samuel Morse. He was a portrait artist and had an interest in developing a circulating library. By 1852, the collection, entitled the Citizen's Library, amassed 425 books. The Morse Institute Library was instituted in 1862 by Mary Ann Morse, Samuel Morse's granddaughter. Over the next several years, Mary Ann began the processes of raising funds and obtaining district approval. The collection opened to the public on December 25, 1873.

As of January 2017, the library was governed by a five-member board of trustees elected by popular vote to five-year terms. The library has around 200,000 books, magazines, newspapers, DVDs, CDs, and audiobooks.

== Initiatives ==
The library organizes events open to the public including book clubs, English immersion classes, and movie nights.

One major project is the Natick Veterans Oral History Project. In 1998, Eugene Dugdale, who was a Pearl Harbor survivor, proposed a project to "collect and preserve the personal recollections of those men and women who have served their country in the armed forces past and present." The collection has firsthand accounts of veterans from World War II, Korean War, Vietnam War, Persian Gulf War, and the conflicts in Afghanistan and Iraq. The administrators of the program work in collaboration with the Natick Public Schools System and the Library of Congress. As of 2023, the project has more than 350 interviews in its collection.
