= Belmont Public Library =

Library in Belmont, Massachusetts

Coordinates: 42°23′40.5″N 71°10′20.5″W

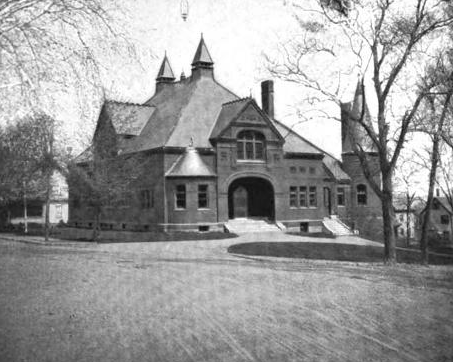
The former Belmont Town Hall and Public Library in 1899.

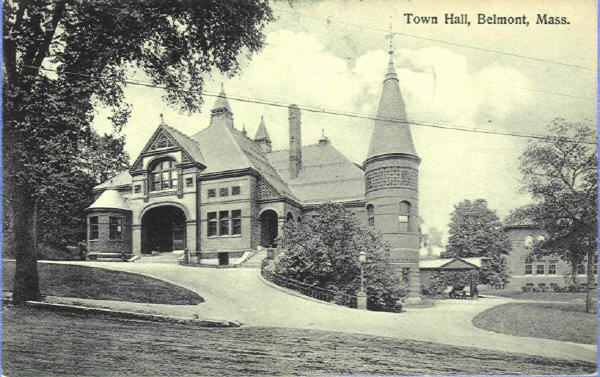
The former Belmont Town Hall and Public Library in 1913.

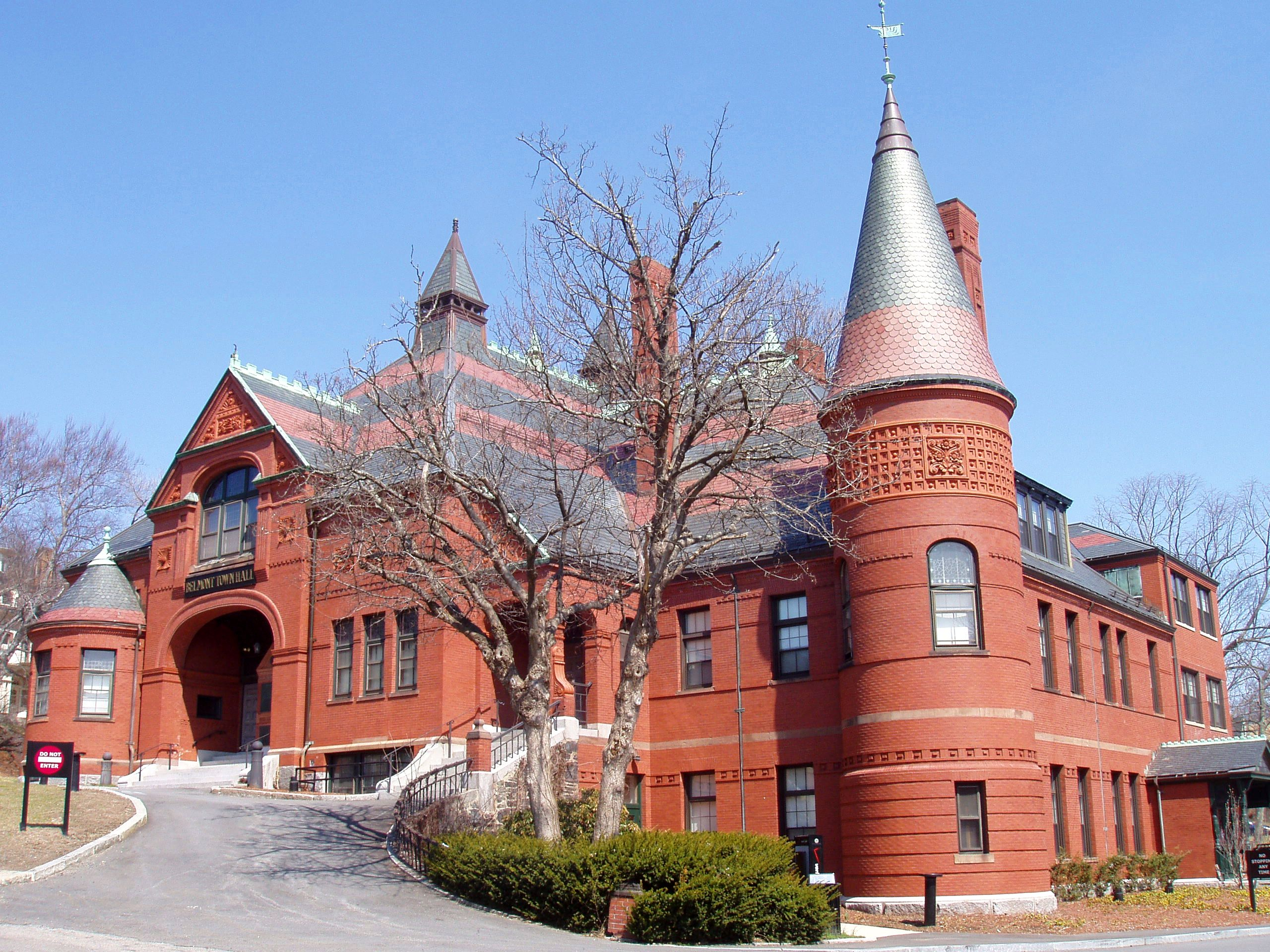
The former Belmont Public Library in 2007.

The current Belmont Public Library in 2026.

The Belmont Public Library is a public library in Belmont, Massachusetts. It is a member of the Minuteman Library Network. It is located on Concord Avenue near Belmont Center.

== Buildings ==
The library has been housed in four buildings.

Originally, it was housed in the Belmont Town Hall, designed by architects Hartwell and Richardson and completed in 1881.

In 1902, a new facility was donated by Henry Oliver Underwood and opened in 1902. The building is on Pleasant Street and now serves as the School Administration Building.

In 1965, the Belmont Memorial Library on Concord Avenue was opened.

In 2024, the Belmont Memorial Library was torn down, with a planned opening of a new building in Fall 2025. The new building opened in early 2026.

== Administration ==
The current library director is Peter Struzziero.
