= Stoughton Public Library =

Coordinates: 42.1228°N 71.0989°W

The Stoughton Public Library is part of the Old Colony Library Network (OCLN), a cooperative of libraries located on the South Shore of Massachusetts. In addition to books and print materials, the library offers patrons access to eBooks and databases through the OCLN, as well as lending museum passes to area museums and zoos, coordinating free tutoring for adults in Basic Literacy and English to Speakers of Other Languages, and housing local historical and genealogical materials in the Stoughton Collection. Established in 1874, the library is currently temporarily located at 529 Washington Street, Stoughton, MA. The permanent location, at 84 Park Street, is undergoing a large-scale renovation to expand the library's current space from 22,000 square feet to 31,058 square feet and is projected to re-open in May 2018.

== History ==
March 12, 1874 was the first meeting of the Board of Trustees of the Stoughton Public Library, preceding the opening of the library on March 17 at its original location in Morton Square. Wales French was the first to hold the position of librarian. In 1881 the Board applied to businessman and philanthropist Andrew Carnegie for funding for a dedicated library building and was denied.

The library moved three times and by 1900 was located inside Stoughton Town Hall. In 1902 the Board of Trustees requested private donations to build a library. Lucius B. Clapp, a local farmer, selectman, and library trustee, anonymously donated $25,000 to cover the cost of the building. A donation from Henry L. Pierce was used to purchase books. The architect, Walter Atherton, was trained at the Massachusetts Institute of Technology and at the L’Ecole des Beaux Arts in Paris and had been raised on the lot adjacent to the land purchased from his family to be used for the library. The library, a brick Georgian Revival, was dedicated on June 30, 1904. The building housed the library as well as the Stoughton Historical Society at 6 Park Street.

In 1969 a modern library was built to meet the needs of the town at nearby 84 Park Street. The old building was renamed the Lucius Clapp Memorial and continued to house the Stoughton Historical Society. The new 22,000 square foot building with a 96,000 book capacity acquired the name Stoughton Public Library.

In May 2011 Stoughton residents approved a $14 million renovation to the library. The funding includes $7 million in a matching grant from the Massachusetts Public Library Construction Program. The renovated space will increase the size of the library to 31,058 square feet and will include improvements to make it accessible to patrons with disabilities as well as adding a cafe on the second floor. Boston-based architecture firm Finegold Alexander Architects designed the renovated space.
