= Old Colony Library Network =

Library consortium in eastern Massachusetts, US

The Old Colony Library Network (OCLN) is a consortium of 27 member libraries located on the South Shore of Massachusetts in the United States. OCLN membership includes 26 town and city libraries and one academic library. OCLN's cooperative approach enables member libraries to provide services that they would not be able to afford separately. OCLN was founded in 1984 and is incorporated in Massachusetts as a 501(c)(3) corporation. OCLN is recognized as a charitable organization by the Massachusetts Attorney General's office.

OCLN member libraries:

Public libraries:

- Abington Public Library (website)
- Avon Public Library (website)
- Thayer Public Library, Braintree
- Brockton Public Library (website)
- Canton Public Library (website)
- Paul Pratt Memorial Library, Cohasset (website)
- Duxbury Free Library (website)
- John Curtis Free Library, Hanover (website)
- Hingham Public Library (website)
- Holbrook Public Library (website)
- Hull Public Library (website)
- Kingston Public Library (website)
- Ventress Memorial Library, Marshfield (website)
- Milton Public Library (website)
- Norwell Public Library (website)
- Plymouth Public Library (website)
- Thomas Crane Public Library, Quincy (website)
- Turner Free Library, Randolph (website)
- Rockland Memorial Library (website)
- Sandwich Public Library (website)
- Scituate Town Library (website)
- Sharon Public Library (website)
- Stoughton Public Library (website)
- Walpole Public Library (website)
- Weymouth Public Libraries (Tufts and Fogg)
- Whitman Public Library (website)

Academic library:

- Quincy College, Quincy and Plymouth

Former members:

- Eastern Nazarene College, Quincy, Nease Library (the college closed in December 2024)
- Massasoit Community College Library (migrated to HELM in June 2019)

== See also ==
- Cape Libraries Automated Materials Sharing (CLAMS)
- CW MARS (Central/Western Massachusetts Automated Resource Sharing)
- Merrimack Valley Library Consortium (MVLC)
- Minuteman Library Network (MLN)
- North of Boston Library Exchange (NOBLE)
- SAILS Library Network
