= Abbot Public Library =

Massachusetts public library

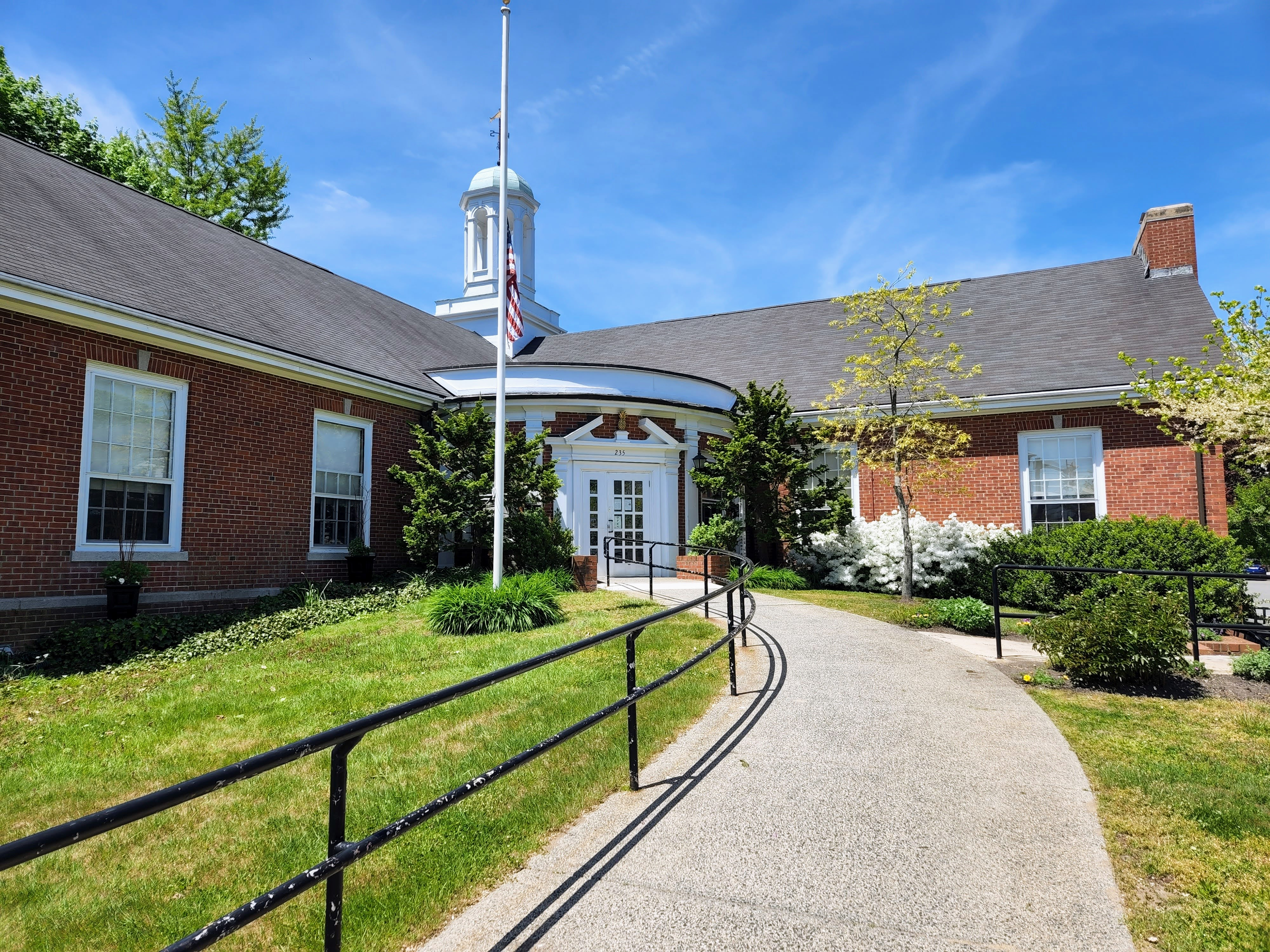
Abbot Library, Pleasant Street, Marblehead, MA

The Abbot Public Library is a library in Marblehead, Massachusetts. The building is located at 235 Pleasant Street. The Library is a member of the North of Boston Library Exchange (NOBLE) consortium. The grounds are maintained by the Driftwood Garden Club. Book sales are organized by the Friends of the Abbot Public Library and fundraising is organized by the Abbot Public Library Foundation.

== History ==
In 1872 Benjamin Abbot left $103,000 to the town of Marblehead and Abbot Hall was built in 1877 which included a reading room and library.

Oversight of the library was given to a board of trustees elected by the town. Books were first loaned in the spring of 1878. Mary G. Brown was the first librarian.

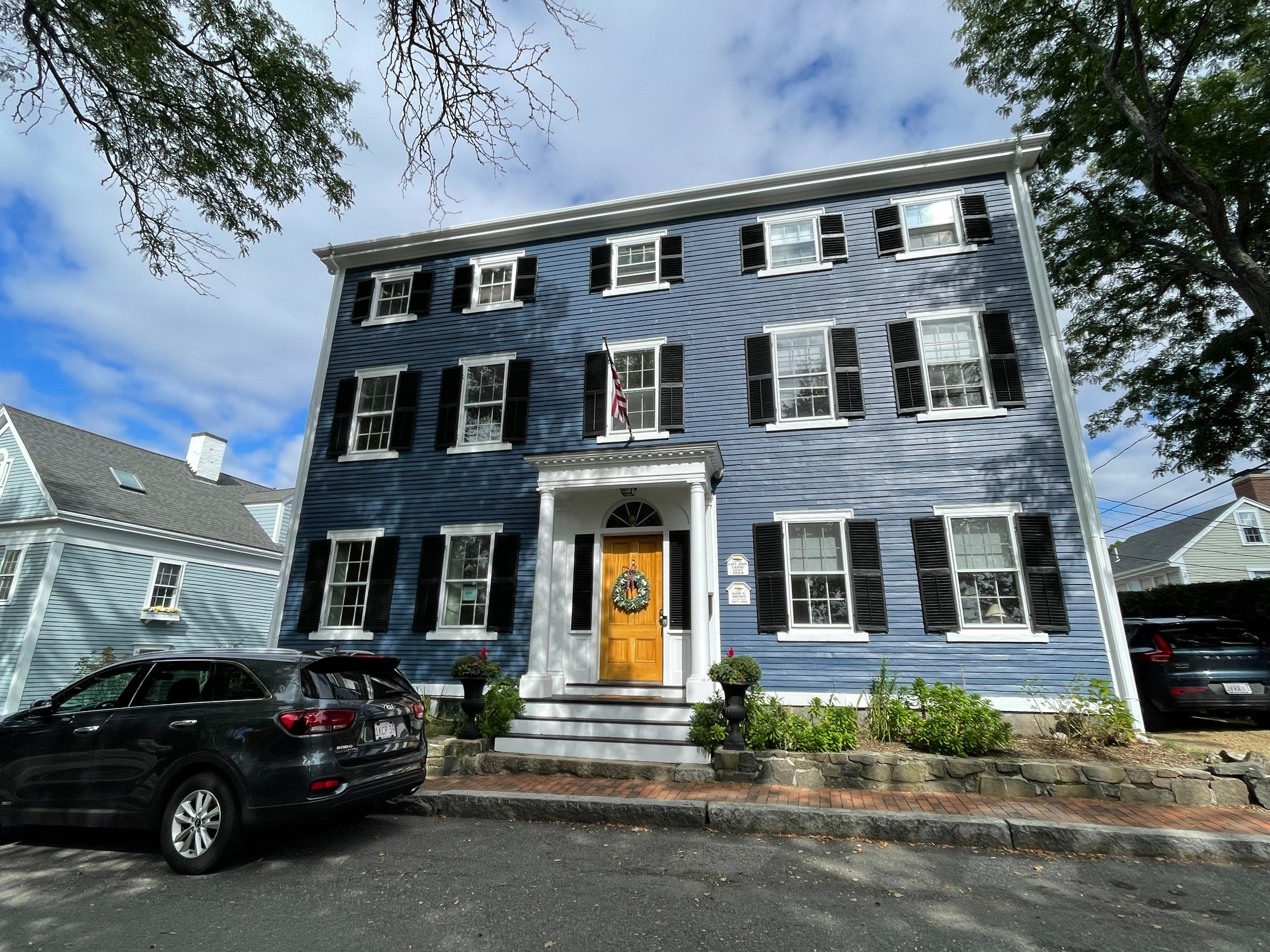
House of Mary Brown, the first librarian in Marblehead, Massachusetts.

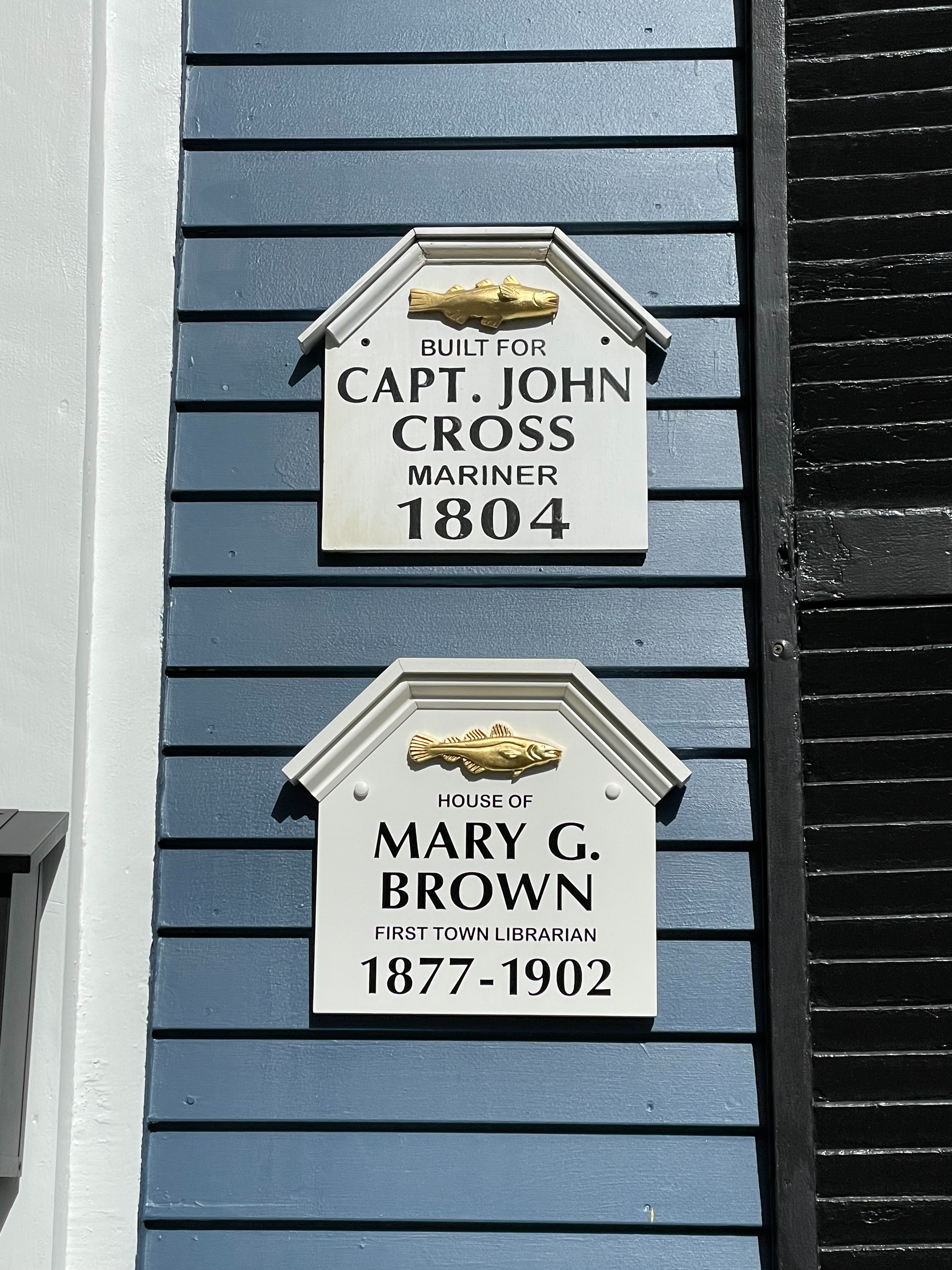
House of Mary Brown, the first librarian in Marblehead, Massachusetts.

In 1931, the Clifton Branch Library opened in the Hobbs Memorial Building on Clifton Avenue.

Gregory O. Lyon bequeathed $20,000 to the Town of Marblehead for the construction of a new library. The library moved to a new building at 235 Pleasant Street in 1954.

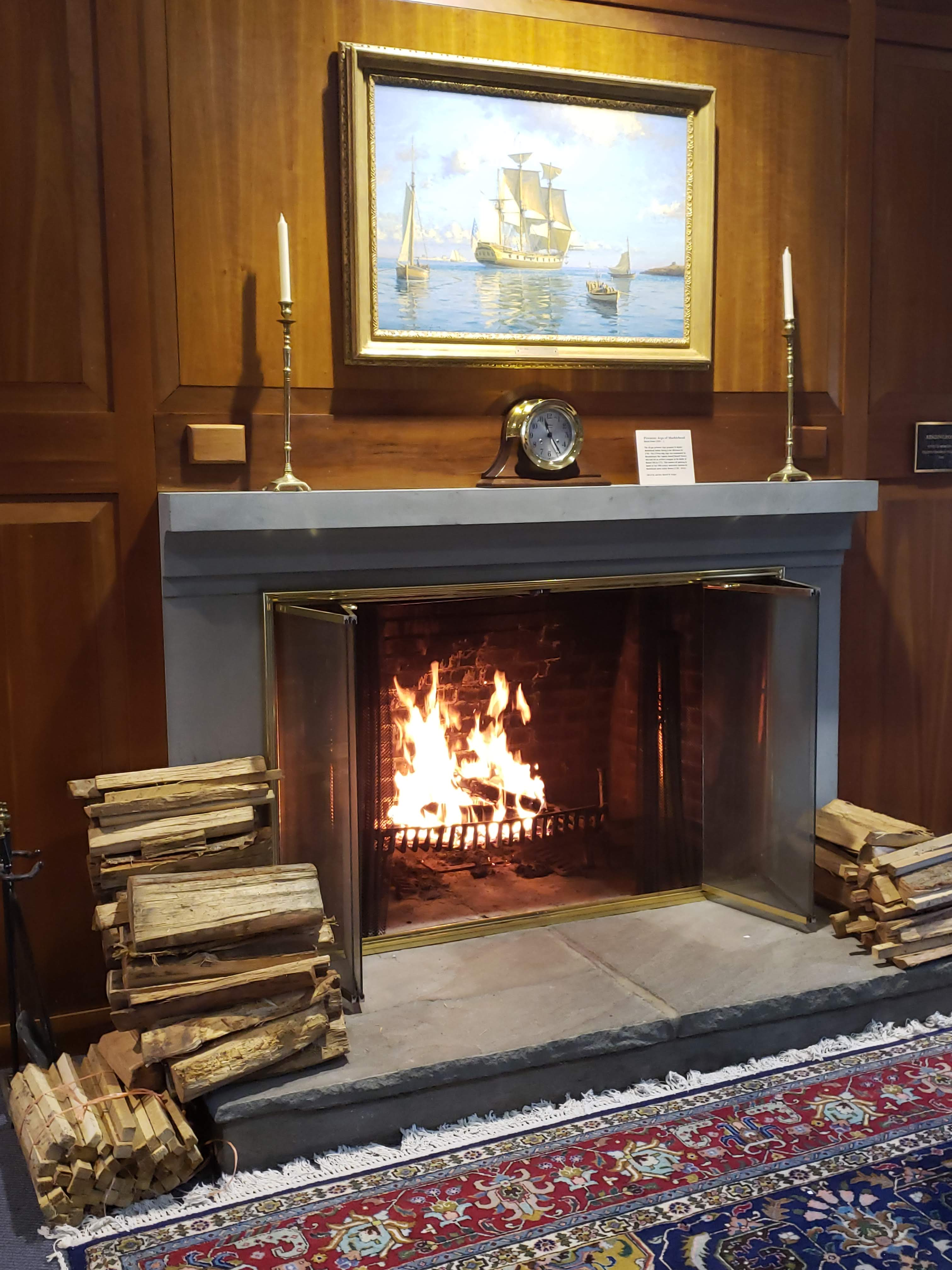
Reading Room at Abbot Library on Pleasant Street

The Friends of the Abbot Public Library helped preserve the Messenger, a Marblehead newspaper, on microfilm. The microfilm was digitized in 2019 by Advantage Archives.

In the fall of 2022, the library moved to an interim space on Brook Road, the site of the old Eveleth School, while major renovations and upgrades take place. Renovations included upgrades in technology, new meeting spaces, a new Americans with Disabilities Act (ADA) accessible garden as well as electrical upgrades and a new HVAC system. The Abbot Library Foundation has raised money for this project and was able to donate money back to the town.

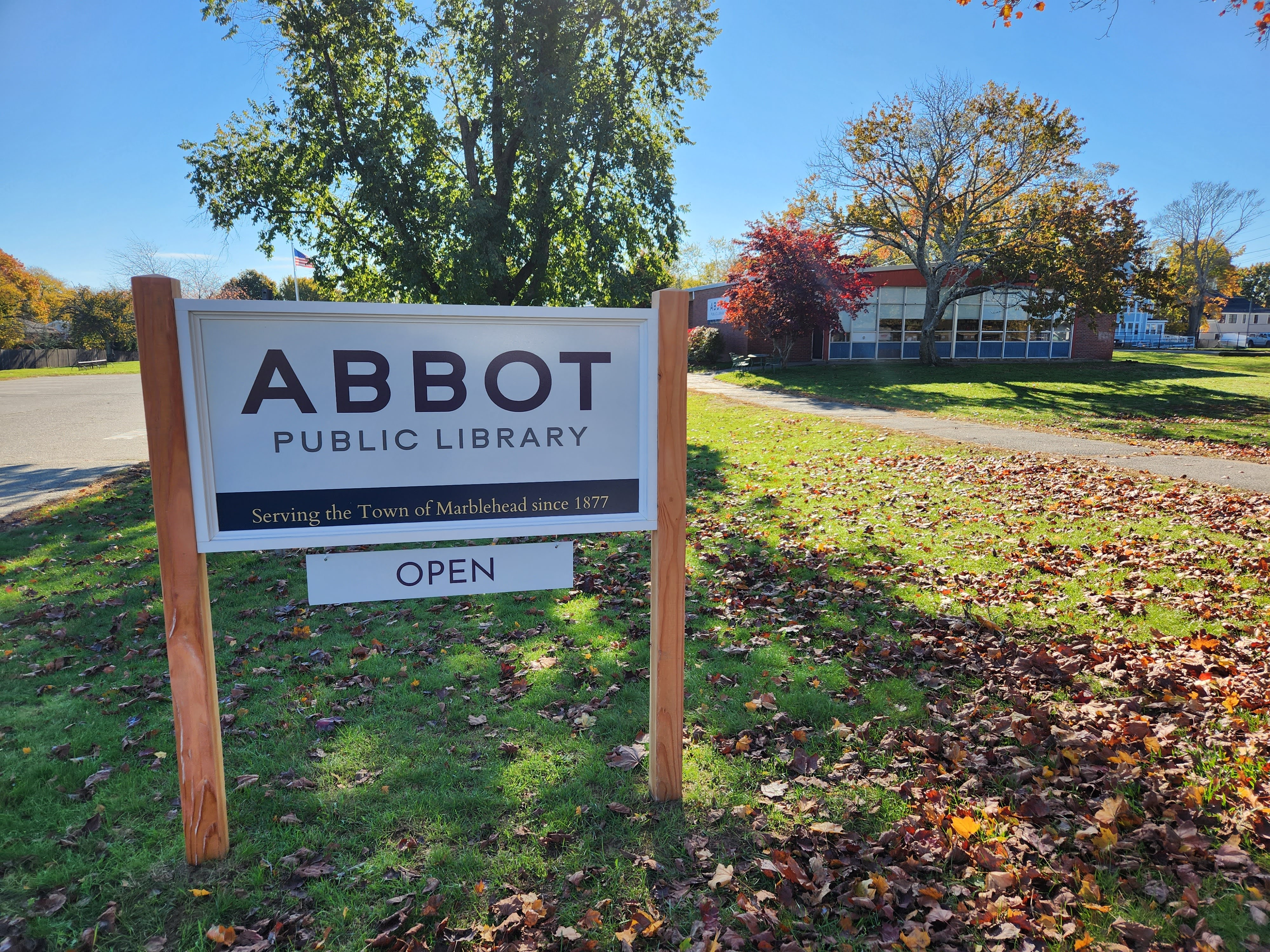
Abbot Library on Brook Road 2022

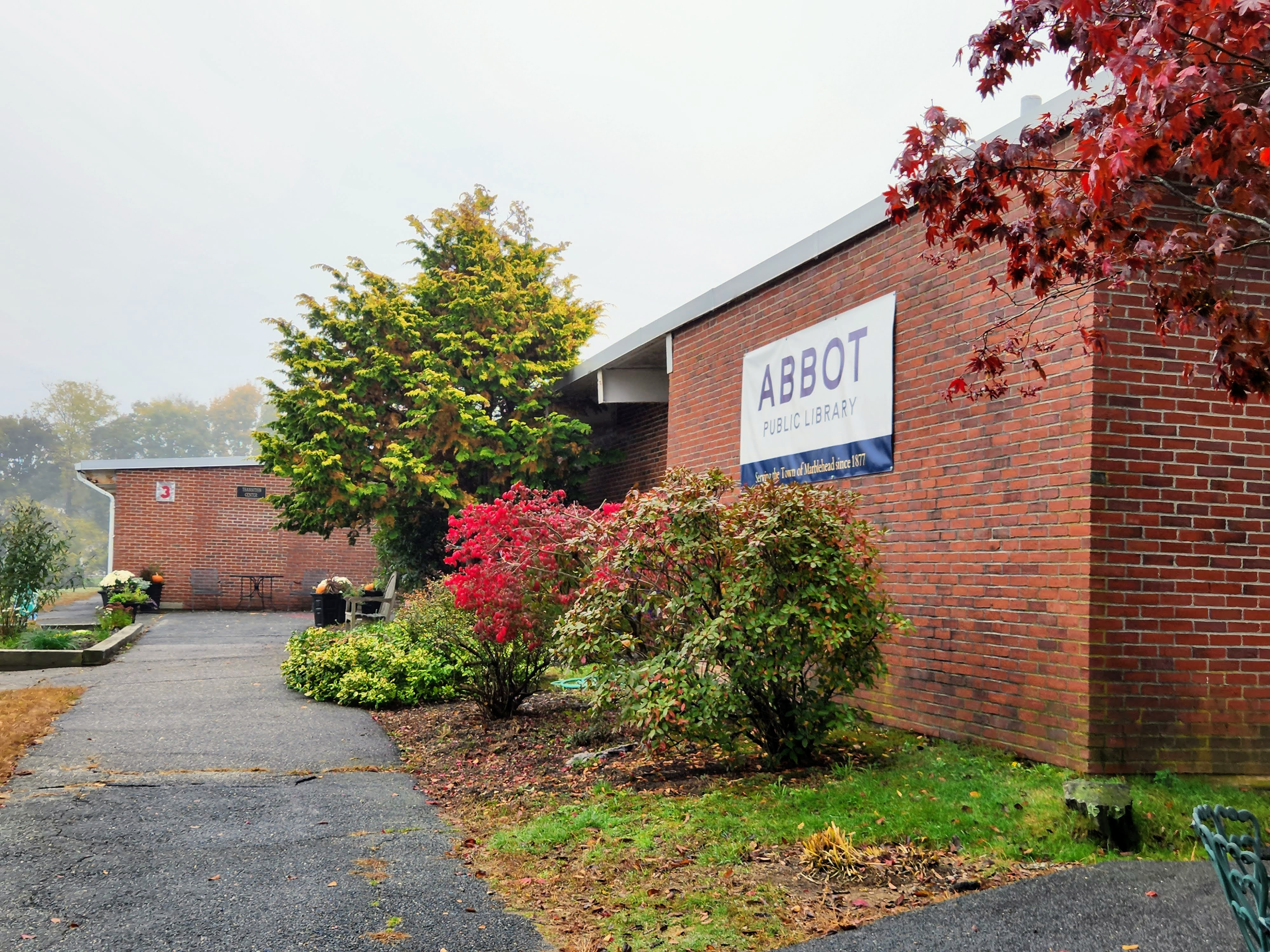
Abbot Library on Brook Road 2022

July 5–7, 2024 the library opened its doors to the public following the renovation to host the Marblehead Literary Festival, an event that is part of the annual Marblehead Festival of the Arts. Guest authors included Eric Jay Dolin, Hank Phillippi Ryan and Julia Glass. The library opened for service July 10, 2024.

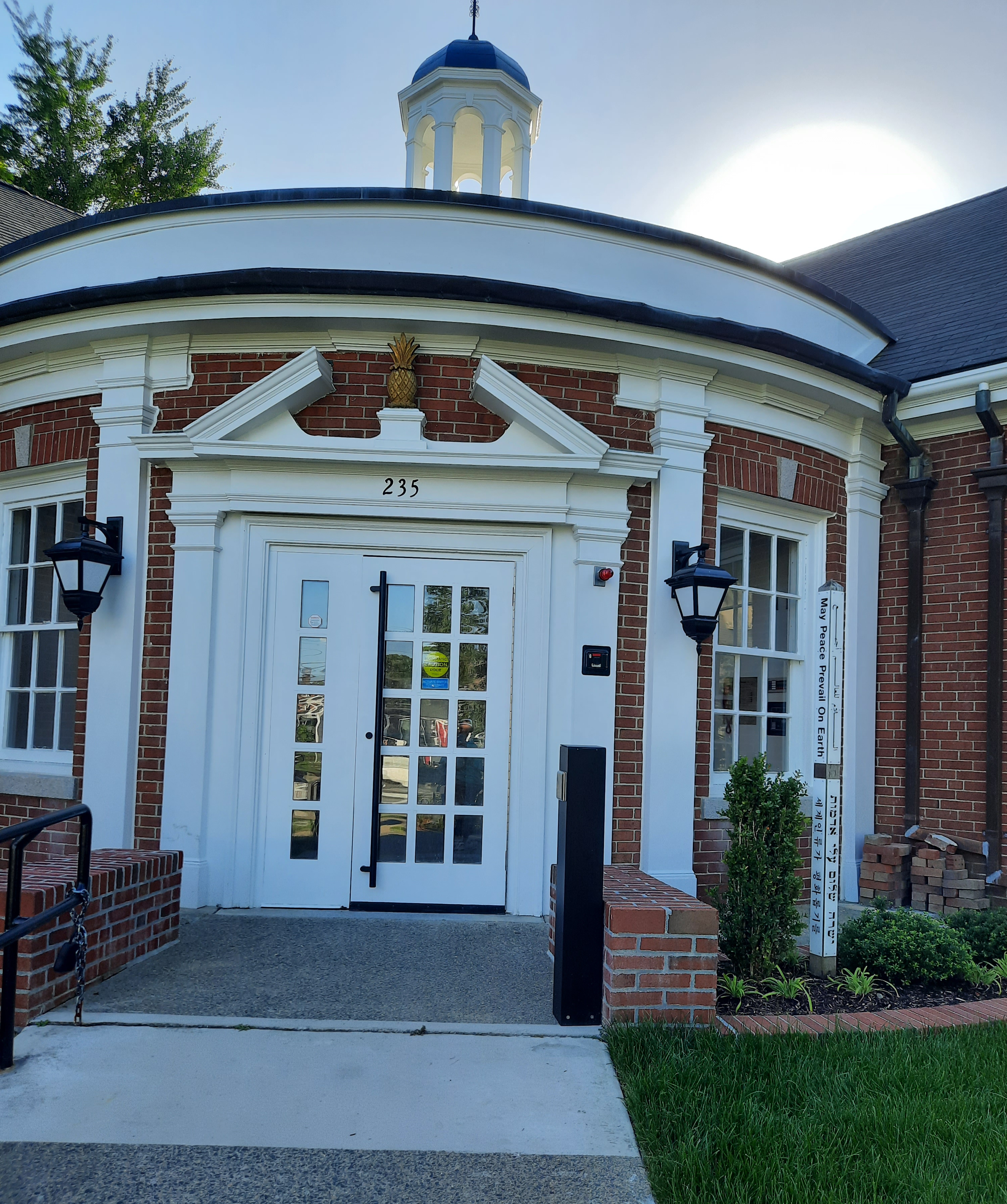
New Abbot Library July 2024

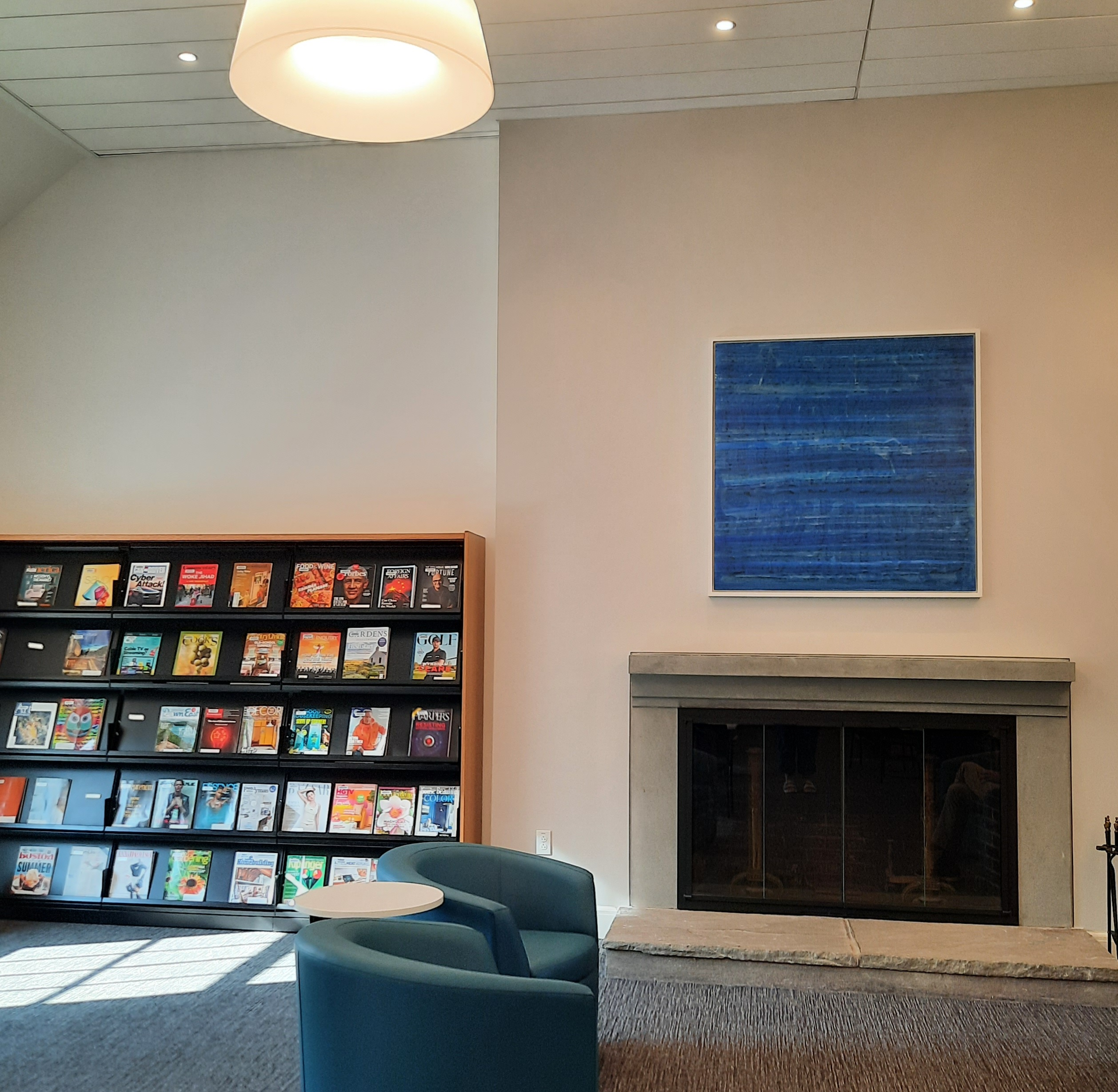
New Abbot Library Reading Room July 2024

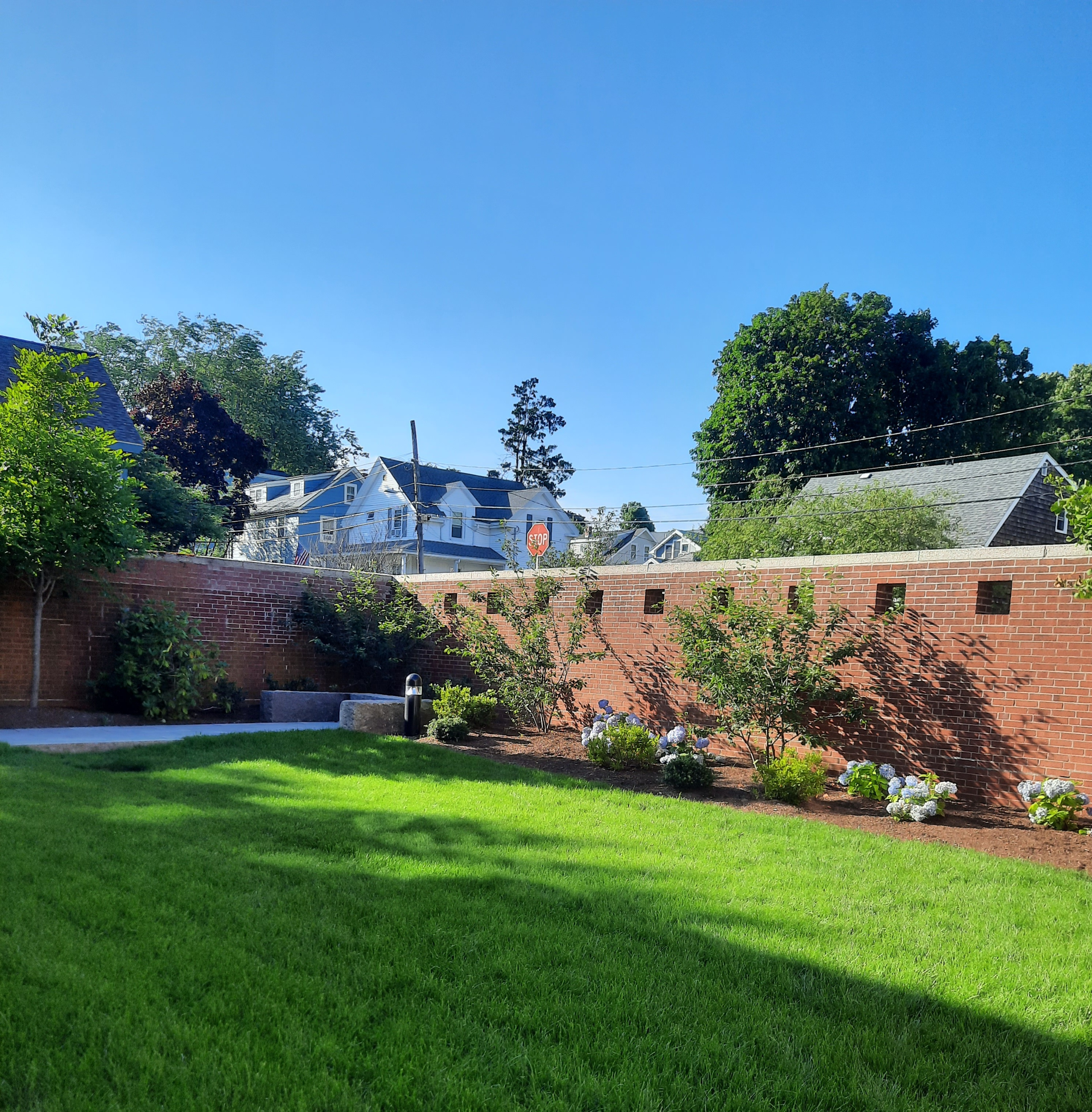
Abbot Library New Garden July 2024

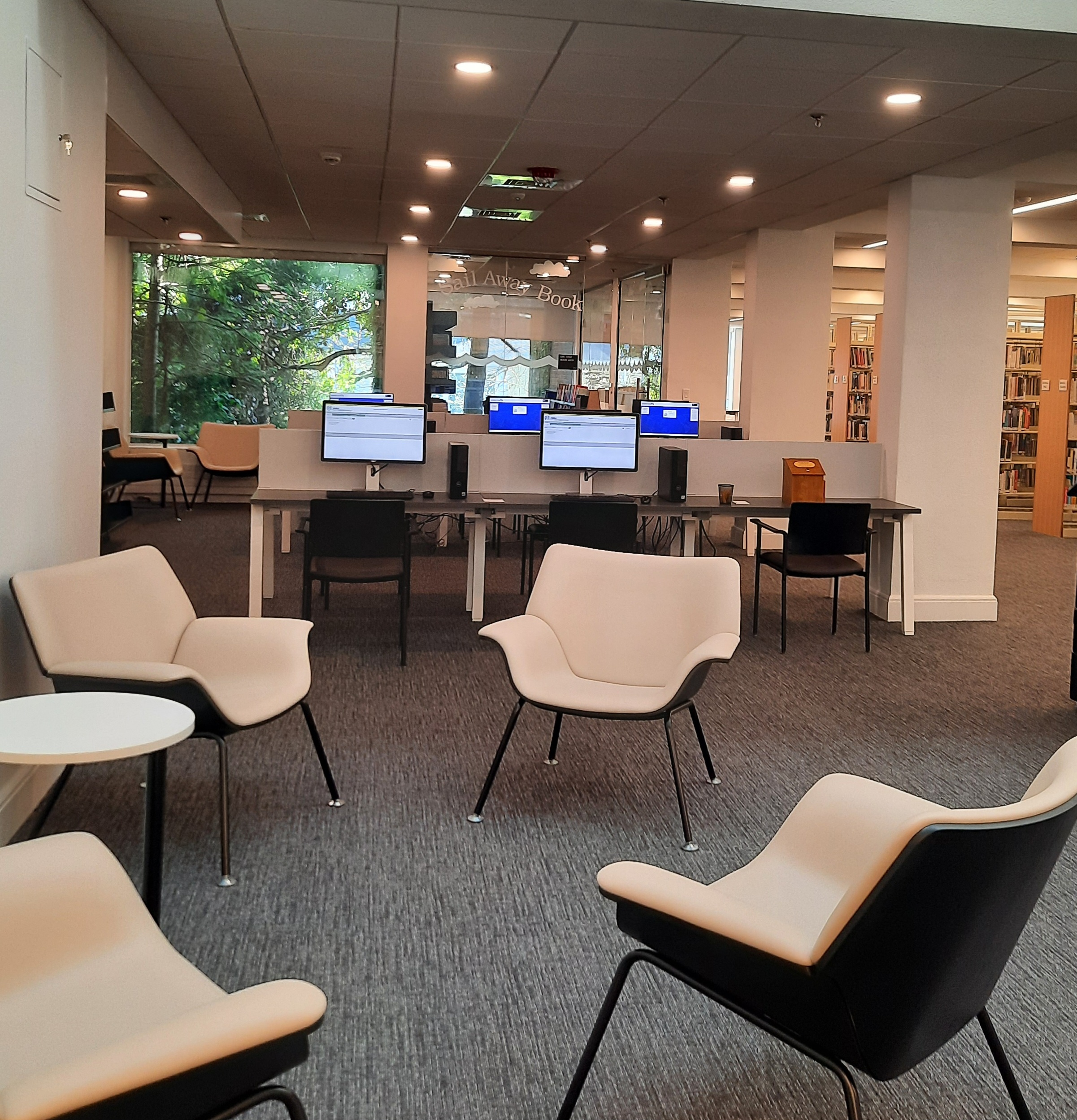
Abbot Library New Computer Area July 2024

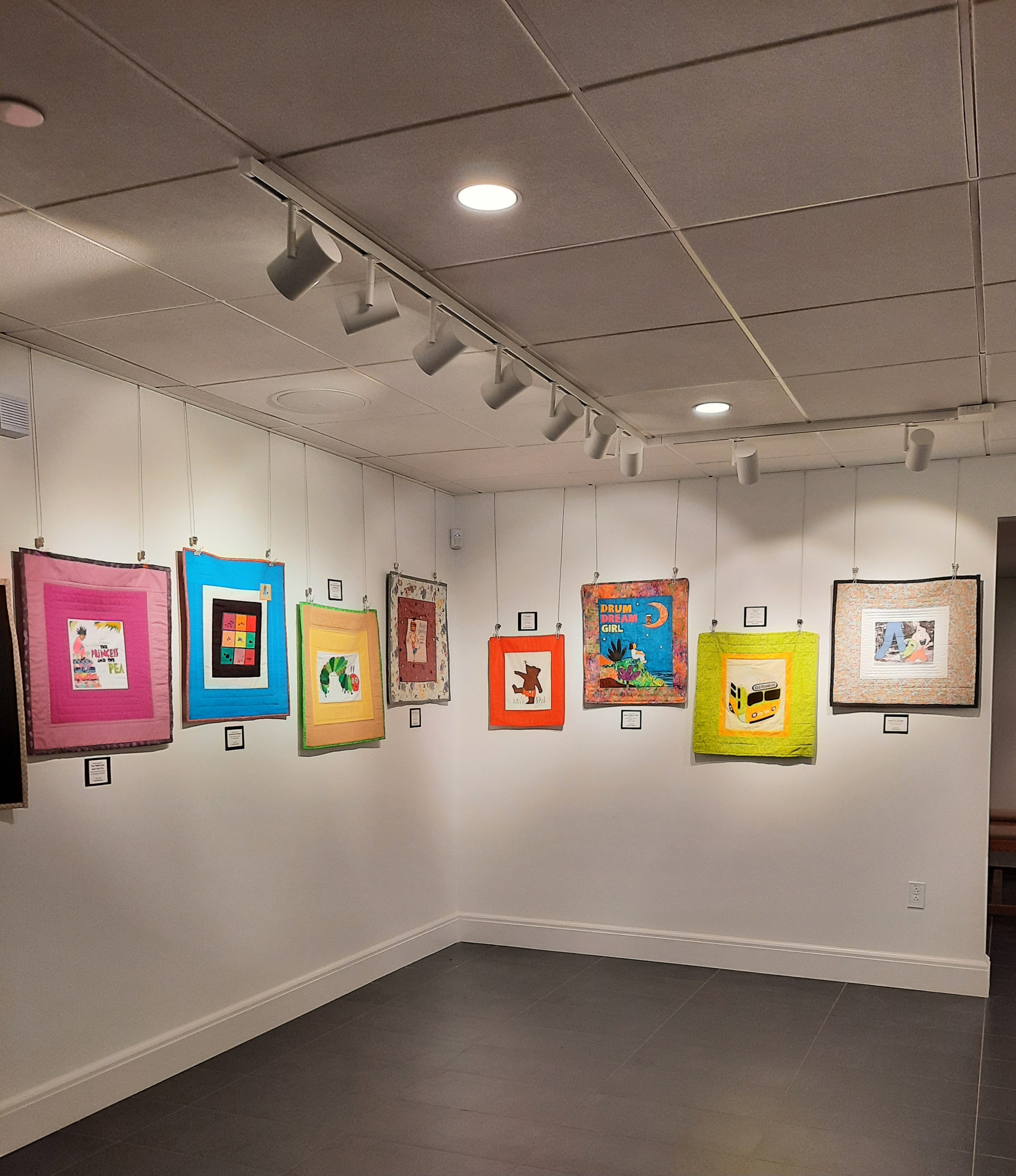
Abbot Library New Gallery July 2024

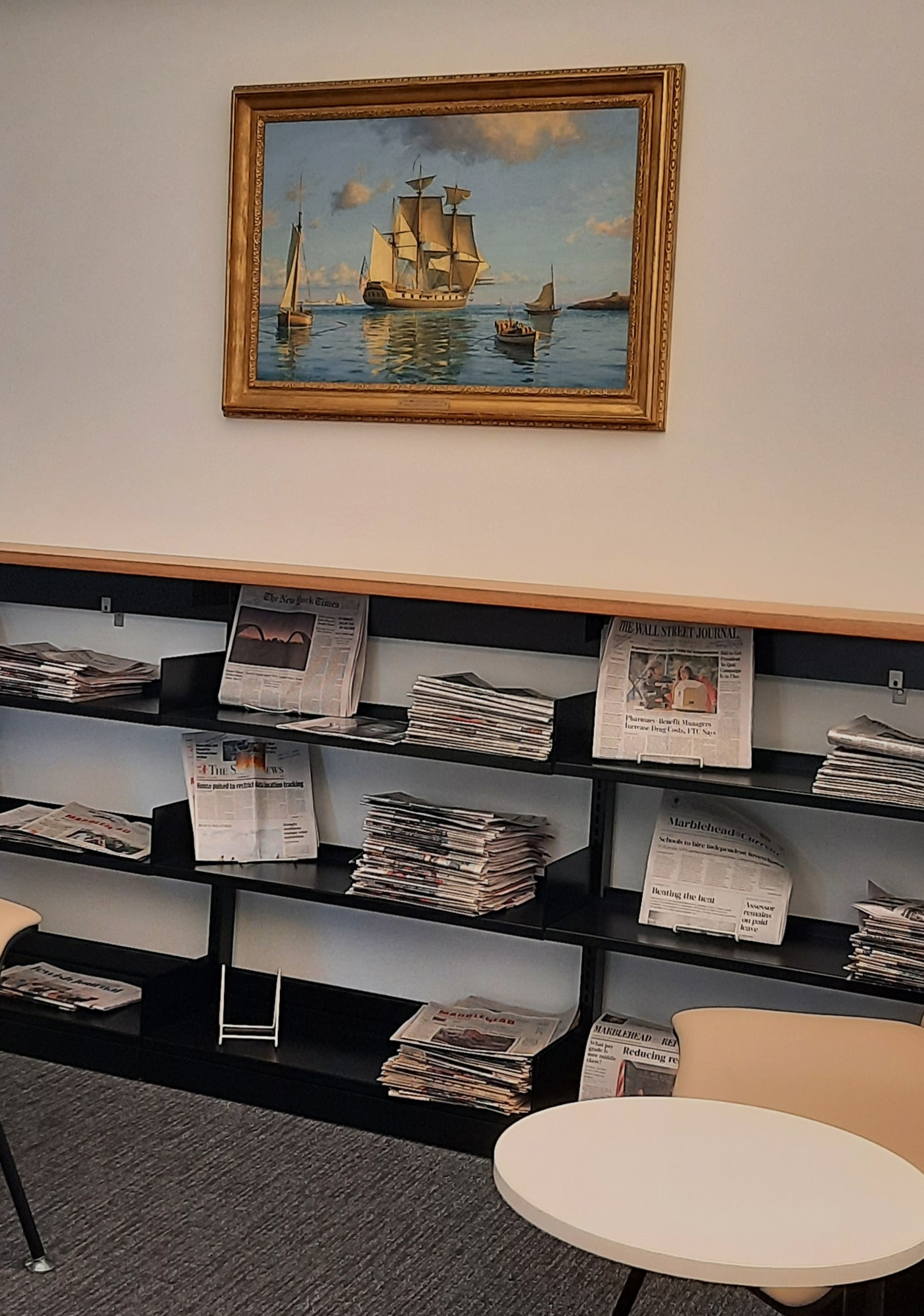
Abbot Library New Reading Area July 2024
