= Francis Buttrick Library =

- Waltham Public Library
- U.S. National Register of Historic Places
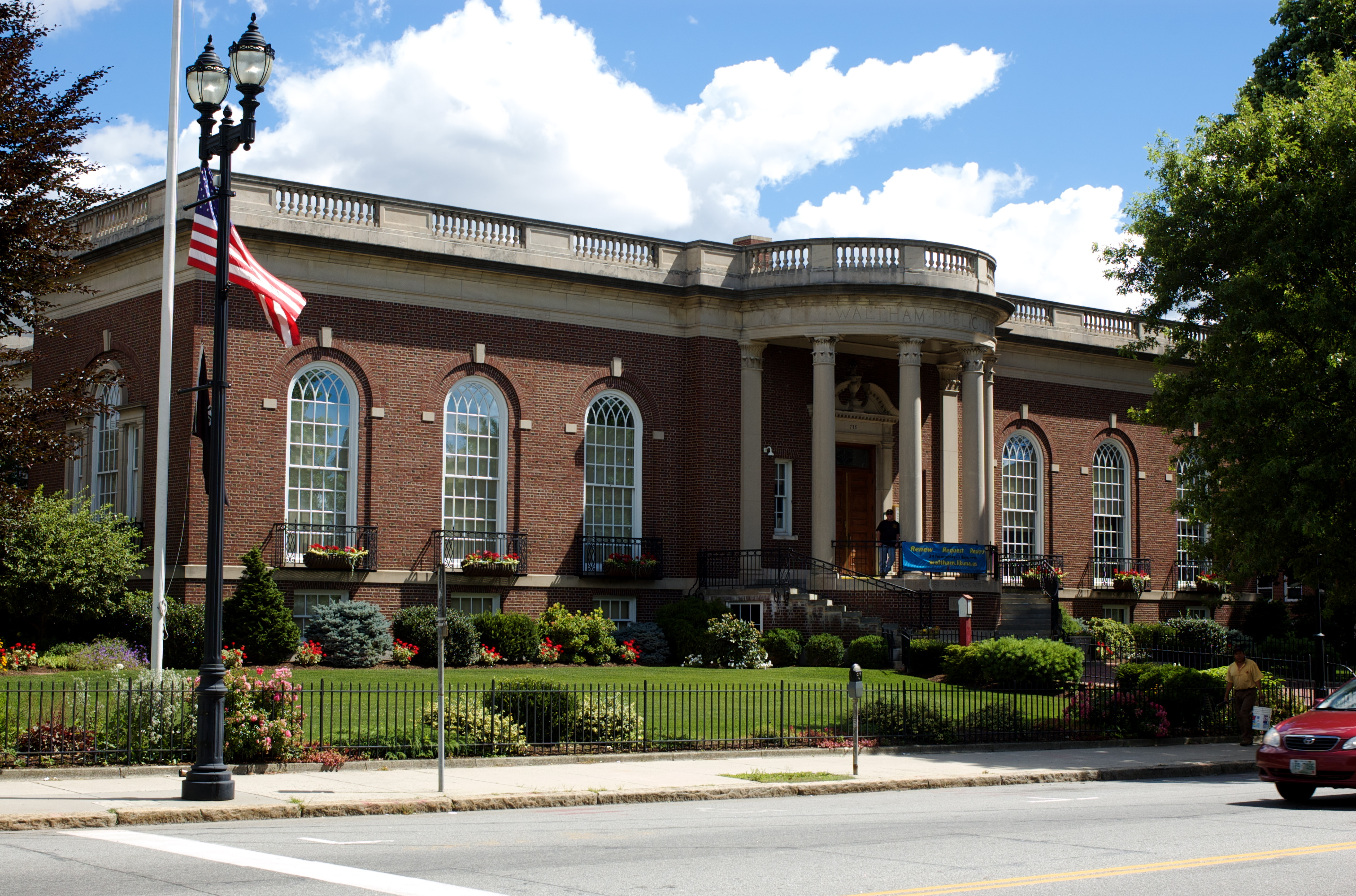

- Location within Massachusetts Location within the United States
- Location: 735 Main St., Waltham, Massachusetts
- Coordinates: 42°22′35″N 71°14′23″W
- Built: 1915
- Architect: Loring & Leland
- Architectural style: Colonial Revival
- MPS: Waltham MRA
- NRHP reference No.: 89001547
- Added to NRHP: September 28, 1989

The Waltham Public Library is the public library of the city of Waltham, Massachusetts. Its main location is in the Francis Buttrick Library, an architecturally significant Georgian Revival building built in 1915, funded by a bequest from Francis Buttrick, a major landowner in the city. The building was listed on the National Register of Historic Places in 1989.

== Architecture and history ==
The Buttrick Library building is located on the north side of Main Street, between Exchange and Spring Streets. The front portion of the building, its historic portion, is a tall single-story brick structure, with round-arch windows and a projecting semicircular entry pavilion. The building is topped by a balustrade. Additions extend the building to the rear, providing space for modern stacks and services.

The Waltham Public Library was established in 1865 with a gift of 3,700 volumes from the Rumford Institute for Mutual Instruction, an 1826 organization established by the proprietors of the Boston Manufacturing Company as a service to its employees. It grew over the rest of the 19th century by the gifts of other collections, and was at first housed in the Welch Building at Charles and Moody Streets. In 1894, Francis Buttrick, then the city's largest landowner, bequested funds for the construction of a permanent home. The oldest portion of the building was designed by the Boston firm Loring & Leland, and was completed in 1915, it having taken twenty years to locate and acquire a suitable parcel of land. A gallery space was added in 1933, and a modern addition made to the rear later in the 20th century.

== See also ==
- National Register of Historic Places listings in Waltham, Massachusetts
