= Jacob Sears Memorial Library =

- Sears Memorial Library
- U.S. National Register of Historic Places
- U.S. Historic district
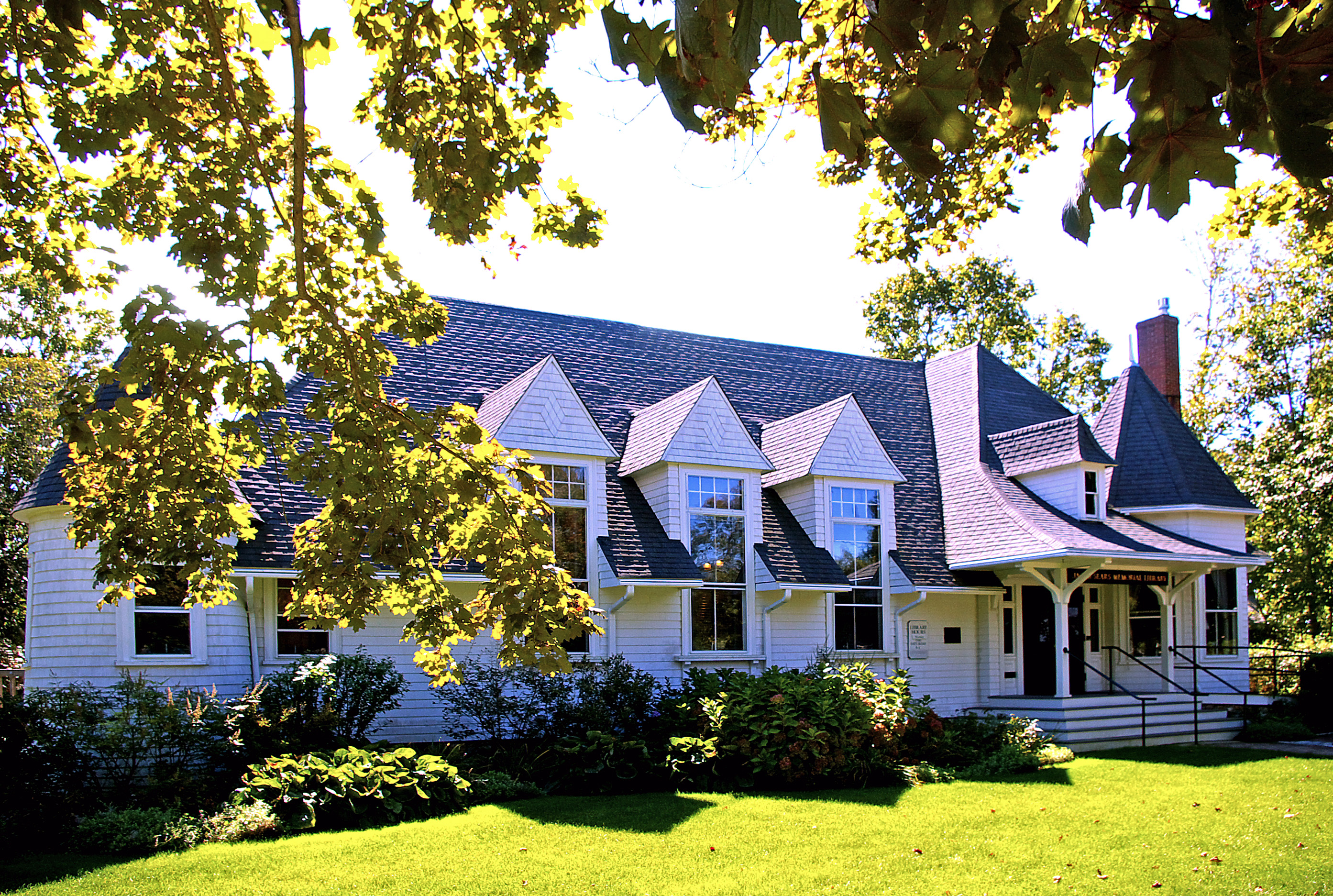
- Jacob Sears Memorial Library

- Location within Cape Cod Location within Massachusetts Location within the United States
- Location: 23 Center St., P O Box 782, East Dennis, Massachusetts
- Coordinates: 41°44′52″N 70°8′46.3″W
- Area: less than one acre
- Built by: J.M. Kellaway
- Architect: Rand & Taylor
- Architectural style: Shingle Style
- NRHP reference No.: 09000934
- Added to NRHP: November 18, 2009

The Jacob Sears Library is one of the five public libraries of Dennis, Massachusetts. It is located at 23 Center Street in East Dennis, in a building funded by a bequest from Jacob Sears, a longtime East Dennis resident. The Shingle style structure was built in 1895 to a design by the Boston firm of Rand & Taylor. The library building was listed on the National Register of Historic Places in 2009.

== Architecture and history ==
The Jacob Sears Memorial Library is set on the south side of Center Street in the village of East Dennis, just north of Massachusetts Route 6A. It is a rectangular single-story wood-frame structure, with a hip roof and a stone foundation. The ridge line of the roof is T-shaped, with the section at the right end perpendicular to the street. This section extends to shelter the main entrance, flaring out form a portico supported by square posts and large brackets. Just to the right of the entrance is a turreted polygonal projection. Wall dormers line the front facade to the left of the entrance. The interior is divided into the primary library space at the western end, a large meeting space in the center, with backstage spaces at the far eastern end.

The first library services were provided in East Dennis by a private lending association founded in 1866. Jacob Sears, a lifelong resident of East Dennis, gave funding for the construction and endowment of this library building, which was completed in 1895 to a design by the Boston firm of Rand & Taylor. The meeting hall has been used for a wide variety of civic and social functions. The building underwent a major restoration in 2005-06.

== See also ==
- National Register of Historic Places listings in Barnstable County, Massachusetts
