= Sherborn Library =

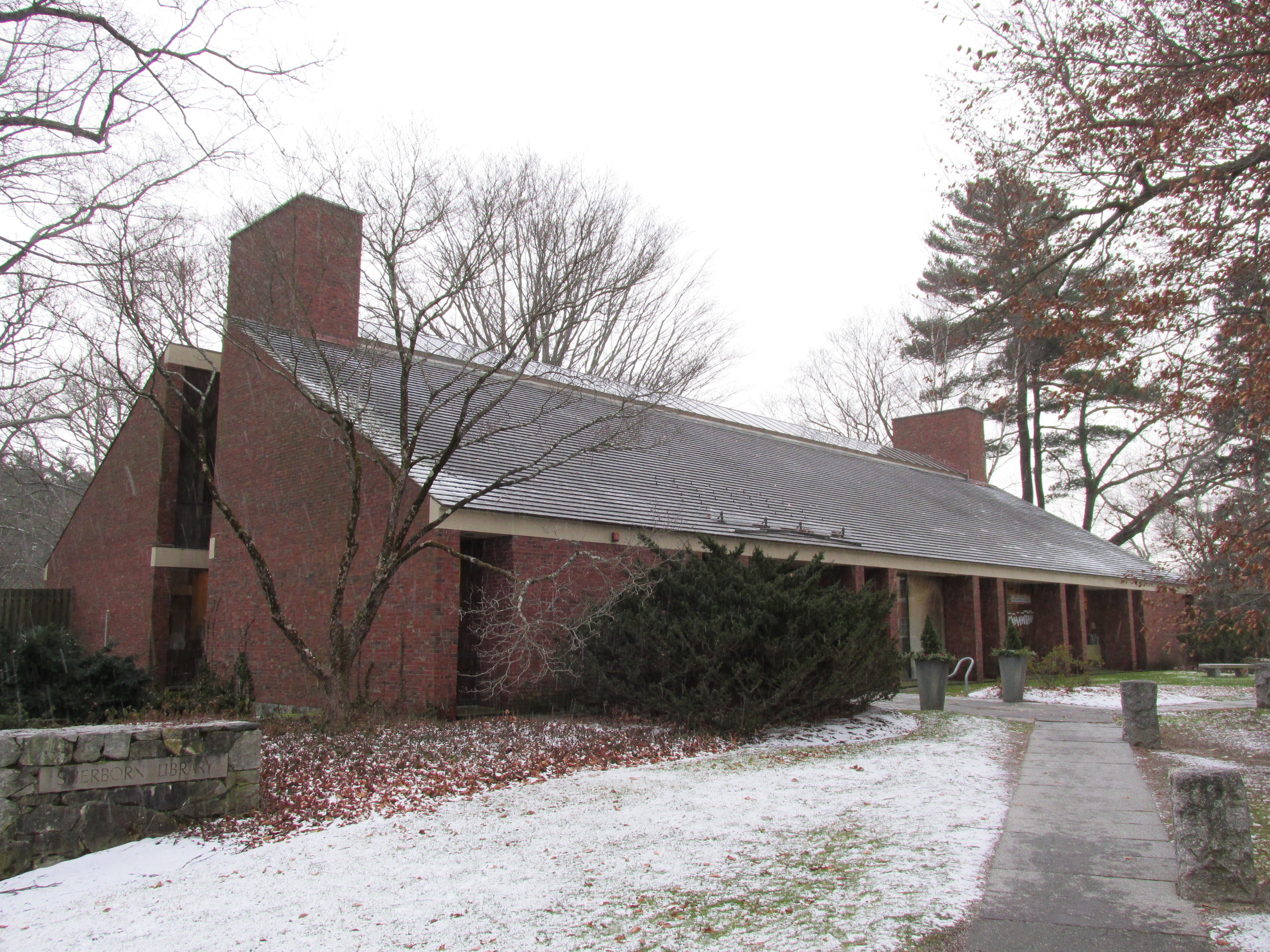
- Sherborn Library
- 42.2392°N 71.3695°W
- Location: Sherborn, Massachusetts
- Established: 1860, by Theodore Dorr

Other information
- Director: Elizabeth Johnston
- Website: library.sherbornma.org

The Sherborn Library is a municipal public library in Sherborn, Massachusetts, United States. Many libraries have existed in the town, beginning with one book collection set up by the Social Circle in 1808. Theodore Dorr combined several book collections to form one central library in 1860. In 1914, a benefactor named William Bradford Homer Dowse built a brick building that would become the Sherborn Library in January 1971. Today, the library is used frequently by the residents of Sherborn, and is open every day except Sunday.
