= Uxbridge Free Public Library =

Public library in Massachusetts

Coordinates: 42.07742°N 71.62994°W

The Uxbridge Free Public Library is the public library in Uxbridge, Massachusetts. It opened in 1875.

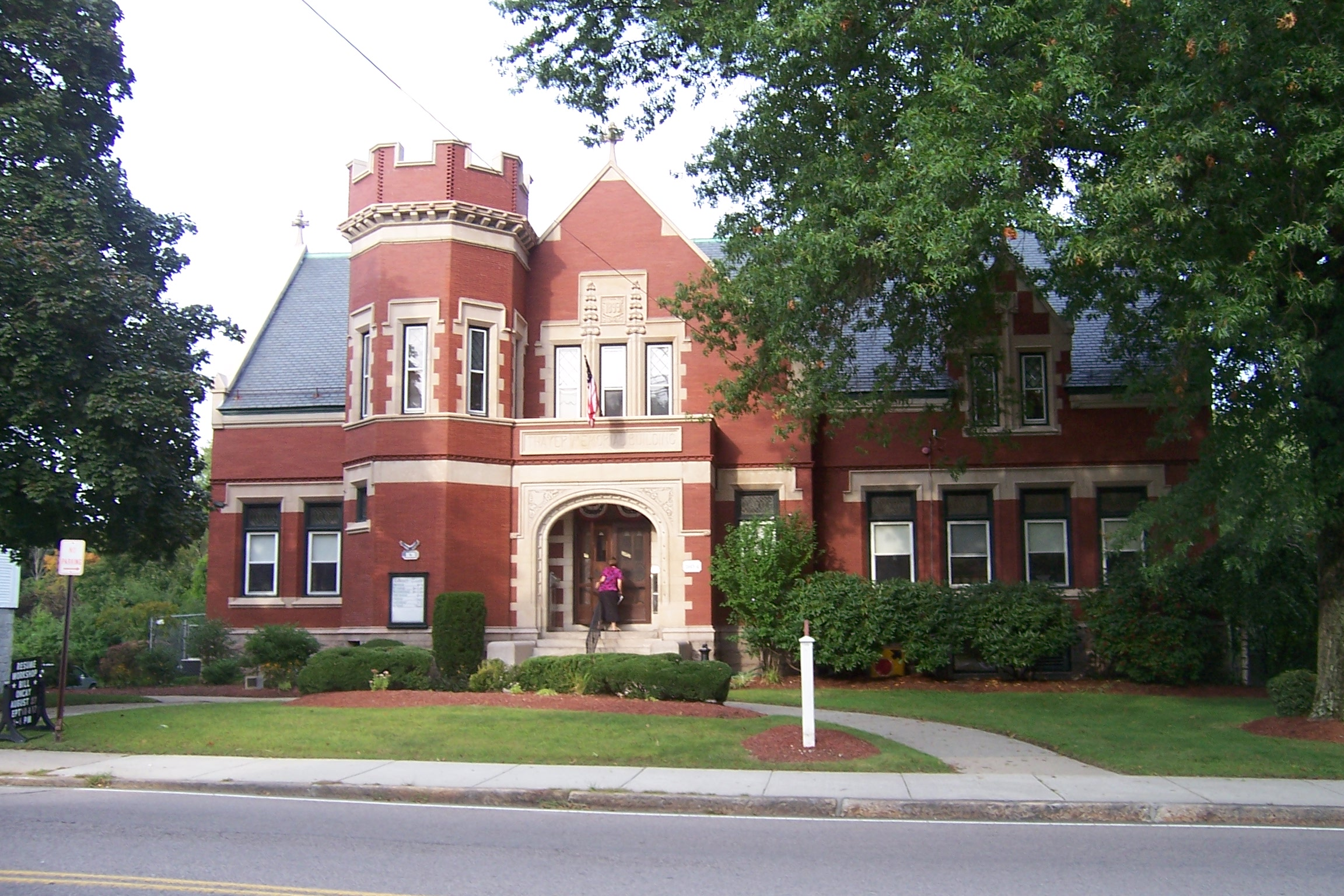
Uxbridge Free Public Library

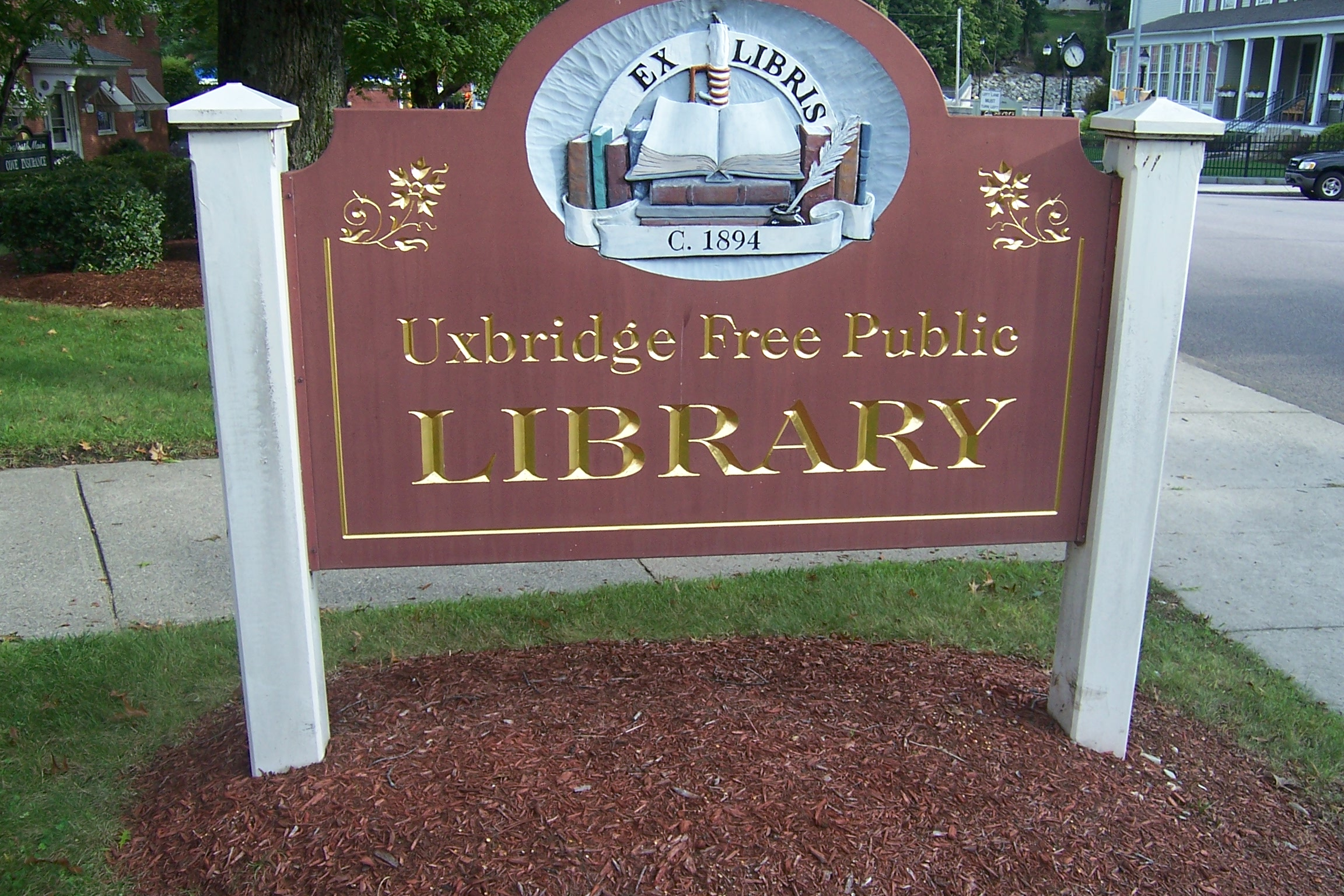
Uxbridge Free Public Library Sign

The first library in the town of Uxbridge was the Uxbridge Social and Instructive Library (1775–1812), managed by George Southwick at his store in the Quaker City section of South Uxbridge. The sixth was the Uxbridge Agricultural Society (1859–1864). Most of these small libraries were subscription libraries that required dues and assessments.

In 1874, the Uxbridge voters elected six trustees to set up a free library. They met on April 18, 1874, to organize the Uxbridge Free Public Library. It opened in the FW Barnes jewellery store on South Main Street on January 20, 1875. After five years, the free library moved into the Town Hall.

On June 20, 1894. the library's new home, the Thayer Memorial building, was dedicated. Edward Carrington Thayer, a local business man and banker, had built it and donated it to the town in memory of his parents, Joseph and Chloe Taft Thayer

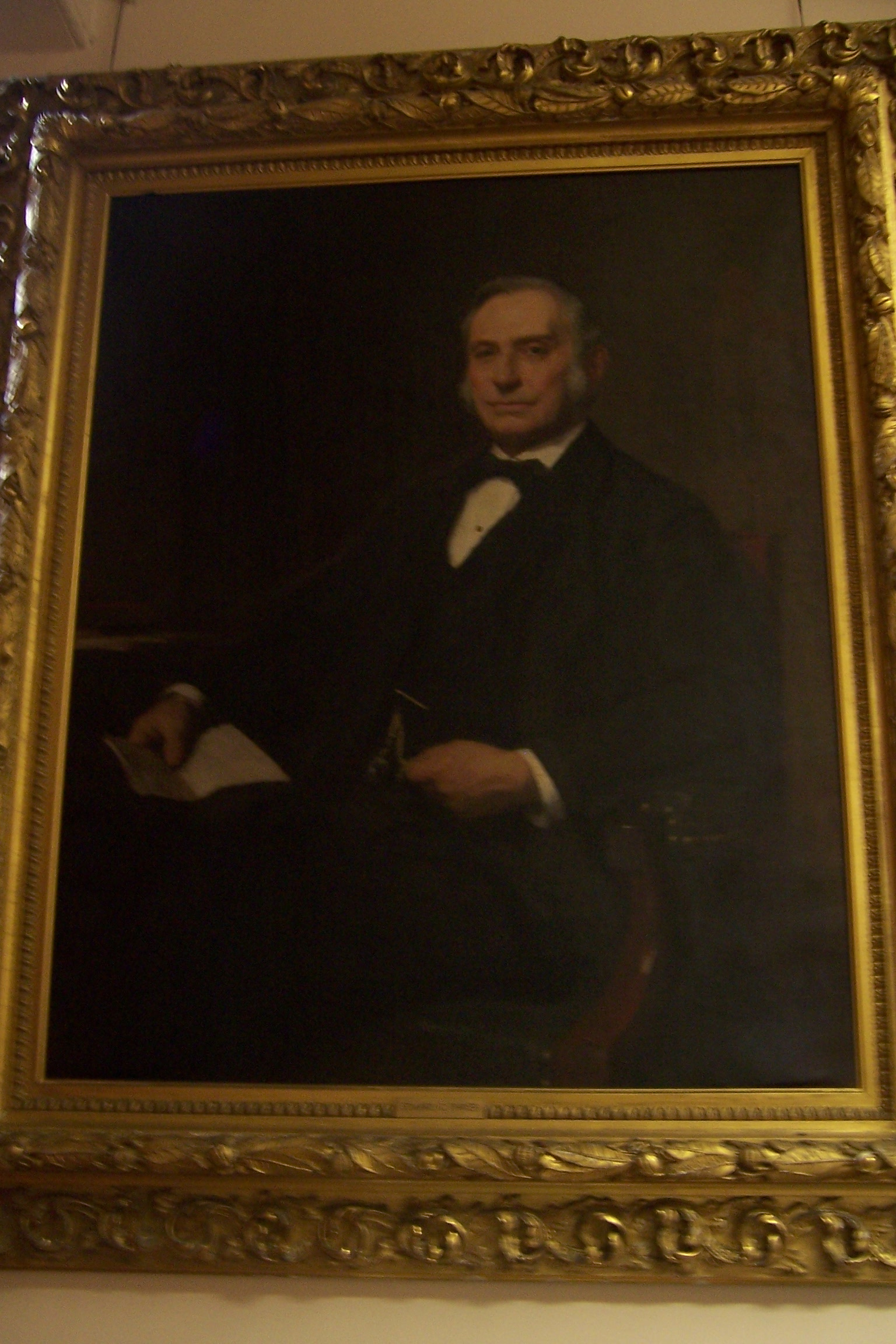
Edward Carrington Thayer

The Thayer Memorial building was designed by Fuller & Delano of Worcester as architects and the building contract to Urgel Jacques of Worcester. Thayer spent $28,000 for the building, $4,000 for the land and $1,500 for furnishings, for a total of $33,500.

The Thayer Memorial building still houses the Uxbridge Free Public Library.
