= CW MARS =

Library consortium in central and western Massachusetts, US

Central and Western Massachusetts Automated Resource Sharing, or CW MARS, is a library consortium in central and western Massachusetts dedicated to efficient resource sharing and rapid access to information. CW MARS was formed in 1982 to promote resource sharing among 28 public and academic libraries through a shared library automation system. In 1984, the network was incorporated as a 501(3)(c) not-for-profit corporation and the first member libraries began circulating on the shared system.

CW MARS is governed by its member libraries in the form of a User's Council, which approves the annual budget, establishes CW MARS policies, and elects officers to the Executive Committee. The Executive Committee works to develop and recommend policies, budget and membership. CW MARS has a professional staff for support of its integrated library system (ILS), network functions and the Digital Treasures library.

As of 2021, CW MARS has more than 150 members and 175 branch locations, including public, academic, school, and special libraries. CW MARS offers a shared online computer system and combined collections of more than nine million items.
