= Felicia Meyer =

American painter

- Felicia Meyer, Self Portrait, 1940
- Born: Felicia Meyer; May 14, 1912; New York City, US
- Died: January 11, 1978 (aged 65); Dorset, Vermont, US
- Resting place: Maple Hill Cemetery, Dorset, Vermont
- Education: The Finch School, Art Students League of New York
- Known for: Painter of landscapes and portraits
- Style: Realism
- Spouse: Reginald Marsh

Felicia Meyer (1912–1978) was an American painter known for her landscapes, city scenes, and portraits. Her style was realist. She lived part of the year in Manhattan and part in southern Vermont and her paintings depict subjects from both locales. During the 1930s and 1940s her work appeared frequently in group exhibitions and she was given solo exhibitions intermittently between 1942 and 1974. Early in her career a New York critic called her paintings "coherent" and "deeply unified," and after her death the art historian Lloyd Goodrich wrote that "her landscapes, with their sense of nature's life, their freshness and delicacy, and their unostentatious skill, were pervaded with a lyrical poetry of a very personal kind."

== Early life and education ==
In the early 1930s Meyer studied in Manhattan at The Finch School and the Art Students League. At the League her instructors were Kimon Nicolaïdes, Kenneth Hayes Miller, and Guy Pène du Bois.

== Artistic career ==
Felicia Meyer, Vermont Hillside, oil on linen, 1940, 28 1/16 × 34 1/16 inches

Felicia Meyer, Cocktails on the Terrace, oil on masonite, before 1950, 30 x 22 inches

Felicia Meyer, Still Life With Flowers, oil on canvas, 1950, 24 x 20 inches

On completing her art studies she participated in shows held in both Manhattan and Manchester, Vermont. Early in 1932 she participated in a small group exhibition held at the G.R.D. Gallery in Manhattan, (Note: The G. R. D. Gallery was a nonprofit organization that opened early in 1928. Named in honor of the artist Gladys R. Dick, its founder was the philanthropist Jean S. Roosevelt (Mrs. Philip Roosevelt) and its art director was Kimon Nicolaïdes.) That summer she contributed paintings to a large group exhibition held by the Southern Vermont Artists Association in Manchester, (Note: In August 1927 a group calling itself "Southern Vermont Artists" held an exhibition in Manchester, Vermont. Made up of painters and sculptors who were permanent or summer residents within a radius of about 50 miles of Manchester, the group limited the duration of its exhibition to two weeks, permitted artists to select the works they wished to exhibit and offer for sale, and charged no admission to the public.) (Note: A second exhibition the following year attracted the attention of Edward Alden Jewel, art critic for the New York Times, who gave it a lengthy review. Over succeeding decades the exhibition became an annual tradition and the group, having incorporated itself as Southern Vermont Artists, Inc., proved durable.) (Note: Dorset, the town where Meyer had her summer home, was known as the town where the association had its origins.) and at the end of the year her work appeared in a group exhibition at the Jumble Shop gallery. (Note: Located on 8th Street in Greenwich Village the Jumble Shop was a café that hosted informal art exhibitions. The proprietors, Frances E. Russell and Winifred J. Tucker, had opened the place as an antiques shop in the early 1920s. After they turned it into a tea room, it became an artists' hangout, with men such as Guy Pène du Bois and Reginald Marsh, selecting paintings to be shown in exhibitions that changed every month or so.) In the succeeding years of the 1930s Meyer regularly contributed paintings to exhibitions in Manhattan and Manchester. (Note: News accounts of her participation in the annual exhibitions held by Southern Vermont artists appear regularly from 1932 to 1938 and her work appeared in group shows held at the Passedoit Gallery (1936), the Municipal Galleries (1936), and the Jumble Shop (1937, 1938).) Early in 1935 she showed at a gallery run by the National Association of Women Artists in a group of former League students that included Dean Fausett, Horace Day, Fairfield Porter, and Elizabeth Nottingham (Note: The exhibition, which was held at the association's galleries in the Squibb Building, consisted mainly of landscapes. In addition to those named, the group included Yvonne Pène du Bois, James L. Montague, Lloyd Goff, Harriette de Sanchez, Clinton King, William Taylor, Leslie Crawford, Frances Avery, and Stuart Eldredge.) and later that year showed again in the annual exhibition held by Southern Vermont artists.

During the 1940s, critics rarely noticed her paintings in group shows, (Note: She was mentioned as a participant in the Whitney Annual of 1941, and only a few others.) but she received attention for solo exhibitions in 1942 (at the Wakefield Gallery) and 1944 (at the Macbeth Gallery). In 1957, 1969, and 1974 her paintings appeared in solo shows at the Frank K.M. Rehn Gallery.

Over the course of her career Meyer came to be known best for her landscapes of the Vermont locale where she spent the summer months. Her 1940 painting, "Vermont Hillside," (shown at left) is typical of these landscapes. She was also known for depictions of the New York locale where she spent the cooler months. Her painting, "Cocktails on the Terrace" (shown at right) is typical of these. She was also known for her floral still lifes, such as the one shown at left and figure studies, such as the self portrait shown at right.

== Artistic practice ==
Meyer usually painted in oil on canvas.

== Personal life ==
Meyer was an only child, daughter of the artists Herbert William Meyer and Anne Norton Meyer. In 1934 she married the artist Reginald Marsh. The couple had no children.
