= Audrey Buller =

Canadian artist

Audrey Buller (1902–1984) was a Canadian artist who created hyperrealist oil paintings.

== Career ==
Buller was born in Montreal, Quebec, and in 1923 moved to New York and enrolled at the Art Students League, studying still life with Henry Schnakenberg and figure drawing with Kenneth Hayes Miller. By 1929, Buller was exhibiting in New York. Her first solo show was in 1933. By the late 1930s, she had exhibited at the Art Institute of Chicago, the National Academy of Design and the Whitney Museum of American Art. The Museum of Modern Art included her work in the exhibition, Americans 1943: Realists and Magic-Realists in 1943. A retrospective was held at the O’Kane Gallery at the University of Houston-Downtown in 2007.

Her work is included in the collections of the Whitney, the National Gallery of Canada and the Metropolitan Museum of Art.
