= Lynn Common Historic District =

Historic district in Massachusetts, United States

- U.S. National Register of Historic Places
- U.S. Historic district
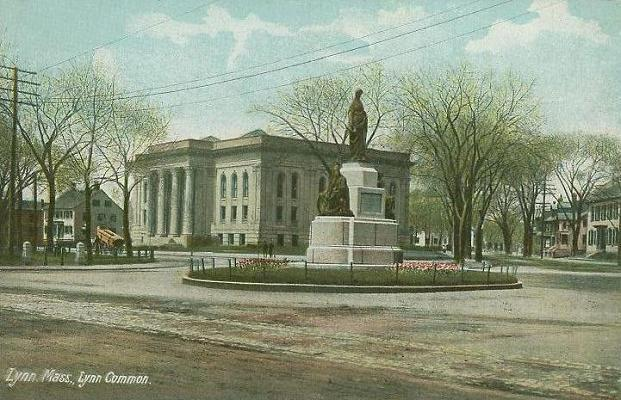
- Lynn Common

- Location within Massachusetts Location within the United States
- Location: Lynn, Massachusetts
- Coordinates: 42°27′49″N 70°57′28″W
- Built: 1637
- Architect: Multiple
- Architectural style: Mid 19th Century Revival, Late 19th And 20th Century Revivals, Late Victorian
- NRHP reference No.: 92000247
- Added to NRHP: April 10, 1992

The Lynn Common Historic District encompasses the town common of Lynn, Massachusetts and the surrounding buildings which face it. Although its establishment dates to the late 17th century, the area's time of development is predominantly in the 19th century, when the common was transformed into a park. The common is an elongated grassy area, flanked by North and South Common Streets, with a number of small cross streets breaking it into several pieces. City Hall Square marks its eastern boundary, and Market Square its western.

Many of the buildings facing the common are residential and relatively unaltered since their construction in the 19th century. Stylistically they are in a variety of forms from Federalist to Colonial Revival, with Queen Anne houses outnumbering other styles. There are four Colonial Revival apartment houses (built between 1900 and 1920) along North Common Street.

A number of Lynn's significant civic and religious buildings lie within the district. The main library building is separately listed on the National Register, as are the armory, and St. Stephen's Memorial Episcopal Church. The Lynn Memorial City Hall and Auditorium building lies just off the common to the east.

The district was added to the National Register of Historic Places in 1992.

== See also ==
- National Register of Historic Places listings in Lynn, Massachusetts
- National Register of Historic Places listings in Essex County, Massachusetts
