= St. Stephen's Memorial Episcopal Church =

Historic church in Massachusetts, United States

- St. Stephen's Memorial Church
- U.S. National Register of Historic Places
- U.S. Historic district – Contributing property
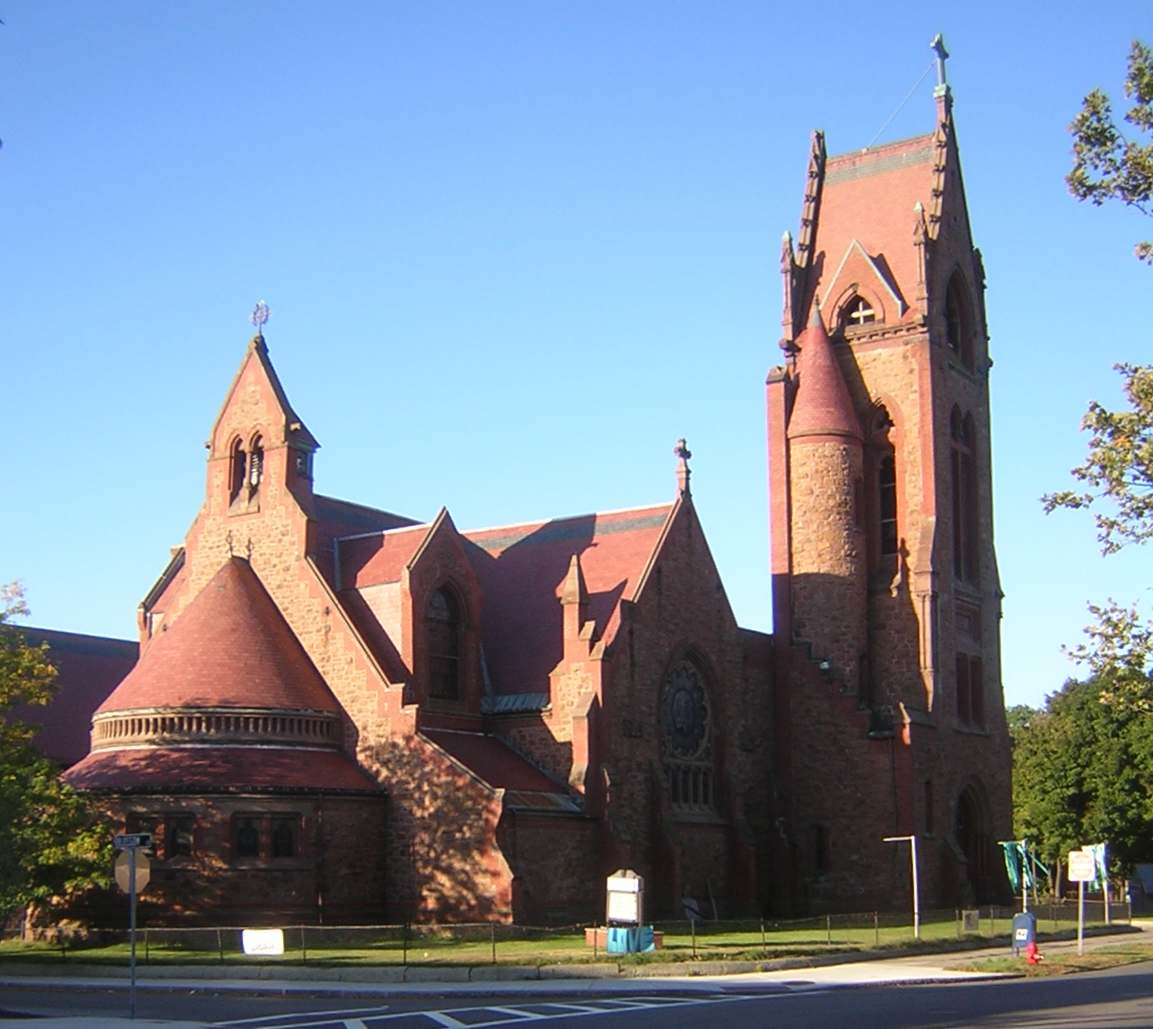

- Location within Massachusetts Location within the United States
- Location: Lynn, Massachusetts
- Coordinates: 42°27′47″N 70°57′23″W
- Built: 1881
- Architect: Ware & Van Brunt; Evans & Tombs
- Architectural style: Gothic, Romanesque
- Part of: Lynn Common Historic District (ID92000247)
- NRHP reference No.: 79000335

Significant dates
- Added to NRHP: September 7, 1979
- Designated CP: April 10, 1992

St. Stephen's Memorial Episcopal Church is parish of the Episcopal Diocese of Massachusetts in Lynn, Massachusetts founded in 1844. It is noted for its historic church at 74 South Common Street.

The church reported 400 members in 2018 and 370 members in 2023; no membership statistics were reported in 2024 parochial reports. Plate and pledge income reported for the congregation in 2024 was $137,219 with average Sunday attendance (ASA) of 43 persons.

Completed in 1881, the church is of a Romanesque Revival design by Ware & Van Brunt. It was built as a memorial to the children of Enoch Reddington Mudge of Swampscott, member of a leading Lynn family. It was built of granite quarried from Mudge's Swampscott estate, and trimmed with red brick and stone. The interior is richly decorated, with parquet and mosaic floors, carved timber ends, and a number of stained glass windows.

The church was listed on the National Register of Historic Places as St. Stephen's Memorial Church on September 7, 1979, and included in the Lynn Common Historic District in 1992.

== Gallery ==
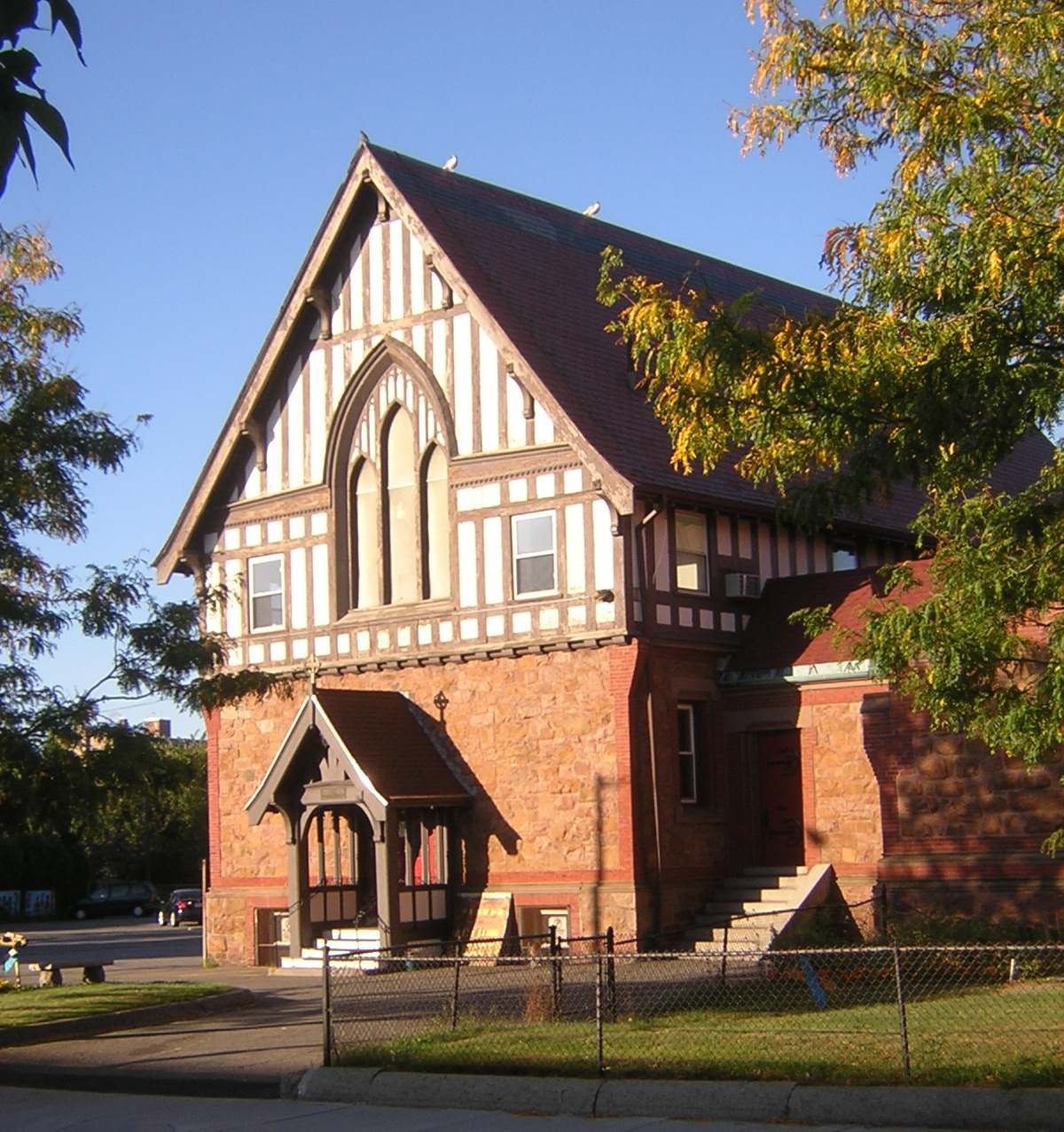
Parish house

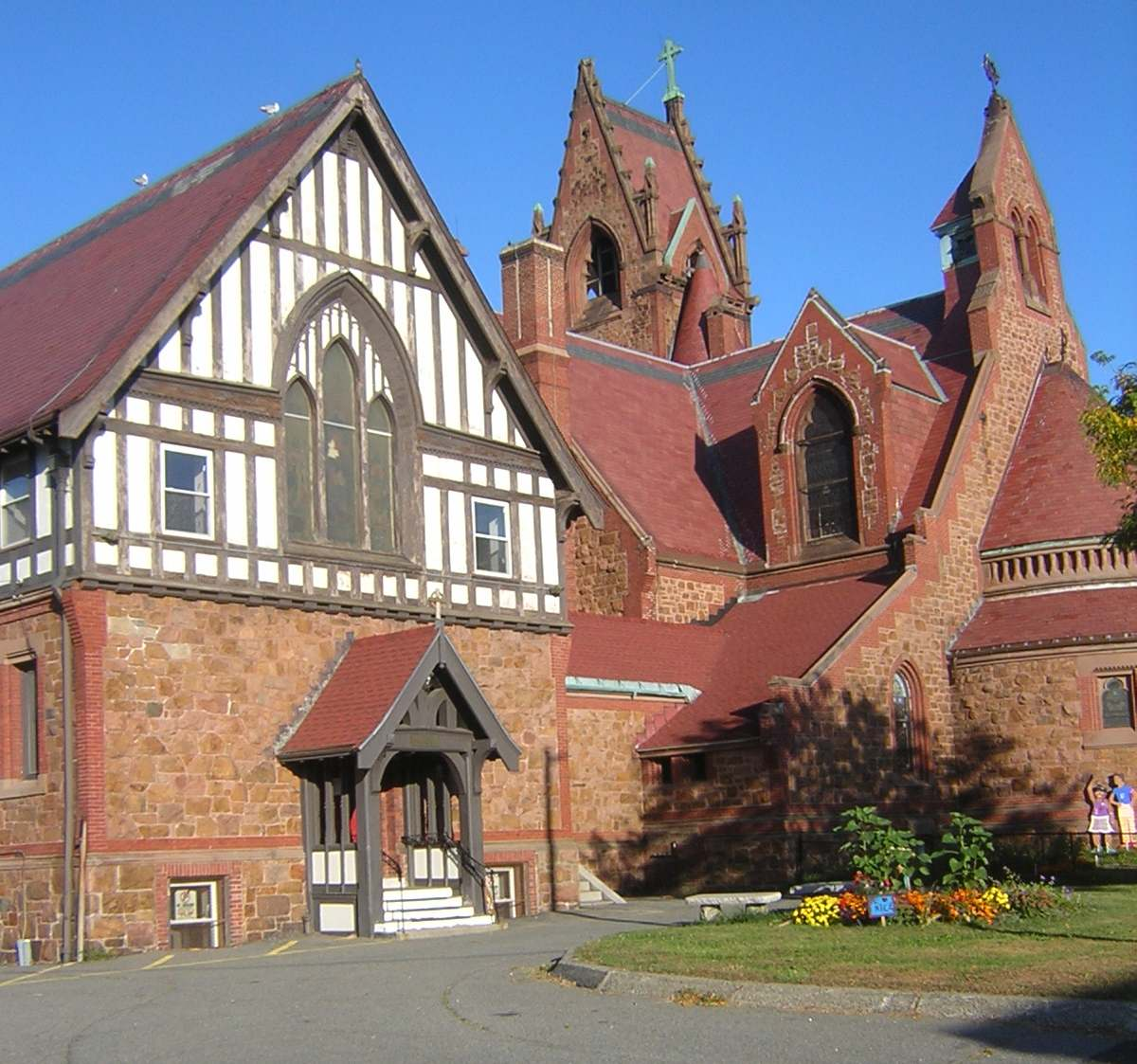
Rooflines

== See also ==
- National Register of Historic Places listings in Lynn, Massachusetts
- National Register of Historic Places listings in Essex County, Massachusetts
