= Lynn Public Library =

Library in Lynn, Massachusetts

- U.S. National Register of Historic Places
- U.S. Historic district – Contributing property
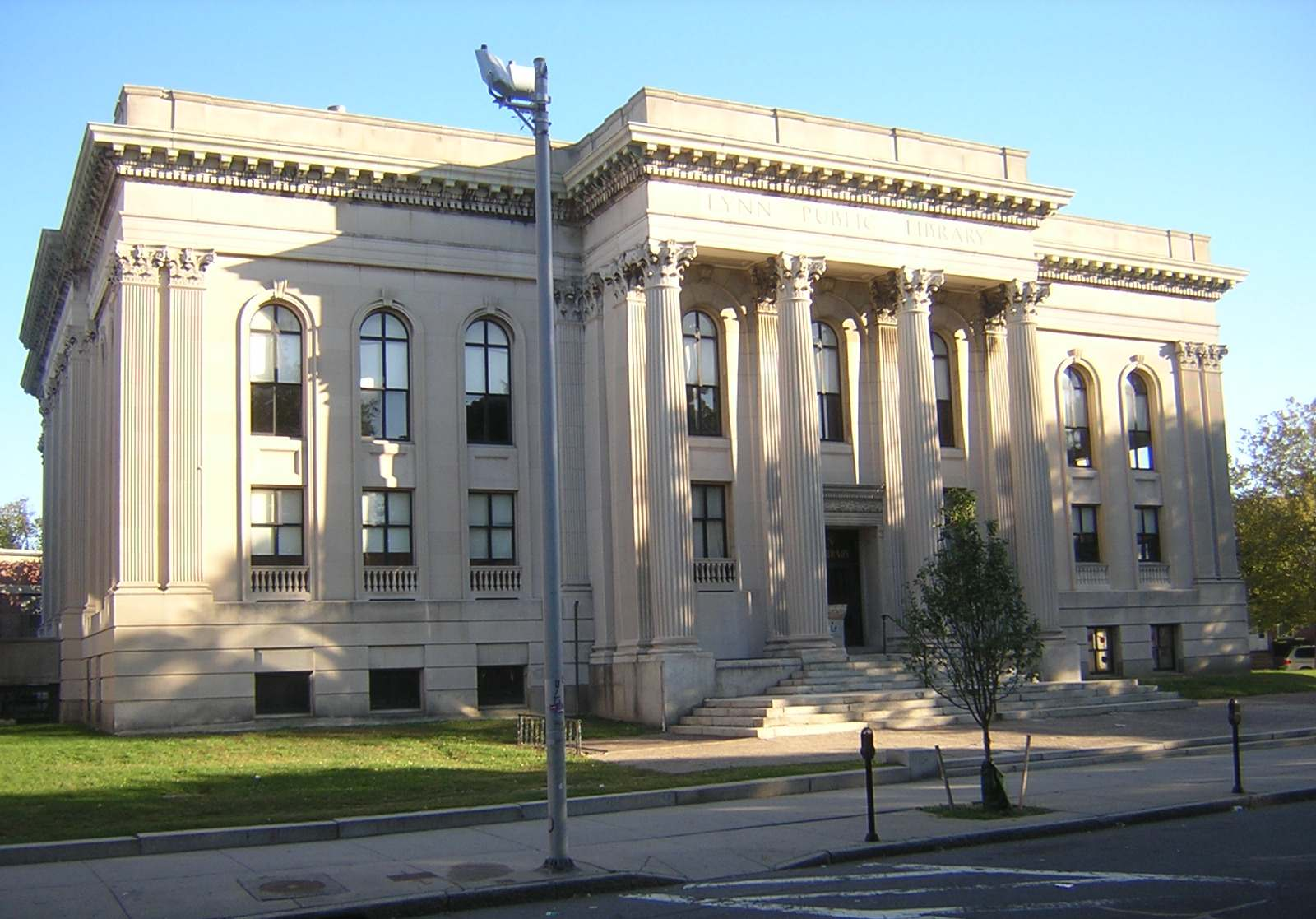
- South side

- Location within Massachusetts Location within the United States
- Location: Lynn, Massachusetts
- Coordinates: 42°27′52″N 70°57′13″W
- Built: 1898
- Architects: Moore, George A.
- Architectural style: Renaissance
- Part of: Lynn Common Historic District (ID92000247)
- NRHP reference No.: 79000334

Significant dates
- Added to NRHP: August 21, 1979
- Designated CP: April 10, 1992

The Lynn Public Library building is a historic library at Five North Common Street in Lynn, Massachusetts. Although library services were offered in Lynn as early 1815, it was not until a bequest in 1896 that the city began planning a permanent home for the growing collection. After some controversy, library trustees chose a Renaissance Revival design by local architect George A. Moore, who happened to be related to one of the library trustees. Controversy also attended the size and scale of the building, along with the removal of trees at its site on the town common. It was completed at a cost of $175,000, which included no public funding.

Construction of the library began in 1898 and it was opened in 1900. In 1900 the library commissioned the first mural of F. Luis Mora, a prominent Hispanic American artist. The library was added to the National Register of Historic Places in 1979, and included in the Lynn Common Historic District in 1992.

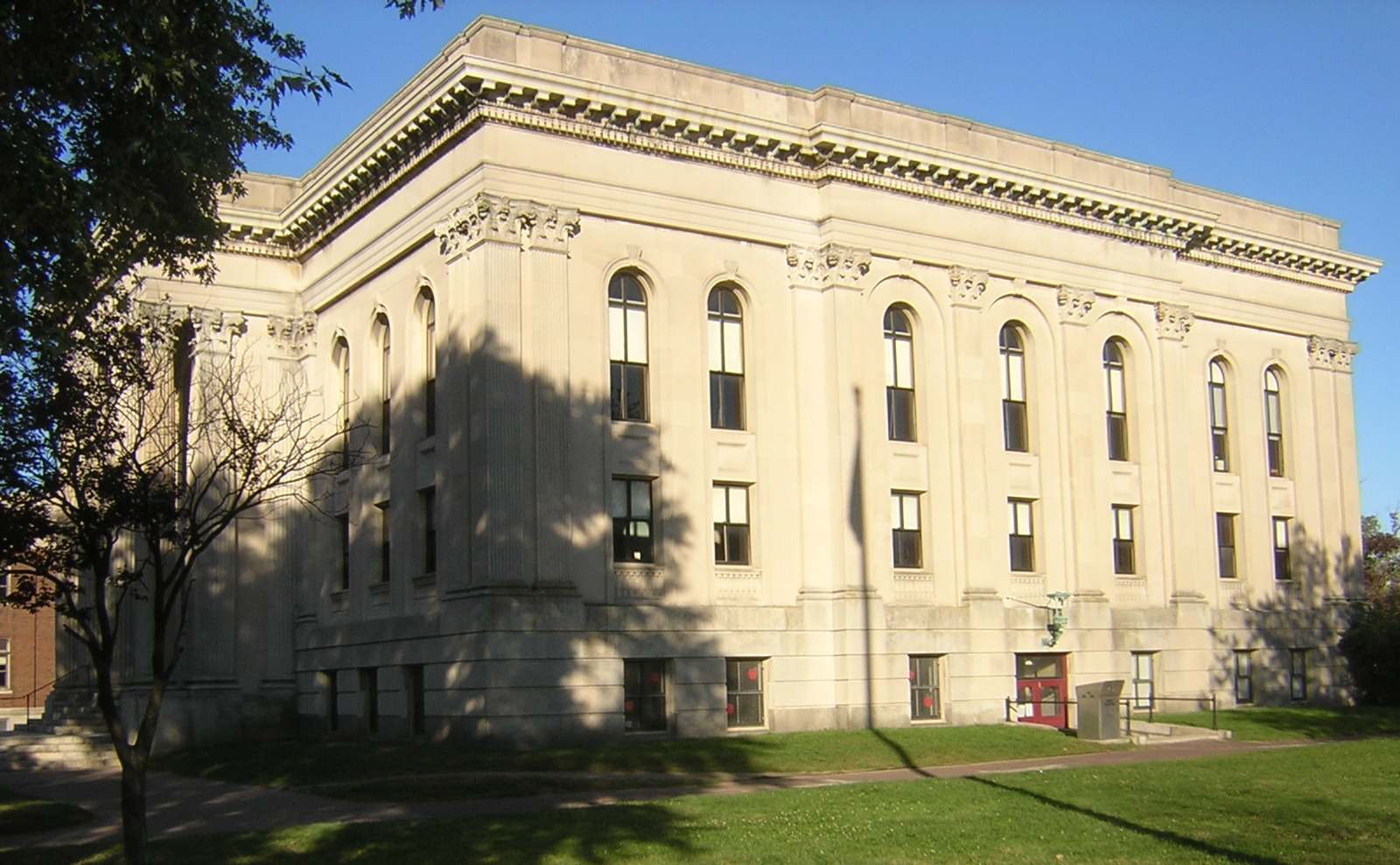
East side

== See also ==
- National Register of Historic Places listings in Lynn, Massachusetts
- National Register of Historic Places listings in Essex County, Massachusetts
