= Dorothy Eaton =

American painter (1893–1968)

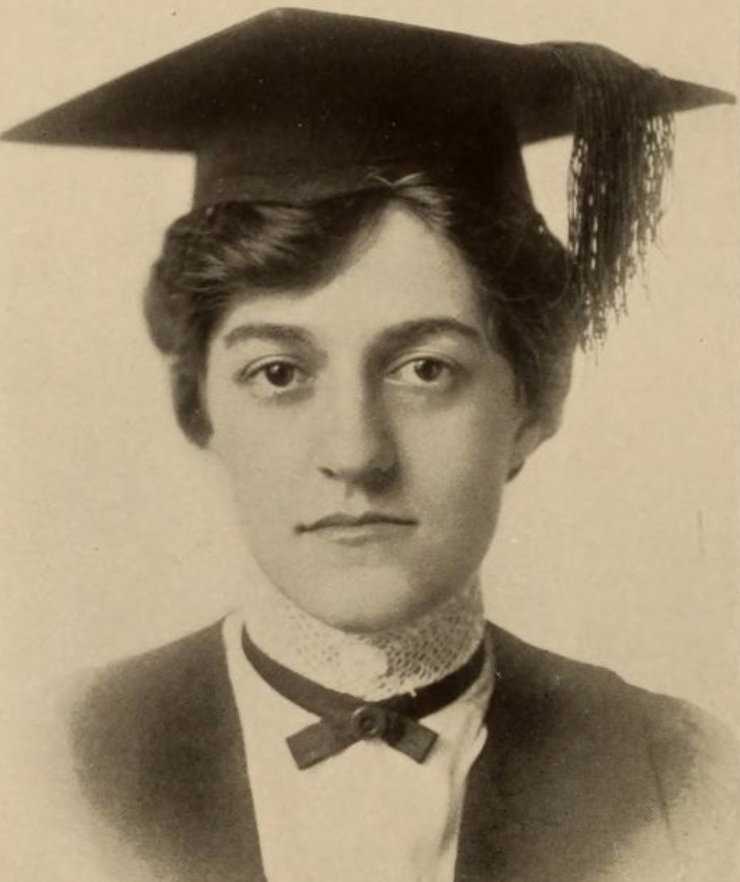
- Dorothy Eaton, from the 1916 yearbook of Smith College
- Born: May 5, 1893; East Orange, New Jersey
- Died: December 1968 (aged 75); Chatham, New Jersey
- Occupation: Artist

Dorothy Eaton (May 5, 1893 – December 1968) was an American visual artist best known for rural subjects in a style that merged nineteenth-century regional folk art with mid-century American realism.

== Biography ==
Eaton was born in East Orange, New Jersey. She attended Smith College, Columbia University and the Art Students League of New York. For most of her life, she resided in Petersham, Massachusetts, but was a major presence in the art scene in New York City during the 1930s and 40s. She died in 1968 in Chatham, New Jersey, at the age of 75.

== Artistic career ==
Eaton studied at the Art Students League of New York. The school had no entrance requirements and no set curriculum; it developed a reputation for progressive methods and radical politics. Around 1900, the Art Students League became increasingly relevant in the training of female artists. Among Eaton's teachers were Boardman Robinson and Kenneth Hayes Miller; with the latter, she studied mural painting for several years. Her expertise became oil paintings. She produced scenes of rural life, portraits, and floral still life paintings. Some of her rural motifs she found in Petersham and environs.

Eaton showed her first work of art in 1929 in an exhibit hosted by the Salons of America (founded in 1922). She exhibited mostly in New York City at the Montross Gallery, Grant Studios, the Municipal Art Gallery, and Argent Gallery. Her painting Summer Flowers was included in the 44th Annual Exhibition at the Art Institute of Chicago in 1931. In 1936, Eaton had her first solo exhibition at the Montross Gallery on Fifth Avenue.

She regularly contributed to the annual show of the New York Society of Women Artists. Founded in 1925, the Society sought to support female artists in a male-dominated profession. In 1946, the New York Times art critic Edward Alden Jewell describes the sentiment of this group as “modern,” although their shows did not feature anything “that could be called really radical.” Some of the works in the immediate postwar period might “have looked rather extreme back in the Twenties, but the modern idiom has been pushed forward to greatly advanced frontiers since then.”

Both Jewell and Howard Devree, the New York Times’ other critic on the city’s art beat, regularly reported on shows by women artists, not mincing their words when they found the works inadequate. Eaton usually received at least a kind mention or a few lines, but never an image of her work. Still, Edward Alden Jewell’s snippets of art criticism accompanied her through the 1930s and 40s. In 1932, he mentioned her for the first time and thought her “brush, though possibly somewhat too exuberant, contrives a welcome mood of gayety.” Still struggling with the concept of women artists, Jewell referred to Eaton's first solo exhibition at the Montross as her “first one-man show.” He credited her for “a delightful sense of color” and her compositions as displaying “crispness and originality.” He found a “kind of fresh ‘lift’ in her work.” Betraying his own struggles with abstract modernism, he also thought her “an artist who is not manifestly floundering in a sea of theories, with no hint of rescue.”

In the Brooklyn Daily Eagle in 1936, critic Charles Z. Offin noted Eaton's show of new painting at the Montross Gallery, saying: “She is extremely tight in her brushwork and prodigious with her detail, yet her canvases have mood and life. And a style of a sort. Of her larger canvases 'Mill Town' is the most fully realized, and she also excels in two small landscape themes in which there is an effective atmospheric envelopment.”

One of her paintings, Poppy, was sponsored by the Federal Art Project (FAP). The FAP was one of the Depression-era work-relief programs of the Federal Works Progress Administration (WPA). The program was founded in August 1935 to provide employment for artists and to implement visual arts programs in local communities across the country. Artists on the WPA/FAP payroll received a basic wage of $23.50 per week and were expected to turn in one work within a specified time frame. As an easel painter, Eaton would have worked from home.

In 1941 and 1944, Eaton's works won prizes at the National Association of Women Artists exhibition. Her painting Country Auction won first prize (oil paintings) in 1944. The prize money of $200 was not insignificant in its day, translating to almost $3,000 today. Art critic Jewell found the painting “ambitious” in its depiction of so many figures, thinking that “individual figures are sometimes left static and suspended.”

Towards the end of her life, Eaton was represented by the Robert Schoelkopf Gallery on 825 Madison Avenue in New York City. A year after her death, in 1969, Schoelkopf mounted a last solo show of Eaton's works.
