= Congregational Library & Archives =

- 42°21′28.96″N 71°3′44.76″W
- Location: Boston, MA, United States
- Type: Private
- Scope: Congregational History
- Established: 1853
- Branches: 1

Collection
- Size: 250,000+

Access and use
- Access requirements: Open to the Public

Other information
- Director: Dr. Kyle Roberts
- Employees: 8
- Website: congregationallibrary.org
- Congregational House
- U.S. Historic district – Contributing property
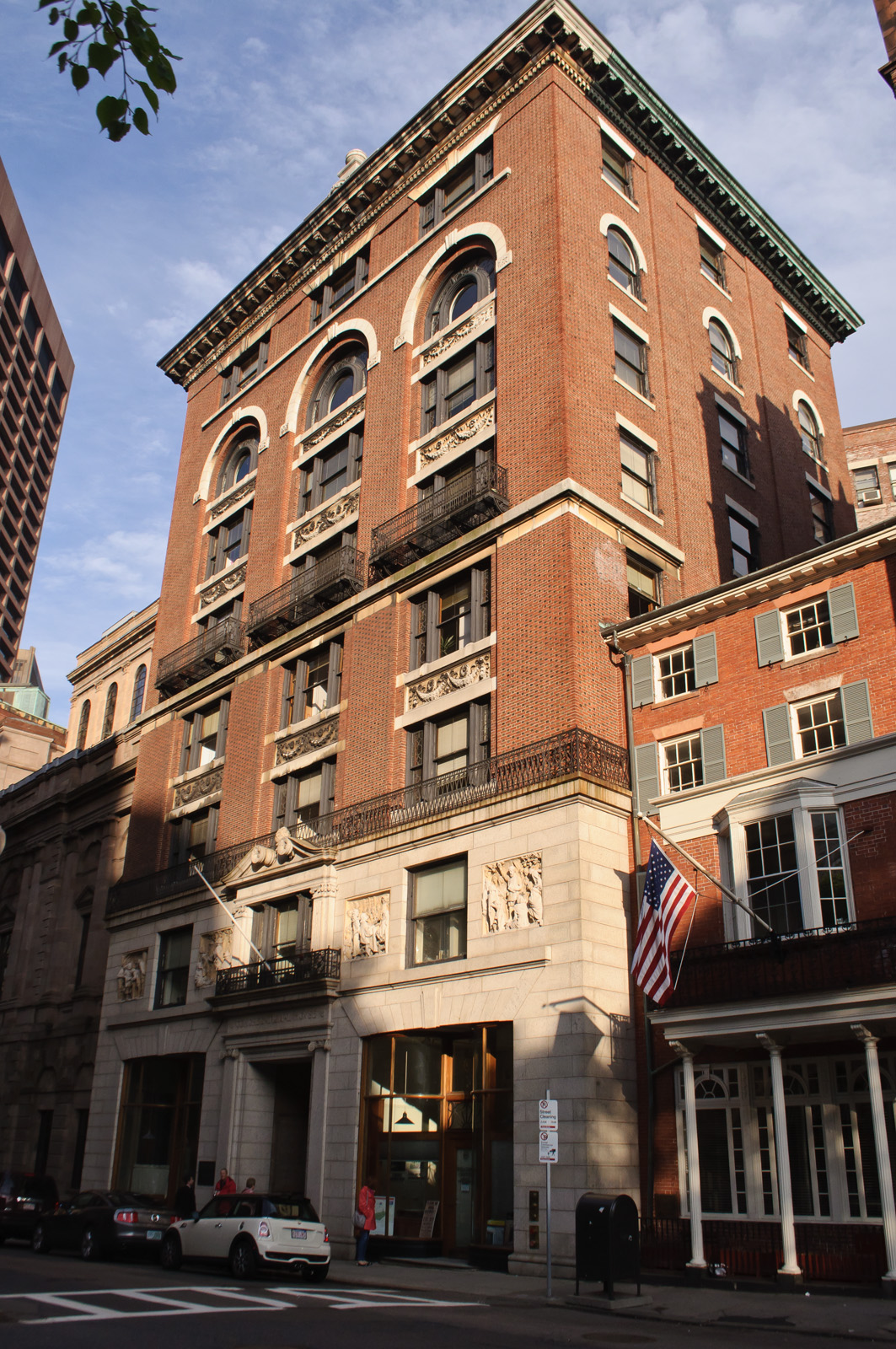
- The Congregational House, home to the Congregational Library & Archives, designed by Shepley, Rutan and Coolidge with bas-relief carvings by Domingo Mora.
- Location: 14 Beacon Street, Boston, Massachusetts
- Built: 1898
- Architect: Shepley, Rutan and Coolidge
- Architectural style: Georgian-Federal Revival
- Part of: Park Street Historic District (ID74000390)
- Added to NRHP: May 1, 1974

The Congregational Library & Archives is an independent special collections library and archives. It is located on the second floor of the Congregational House at 14 Beacon Street in the Beacon Hill neighborhood of Boston, Massachusetts. The Library was founded in 1853 by a gathering of Congregational ministers and has since evolved into a professional library and archives that holds more than 250,000 items, predominantly focused on 18th to 21st century American Congregational history. The Library's reading room is free and open to the public for research but the Library's stacks are closed and book borrowing privileges are extended exclusively to members.

== History ==
=== The American Congregational Association ===
The Library was organized on May 25, 1853 by a gathering of Congregational ministers who donated a total of 56 books and pamphlets from their own personal collections. The Congregational Library Association was formally established in 1854 in Boston, Massachusetts "...for the purpose of establishing and perpetuating a library of religious history and literature of New England." The Association occupied a room in Tremont Temple until 1857, when the growing collection was moved to Chauncy Street.

In 1864, the Congregational Library Association was authorized by the Governor of Massachusetts to change its name to the American Congregational Association as well as "do such acts as may promote the interests of Congregational Churches by publishing works, by furnishing libraries and pecuniary aid to parishes, churches, and cooperation among Congregational ministers and churches with other denominations by collecting and disbursing funds for the above objects."

By 1866, the Library contained 3,638 bound volumes and approximately 20,000 pamphlets and found their current location was too small to accommodate the Library. The Association sold said property to Jordan, Marsh, & Co. By this point, the Library's collection grew significantly, up to 15,000 bound volumes and 50,000 pamphlets The Library was then temporarily housed at 40 Winter Street until, in 1873, the Old Congregational House, at the corner of Beacon and Somerset Streets, was dedicated.

After 20 years of occupying the old Congregational House, the Association posed the question if a more permanent location should be found. In 1898, it was decided that the old Congregational House would be sold and the lots of 12 and 14 Beacon Street would be purchased and built upon. Ground was broken for the Congregational House July 28, 1897 and the corner stone was laid on November 29, 1897.

The Library was to occupy the second floor of the Congregational House, with the reading room two stories high, with 1,000 reference books available, and with the ceiling decorated by the Tiffany Glass and Decorating Company, and the stacks holding a capacity of 125,00 bound volumes.

=== Congregational House ===
The Congregational House, located at 14 Beacon Street, is an eight-story brick building completed in 1898. The building was constructed, according to its explanatory plaque to house the Library and "...provide housing for Congregational societies and other religious charitable organizations."

"The object of this Association shall be to secure the erection (and maintenance) in the city of Boston, of a Congregational House for the meetings of the body, the accommodation of its library, and for the furtherance of its general purposes; to found and perpetuate a library of books, pamphlets, and manuscripts, and a collection of portraits and relics of the past; and to do whatever else -- within limits of its charter -- shall serve to illustrated Congregational History, and promote the general interest of the Congregational Churches."

Occupants at the time of founding include the American Board of Commissioners for Foreign Missions, the Woman's Board of Missions, the Woman's Home Missionary Association, the Massachusetts Home Missionary Society, the National Council, the Congregational Educational Society, the American Missionary Association, the Seaman's Friend Society, the Boston City Mission Society, the Sunday School and Publishing Society, the Congregationalist, and Thomas Todd's Printing Establishment.

In 1957, the United Church of Christ was founded after merging the Evangelical and Reformed Church and the Congregational Christian Churches together. The UCC moved its headquarters from the Congregational House to The Interchurch Center in New York City by 1961, and many church groups and Congregational organizations found space outside of 14 Beacon Street. This led the Congregational House to become home to a wide range of advocacy groups and nonprofits.

In the summer of 2017, the American Congregational Association sold the Congregational House to Faros Properties for $25.4 million, citing the need to prioritize the mission of the organization over continuing to steward a large office building. The Library signed a lease for its current space for up to 100 years.

==== Architecture ====
The building was designed by the Boston-based architecture firm Shepley, Rutan and Coolidge, now Shepley Bulfinch, in a Georgian-Federal revival style and built by the Norcoss Brothers. The building was added to the Park Street Historic District in the National Register of Historic Places on May 1, 1974, citing the historic significance of the architecture of the area and the importance of the Congregational House and Library as a place "...to protect the original Puritan literature."

==== Bas-Reliefs ====
During design and construction the Building Committee of the American Congregational Association agreed on a series of four bas-reliefs should be included in the second story facade of the Congregational house, with each relief depicting a fundamental principle of Congregationalism. The tablets are carved from Knoxville marble and bear no inscription as it was assumed the subject of each panel would be known on sight to the average citizen. The reliefs were carved by Domingo Mora, a Spanish sculptor who, catalyzed by the Spanish–American War, left the country and reliefs unfinished, citing his inability to stay and work in a country hostile to his own. The reliefs were carefully completed according to Mora's design by a Swiss modeler known only as Mr. Stadler.

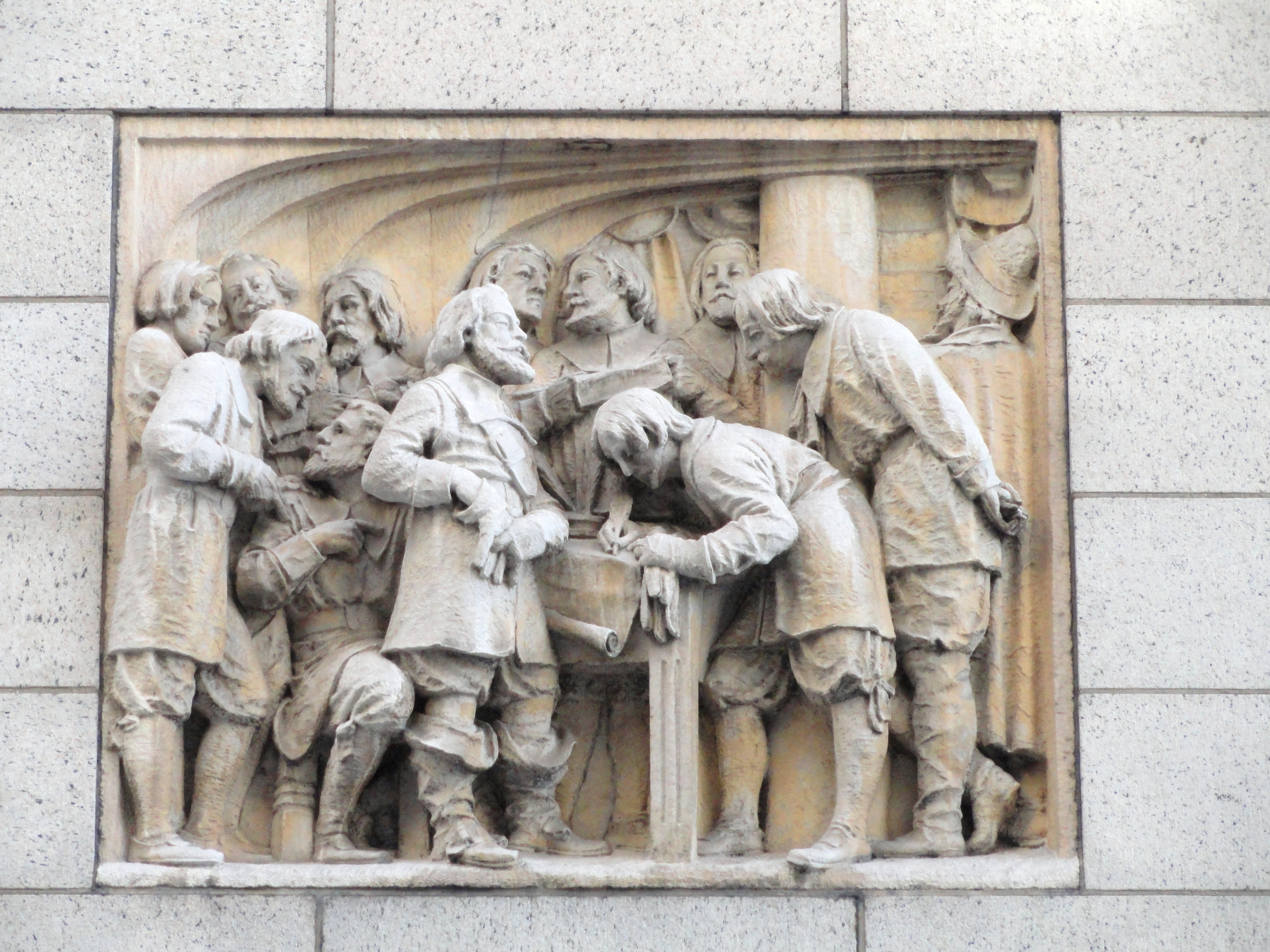
The Signing of the Mayflower Compact on the 21st of November, 1620

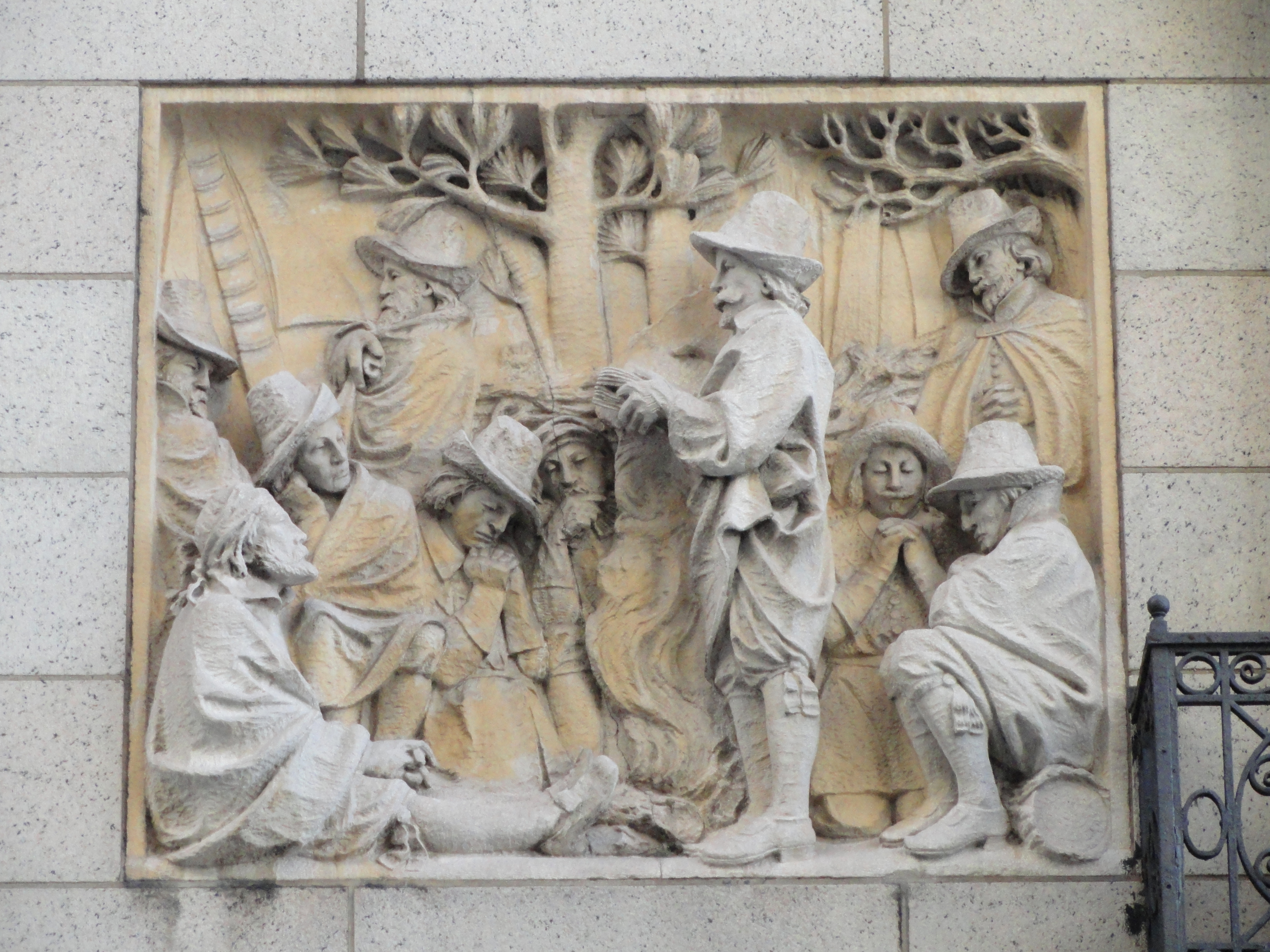
Observance of the Sabbath on Clark's Island, Prior to Landing on Plymouth Rock

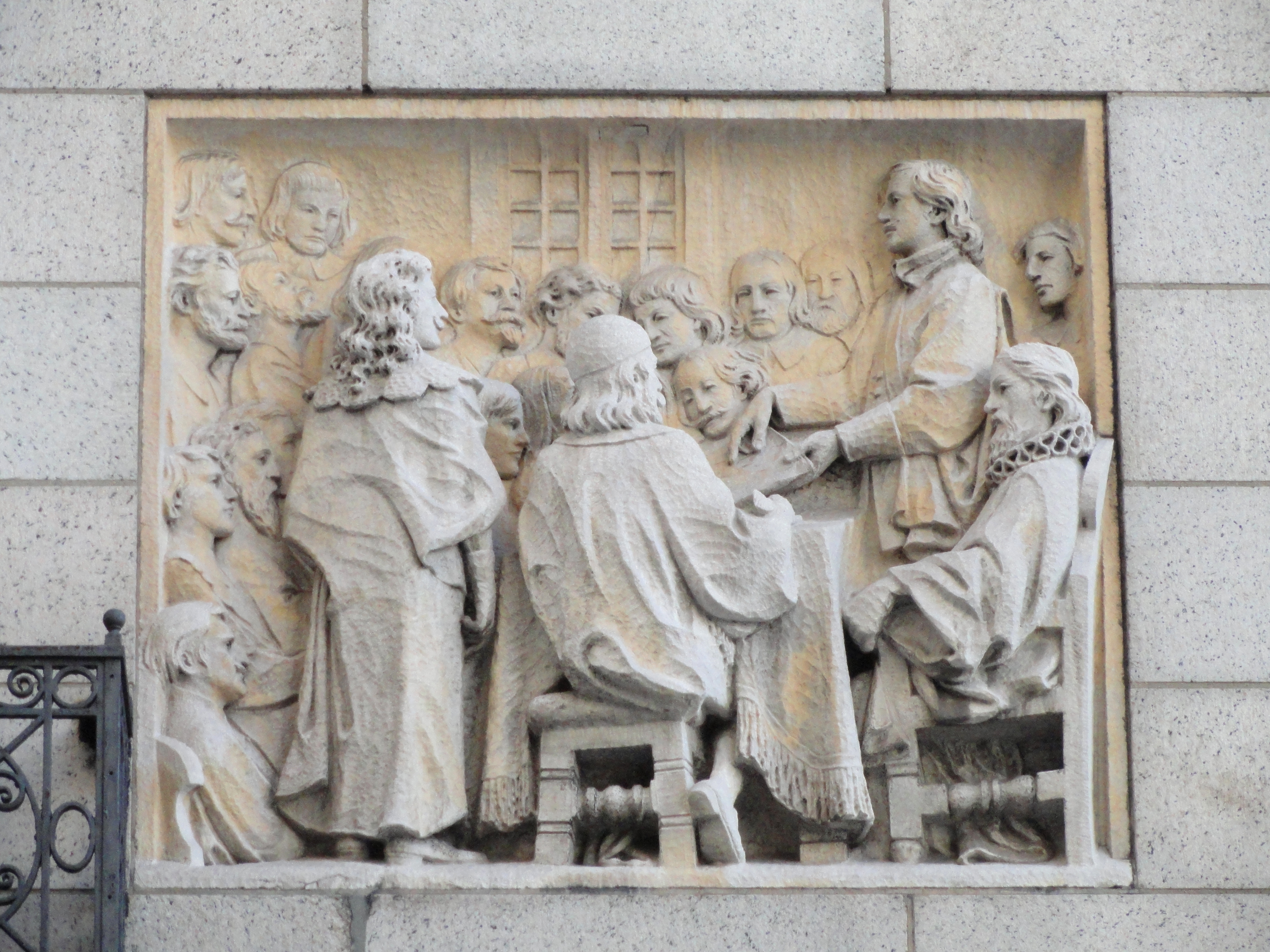
Act of the General Court of Massachusetts and the Founding of Harvard College

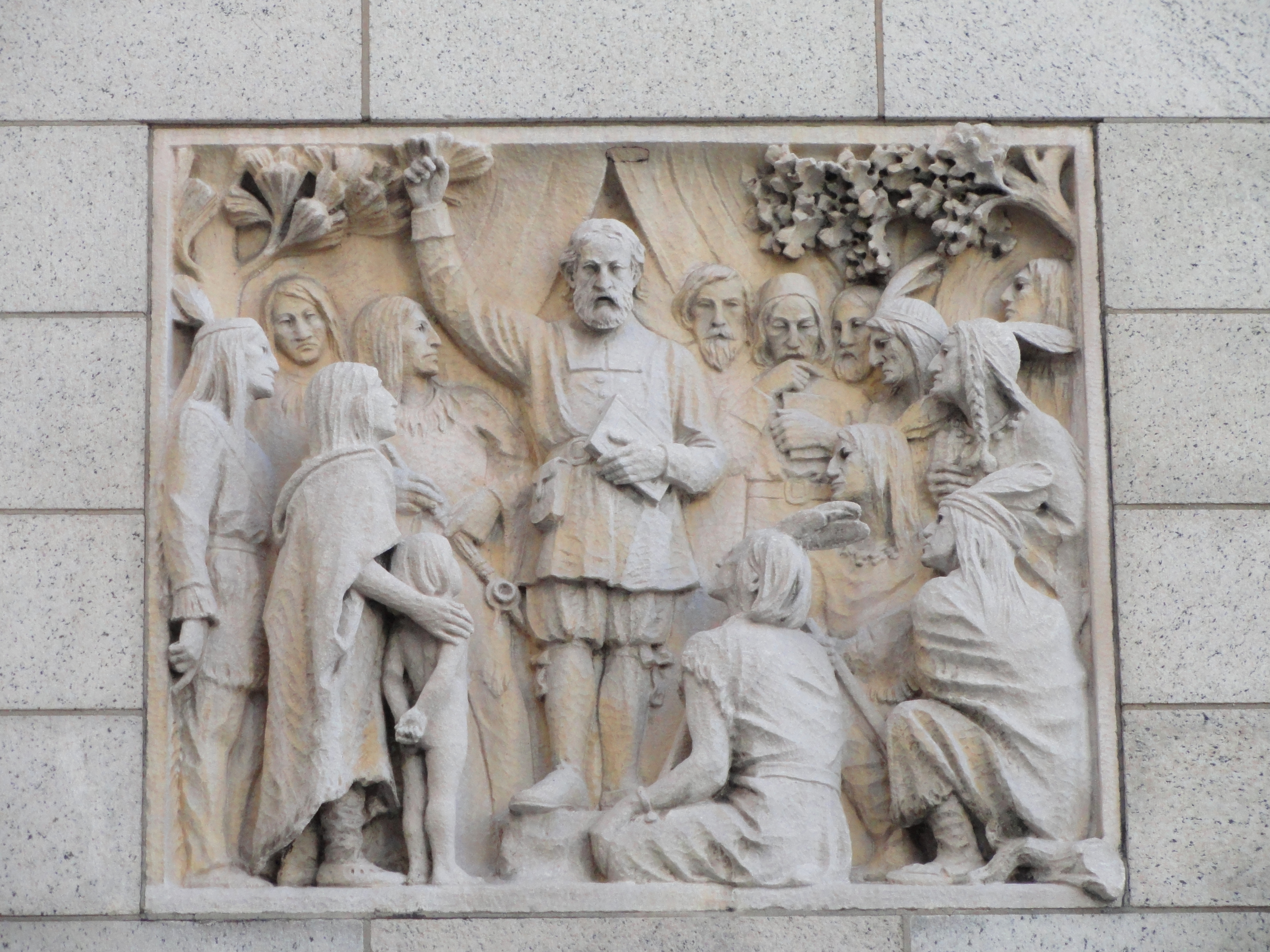
Preaching of the Apostle John Eliot to the Indians at Waban's Wigwam

== Collections and Programs ==
=== Holdings ===
While the Congregational Library & Archives was founded as a library for Congregational ministers, it has evolved into a research library and repository for some 250,000 books, pamphlets, and periodicals, documenting the growth and development of the Congregational tradition in the United States, intimately bound up with early American history and the social movements in which Congregationalists actively participated such as abolition, temperance, and women's suffrage.

As the designated archive of the Congregational Christian churches, the Library collects material on the history of the denomination from the Puritans to its present incarnation, holding all significant institutional records from the United Church of Christ, the National Association of Congregational Christian Churches, and the Conservative Congregational Christian Conference, before and after. The Library also holds some 1,500 different periodicals representing its longstanding interest in social reform, missionary work, and education. The Congregational Library also holds rare newspapers from the Christian Connection denomination.

The Library's rare book room includes an unusually rich and complete representation of English and first-generation Puritan works, including an original copy of the Cambridge Platform of 1649. The Library's archival collection of colonial-era church records is also extensive, containing many sets of seventeenth-century documents as well as full collections from large and historically significant modern churches like Boston's Old South Church and Park Street Church. Many of these records have been digitized and made accessible as part of the New England's Hidden Histories program.

The Congregational Library also has a large sermon collection, some 15,000 individual pieces, covering the period from the late 1600s to the twentieth century, in both manuscript and printed form.

== Visiting ==
The Congregational Library & Archives is open to the public on Monday through Friday from 9:00 a.m. to 5:00 p.m. with some exceptions for after hours events.

There is no admissions fee into the Library and the reading room is free and open to the public to visitors and researchers alike who may request access to any of the items in the collection, including the rare books collection. Book borrowing is limited to Library members but scans of specific materials can be made in the reading room or via email for a small fee to non-members.

The Library is located a short walk from the Massachusetts State House, King's Chapel, Park Street Church, Boston Common and the Library's reading room looks out over the Granary Burying Ground.

== In popular culture ==
The facade of the Congregational House is used as the office building of Cage & Fish, the fictional law firm of the legal comedy-drama Ally McBeal (1997-2002).

The stacks of the Library were used in the 1988 legal drama film A Civil Action.
