= Domingo Mora =

American sculptor

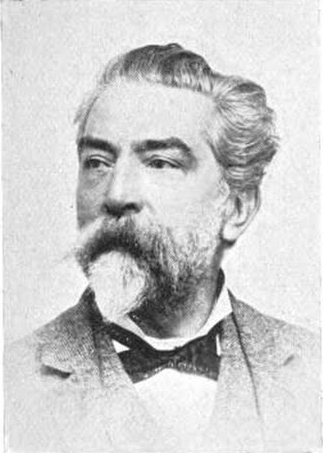
- Portrait of Domingo Mora, c. 1895
- Born: 1840; Catalonia, Spain
- Died: 1911 (aged 70–71); San Francisco, California, United States
- Children: F. Luis Mora; Jo Mora

Domingo Mora (1840–1911) was a Spanish-American sculptor and architectural sculptor.

== Career ==
Born in Catalonia, Spain, he studied sculpture in Barcelona and Madrid. He emigrated to Montevideo, Uruguay, where he married Laura Gaillard, a cultured French woman originally from the Bordeaux region of France. Laura Gaillard Mora had two sisters, Ernestina and Gabriella, who married into the Bacardi family, famous for its rum. They had two sons, both of whom became artists – F. Luis Mora (1874–1940) and Jo Mora (1876–1947).

The family left Uruguay during an insurgency in 1877, when they went to Catalonia. In 1880, they arrived in New York City, and quickly relocated to Perth Amboy, New Jersey, where Domingo Mora became chief designer for the A.H. White Terra Cotta Company, which was renamed The Perth Amboy Terra Cotta Company. There, he designed architectural sculpture for hundreds of buildings, including New York City's Metropolitan Opera House. The family would later relocate to Allston, Massachusetts (near Boston), where Domingo Mora had sculpture commissions. He later settled in California.

He was a member of the National Sculpture Society. Mora died in San Francisco, California, on July 24, 1911.

== Selected works ==
- Bas-relief panels on facade, Metropolitan Opera House, Broadway & 39th Street, New York City, J. Cleaveland Cady, architect (1882–83, demolished 1967).
- Reredos, All Saints Ashmont Episcopal Church, 209 Ashmont Street, Dorchester, Massachusetts, Ralph Adams Cram, architect (1892–93).
- Rotch reredos, Emmanuel Episcopal Church, Boston, designed by Francis R. Allen, architect, 1904.
- Pedimental sculptures, New York Criminal Courts Building, Center & White Streets, New York City, Thom & Wilson, architects (1892–94, demolished ca.1939).
- 16 lifesize allegorical figures, Great Hall, Suffolk County Courthouse (now John Adams Courthouse), Pemberton Square, Boston, Massachusetts, George Albert Clough, architect (1893–94).
- Architectural ornament, Tremont Temple, 88 Tremont Street, Boston, Massachusetts, Clarence Blackall, architect (1895–96).
- Architectural ornament, capitals and friezes on the George Walter Vincent Smith Art Museum, Springfield, Massachusetts (1895).
- Bas-relief panels on facade, Congregational House (now Congregational Library & Archives), 14 Beacon Street, Boston, Massachusetts, Shepley, Rutan and Coolidge, architects (1898).
- Ceiling frieze of Music Room, J. P. Morgan Library, 225 Madison Avenue, New York City, McKim, Mead & White, architects (1907).
- Architectural sculpture, Newhall Building, 260 California Street, San Francisco, California, Lewis P. Hobart, architect (1908–10).
- Bas-relief panels on façade, Orpheum Theatre (now Palace Theatre), 620 S. Broadway, Los Angeles, California, G. Albert Lansburgh, architect (1911).
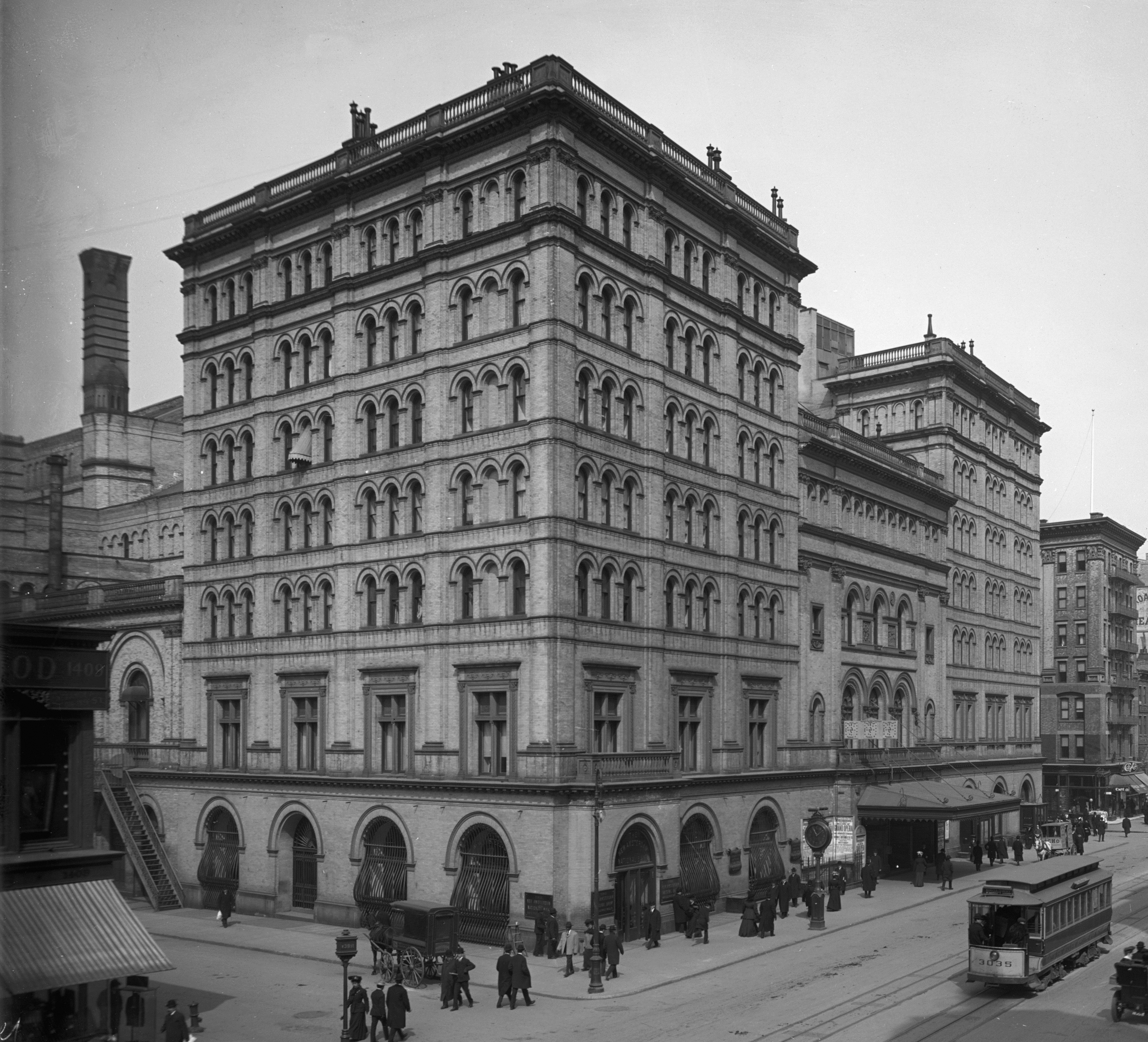
Metropolitan Opera House, New York City (1882–83, demolished 1967).

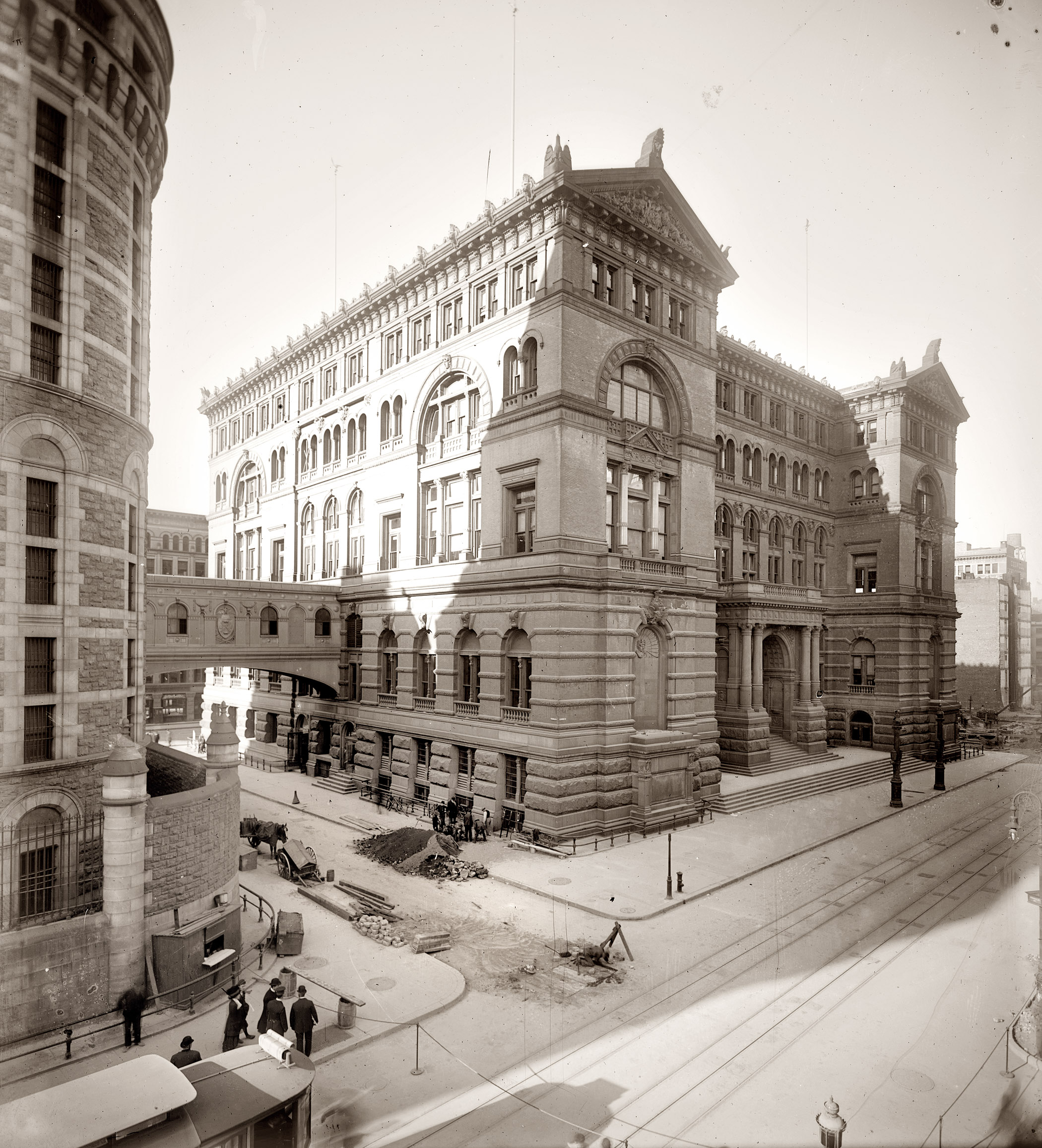
Pedimental sculptures, New York Criminal Courts Building, New York City (1894, demolished ca.1939).

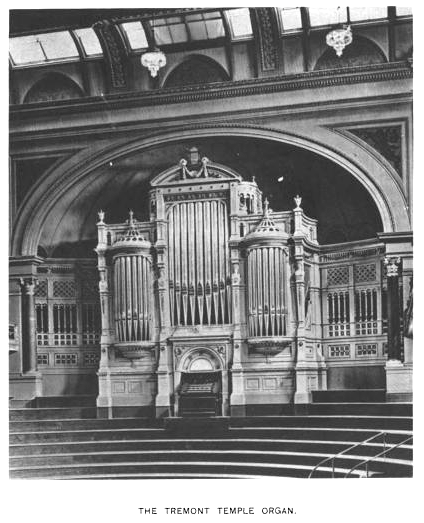
Tremont Temple interior, Boston, Massachusetts (1895–96).

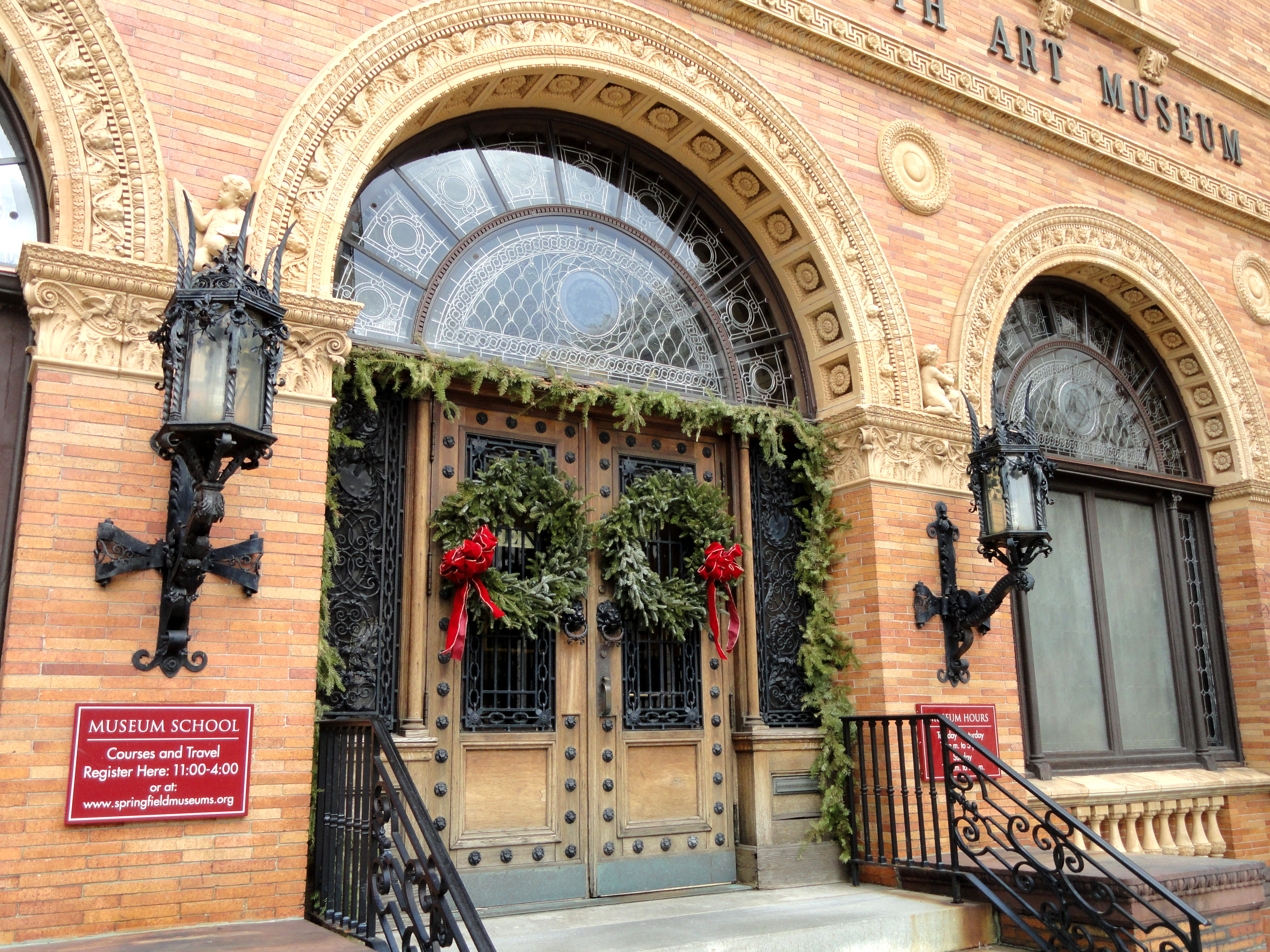
Terra-cotta entryway to the George Walter Vincent Smith Art Museum, in Springfield, Massachusetts (1895).

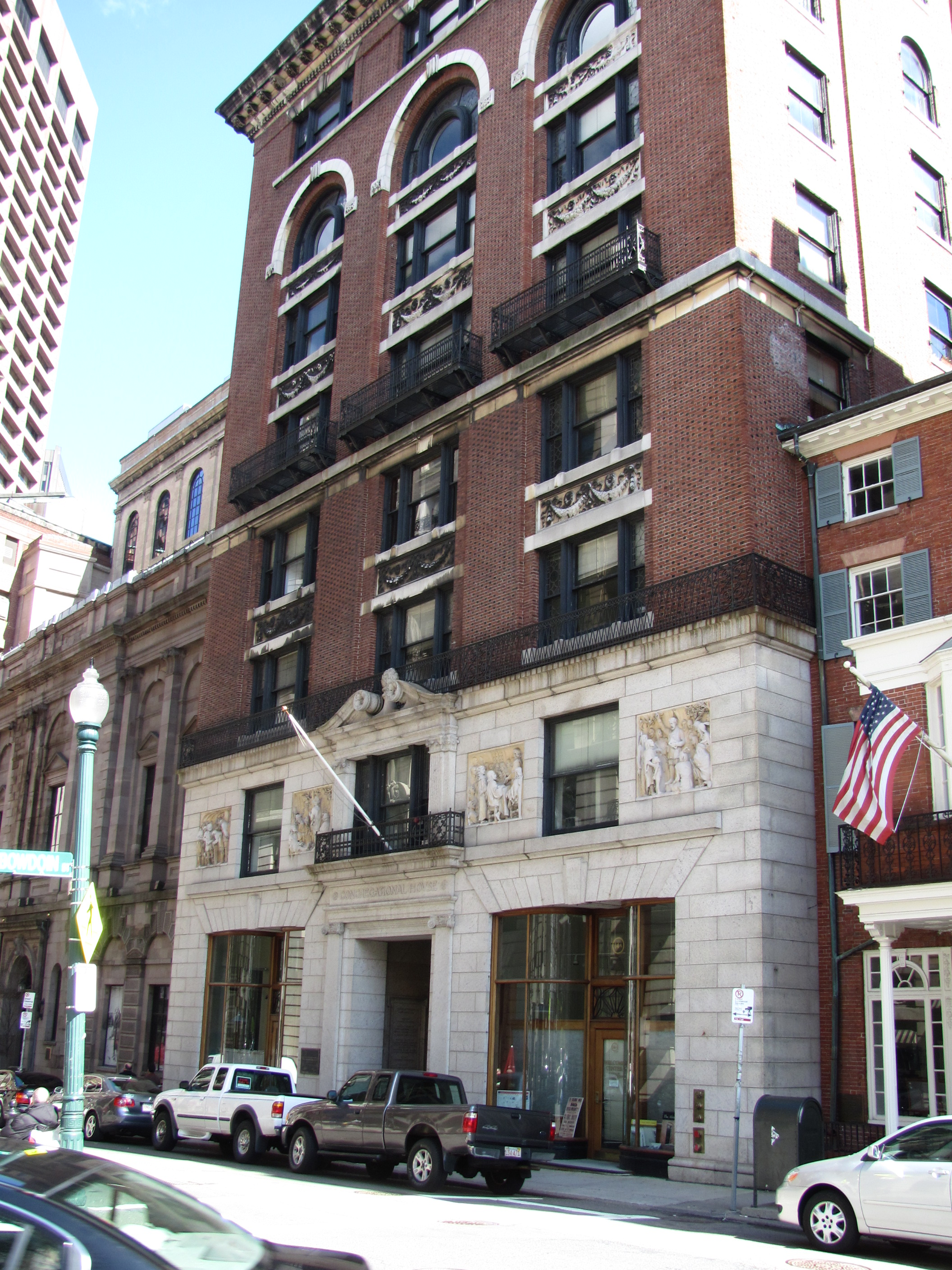
Congregational Library & Archives, Boston, Massachusetts (1898).

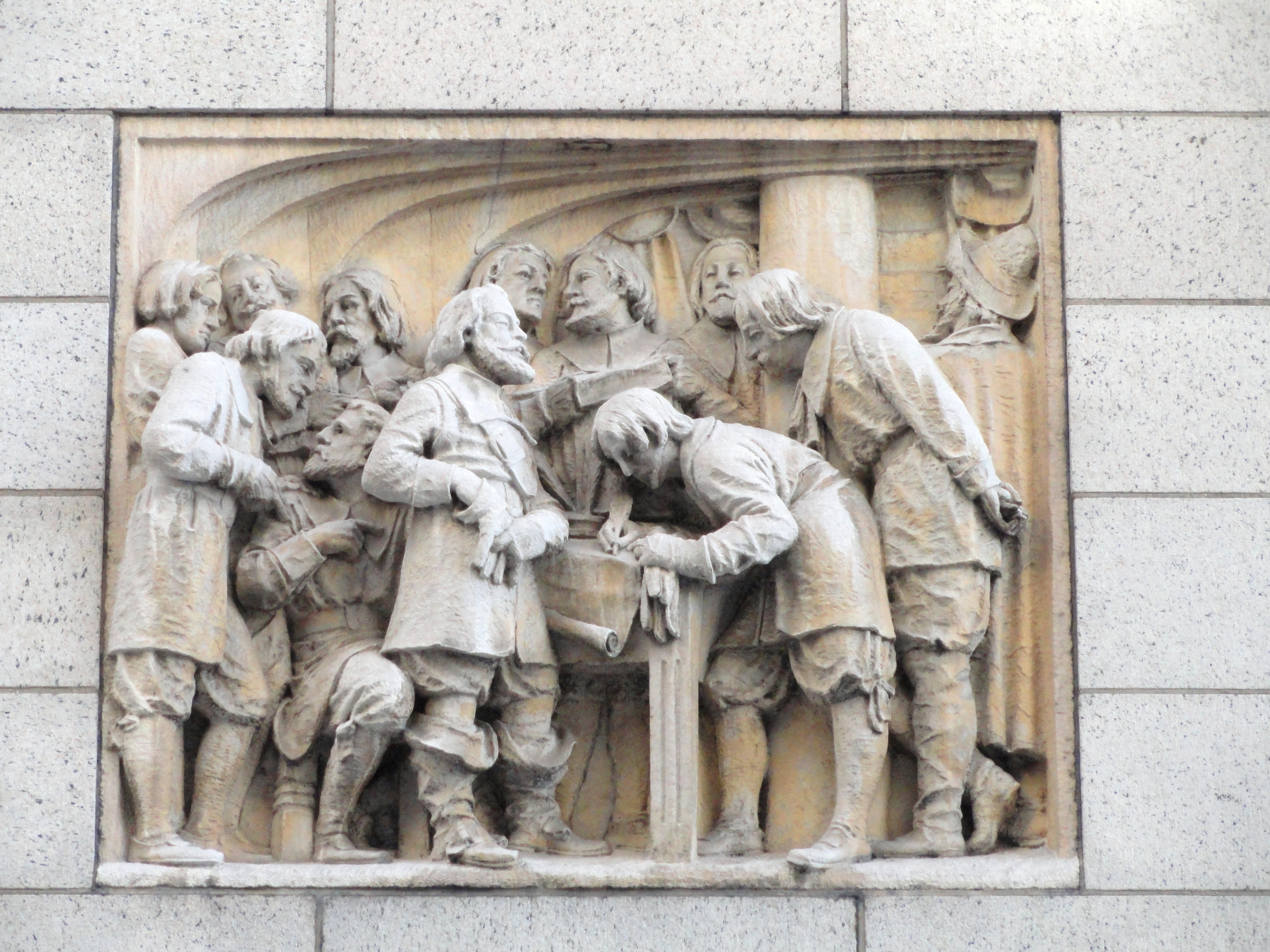
"Law" bas-relief panel, Congregational Library & Archives, Boston, Massachusetts (1898).

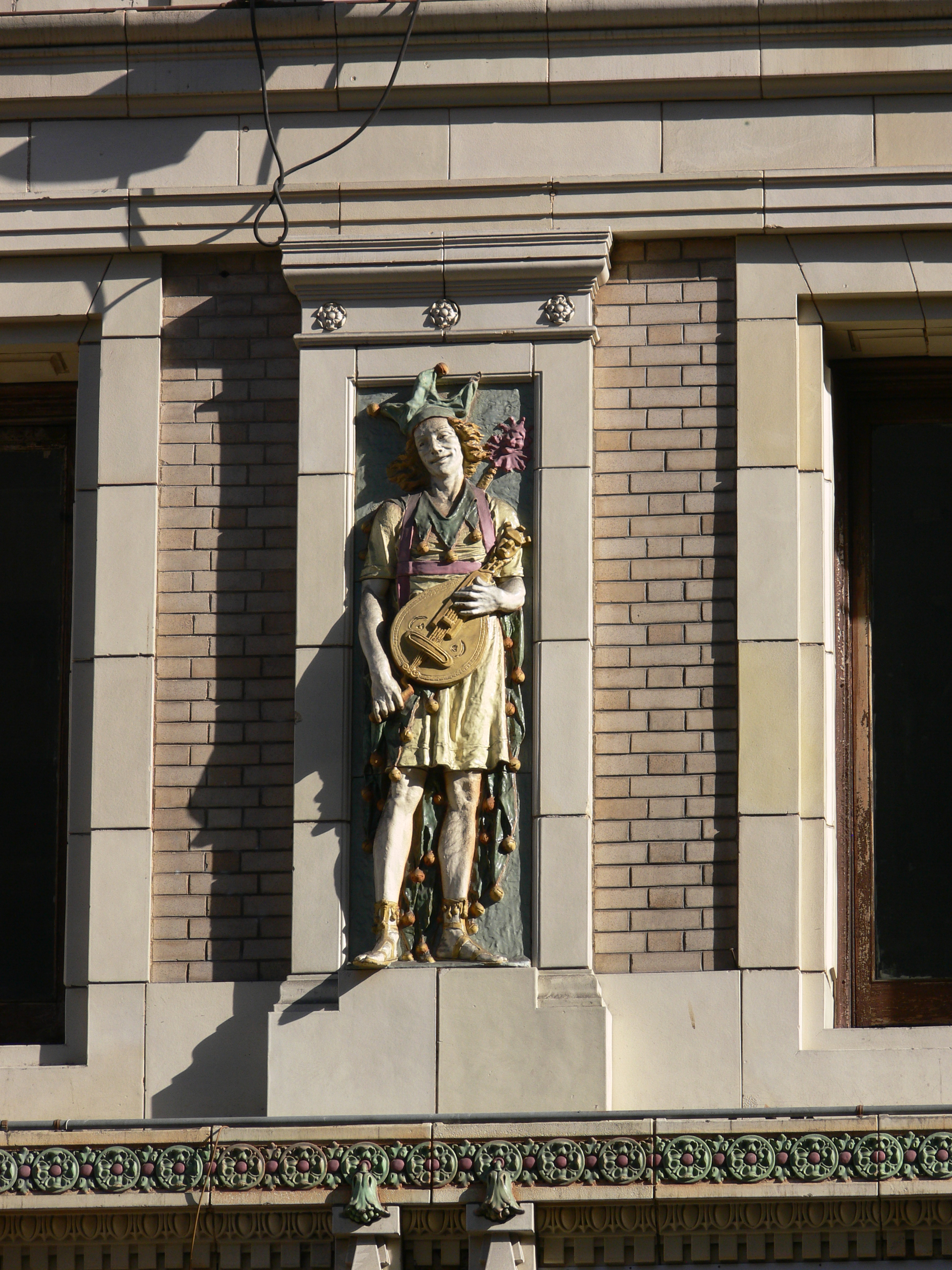
"Troubador" bas-relief panel, Palace Theatre, Los Angeles, California (1911).

== Sources ==
- Oswald Spier, "Domingo Mora—A Sculptor in Clay," The Brickbuilder, An Architectural Monthly (Boston: Rogers & Manson, February 1912), pp. 28–32.
