= Elizabeth Nottingham =

American painter (1907–1956)

- Self-portrait by Elizabeth Nottingham
- Born: November 29, 1907; Salisbury
- Died: April 2, 1956 (aged 48); Staunton
- Alma mater: Art Students League of New York
- Occupation: Painter, artist
- Employer: Mary Baldwin University
- Spouse(s): Horace Day

Mary Elizabeth Nottingham Day (November 29, 1907 – April 2, 1956) was a painter under the professional name Elizabeth Nottingham. She was primarily known for her work depicting the landscape of Virginia. With her husband, painter Horace Day, she co-directed the art department of Mary Baldwin College in Staunton, Virginia from 1941 to 1956.

== Life and career ==
Mary Elizabeth Nottingham was born on November 29, 1907, in Salisbury, North Carolina, and grew up in Culpeper, Virginia, a place she often depicted in her later work. She graduated from Randolph-Macon Woman's College in Lynchburg, Virginia in 1928.

Nottingham attended the Art Students League of New York for three years, studying under George Bridgman, Kenneth Hayes Miller, Kimon Nicolaïdes, and John Sloan. She studied in Europe thanks to a Tiffany Foundation Fellowship (1930) and an Edward McDowell Traveling Fellowship (1931). In 1933, she returned to Virginia.

1934 was an important year for Nottingham's art career. She had her first one-woman show at the Richmond Academy of Arts. Her painting Culpeper Street, a watercolor depiction of Davis street in Culpeper, was purchased by Eleanor Roosevelt for display in the White House. Nottingham was hired by the Public Works of Art Project to create two historical panels for John Handley High School in Winchester, Virginia and 28 watercolor landscapes of Virginia.

She became director of the Federal Art Project galleries at Big Stone Gap, Virginia and Lynchburg, Virginia in 1936. She later served as assistant state art supervisor for the Works Progress Administration in Virginia.

She married painter Horace Day in 1941 and they became co-directors of the art department at Mary Baldwin College, a responsibility they shared until her death in 1956. She was president of the Virginia Art Alliance and served on the Virginia State Art Commission from 1950 to 1956.

Mary Elizabeth Nottingham Day died on April 2, 1956, at the age of 48, at Kings' Daughter's Hospital in Staunton, Virginia.

In 2016, the Library of Virginia added her name to their list of Virginia Women in History. In 2018 the Virginia Capitol Foundation announced that Nottingham's name would be included on the Virginia Women's Monument's glass Wall of Honor.
