= Helen Winslow Durkee =

American painter

- Born: 1880
- Died: 1954 (aged 73–74)
- Education: Smith College; Art Students League of New York
- Known for: Painting
- Style: Portrait miniature; still life

Helen Winslow Durkee (1880–1954) was an American painter of portrait miniatures and still lifes.

Born in Brooklyn, Durkee was an alumna of Smith College who returned to New York City after graduation and studied art at the Art Students League from 1910 to 1918. Her instructors there included William Merritt Chase, Frank Vincent DuMond, George Bridgman, F. Luis Mora, Kenneth Hayes Miller, and Dmitri Romanoffsky. From 1911 to 1918 she was the League's women's vice-president. Beginning around 1907 she exhibited regularly continuing through the 1920s. She was a member of the American Society of Miniature Painters, the Pennsylvania Society of Miniature Painters, and the National Association of Women Painters and Sculptors. She won a scholarship prize during her time at the Art Students' League, and received the Charlotte Ritchie Smith Memorial Prize from the Baltimore Water Color Club in 1921, besides honorable mentions elsewhere. During World War I she interrupted her career to serve in France for one year with her alma mater's canteen unit of the YMCA; upon her return she married Captain Christopher John Mileham of London, an officer who had served in France with the British Expeditionary Forces.

A miniature portrait by Durkee of her uncle, William Wills Durkee, is currently owned by the Metropolitan Museum of Art, as are a miniature still life of onions and a scene titled In the Studio.
