= F. Luis Mora =

Uruguayan-American painter (1874–1940)

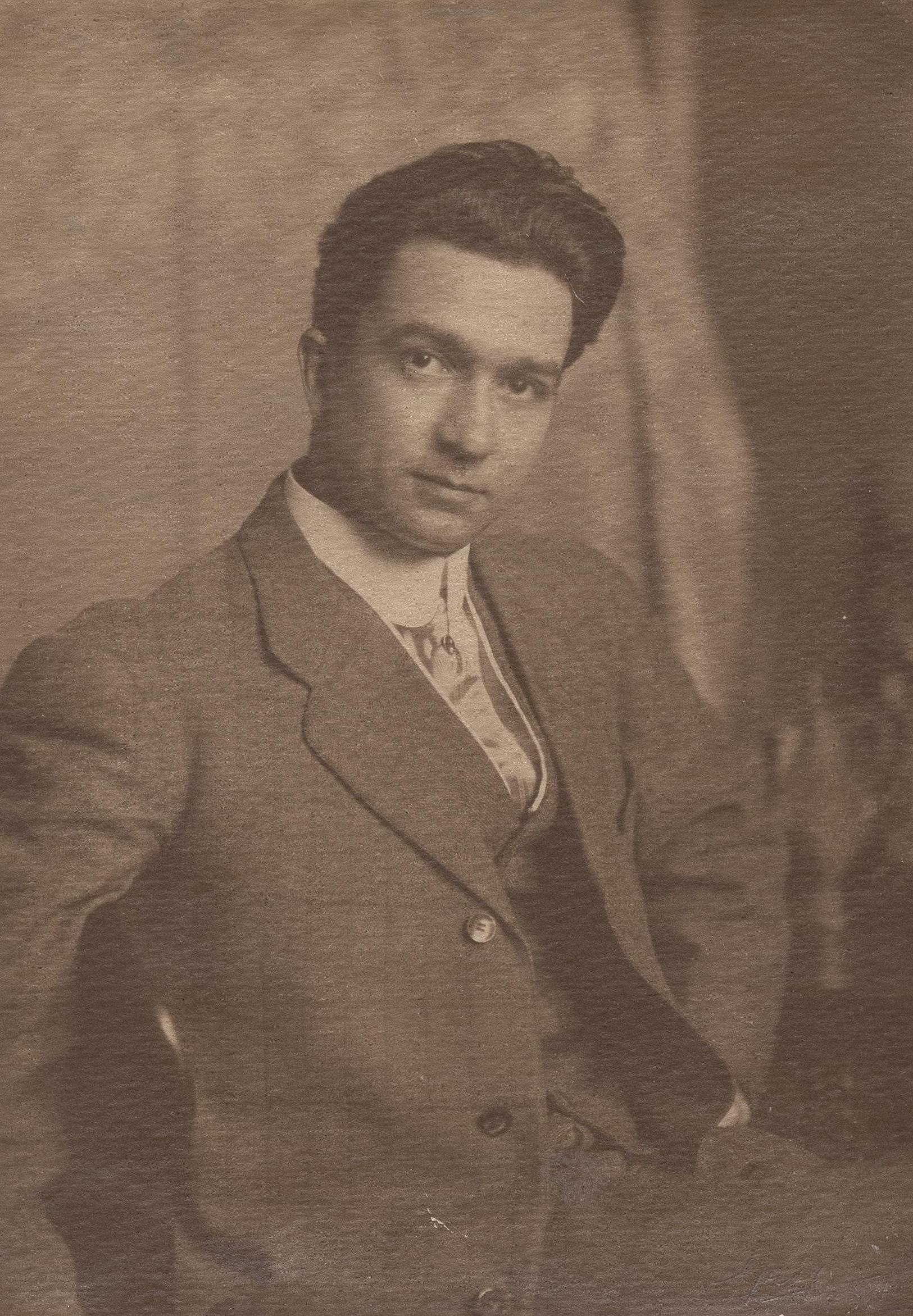
- F. Luis Mora in 1910
- Born: July 27, 1874; Montevideo, Uruguay
- Died: June 5, 1940 (aged 65); New York, United States
- Parent: Domingo Mora
- Relatives: Jo Mora

Francis Luis Mora (July 27, 1874 – June 5, 1940) was a Uruguayan-born American figural painter. Mora worked in watercolor, oils and tempera. He produced drawings in pen and ink, and graphite; and etchings and monotypes. He is known for his paintings and drawings depicting American life in the early 20th century; Spanish life and society; historical and allegorical subjects; with murals, easel painting and illustrations. He also was a popular art instructor.

== Early years and education ==
F. Luis Mora was born in Montevideo, Uruguay, to Domingo Mora, a noted sculptor from Catalonia, and Laura Gaillard, a cultured French woman originally from the Bordeaux region of France. Laura Gaillard Mora had two sisters, Ernestina and Gabriella, who married into the Bacardi family, famous for its rum. Mora was close to the Bacardi family all of his life. He had a younger brother, Joseph Jacinto "Jo" Mora, who would go on to become a noted sculptor, photographer and author in California.

The family left Uruguay during an insurgency in 1877, when they went to Catalonia. In 1880, they arrived in New York City, and quickly relocated to Perth Amboy, New Jersey, where Domingo Mora accepted a position with the A.H. White Terra Cotta Company, which was renamed The Perth Amboy Terra Cotta Company. The family would later relocate to Allston, Massachusetts (near Boston), where Domingo Mora had sculpture commissions. Mora graduated from Allston High School, and stated in a later interview that he remembered the school fondly. During the Economic Crash of 1893, they all went back to Perth Amboy, New Jersey, which remained Mora's home base all of his life.

While he was a child, Mora's father oversaw his early education in the arts, and young Luis produced hundreds of drawings and watercolors. He was a precocious young artist, drawing historical scenes and scenes of his contemporary environs. At the age of fifteen Mora enrolled in the School of the Museum of Fine Arts, Boston, where he studied under the American Impressionists Edmund Charles Tarbell and Frank Weston Benson. In 1892, Mora went on to complete his education at the Art Students League of New York, studying with Henry Siddons Mowbray. By 1892, he was also receiving commissions for illustrations in popular magazines of the era. His formal art education was complete in 1893, when he was just 19 years old.

In 1896 when he was 22 years old, Mora traveled to Europe with his mother, his third trip to Europe. The two visited family in Barcelona and then headed to Madrid, where Mora coincidentally saw William Merritt Chase in the Museo del Prado. It was there, alongside Chase, that Mora became inspired by the art of Diego Velázquez and other Spanish Old Masters. Over the course of many visits to the Prado, Mora practiced and refined his technique by painting copies of Velasquez's works.

In 1900, Mora married the daughter of the mayor of Perth Amboy, New Jersey, Sophia ("Sonia") Brown Compton, who was his childhood sweetheart. She encouraged his easel painting, and he set forth on a successful career.

== Professional career ==
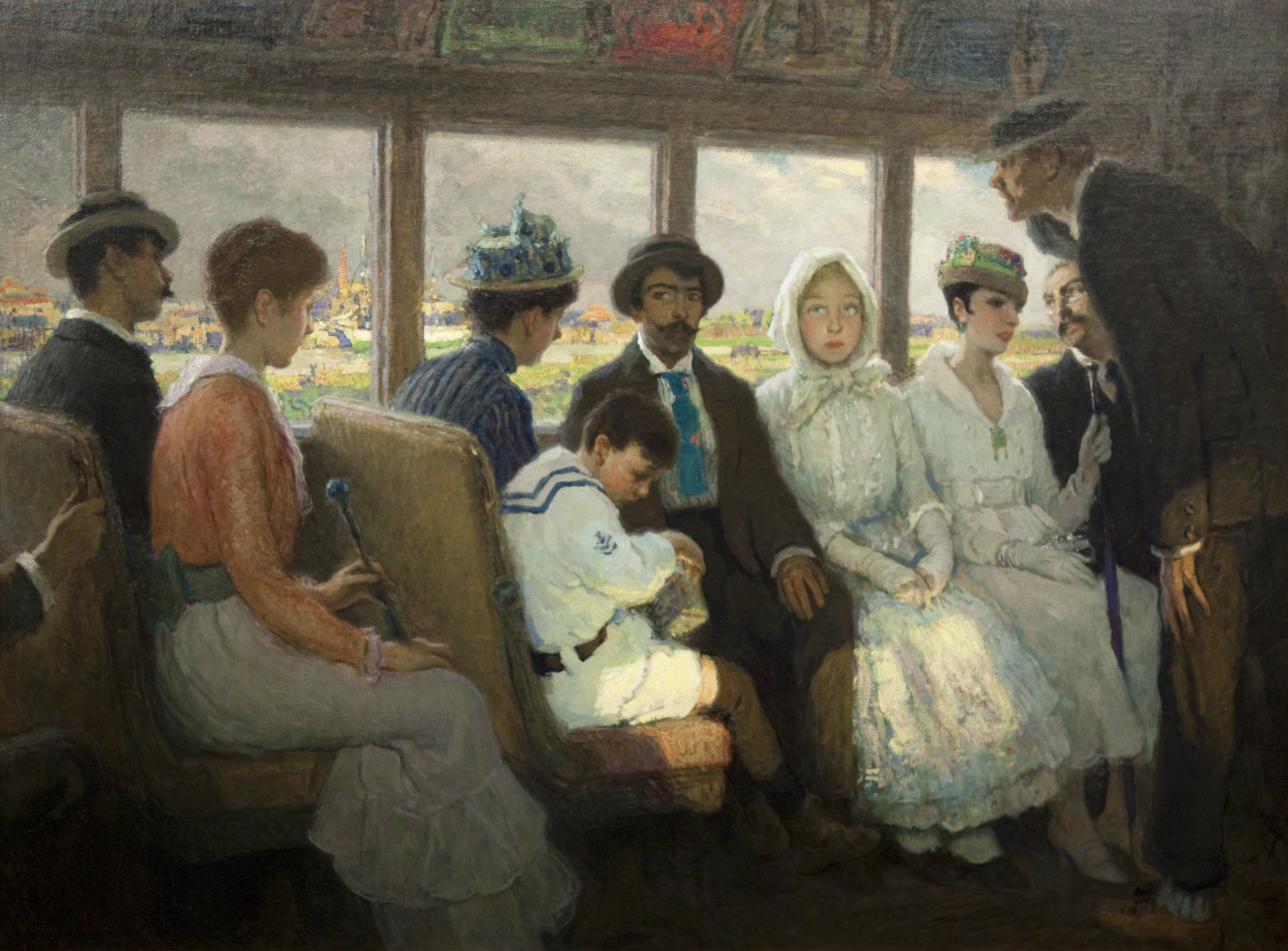
Out of Town Trolley (1916)

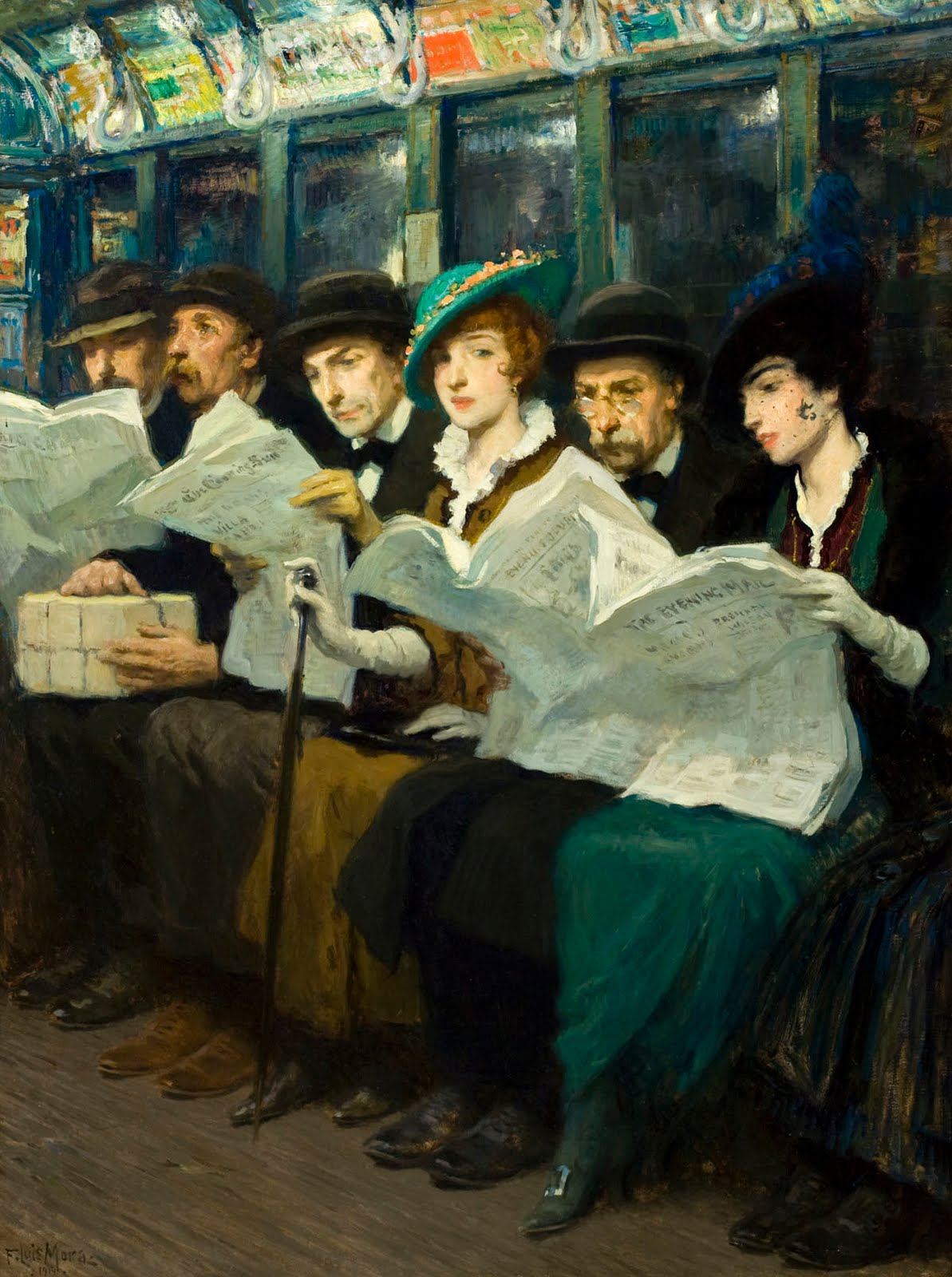
Subway riders in NYC

In 1904 Mora was voted an Associate member of the National Academy of Design, and was elected a full member in 1906, probably its first Hispanic member. He was also voted as a member to 15 other art societies. Mora won numerous medals and awards within the New York artistic community, including the Rothschild Prize, the Carnegie Prize, the Shaw Purchase Prize at the Salmagundi Club; and in 1915 he won a gold medal at the Panama–Pacific International Exposition in San Francisco.

Mora taught illustration and life classes at both William Merritt Chase's Chase School of Art (renamed the New York School of Art in 1898, later to become Parsons) and the Art Students League. Among his students was Georgia O'Keeffe, who studied with him between 1907 and 1908; another was the miniaturist Helen Winslow Durkee, and a third was the painter Molly Luce. During this time Mora also embarked upon a successful and prolific career as an illustrator, producing work for several books and publications, including Harper's Weekly, Scribner's, The Century, Collier's, Sunday Magazine, and Ladies' Home Journal. During World War I Mora was one of several illustrators who volunteered to create motivational World War I posters for the Third and Fourth Liberty Loan Boards, U.S. Committee on Public Information, Addtionally, in 1918 he created a highly effective poster for the United States Children's Bureau in support of a long term public health effort to ensure that new recruits into the Armed Services would meet basic health and fitness standards.

In addition to his success as an easel painter and illustrator, Mora became a well known muralist. His first mural, in 1900, was a commission for the Lynn Public Library in Lynn, Massachusetts. Following that, Mora received a commission for the Missouri State Building at the Louisiana Purchase Exposition (also known as the St. Louis World's Fair)in 1904. He continued to receive commissions, including murals for Columbia College, the Governor's Mansion of New Jersey, the Red Cross, The Town Club and Bar in Manhattan, the 1939 New York World's Fair, and in the Sears family (Sears & Roebuck) country home in Brookline, Massachusetts.

Mora was also a successful portraitist who counted Andrew Carnegie among his subjects. After at least one attempt by another artist, Mora was selected by the Fine Arts Commission to paint a posthumous portrait of President Warren G. Harding. That portrait remains on permanent display in the White House. He painted portraits of Society matrons and their children, prominent physicians and attorneys; and around 1915 he painted a series of portraits of actresses and dancers, including Isadora Duncan and Jeanne Cartier.

Mora would return to Spain frequently throughout his career, and he had at least two extended stays when he painted. During 1905, he rented a studio in Madrid from which to work, and in 1909 he and Sonia spent an entire year abroad when he took a studio in Seville.

He and Sonia bought land in Gaylordsville, Connecticut in 1913, where he painted an array of easel paintings of everyday life in the countryside. On July 22, 1918, Mora's daughter, Rosemary, was born. She became his constant subject, and in 1921 he had a solo exhibition at the venerable William Macbeth Gallery, entitled "An American Summer," with many watercolors picturing toddler Rosemary. In 1923, he completed his summer home and studio; and in 1924, Mora was a co-founder of the Kent Art Association in Connecticut. In 1927 Mora had a solo exhibition at the Buenos Aires Museo de Bellas Artes (Argentina), which received glowing reviews in The New York Times.

In January 1928 Luis visited his younger brother, Jo Mora, in Carmel-by-the-Sea, California and was feted by the Carmel Art Association, which opened a highly publicized “special exhibition” of his paintings on May 1. Unfortunately, he plunged headlong into a raging controversy over juried exhibitions at the Association; Luis opposed culling by juries. In 1931, Luis Mora's beloved wife, Sonia, died suddenly of food poisoning. A few months later, he took Rosemary out of school and went to live with Jo who had recently moved from Carmel to nearby Pebble Beach. He soon returned to New York in 1932 to marry a former portrait sitter and wealthy widow, May Safford. Mora was 58 years old, and May was 53 and had a grown daughter who was already married. Although he continued to exhibit, he won no further medals and few, if any, of his easel paintings were selling. Because of the Great Depression, he also suffered a dearth of portrait commissions, and his illustrations became few. Sadly, May did not get along with Rosemary; and Mora sent Rosemary to expensive boarding schools, further compromising his financial situation. Mora gradually ran out of money, and in 1939 he rented his beloved Gaylordsville property to strangers.

Mora died on June 5, 1940, in May's elegant apartment in New York. He was 64.

== Artistic significance ==
Mora is known for his attempts to translate the techniques of the Spanish Old Masters to a modern American idiom. Since Mora's initial travels in Spain coincided with the emergence of the Generation of '98, a portion of his oeuvre has been interpreted as an attempt to understand modern Spain and Spanish–U.S. relations in the aftermath of the Spanish–American War. He also produced a series of nudes, many with Spanish shawls as backdrops. He painted a portrait of his only daughter, Rosemary, "In Costume" in 1925, showing her as a little Senorita pushing a doll carriage.

Mora also produced a large series of Impressionist paintings with American subjects. Many pictured life in the Connecticut and New Jersey countryside, and picnic scenes. He loved children, and some of his most notable and published scenes pictured happy youngsters at play. He was also interested in music and theater, and painted scenes with American actresses and dancers. He was elected to fifteen art societies where he won many medals and awards.

He had numerous solo shows in museums and in galleries. He exhibited across the United States, in New York City and State, Indiana, California, Georgia, and others. His galleryist patrons were William Macbeth, Alfred Stieglitz and Edward Milch, all known for showing the best American artists of the era. Mora participated in group shows in dozens of art societies, museums and galleries. He was famous in his lifetime, but was quickly forgotten because his works were poorly handled after his death.

Only recently, with the publication of his comprehensive biography by Lynne Pauls Baron, edited by Peter Hastings Falk, has Mora's memory and works experienced accolades that he deserves. On September 20, 2008, Bacardi U.S.A., Inc. sponsored a gala celebration and lectures in Mora's honor at New York's National Art Club on Gramercy Park.

== Legacy ==
Mora's works are currently held or on display in 34 museums, including the Metropolitan Museum of Art in New York (eight works) and the Smithsonian American Art Museum. Mora's works are also held by The Butler Museum of Art in Ohio, The Newark Museum, The Telfair Museum in Savannah, The New York Historical Society, The Museum of the City of New York, the Toledo Museum of Art, Yale University Art Gallery, The National Gallery of Canada in Ottawa, National Arts Club in New York. Phoenix Art Museum, The National Academy of Design in New York, San Diego Museum of Art, and many others.

== Family relationships ==
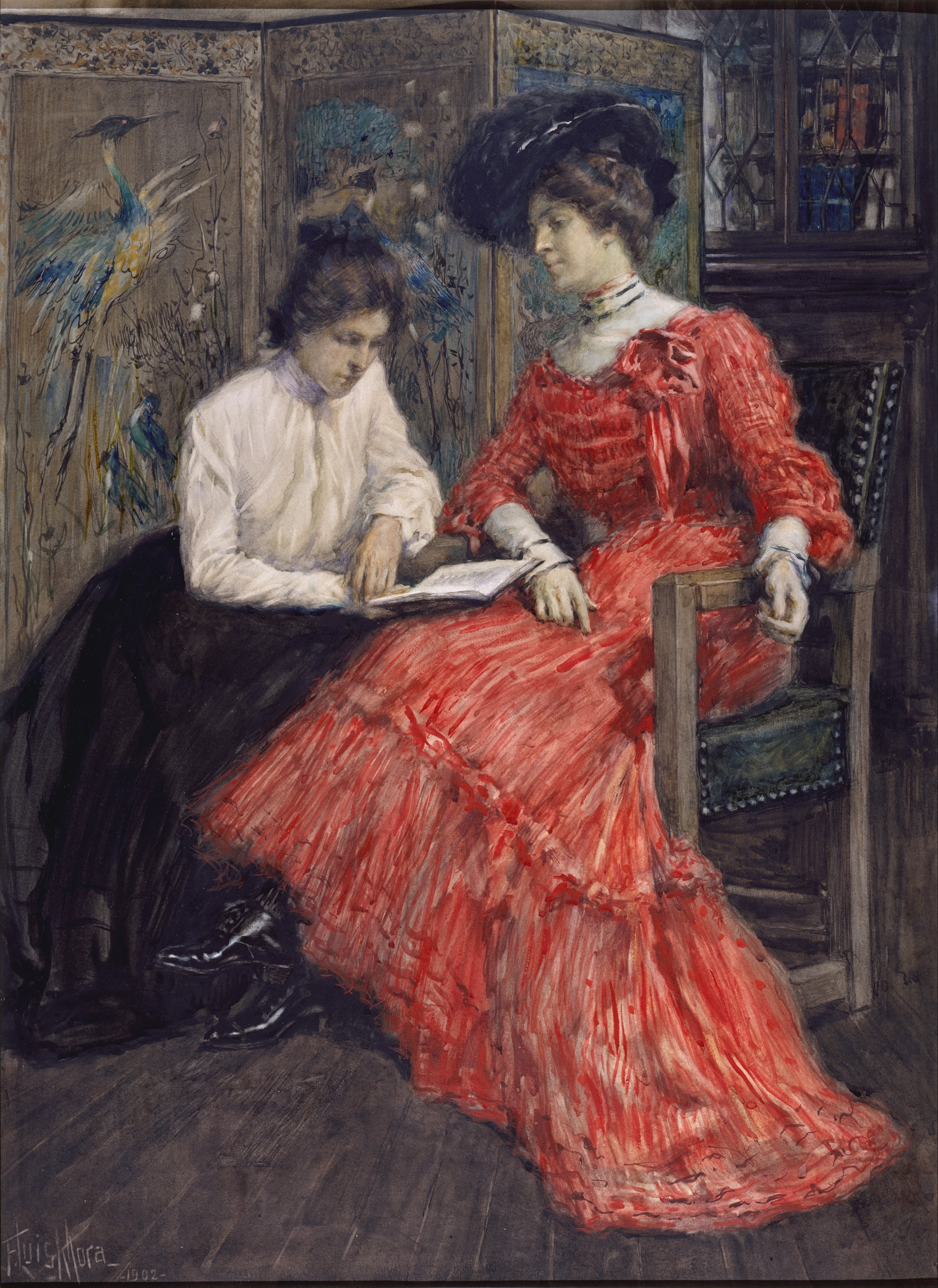
"Mrs. F. Luis Mora and Her Sister" by F. Luis Mora at the Metropolitan Museum of Art, 1902

F. Luis Mora was married for 31 years to Sophia ("Sonia") Brown Compton Mora. They had one daughter, Rosemary, who never married and never had children; and therefore Mora's direct lineage ended with her.

After Sophia died, in 1932 Mora married May Safford. May was 53 at the time, and there were no children from the marriage. Mora does not have any grandchildren or great-grandchildren.

Mora was closely related to the Bacardi family, famous for its rum. His mother was a Gaillard with two sisters who married into the Bacardi family which had many children. Mora's uncle Facundo Bacardi (married to Ernestina Gaillard) was the company's "master blender" who made rum a light, pleasant-tasting spirit.

Luis Mora's father, Domingo Mora, was Catalan with a large family in Spain. It is not known whether any Mora family members are still living in Spain.

Mora's only known living descendants are a great-niece in California, a nephew in California, a niece in New Jersey who has vivid memories of him; and many cousins in the Bacardi-Gaillard family who are directly related.

Mora's family relationships are noted in his comprehensive biography, F. Luis Mora: America's First Hispanic Master by Lynne Pauls Baron, pages 315 to 317.

== Sources ==
- Baron, Lynne Pauls. F. Luis Mora: America's First Hispanic Master [1874–1940]. Madison, CT; Falk Art Reference, 2008.
- Boone, Mary Elizabeth. Vistas de España: American Views of Art and Life in Spain, 1860–1914. New Haven: Yale University Press, 2007.
- Dearinger, David B. Painting and Sculpture in the Collection of the National Academy of Design. New York; Manchester: Hudson Hills Press, 2004.
- "Harding Hung." Time 28 Jul. 1930: n. pag. Retrieved 2 Dec. 2008.
