= Arnold Friedman =

American painter

- Born: February 23, 1879; Corona, Queens
- Died: December 29, 1946 (aged 67)
- Education: Art Students League of New York

Arnold Friedman (February 23, 1879 – December 29, 1946) was an American Modernist painter.

== Life ==
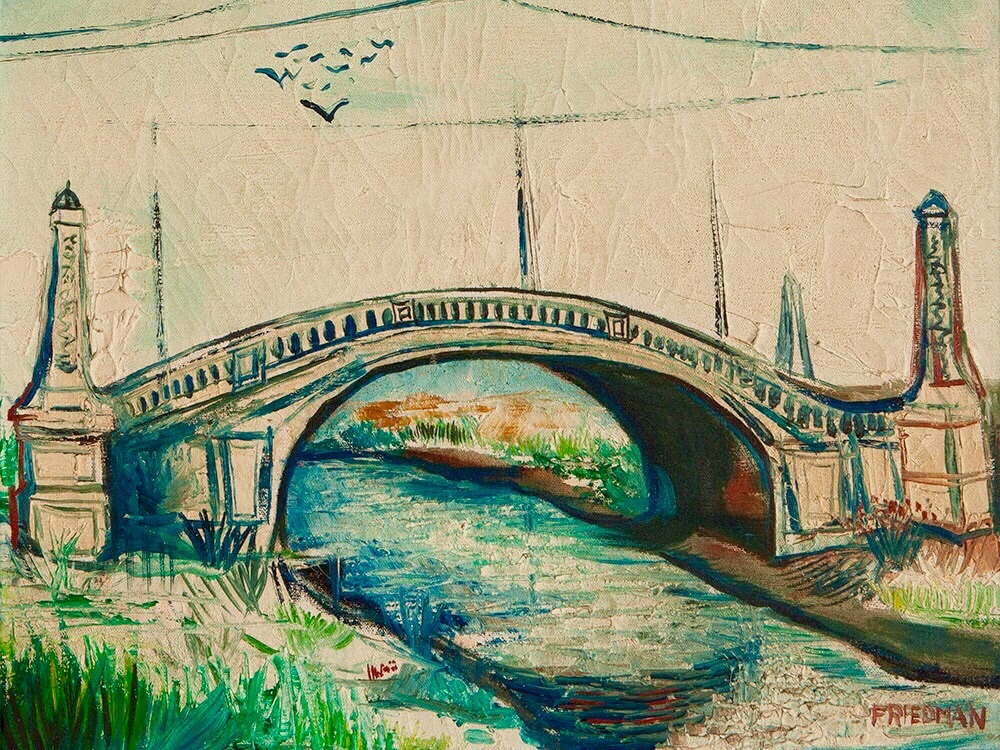
The Viaduct 1919 (Exhibition of Modern Art, Bourgeois Galleries, New York)

He was born in Corona, Queens, worked for the Federal Art Project and studied at the Art Students League of New York under the tutelage of Robert Henri and Kenneth Hayes Miller. In 1909, he took a six-month leave of absence from his job to study art in Paris. During this time, he was introduced to the styles of Impressionism and Cubism. He exhibited with many of the most avant-garde venues and dealers of the period, including the Society of Independent Artists.

Friedman painted the mural Rice Growing at the Kingstree, South Carolina post office with the help of New Deal funds in 1940. His painting Landscape has been on display at the Albright-Knox Gallery in Buffalo, New York. He also competed in the art competitions at the 1932 Summer Olympics.
