= Macbeth Gallery =

Art gallery in New York

Coordinates: 40.752010°N 73.982223°W

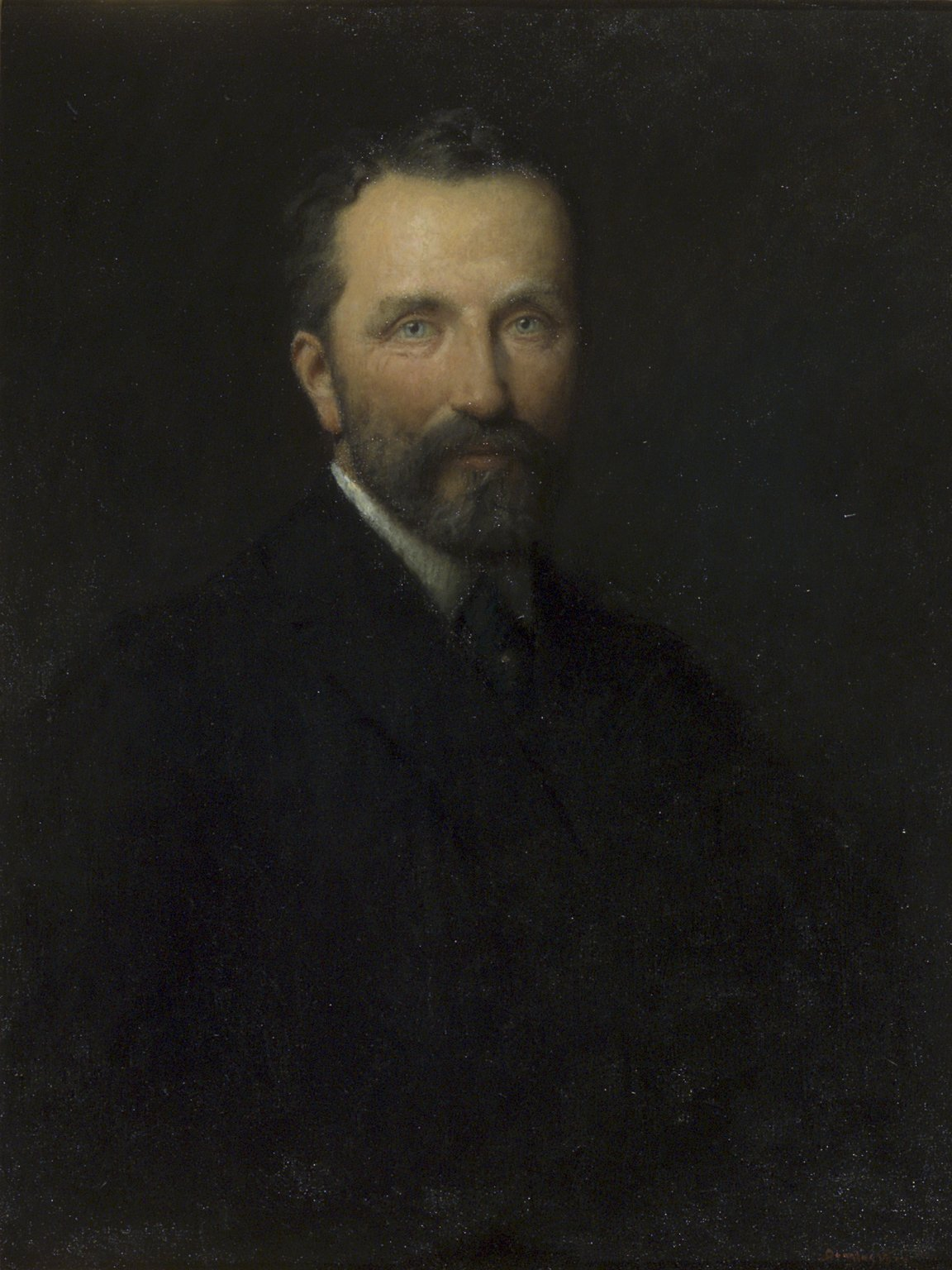
Left: William Macbeth, c.1917; Right: front cover of the gallery's 1908 exhibition catelogue

The Macbeth Gallery was an art gallery in New York City that was the first to specialize in American art. Founded by William Macbeth in 1892, the gallery gained notoriety in 1908 when it put on an exhibition protesting the restrictive policies and conservative tastes of the existing art establishment in New York, exemplified by the National Academy of Design. The exhibition showcased the work of eight artists who were known for portraying gritty scenes of daily life, especially of poorer communities in New York: Robert Henri, William Glackens, George Luks, Everett Shinn, John Sloan, Arthur Bowen Davies, Ernest Lawson, and Maurice Prendergast. Though they had varying styles, the artists were later known collectively as "The Eight". Henri, Glackens, Luks, Shinn, and Sloan were associated with the Ashcan School, and the 1908 exhibition brought increased national attention to that movement and founded their reputations.

In 1948, Andrew Wyeth's painting Christina's World was first exhibited at the Macbeth Gallery before it was purchased by the Museum of Modern Art.

As the art scene in New York shifted towards abstract expressionism in the early 1950s, the gallery, which had focused on American Realism and Impressionism, started to fall out of favor. Macbeth celebrated its sixtieth anniversary with a group exhibition in April 1952 before closing its doors in 1953.
