= Kenneth Hayes Miller =

American artist (1876–1952)

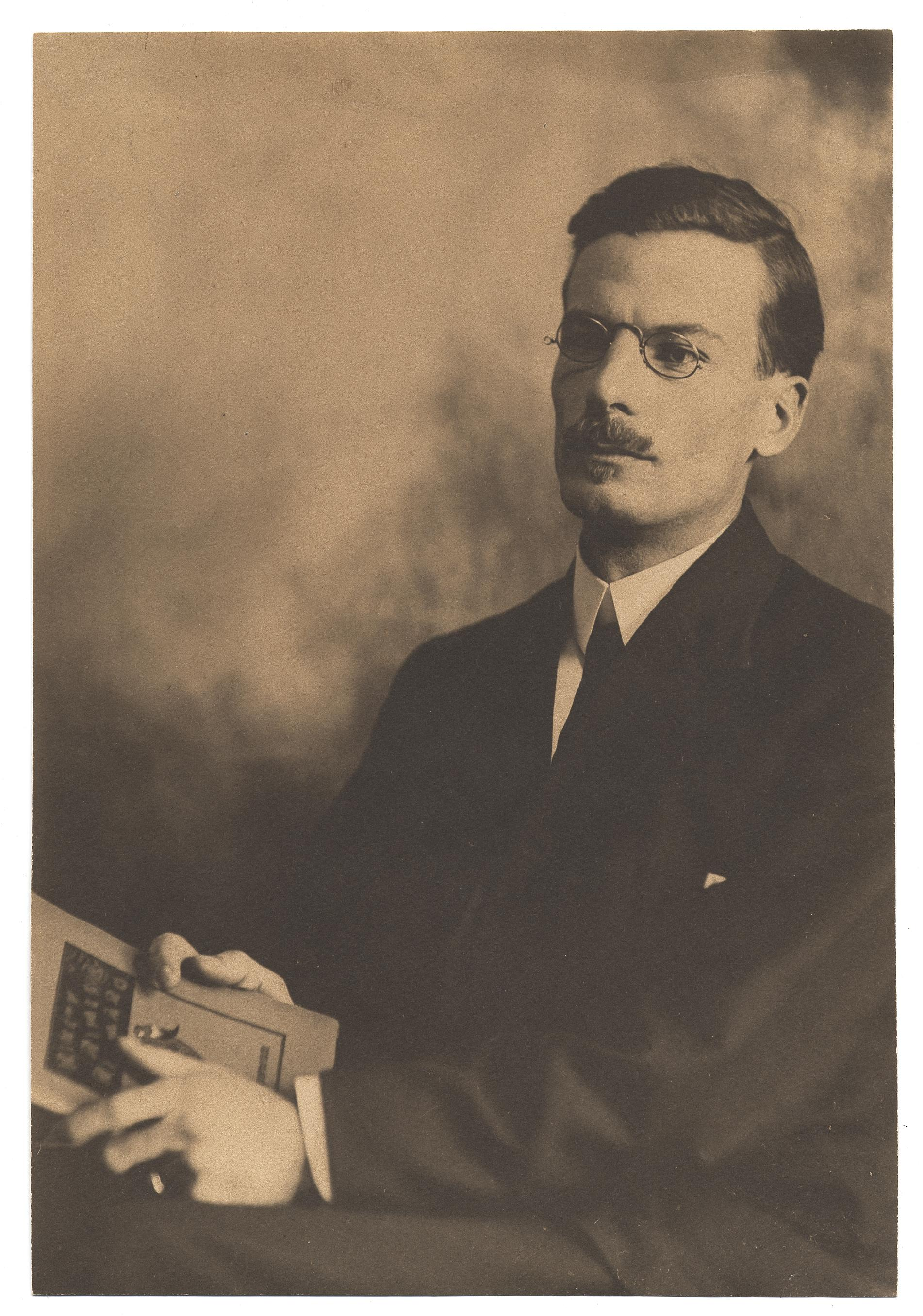
- Portrait photograph of Kenneth Hayes Miller, c.1910
- Born: March 11, 1876
- Died: January 1, 1952 (aged 75)

Kenneth Hayes Miller (March 11, 1876 – January 1, 1952) was an American painter, printmaker, and teacher.

== Career ==
Born in Oneida, New York, he studied at the Art Students League of New York with Kenyon Cox, Henry Siddons Mowbray and with William Merritt Chase at the New York School of Art. His early works were influenced by the paintings of his friend Albert Pinkham Ryder, and depict figures in phantasmagorical landscapes.

After 1920 Miller became interested in the underpainting-and-glazing techniques of the old masters, which he employed in painting contemporary scenes. He is especially noted for his many paintings of women shopping in department stores. The art historian M. Sue Kendall says: "In their classical poses and formalized compositions, Miller’s shoppers become ovoid and columnar forms in cloche hats and chokers, a study of geometricized volumes in space trying to inhabit a single shallow picture plane." Active as a printmaker throughout his career, Miller created many etchings, some of which reproduce his painted compositions. His work was part of the painting event in the art competition at the 1936 Summer Olympics.

Although he used traditional methods and was hostile to artistic modernism, Miller believed that good art is always radical in nature. He was a socialist, and intended his art to have a political dimension.

By the time of his death in New York City in 1952, his reputation was in eclipse, but he was rediscovered in the 1970s.

== Students ==
Miller taught at the Art Students League from 1911 until 1951. His students include: Peggy Bacon, George Bellows, Isabel Bishop, Arnold Blanch, Patrick Henry Bruce, Minna Citron, John McCrady, Thelma Cudlipp, Horace Day, Dorothy Eaton, Arnold Friedman, Lloyd Goodrich, Josephine Hopper, Rockwell Kent, Yasuo Kuniyoshi, Anne Kutka McCosh, Emma Fordyce MacRae, Edward Middleton Manigault, Reginald Marsh, George L.K. Morris, Walter Tandy Murch, Louise Emerson Ronnebeck, George Tooker, Russel Wright, Albert Pels, William C. Palmer, Molly Luce, and Helen Winslow Durkee.

== Public collections ==
Collections where his works can be found include:

- Metropolitan Museum of Art, New York, New York
- Columbus Museum of Art, Columbus, Ohio
- Whitney Museum of American Art, New York, New York
- Georgia Museum of Art, Athens, GA
- Heckscher Museum of Art, Huntington, New York
- Phillips Collection, Washington, District of Columbia
- New Jersey State Museum, Trenton, New Jersey
- Los Angeles County Museum of Art, Los Angeles, California
- Wadsworth Atheneum, Hartford, Connecticut
- Art Gallery of Hamilton, Hamilton, Ontario, Canada
- New Britain Museum of American Art, New Britain, Connecticut
- Butler Institute of American Art, Youngstown, Ohio
- Smithsonian American Art Museum, Washington, District of Columbia
- Huntington Library, Art Collections and Botanical Gardens, San Marino, California
- Wichita Art Museum, Wichita, Kansas
- Smithsonian Institution, Hirshhorn Museum and Sculpture Garden, Washington, District of Columbia
- Speed Art Museum, Louisville, Kentucky
