= Ticknor =

Ticknor, a variant spelling of Tickner, is a topographic surname of English origin for someone who lived at a crossroad or a fork in the road. Notable people with the surname include:

- Anna Eliot Ticknor (1823–1896), American author and educator
- Ben Ticknor (1909–1979), American football player
- Duane Ticknor, assistant basketball coach for the Sacramento Kings
- Elisha Ticknor (1757–1821), educator and merchant, father of Boston author George Ticknor
- Francis Orray Ticknor, country doctor, poet, and man of letters
- George Ticknor (1791–1871), American academician and Hispanist
- George Ticknor (journalist) (1822–1866), lawyer, and later a journalist
- George Ticknor Curtis (1812–1894), American author, writer, historian and lawyer
- William Ticknor (1810–1864), American publisher in Boston, Massachusetts, USA
  - Ticknor and Fields, American publishing company based in Boston, Massachusetts
- William Davis Ticknor, Sr. (1881–1938), American businessman

== See also ==
- Tichenor
- Amory-Ticknor House, historic house in Boston, Massachusetts
- Dr. Benajah Ticknor House, historical museum in Ann Arbor Michigan
