= Western Massachusetts Regional Library System =

Regional library system of Western Massachusetts, U.S.

- Abbreviation: WMRLS
- Dissolved: 2017
- Region served: Western Massachusetts
- Website: http://www.wmrls.org/

The Western Massachusetts Regional Library System (WMRLS), was a collaborative that was supported by the state of Massachusetts, that provided leadership and services to foster cooperation, communication, and sharing among member libraries of all types in western Massachusetts, U.S. WMRLS assisted member libraries in promoting access to services. It ceased operations on June 30, 2010 as part of a statewide merger of regional library services into a single entity (Massachusetts Library System, or MLS). WMRLS existed in a state of dormancy from 2010-2017. The WMRLS corporation was dissolved in 2017.

== Overview ==
Membership in WMRLS was open to any library within western Massachusetts that met the basic requirements set by the Massachusetts Board of Library Commissioners (MBLC). There was no charge for membership.

WMRLS was governed by a Council of Members representing the Region's member libraries. The annual operating budget and Plan of Service were approved by the Council of Members and the Massachusetts Board of Library Commissioners.

There were six regional library systems in Massachusetts. All were administered by the MBLC. When the other regional entities voted to merge to form the Massachusetts Library System in 2010, WMRLS went into dormancy.

Proposals to cut funding for WMRLS as of July 1, 2010 were reported on in the Greenfield Recorder.

== History ==
Regional library service in Massachusetts began in 1940 when three Regional Library Centers were established. One in Pittsfield served 37 towns in rural Berkshire County; one in Greenfield served 37 towns in rural Franklin and Hampshire Counties; and one in Fall River served 18 towns in southeastern Massachusetts. The Centers were administered by the state Division of Library Extension and funded for the first two years with money from the Works Progress Administration (WPA). The state assumed funding responsibility in 1942.

Between 1940 and 1953 each Center occupied rent-free quarters in its host library, located in Pittsfield, Greenfield, or Fall River. Operating from each Center was a bookmobile, donated by the Massachusetts State Federation of Women's Clubs, Massachusetts Library Aid Association, and Massachusetts Library Association. Staffing consisted of a professional librarian, driver/clerk, and office assistant. Bookmobile service was provided to local libraries, school and deposit stations located at homes in outlying areas, post offices, gasoline stations, and general stores. Each bookmobile was supported with a 12,000-volume book collection.

The WMRLS was formally organized in 1962.

== Problems ==
Three major weaknesses in the Regional Library Center program were identified soon after its formation:

- Service areas were too large to be served by one bookmobile (which took six weeks to visit each location)
- The 12,000-volume book collection did not provide sufficient materials for the population of the service area
- Consulting services provided by the professional bookmobile librarian to local libraries were very limited because of the number of libraries served.

A study completed in 1944 recognized that library support in small towns would always be limited because of the narrow tax base. To address this, the study recommended that the Centers be strengthened, that other types of coordinated services be provided, and that additional state funding be made available to equalize library services where inequalities existed. Between 1945 and 1948, the Massachusetts Library Association tried to win legislative support for a plan to improve library services as recommended by the study, but no plan evolved.
