= Timeline of women in library science =

This is a timeline of women in library science throughout the world.

== 18th century ==
1796: Cecilia Cleve became the first female librarian in Sweden.

== 19th century ==
1852: The first female clerk was hired for the Boston Public Library.

1858: The first female library clerk was appointed to the Smithsonian Institution in 1858, and was also the Smithsonian's first female employee.

1880: Mary Foy became the first woman head librarian of the Los Angeles Public Library.

1890: Elizabeth Putnam Sohier and Anna Eliot Ticknor became the first women appointed to a United States state library agency—specifically, the Massachusetts Board of Library Commissioners.

== 20th century ==
1911: Theresa Elmendorf became the first female president of the American Library Association.

1912: Lillian Helena Smith became the first trained children's librarian in Canada.

1916: Margaret Duncan became one of the first librarians, and later director, at the Clearwater Public Library in Clearwater, Florida. During World War I, Duncan became the Pinellas County Director for the American Library Association in the United War Campaign.

1921: Alice Dugged Cary served as the first nonprofessional librarian and branch head of the Auburn Branch of the Carnegie Library, the first branch to serve Atlanta's African American citizens under segregation.

1921: Pura Belpré became the first Puerto Rican librarian to be hired by the New York Public Library System.

1923: Virginia Proctor Powell Florence became the first black woman in the United States to earn a degree in library science. She earned the degree (Bachelor of Library Science) from what is now part of the University of Pittsburgh.

1940: Eliza Atkins Gleason became the first black American to earn a doctorate in library science, which she did at the University of Chicago.

1946: Mary Ellinor Lucy Archer became the first Chief Librarian of the CSIRO (Commonwealth Scientific and Industrial Research Organisation) in Australia.

1947: Freda Farrell Waldon became the first president of the Canadian Library Association, and thus, as she was female, its first female president.

1949: Christine Wigfall Morris became the first African American to work as a librarian in Clearwater, Florida. She later became the director of the "Negro Library", which opened in 1950.

1963: Shanti Mishra became the first Nepali female librarian. She was appointed as the chief librarian in Tribhuvan University Central Library, after returning from the United States with a Master of Arts in library science. She was the first female librarian of Tribhuvan University Central Library.

1963: Marianne Scott was the first president of the Canadian Association of Law Libraries, which became a formal association on July 5, 1963.

1970: Clara Stanton Jones became the first woman (and the first African American) to serve as director of a major library system in America, as director of the Detroit Public Library.

1970: The American Library Association's Social Responsibilities Round Table Feminist Task Force (FTF) was founded in 1970 by women who wished to address sexism in libraries and librarianship.

1971: Effie Lee Morris became the first woman and black person to serve as president of the Public Library Association.

1972: Zoia Horn, born in Ukraine, became the first United States librarian to be jailed for refusing to share information as a matter of conscience (and, as she was female, the first female United States librarian to do so.)

1973: Page Ackerman became University Librarian for the University of California, Los Angeles, and thus became the United States' first female librarian of a system as large and complex as UCLA's.

1976: Mary Ronnie became the first female national librarian in the world, due to becoming New Zealand's first female National Librarian.

1976: The Council of the American Library Association passed a "Resolution on Racism and Sexism Awareness" during the ALA's Centennial Conference in Chicago, July 18–24, 1976.

1976: The Committee on the Status of Women in Librarianship (COSWL) of the American Library Association was founded in 1976.

1978: Margaret Shaw was appointed as the first Chief Librarian of the National Gallery of Australia Research Library.

1985: Susan Luévano-Molina became the first female president of REFORMA.

1993: Jennifer Tanfield became the first female Librarian of the House of Commons of the United Kingdom.

1999: Elisabeth Niggemann became the first female director general of the German National Library.

== 21st century ==
2000: Lynne Brindley was appointed as the first female chief executive of the British Library.

2002: Inez Lynn was appointed as the first female librarian in the London Library's history.

2004: Anjana Chattopadhyay became the first Director of the National Medical Library in India.

2009: Anne Jarvis became the first female librarian in Cambridge University's 650-year history.

2012: Sonia L'Heureux became the first female Parliamentary Librarian of Canada.

2016: Laurence Engel became the first female head of the French National Library.

2016: Carla Hayden became the first female Librarian of Congress.

2019: Leslie Weir became the first female Librarian and Archivist of Canada.

== Additional Sources ==
- Chou, Rose L. (Editor) and Annie Pho (Editor). (2018). Pushing the Margins: Women of Color and Intersectionality in LIS. Sacramento CA: Library Juice Press.
- Grotzinger, Laurel A. (1983). "Biographical Research on Women Librarians" in The Status of Women in Librarianship: Historical Sociological and Economic Issues.ed., Kathleen M. Heim. New York N.Y: Neal-Schuman.
- Hildenbrand, Suzanne. (1996). Reclaiming the American Library Past: Writing the Women In. Norwood N.J: Ablex Pub.
- Kaur, Rajwant. (2013). Women Librarians in India: A Study in Work-Life Balance. 2013. New Delhi: Ess Ess Publications.
- Maack, Mary Niles. (1983). “Women Librarians in France: The First Generation.” The Journal of Library History (1974-1987) 407–49.
- Maack, Mary Niles and Joanne Ellen Passet. (1994). Aspirations and Mentoring in an Academic Environment : Women Faculty in Library and Information Science. Westport Conn: Greenwood Press.
- Myers, Margaret and Mayra Scarborough and Rutgers University Graduate School of Library Service. (1975). Women in Librarianship : Melvil’s Rib Symposium : Proceedings of the Eleventh Annual Symposium Sponsored by the Alumni and Faculty of the Rutgers University Graduate School of Library Service. New Brunswick N.J: Bureau of Library and Information Science Research Rutgers University Graduate School of Library Service.
- Weibel, Kathleen, Kathleen M. Heim and Dianne J. Ellsworth. (1979) The Role of Women in Librarianship 1876-1976: The Entry, Advancement and Struggle for Equalization in One Profession. Phoenix Ariz: Oryx Press.
