= Massachusetts Library System =

- Formation: 2010; 16 years ago
- Type: Nonprofit
- Location: Massachusetts, US
- Executive Director: Sarah Sogigian
- Website: masslibsystem.org

The Massachusetts Library System (MLS) is an American library consortium formed in 2010. The MLS provides the following core services to about 1,500 libraries of all types and sizes located throughout Massachusetts: consulting, training and professional development, cooperative purchasing, research and development, summer library program, and resource sharing. As part of resource sharing, the MLS provides delivery, mediated interlibrary loan, journal article document delivery, MassCat shared catalog, and electronic content, including statewide databases and ebooks in collaboration with the Massachusetts Board of Library Commissioners. It operates from offices in Marlborough and Northampton, Massachusetts.

The entity was formed "to consolidate the services of six former regional library systems:" Boston Regional Library System, Central Massachusetts Regional Library System, MetroWest Regional Library System, Northeast Massachusetts Regional Library System, Southeastern Massachusetts Library System, and Western Massachusetts Regional Library System.

During its formation by the Massachusetts legislature in spring 2010, the statewide system received mixed support. The Massachusetts Library Association, for example, opposed aspects of the consolidation of regional systems, claiming service would suffer.

According to its website, the Massachusetts Library System's "services are provided through state funds administered by the Massachusetts Board of Library Commissioners," a state agency. The executive board consists of representatives from public libraries, public and private schools and colleges, and libraries of private organizations.

== See also ==
- List of public libraries in Massachusetts
