= Elizabeth Putnam =

Elizabeth Putnam may refer to:

- Elizabeth Putnam (figure skater) (born 1984), Canadian competitive figure skater
- Elizabeth Cushman Titus Putnam (born 1933), American conservationist and founder of the Student Conservation Association
- Elizabeth Lowell Putnam (1862–1935), American philanthropist and activist for prenatal care
- Elizabeth Putnam Sohier (1847–1926), a member of Boston's wealthy class, librarian, and library advocate
