= Central Massachusetts Regional Library System =

Central Massachusetts Regional Library System was a multitype library system serving 244 academic, public, school and special libraries in 72 central Massachusetts communities. It was one of six Massachusetts Regional Library Systems. Collectively, CMRLS libraries serve 924,491 people who live, work or study in Central Massachusetts. Founded in 1963, the library system began as a unit within the City of Worcester, Massachusetts municipal government and served public libraries exclusively. In 1997 it became a multitype, independent non-profit organization working with all types of libraries. Nearly all services were provided free of charge, with major funding through a contract with the Commonwealth of Massachusetts administered by the Massachusetts Board of Library Commissioners. Due to the collapse of state funding, it was merged along with four other Massachusetts Regional Library Systems into the Massachusetts Library System on July 1, 2010.

== Purpose ==
The Central Massachusetts Regional Library System promoted and supported resource sharing, professional development, collaboration, and innovation among all types of libraries in Central Massachusetts. Its services strengthened member libraries and staff, creating a collaborative network that is essential to a high quality and accessible continuum of library services for those who live, work, or study in the region.

Public libraries typically receive less than 2% of municipal funding. Academic libraries fare better, but school libraries much worse. The Central Massachusetts Regional Library System helped libraries to use their resources more effectively and serve their clientele better than they could alone. Its vision was to "create synergy among libraries to enrich the quality of life in Central Massachusetts."

Its capacity building and system development activities were grouped into three categories: resource sharing and collection support; reference services and support; staff and program development.

In addition, the library system also ran a temporary staffing service called BiblioTemps, which was suspended in May 2010 and restored by its successor, the Massachusetts Library System, in 2012.
