= Marian Frost =

British female chief librarian (1876–1935)

Marian Frost (27 September 1876 – 27 December 1935) was an English librarian. She was instrumental in the expansion of the Worthing Library and was the first female chief librarian in the UK, with an all-female staff.

== Family ==
Frost was born in the UK to textile chemist and mayor of Macclesfield, William Frost (died 1934). She never married.

== Expansion of the Worthing Library ==
The Worthing Library, at the time of Frost's first hiring in 1901, was a small library with a rapidly growing readership that was outgrowing its "overcrowded and dilapidated building". Frost wrote to American philanthropist Andrew Carnegie in 1902 to request funding to rebuild the library and improve its offerings for its patrons. After being denied for years, Frost succeeded in convincing Carnegie to donate £6,200 to fund the construction of the new building, provided the town council provide the building site free of charge. Work on this building began in 1907, and it was open by December of the next year.

Frost became chief librarian of the Worthing Library in 1919, and was likely the first female head librarian in the UK. She is also noted as being the first female librarian to run an all-female staff. Frost expanded the library services to also include a children's library and a special collection preserving novels with a particular connection to Sussex county. After Frost died, the following chief librarian Ethel Gerard continued the legacy of extending the library service.

== Later career ==
Frost continued to work as chief librarian and curator of the Public Library, Art Gallery, and Museum at Worthing for the rest of her life. Over her career, Frost became president of the London and Home Counties Library Association and vice-president of the Museum Association. She published a book on local history, The Early History of Worthing: Being an Account of the Chief Events from Pre-Historic Times to a Century Ago. Frost was also the Honorary Secretary of the Sussex Archeological Society and a founding member of the Worthing Archeological Society, founded in 1922. In her role as museum curator, head librarian, and amateur archeologist, Frost participated in numerous archeological digs, including the Blackpatch Flint Mine Excavation in 1922. In 1927, Frost gave a lecture calling for photographic archiving of the town of Worthing as it stood then, before more changes to the town caused older buildings and other structures to be forgotten. Two collections of photographs were created and displayed at the Worthing Library.

In 1935, Frost received one of the first diplomas offered by the Museums Association. She was also elected president of the Worthing Archeological Society in this year. Frost died in 1935 at age 59 due to a heart condition.

== See also ==
- Timeline of women in library science
