= Park Street District =

Historic district in Boston, Massachusetts

- U.S. National Register of Historic Places
- U.S. Historic district
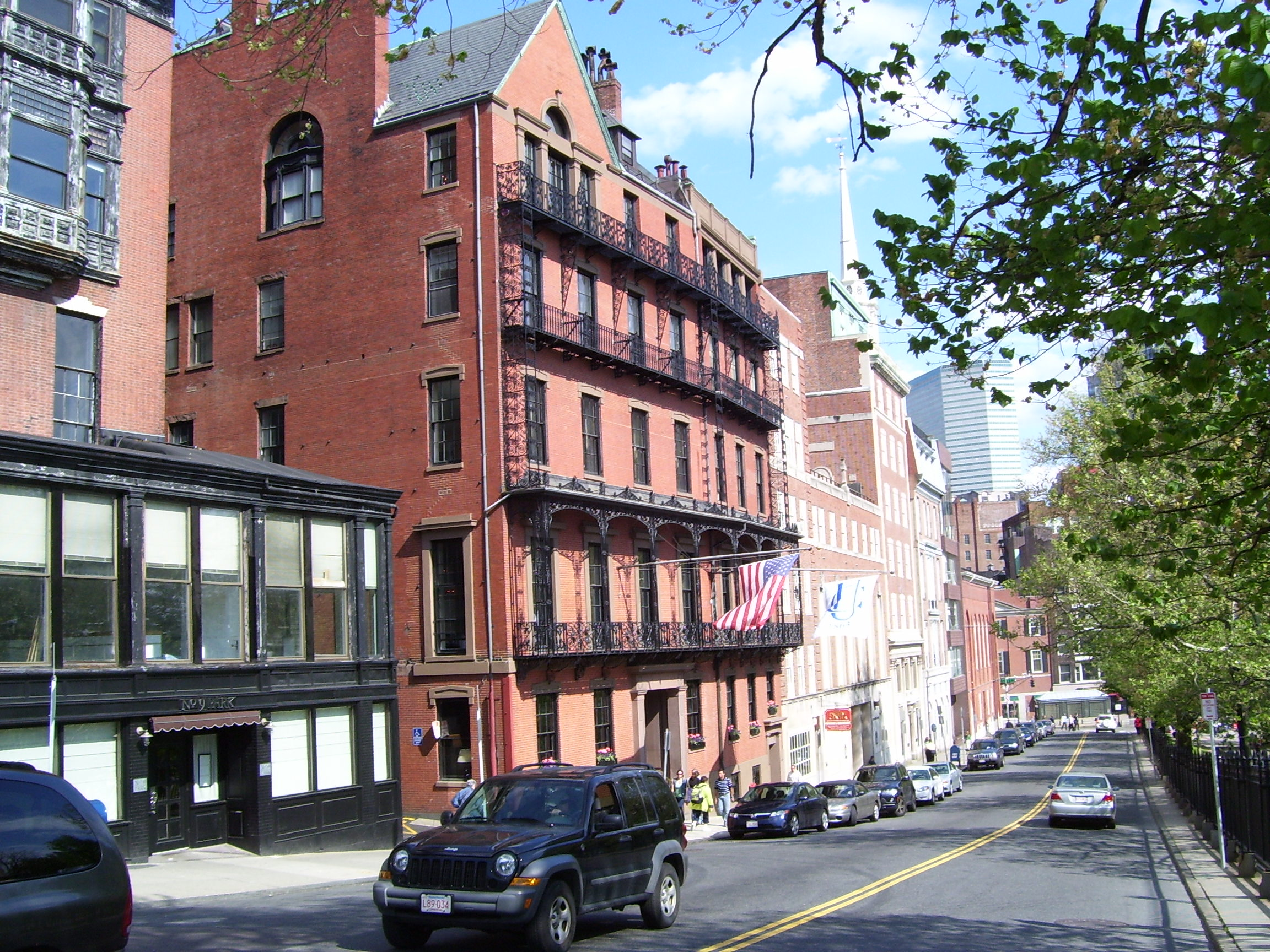
- Park Street from near the Massachusetts State House. No. 9 Park is on the left

- Location within Boston Location within Massachusetts Location within the United States
- Location: Boston, Massachusetts
- Coordinates: 42°21′26″N 71°3′44″W
- Built: 1660
- Architect: Bulfinch, Charles; Et al.
- Architectural style: Exotic Revival, Federal
- NRHP reference No.: 74000390
- Added to NRHP: May 1, 1974

The Park Street District is a historic district encompassing a small cluster of historic properties on or near Park Street in the heart of Boston, Massachusetts. The district covers an entire city block delineated by Park Street, Beacon Street, School Street, and Tremont Street, just east of the Boston Common. The district reflects an early design of the area by architect Charles Bulfinch, although only a few buildings from his period survive.

The Amory–Ticknor House (1804), Chester Harding House (1808), Boston Athenæum (1847), Congregational Library & Archives (1898), Park Street Church (1807), Granary Burying Ground (1660) and Suffolk University Law School (1999) are all within the district. The district was added to the National Register of Historic Places in 1974.

== See also ==
- National Register of Historic Places listings in northern Boston, Massachusetts

== Images ==
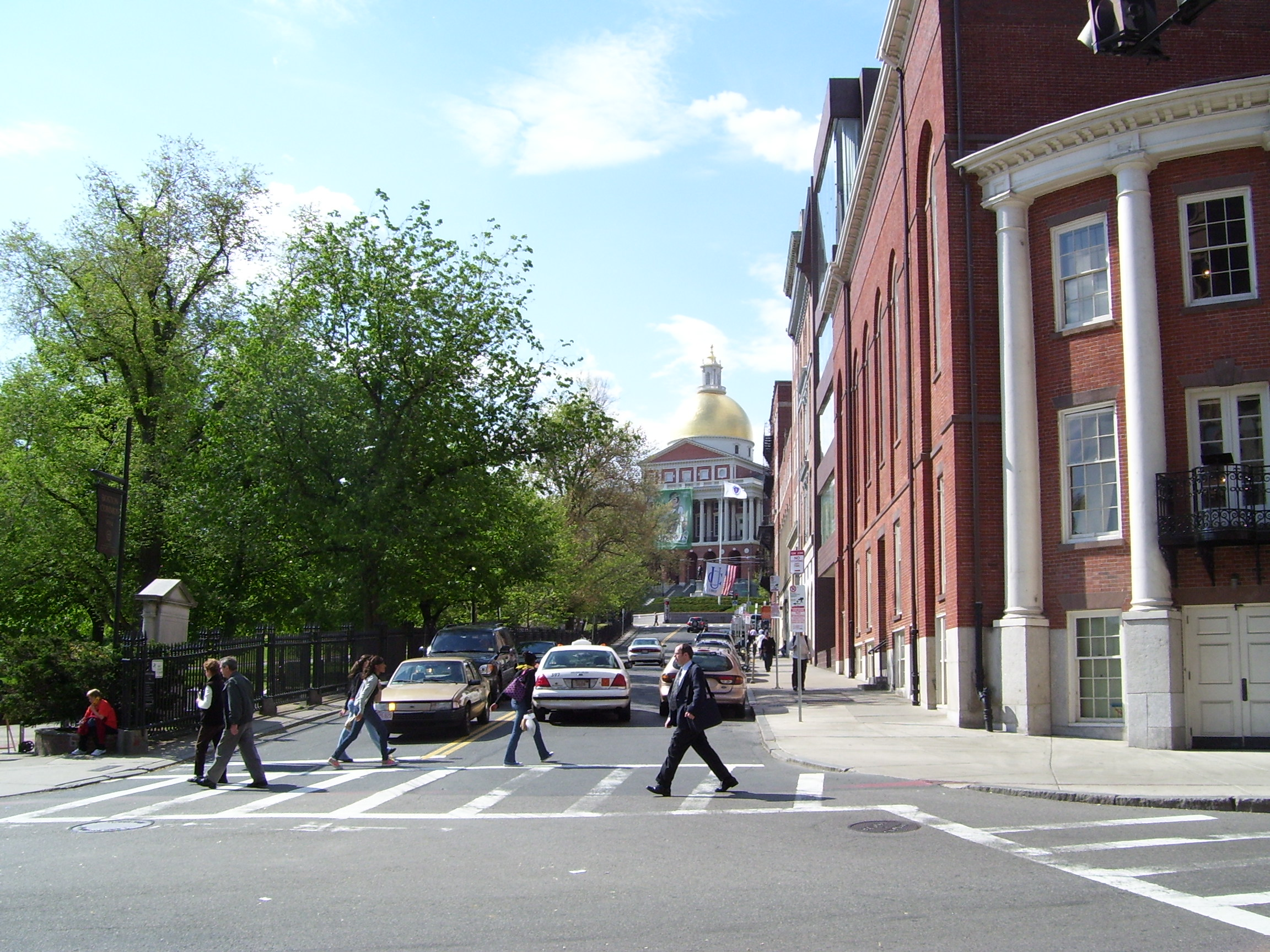
Park Street., from near Suffolk Law School, looking at Park Street Church (right), Boston Common (left), and Massachusetts State House (background)

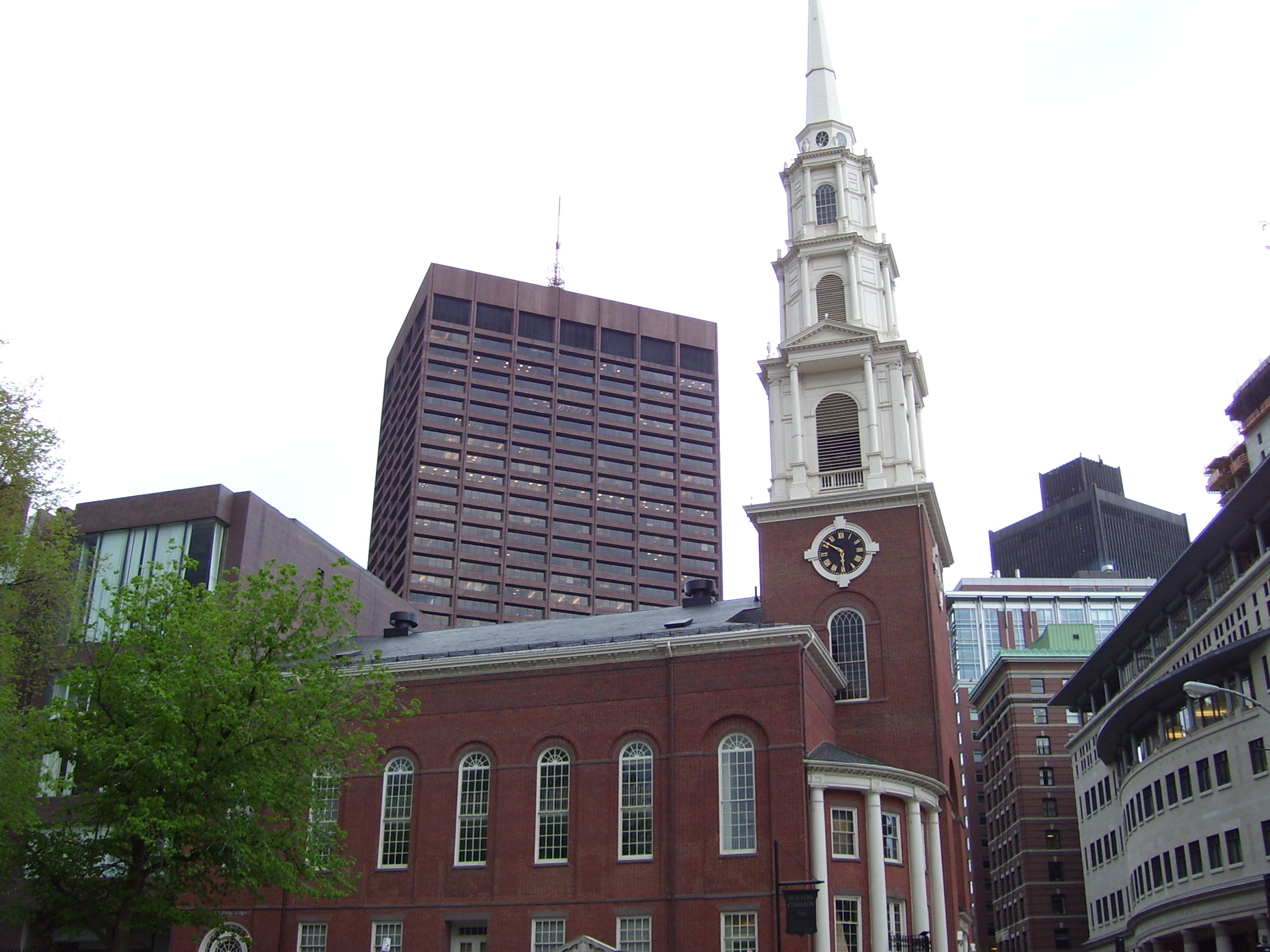
Park Street Church.

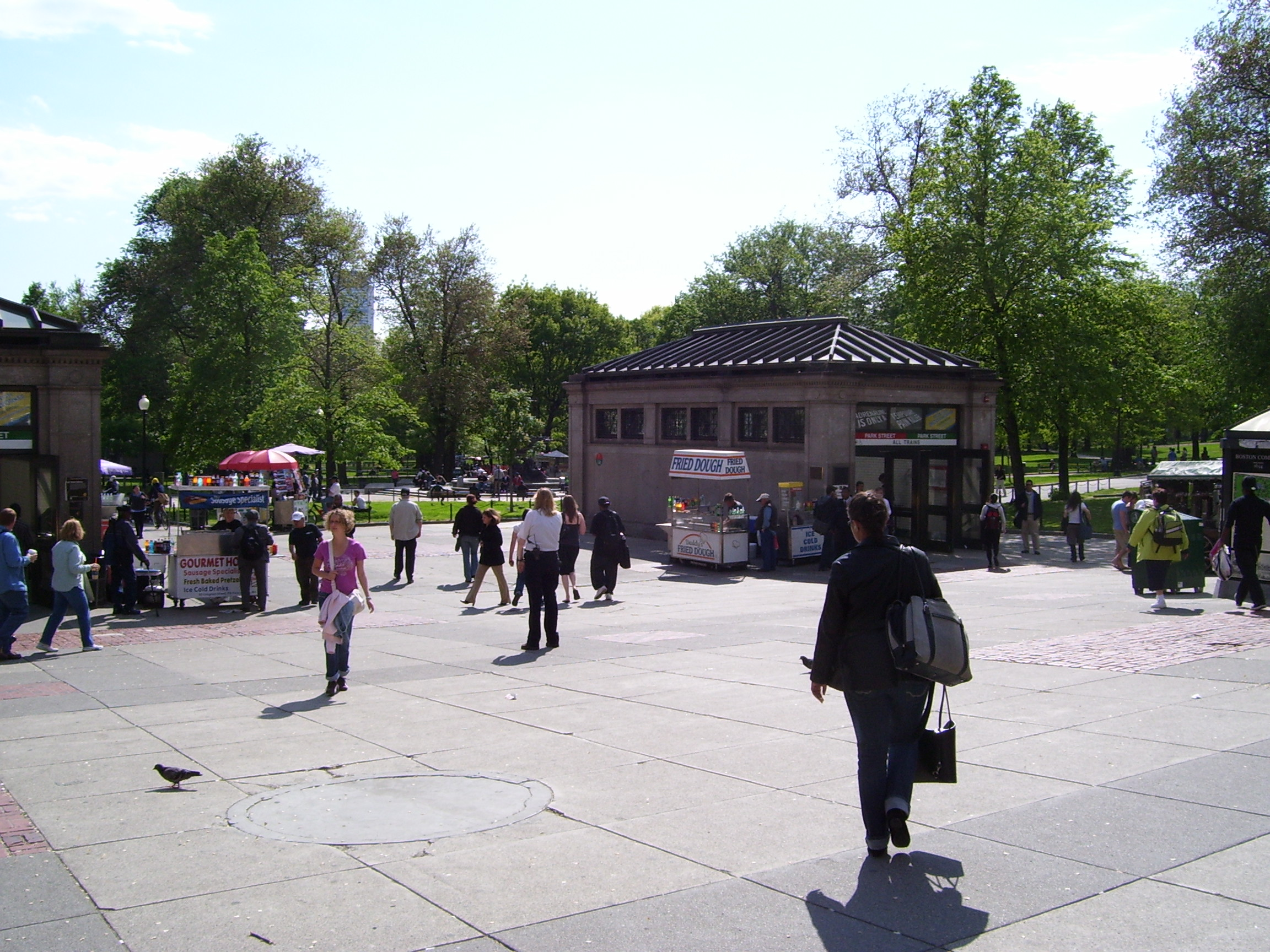
Park Street (MBTA station), oldest subway station in the U.S.
