= Park Street (Boston) =

Road in Boston, Massachusetts

Coordinates: 42°21′26.53″N 71°3′46.35″W

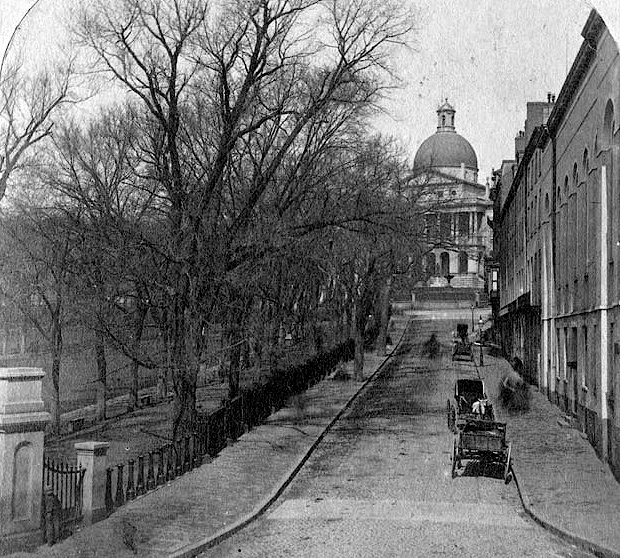
- Park Street, Boston, 19th-century Boston Common (at left), Massachusetts State House (at top)
- Interactive map of Park Street
- Location: Boston
- South end: Tremont Street
- North end: Beacon Street

Park Street is a short, historic road in the center of Boston, Massachusetts. It begins at the top of Beacon Hill, at the intersection of Beacon Street, where it is lined up with the front of the Massachusetts State House. It then spills down the hill toward Tremont Street, with Boston Common to its west.

== History ==
Park Street was laid out in 1804, initially as Park Place, replacing the previous Sentry Street.

In the 1880s, the feminist Woman's Journal was published on Park Street. Houghton Mifflin was also headquartered here beginning in the late 19th century.

== Gallery ==
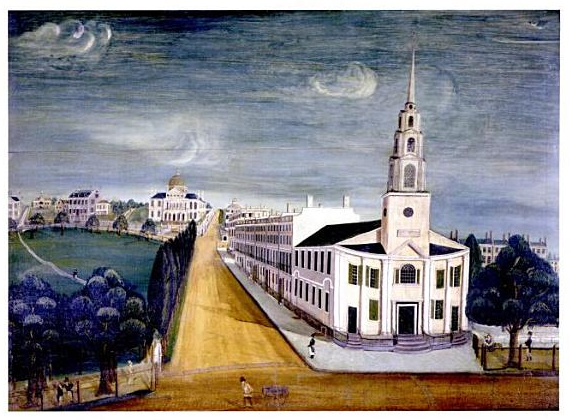
Park St., c. 1815; Park Street Congregational Church (at right), Hancock mansion (in distance across Common, at upper left)

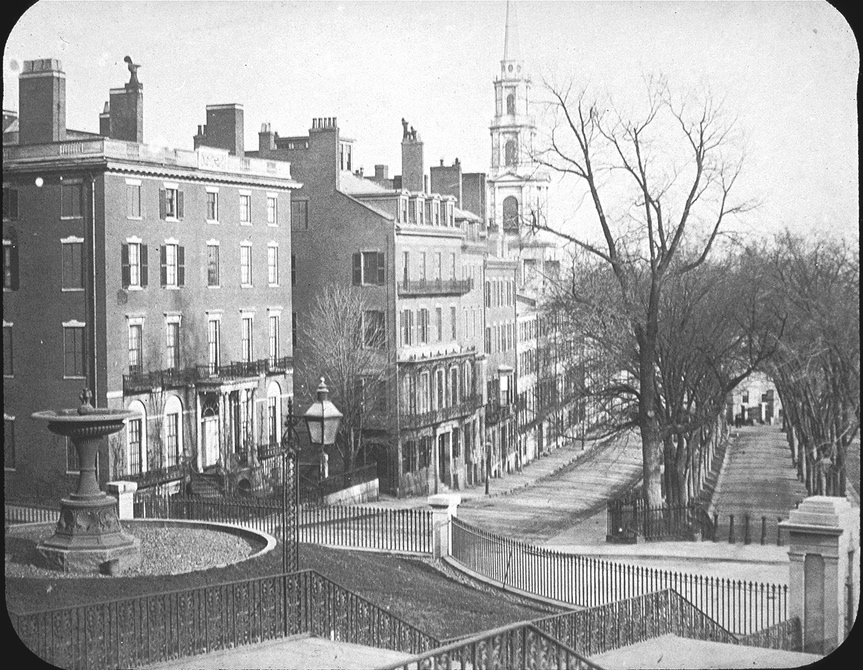
Park St., c. 1860, looking towards Tremont St.; Amory Ticknor house (on left, behind fountain)

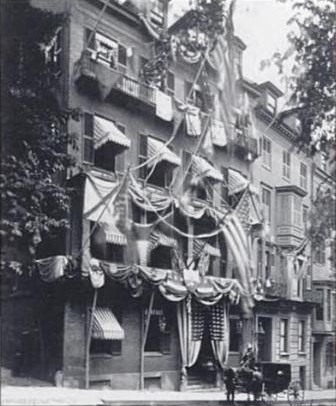
Union Club, Park St., 1875

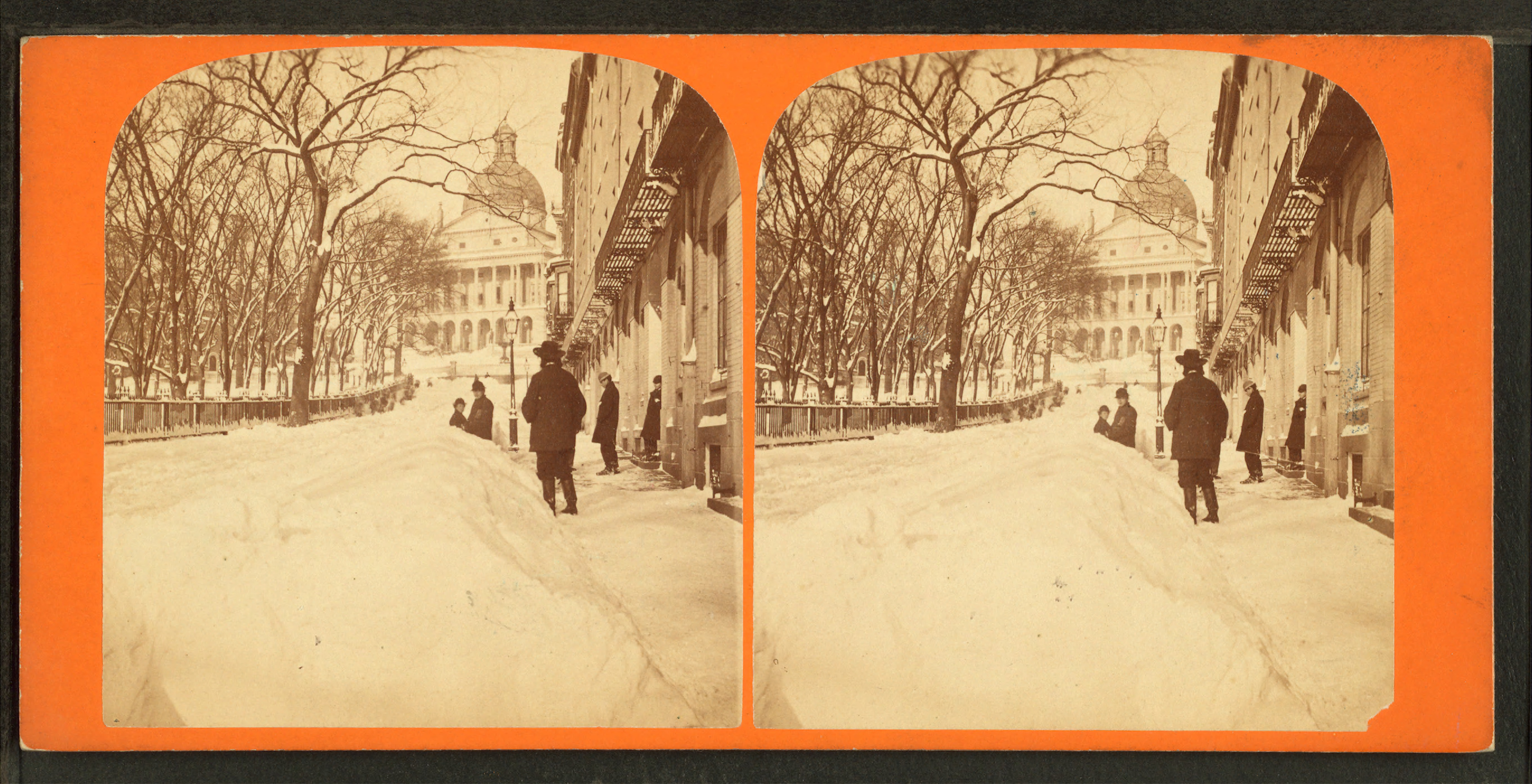
Winter scene, 19th century

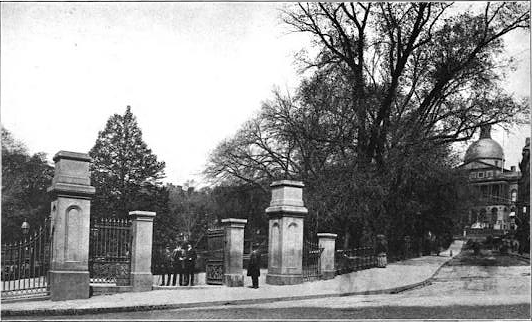
Park St. gate, Boston Common, 19th century

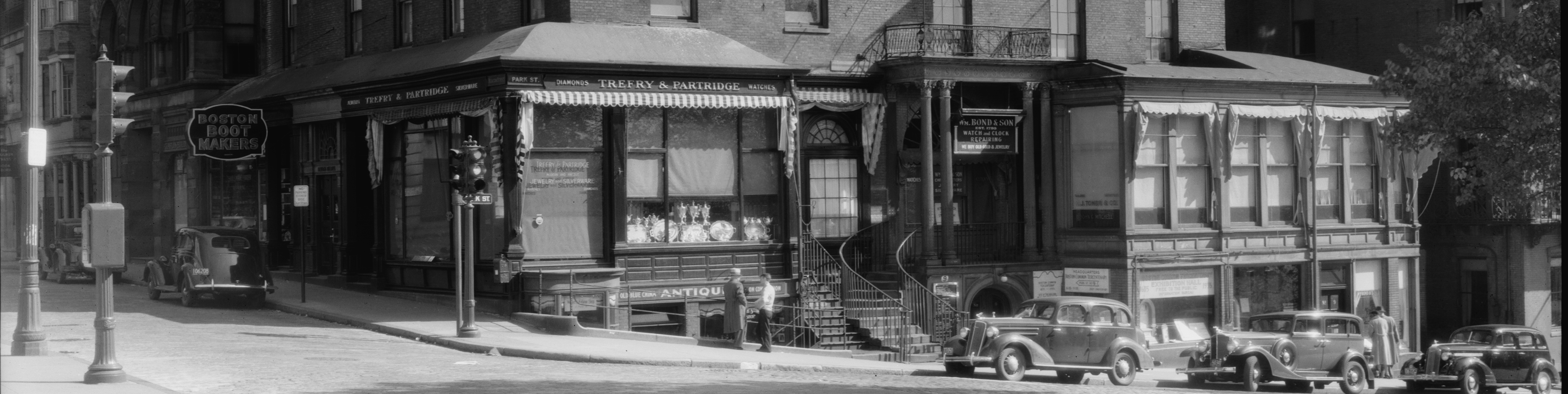
Amory Ticknor house, 1935, at corner of Beacon St. and Park St.

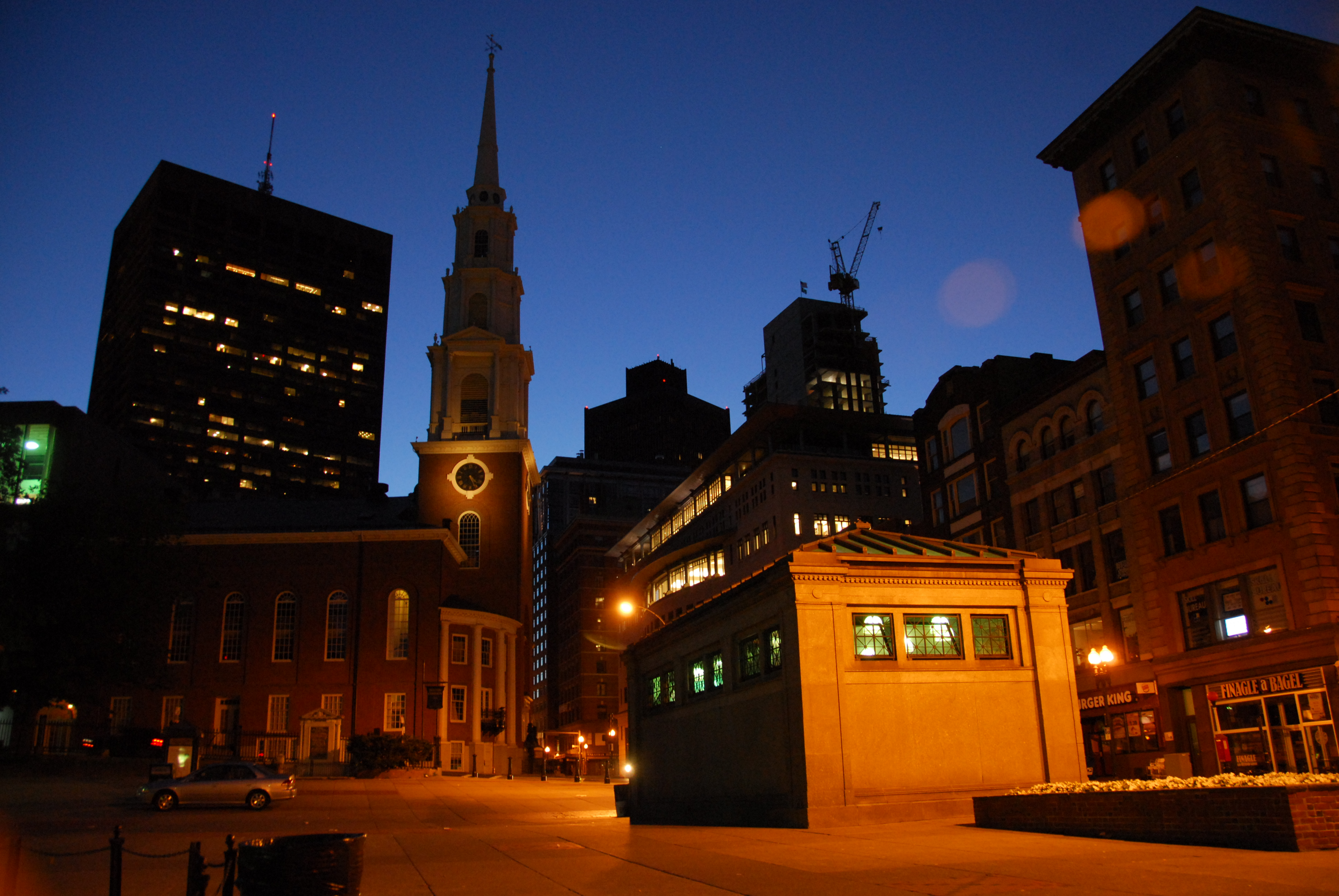
Corner of Park and Tremont Streets, Boston, 2008

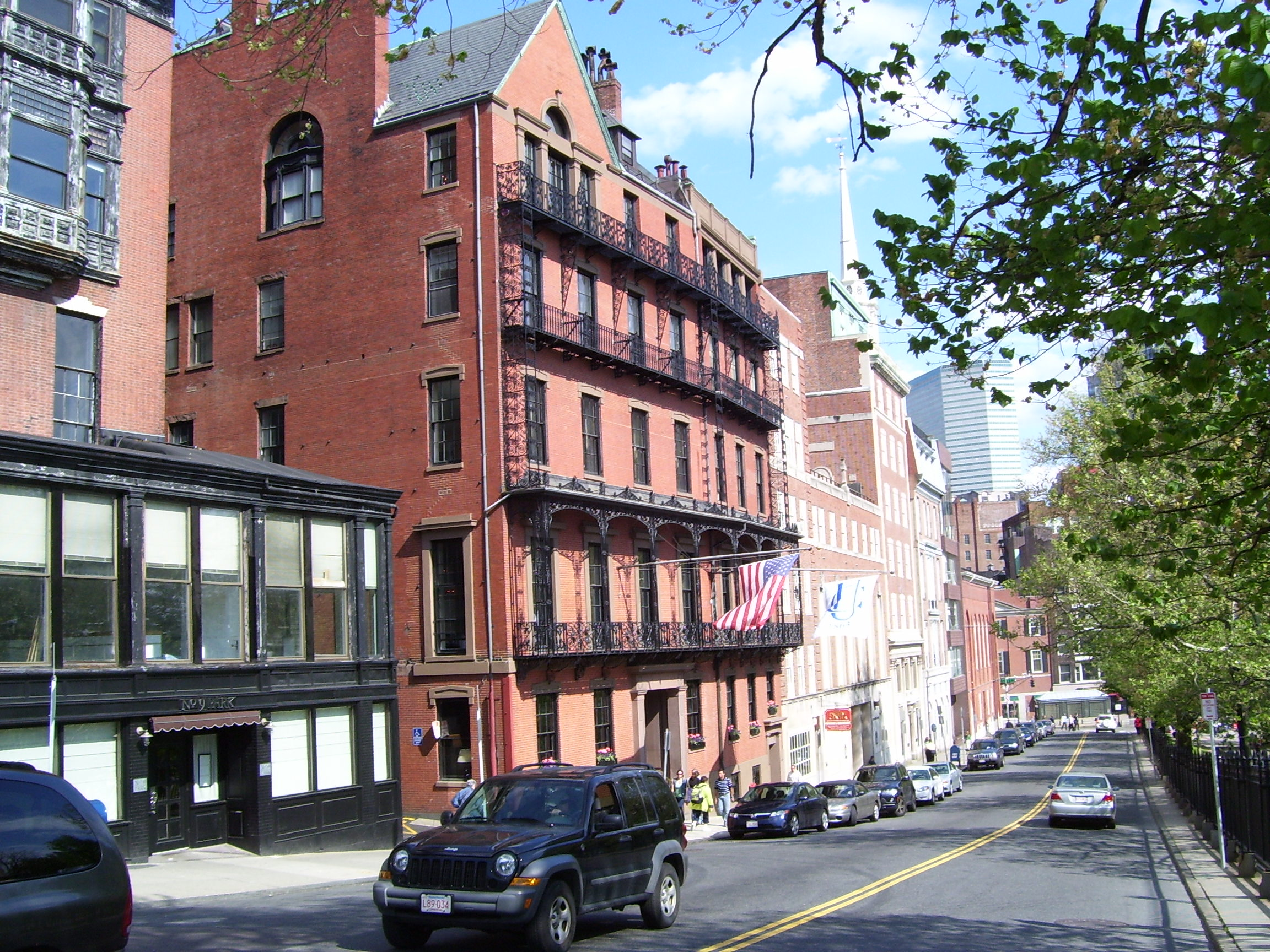
Park Street looking from near the Massachusetts State House, 2008

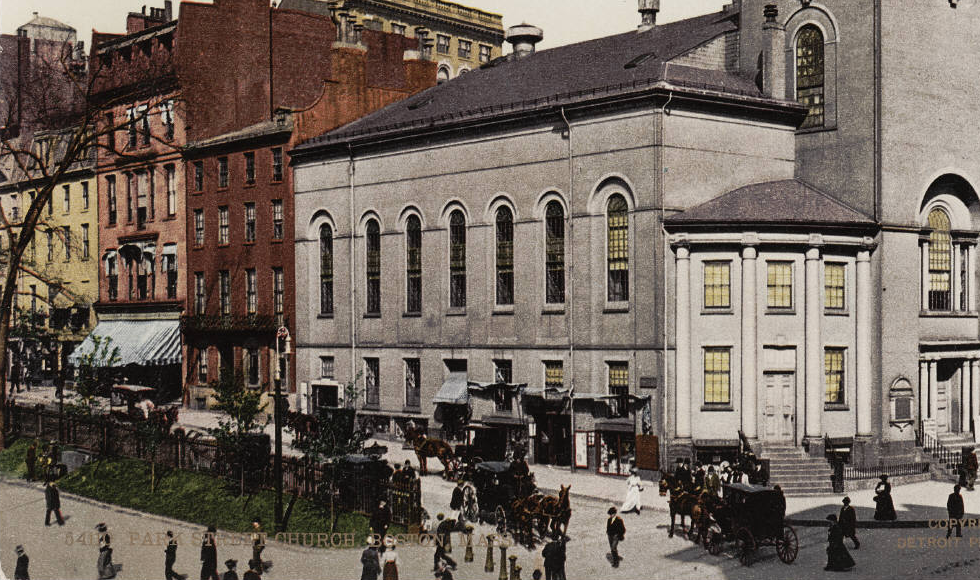
1904 Park St Boston

== See also ==
- Park Street District
- Boston Common
- The Massachusetts State House
- Park Street Church
- Park Street (MBTA station), the first subway station in the United States, is located at the corner of Park and Tremont Streets and is a major transfer point between the Red and Green rapid transit lines.
- No. 9 Park
- Amory-Ticknor House
- Union Club of Boston
- Fox 25 News studios, built to include the State House as its backdrop
- Paulist Center & Chapel
