= Barbara Lynch (restaurateur) =

American restaurateur

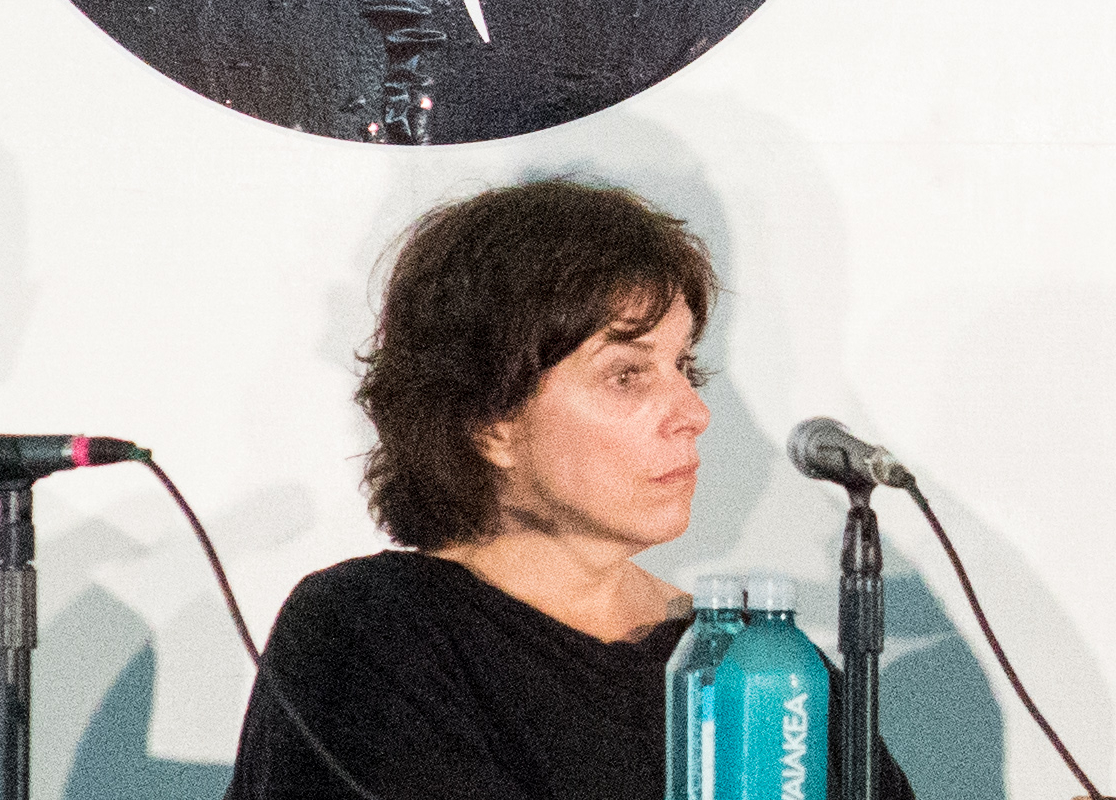
- Lynch in 2015
- Born: South Boston, Massachusetts, U.S.
- Culinary career
- Current restaurants: No. 9 Park, Boston (1998–2024); B&G Oysters, Boston (2003–2024); Butcher Shop, Boston (2003–2024); Stir, Boston (2007–2024); Drink, Boston (2008–2024); Sportello, Boston (2008–2024); Menton, Boston (2010–2024)
- Award won: James Beard Foundation Award for Outstanding Restaurateur

Barbara Lynch is an American restaurateur. In 2017, she was included in Time magazine's "Top 100 Most Influential People of the Year" for her contributions in the culinary world and her focus on local wealth creation through agronomy.

In 2014, she was the second woman to be awarded the James Beard Foundation Award for Outstanding Restaurateur, which honors "a working restaurateur who sets high national standards in restaurant operations and ownership."

== Early life ==
Lynch grew up in South Boston during the era of desegregation busing. She was the youngest of six children raised by a single mother. She was neglected and raped as a child. At 13, she stole an MBTA bus.

That same year, she got her first kitchen job — making meals for the priests in the rectory of the church across from her family's home. It was there, along with inspiration from a home economics teacher, that led her to choose a career as a chef. Lynch did not complete high school. "I figured if I could cook, I’d have a job for the rest of my life."

Lynch started as a waitress at Boston's St. Botolph Club at age 15, which was then led by chef Mario Bonello.

== Career ==
Lynch worked with Todd English, starting in 1989. Lynch has stated she was physically abused by English. In the early 1990s, she accepted her first executive chef's job at Rocco's, an Italian restaurant in Boston's theatre district.

After touring Italy, she returned to Boston and was appointed executive chef at the trattoria Galleria Italiana, and subsequently won Food & Wine's “Ten Best New Chefs in America” award.

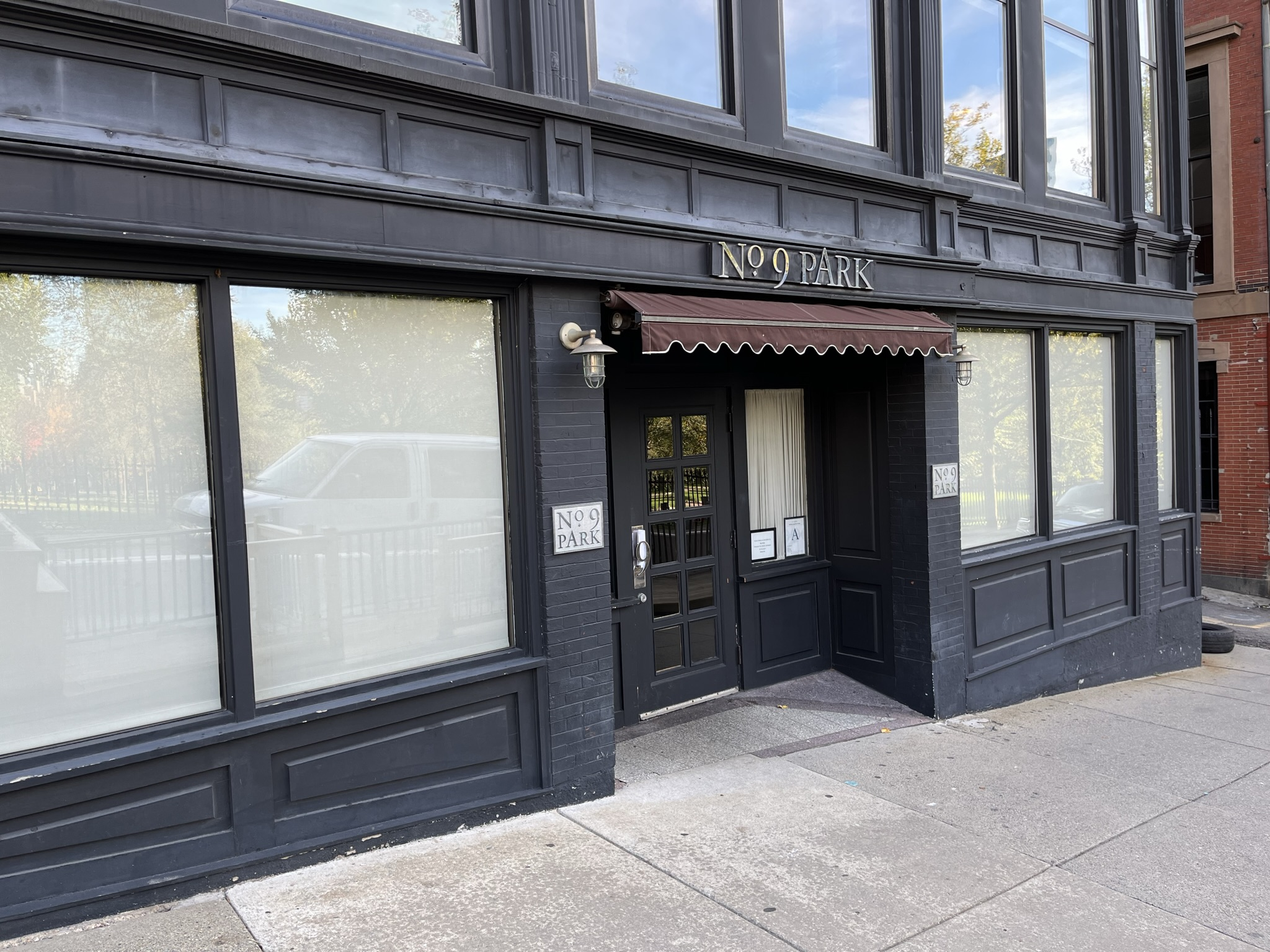
No. 9 Park overlooked Boston Common

In 1998, she opened her first restaurant, No. 9 Park, near the Boston Common and Massachusetts State House.

In 2006, Lynch opened a produce store called Plum Produce on Waltham Street in Boston's South End.

The Barbara Lynch Gruppo employs around 220 people and grosses about $20 million annually. Lynch oversees a catering company and several popular restaurants: No. 9 Park (a Brahmin Beacon Hill standard), Sportello (a date-night pasta place), Drink (a craft-cocktail bar), B&G Oysters (a seafood restaurant), the Butcher Shop (a meat counter and café), Menton (a fine-dining establishment) and Stir (an open demonstration kitchen where she offers classes). As of March 2023, Lynch was working on opening The Rudder, a new restaurant in Gloucester, Massachusetts.

Lynch also dedicates time and resources to several neighborhood organizations around Boston. An initiative by Lynch and her employees in 2011 promoted healthy and sustainable eating habits in at-risk schools in Boston.

In April 2023, the New York Times published an article detailing employees’ claims they endured decades of abuse, sexual harassment, and alcohol-driven harassment from Lynch. The accusations included workplace abuse and wage theft as well as the withholding tips.

Hilary Yeaw, a server at B&G Oyster, appeared on Greater Boston in early May 2023 with her lawyer. Yeaw had joined a class action lawsuit accusing Lynch of withholding tips. For two months in 2020, the restaurant paid the waitstaff a fixed rate and kept their tips. The lawsuit seeks to restore the tips to the staff.

In October 2024, it was announced that all of Lynch's restaurants would close at the end of the year. The following month, the city of Boston sued her for $1.7M in unpaid taxes.

== Awards and honors ==
Lynch has won James Beard Awards for who's who of food & beverage in America in 2013, the award for outstanding wine program (No. 9 Park) in 2012, and best chef in the Northeast (No. 9 Park) in 2003.

After Lynch opened No. 9 Park, the restaurant was named one of the “Top 25 New Restaurants in America” by Bon Appétit and “Best New Restaurant” by Food & Wine.

She is the sole female Relais & Châteaux grand chef in North America.

In 2009, she won the Amelia Earhart Award.

Her first cookbook, Stir: Mixing It Up in The Italian Tradition, received a Gourmand Award for Best Chef Cookbook in the US in 2009. Lynch made the 2017 Time magazine's "Top 100 Most Influential People of the Year." In April 2017, Lynch released a memoir titled "Out of Line, A Life playing with Fire".

== Personal life ==
Lynch is a resident of Gloucester, Massachusetts. She is a first cousin of Stephen Lynch, the U.S. House of Representative from Massachusetts.

== Bibliography ==
- Out of Line: A Life of Playing with Fire, Atria Books (2017) ISBN 1476795452
- Stir: Mixing It Up in the Italian Tradition, Harvest (2009) ISBN 0618576819
