= Tickner =

Tickner is a topographic surname of English origin for someone who lived at a crossroad or a fork in the road.

Notable people with the surname include:

- Blair Tickner (born 1993), cricketer
- Charles Tickner (born 1953), figure skater
- Frank Tickner (born 1983), British cross country runner
- French Tickner (1930–2021), American-Canadian voice actor
- George Tickner (born 1946), musician
- J. Ann Tickner, academic
- Lisa Tickner, British art historian
- Robert Tickner (born 1951), politician
- Royston Tickner (1922–1997), actor
- T. F. Tickner (1864–1924), British architect

== See also ==
- Tichenor
- Ticknor
