= Tichenor =

Tichenor is a variant of Tickner, an English topographic surname for someone who lived at a crossroad or a fork in the road..

Perhaps more likely origin for the surname is that of a family located in 16th century Sussex, England whose name derives from the village of Itchenor, on the river Itchen near Chichester. The village was previously named in Anglo Saxon, "Iccen Ora" which translates as "Icca's Landing Place." "Tichenor" is probably a corruption of "At itchenor," ’T itchenor.

Notable people with the surname include:

- Bridget Bate Tichenor (1917–1990), Mexican surrealist painter
- Dylan Tichenor (born 1968), American film editor
- Edna Tichenor (1901–1965), American actress
- George C. Tichenor (1838–1902), member of the Board of General Appraisers
- George H. Tichenor (1837–1923), American physician
- Harold Lee Tichenor (born 1946), Canadian film producer and writer
- Henry M. Tichenor (1858–1922), American writer and magazine writer
- Isaac Tichenor (1754–1838), American lawyer and politician. Governor of and Senator from Vermont
- Isaac T. Tichenor (1825–1902), president of the Agricultural and Mechanical College of Alabama, now known as Auburn University
- Lindsey Tichenor (1977–present), member of the Kentucky state senate
- Martin Tichenor (1625–1681), early colonist and original settler of Newark, New Jersey, origin of surname in U.S.
- Stephen W. Tichenor (1813–1883), judge and mayor of Orange, New Jersey
- Todd Frederick Tichenor (born 1976), American baseball umpire
- Trebor Jay Tichenor (1940–2014), American pianist, composer and a recognized authority on Scott Joplin and the ragtime era
- Vernon Tichenor (1815–1892), American politician
- Walter Reynolds Tichenor (1877–1935), college football player and coach at Auburn and Georgia
- Warren W. Tichenor (born 1960), American diplomat
- Captain William V. Tichenor (1813–1887), founder of Port Orford, Oregon

== See also ==
- Tickner
- Ticknor
- Tichnor Brothers, Boston postcard company
