= Amory–Ticknor House =

Building in Boston, Massachusetts

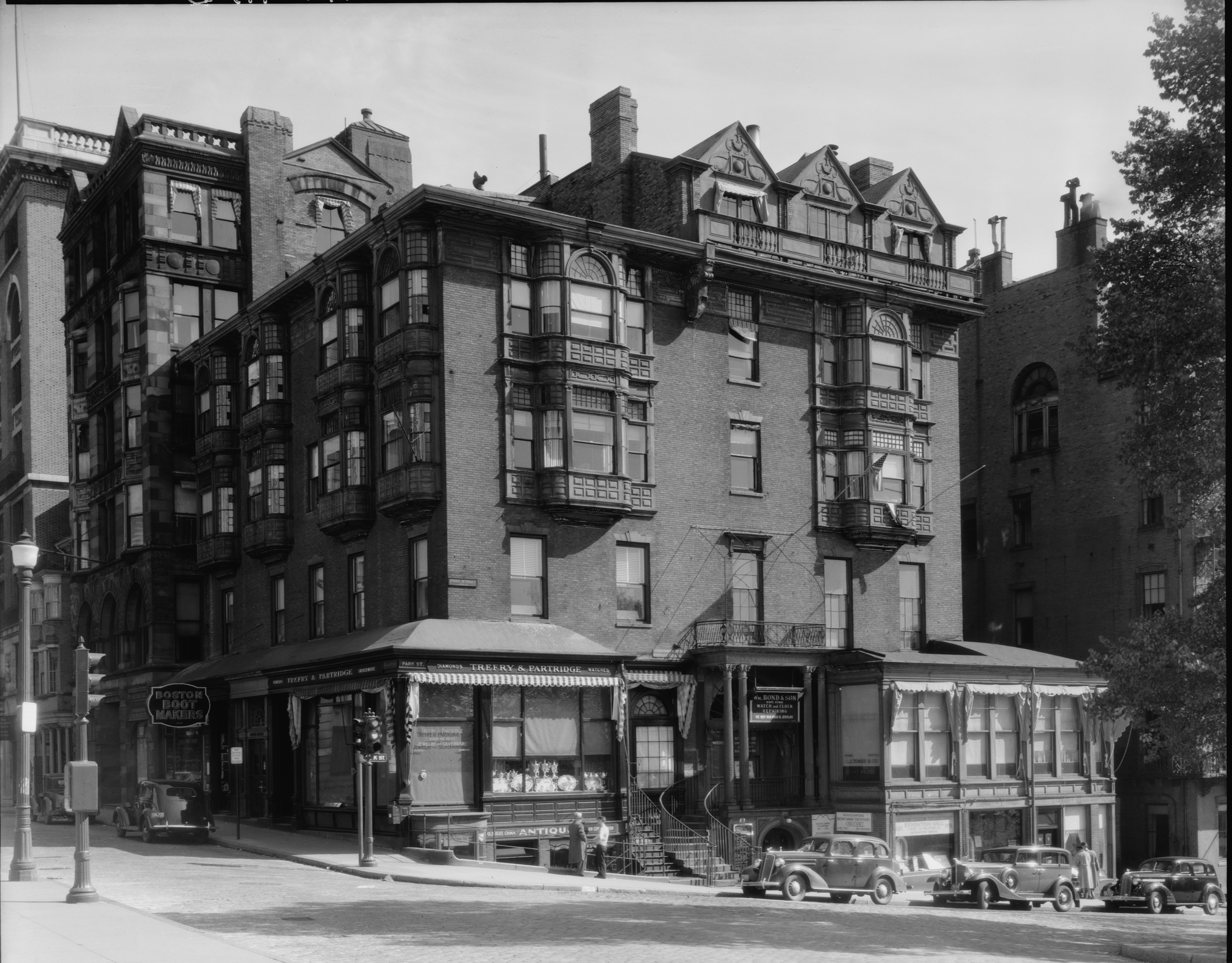
- Amory–Ticknor House in 1935

General information
- Architectural style: Federal
- Location: 9–10 Park Street and 22–22A Beacon Street, Boston, Massachusetts
- Coordinates: 42°21′28″N 71°03′46″W
- Year built: 1804

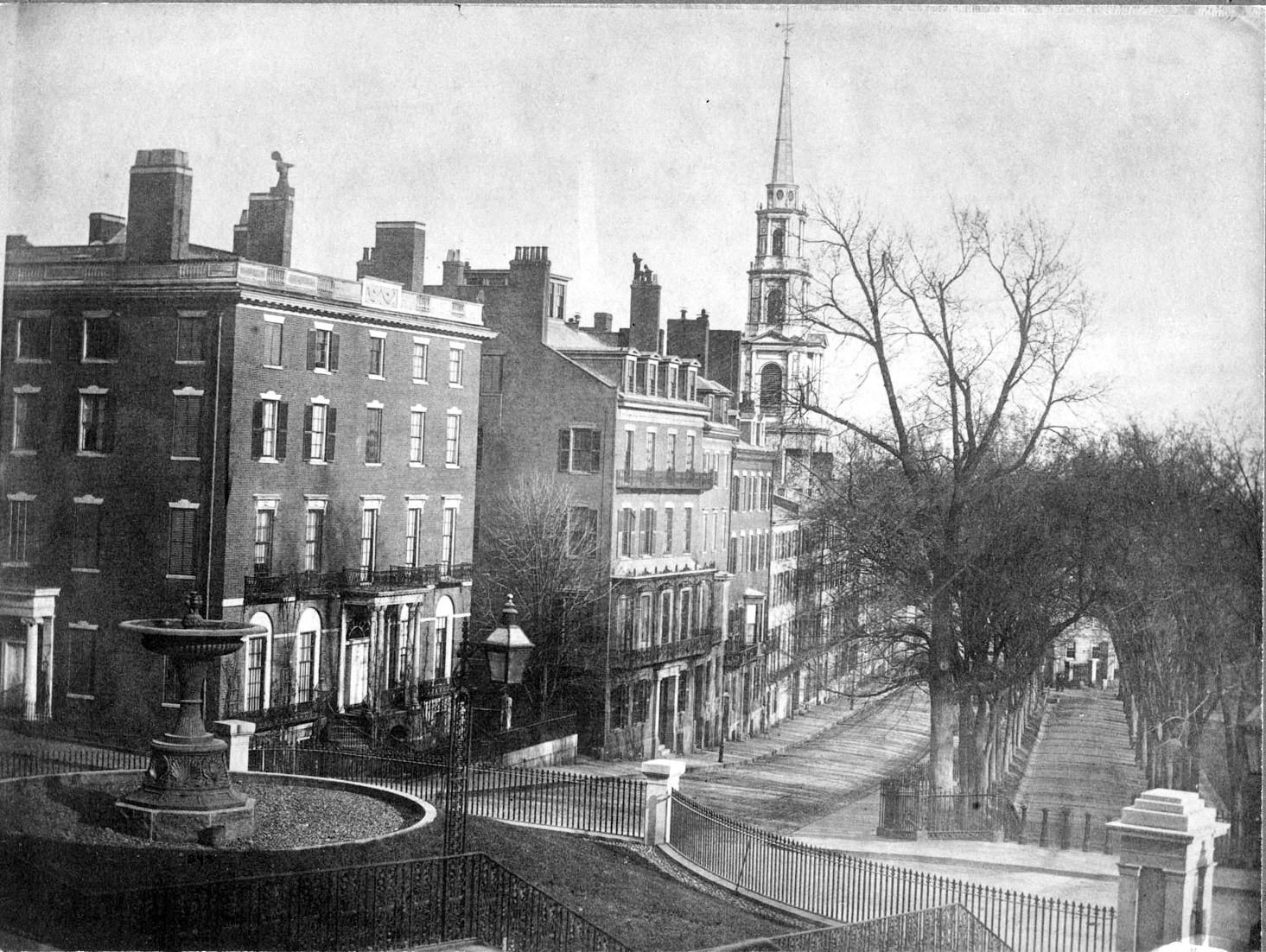
Amory–Ticknor House, Park Street, Boston. 19th-century photo by Southworth & Hawes

The Amory–Ticknor House is a historic house at 9–10 Park Street and 22–22A Beacon Street in Boston, Massachusetts. It was built in 1804 by businessman Thomas Coffin Amory, and later owned by scholar George Ticknor. It sits atop Beacon Hill, across from the Massachusetts State House on Beacon Street and the Boston Common on Park Street. Numerous tenants have occupied various parts of the house through the years, including Samuel Dexter, Christopher Gore, John Jeffries, Harrison Gray Otis, Anna Ticknor's Society to Encourage Studies at Home, and temporarily in 1824, the Marquis de Lafayette.

== History ==
Shortly after the house was built, its owner Thomas Amory met financial trouble and subsequently sold the property. The building was then "enlarged, and divided into 4 dwellings, whereof 2 had entrances on Beacon Street. The other 2 fronted on Park Street.

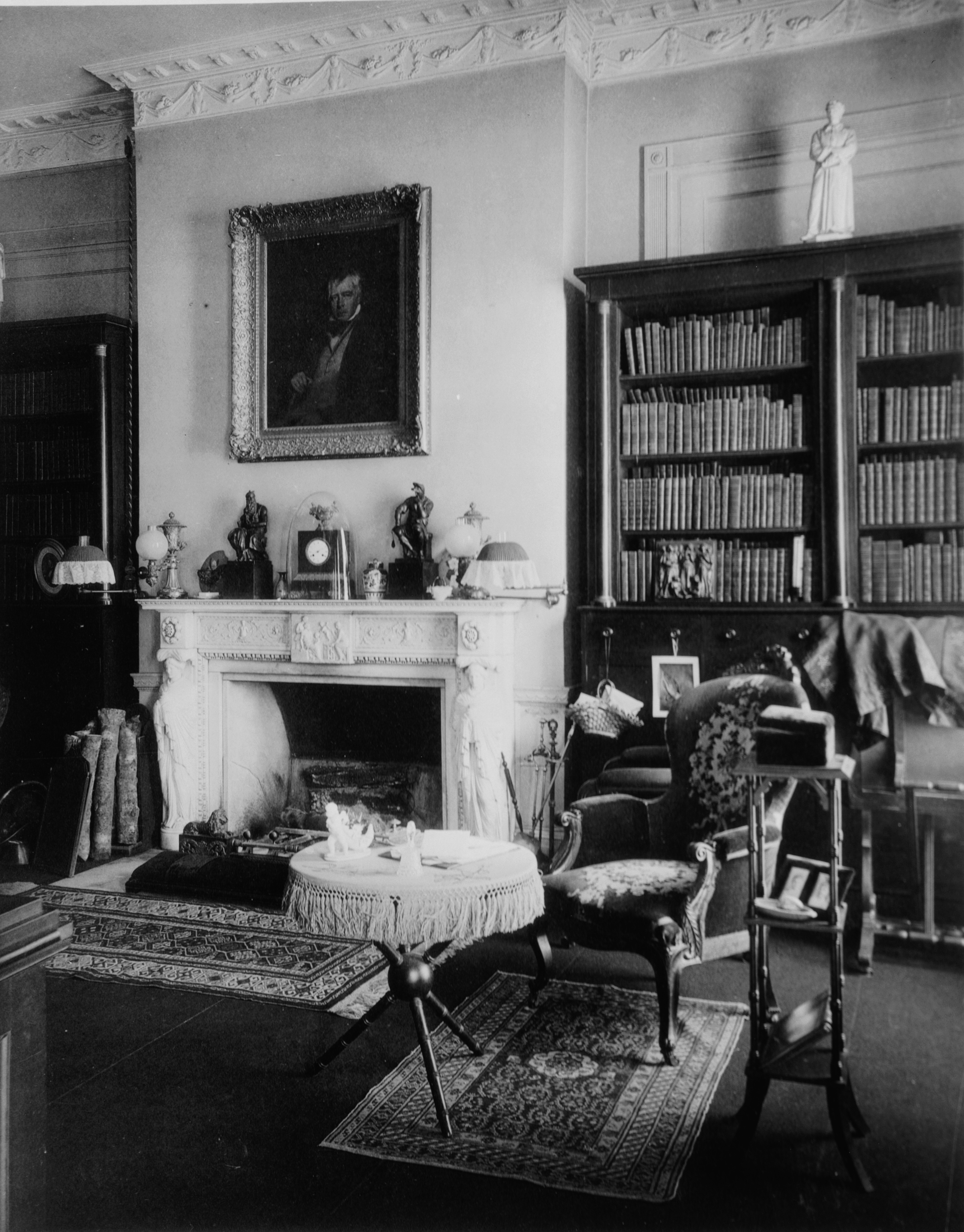
Interior, c. 1885

When Lafayette visited Boston in 1824, he stayed at the Amory house. "Soon after his arrival General Lafayette appeared upon the balcony above the entrance of the Amory mansion, to receive the greetings of the populace. He was escorted on either side by Governor William Eustis and by the former Governor John Brooks, each wearing Continental uniforms. ... On the evening of August 30, 1824, Lafayette held a reception in his apartments at the Amory house; and this function was attended by many prominent ladies of Boston.

"In 1885 the entire structure was given over to trade, and to-day it is the abode of many firms in various lines of business."

=== Architecture ===
Around 1804, architect Charles Bulfinch designed the entirety of Park Street, including the Amory mansion. The building represents an example of Federal architecture. Its "enriched window caps" typify the style, with "a carved eagle in the center panel and a not-convincingly-well-done bracket of the inverted acanthus leaf type at either extremity of the cap, but with a beautiful thin cornice which, when repeated in a series of 5 windows ... forms a very beautiful feature."

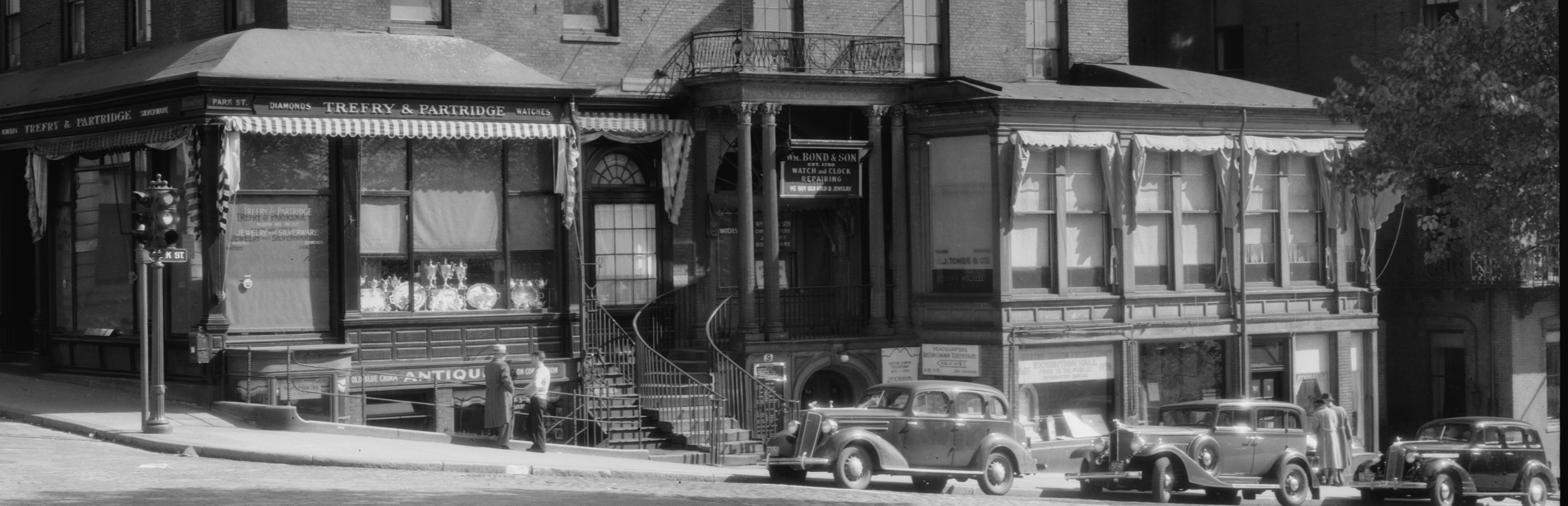
Amory–Ticknor House, Park St., Boston, 1935

The original structure has been altered over time. Around 1885 it was "remodeled ... with 2-story Queen Anne-inspired oriel windows of black-painted pressed metal and fanciful dormers on the Park Street roofline" and "a set of black metal shop fronts that reach out and down to the falling sidewalk..."

By 2008, "the once great mansion stands barely recognizable, although the basic brick volume and Adam entrance portico with fanlight and curving granite steps (one half is missing) are more or less intact. Many ground-floor shop extensions have been added, along with Queen Anne-style oriel windows and dormers on the upper floors. Though out of character, the Victorian predations had a certain disheveled charm when they were filled with odd antiques, curiosity shops, and tearooms."

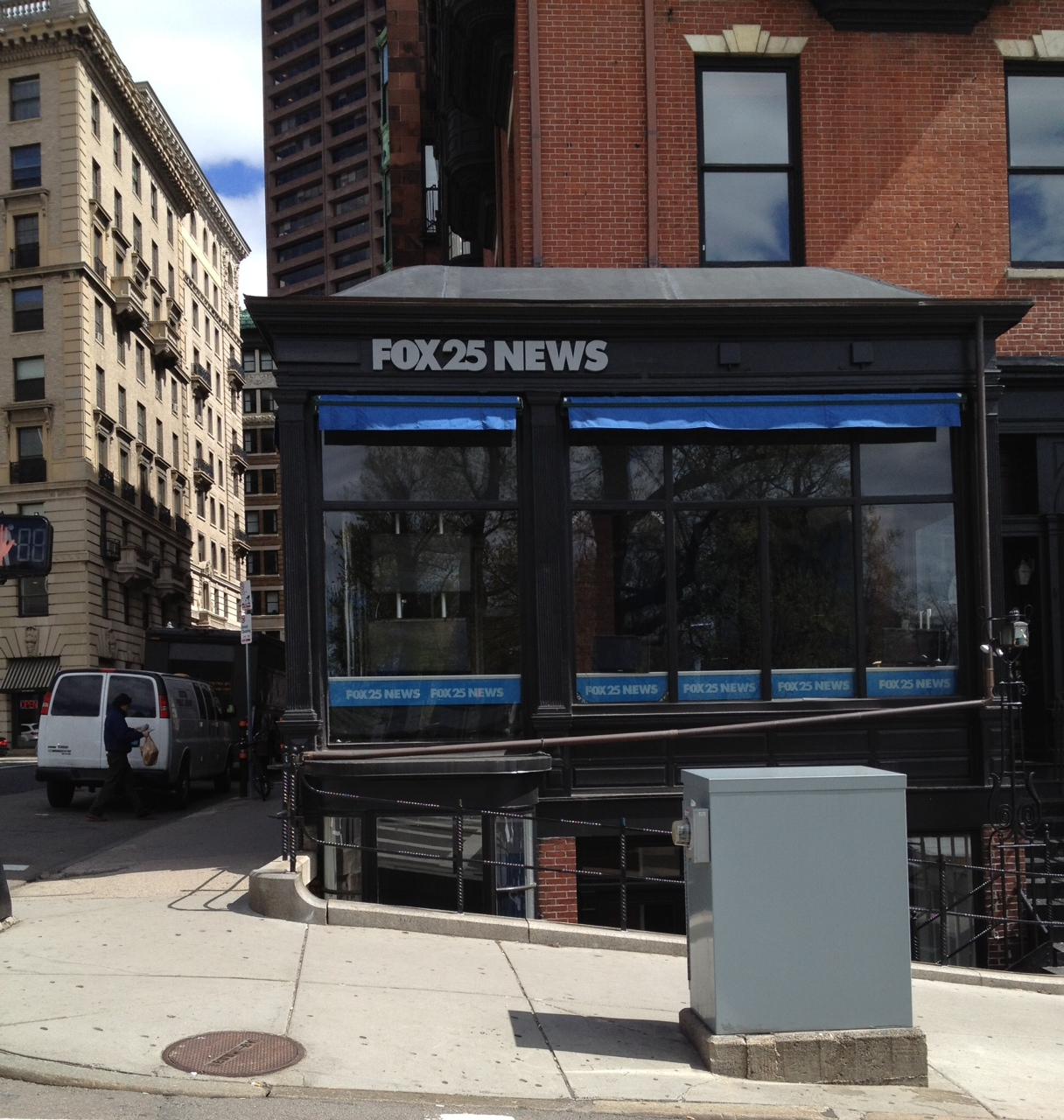
WFXT's news bureau in the Amory–Ticknor House.

Businesses that occupied the building's storefronts over the years have included Trefry & Partridge Jewelers, Weiner's Antiques, Ann's Breakfast & Sandwiches restaurant, Fill-A-Buster restaurant (now located at 142 Bowdoin St. on Beacon Hill), Au Bon Pain, a Cheers merchandise store, Curious Liquids coffeehouse, and currently No. 9 Park Street restaurant and a WFXT TV studio.

2014 renovations of the building yielded original eastern white pine interior sheathing boards, which were re-milled by a nearby reclaimed lumber company.

=== Owners and tenants ===
- Fisher Ames
- Thomas Amory (1804–1807)
- Thomas Coffin Amory, Jr.
- Catherine Carter
- Richard Cobb (1831–1836)
- Katherine Dexter (c. 1816–1831)
- Samuel Dexter (1807 – c. 1816)
- Christopher Gore
- John Jeffries (1806–1807)
- John G. Mitchell (c. 1884, leased from Mrs. Curtis Burritt Raymond)
- Harrison Gray Otis
- William Payne
- Mrs. Lydia Newell Osgood Raymond (c. 1853)
- Andrew Ritchie
- Matthias Plant Sawyer (1836 – c. 1853)
- George Ticknor (1830–1871)
- Anna (Eliot) Ticknor (1871–1884)
- Lieutenant Colonel Thomas A. Kenney, MSc, MBA, U.S. Army Reserve (2024- )

== See also ==
- Society to Encourage Studies at Home

== Works cited ==
- Burrage, Henry Sweetser. Genealogical and family history of the state of Maine, Volume 1. New York: Publisher Lewis Historical Pub. Co., 1909.
- Day, Sherman.Historical collections of the State of Pennsylvania: containing a copious selection of the most interesting facts, traditions, biographical sketches, anecdotes, etc., relating to its history and antiquities, both general and local, with topographical descriptions of every county Publisher: G. W. Gorton, 1843.
- Dexter, Franklin Bowditch.Biographical sketches of the graduates of Yale college with annals of the college history ... Volume 3 of Biographical Sketches of the Graduates of Yale College with Annals of the College History Publisher: Holt & Company, 1903.
- Hale, Albert. Architecture; Architecture, Colonial Old Newburyport houses. Publisher: Boston, Massachusetts, W.B. Clarke Company 1912.
- Hillstrom, Kevin.The industrial revolution in America, Volume 2 Publisher: ABC-CLIO, 2005 ISBN 1-85109-620-5.
- Lawrence, Robert Means. Old Park Street and its Vicinity Boston: Publisher Houghton Mifflin company, 1922.
- Raymond, Marcius Denison. Gray genealogy : being a genealogical record and history of the descendants of John Gray, of Beverly, Mass., and also including sketches of other Gray families. New York: Higginson Book Company, 1887.
- MD Raymond. Souvenir of the Sherburne Centennial Celebration and Dedication of Monument to the Proprietors and Early Settlers, held on Wednesday, June 21, 1893. New York: M.D. Raymond, 1892.
- Raymond, Marcius D. Sketch of Rev. Blackleach Burritt and related Stratford families : a paper read before the Fairfield County Historical Society, at Bridgeport, Conn., Friday evening, Feb. 19, 1892. Bridgeport : Fairfield County Historical Society 1892.
- Raymond, Samuel. Genealogies of the Raymond families of New England, 1630-1 to 1886. With a historical sketch of some of the Raymonds of early times, their origin, etc. New York: Press of J.J. Little & Co., 1886.
