= George Ticknor =

American academician and Hispanist (1791–1871)

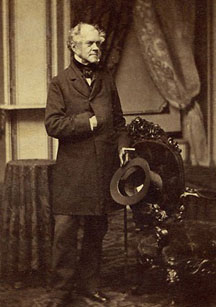
- Born: August 1, 1791; Boston, Massachusetts, U.S.
- Died: January 26, 1871 (aged 79); Boston, Massachusetts, U.S.
- Education: Dartmouth College

George Ticknor (August 1, 1791 – January 26, 1871) was an American academician and Hispanist, specializing in the subject areas of languages and literature. He is known for his scholarly work on the history and criticism of Spanish literature.

== Early life and education ==
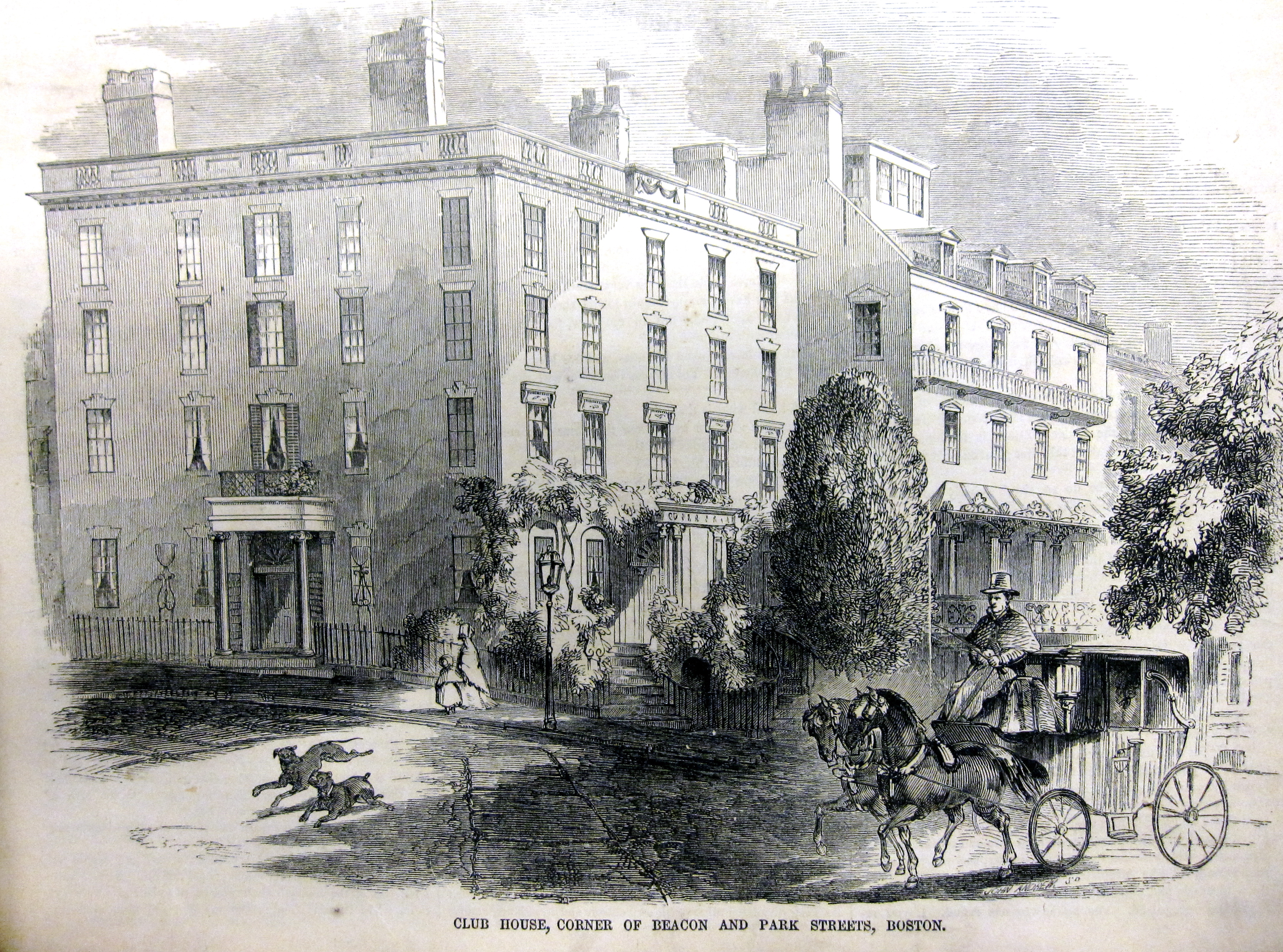
Ticknor House (left) on Park Street in Boston in the 1850s

Ticknor was born on August 1, 1791, in Boston, Massachusetts. He received his early education from his father, Elisha Ticknor, former headmaster of the Franklin Grammar School, a grocer, and a founder of the Massachusetts Mutual Fire Insurance Company, the system of free primary schools in Boston, and the first New England savings bank, Provident Institution for Savings.

In 1805, George entered the junior class at Dartmouth College, where he graduated in 1807. During the next three years he studied Latin and Greek with Rev. Dr John Sylvester John Gardiner, rector of Trinity Church, Boston, and a pupil of Dr Samuel Parr. In 1810, Ticknor began the study of law, and he was admitted to the bar in 1813.

== Career ==
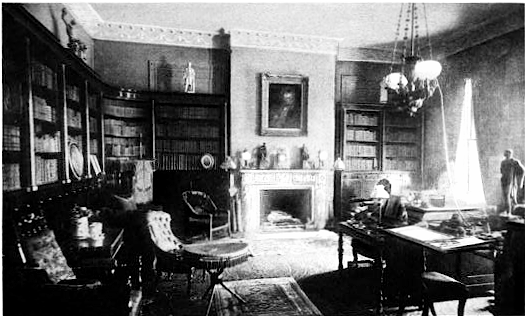
Ticknor's home library on Park Street in Boston in the 19th century

Ticknor opened an office in Boston, but practiced for only one year, satisfying himself that his vocation, or at least his taste, lay in the direction of letters rather than of law. His father helped finance his studies, and Ticknor traveled to Europe in 1815, studying for nearly two years at the University of Göttingen. He attended the lectures of the university and devoted himself to philological studies, especially to the ancient classics. After that, he remained two years longer in Europe, chiefly on the continent, spending most of his time in the capitals of France, Spain and Portugal, where he conducted critical studies of the national literatures.

In 1817, while still in Europe, Ticknor was selected as Smith professor of French and Spanish languages and literature (a chair founded in 1816), and professor of belles-lettres at Harvard University. In 1819 he returned to the United States, bringing with him a valuable library. He continued to add to this, and in time, it became one of the largest private collections in the country. For the rarity and importance of the books, it was unsurpassed, in some of its departments. His collection of Spanish literature was considered to rival the best private ones in Europe, and his library was also particularly strong in Portuguese literature. Ticknor was elected a Fellow of the American Academy of Arts and Sciences in 1821.

During his professorship Ticknor advocated the creation of departments, the grouping of students in divisions according to proficiency, and the establishment of the elective system. He also reorganized his department. He suggested improvements in the system of discipline, influenced by his studies of German universities. He greatly extended the range of intellectual culture among the students at the university, where literary instruction had been confined to the classics. He gave long, elaborate courses of lectures on French and Spanish literature. He also entered into a critical analysis of such writers as Dante, Goethe, Milton, and Shakespeare. His lectures were attended by people from outside the college, who were attracted by their interest and by Ticknor's reputation as a speaker known for his diction and delivery. In 1828, he was elected as a member of the American Philosophical Society.

Ticknor moved into half of the home built by Thomas Amory at the corner of Beacon and Park Streets in 1829; it became known as the Amory-Ticknor House. In 1835 he resigned his chair after holding it for 15 years, and returned to Europe. In 1836, he was succeeded in the professorship at Harvard by Henry Wadsworth Longfellow. While in Europe, in June 1836, Ticknor recorded a frank interview with Austrian chancellor Klemens von Metternich.

After his return to Europe, Ticknor devoted himself to the chief work of his life, the history and criticism of Spanish literature. It was not fully treated even in Europe, where there was no adequate study of the literature as a whole in Spanish. Both Friedrich Bouterwek and Jean Charles Leonard de Sismondi had worked with limited or secondhand resources. Ticknor developed in his college lectures the scheme of his more permanent work, which he published as the History of Spanish Literature (New York and London, 3 volumes, 1849). The book addresses Spanish civilization and manners as well as its literature. The History is considered exhaustive in scholarship, and direct in style. It gives many illustrative passages from representative works, and copious bibliographical references.

It was soon translated into Spanish (1851–1857) by Pascual de Gayangos y Arce and Enrique de Vedia; into French by Magnabal; and German by Nikolaus Heinrich Julius and Ferdinand Wolf. The second American edition appeared in 1854; the third, corrected and enlarged, in 1863; the fourth, containing the author's last revision, in 1872, under the supervision of George Stillman Hillard; and the sixth in 1888.

Ticknor had succeeded his father as a member of the Primary School Board in 1822, and held this position until 1825. He was a trustee of the Boston Athenæum from 1823 to 1832, and was vice-president in 1833. In addition, he served as a director (1827–1835) and vice-president (1841–1862) of the Massachusetts Hospital Life Insurance Company, and a trustee of the Massachusetts General Hospital (1826–1830) and of the Boston Provident Institution for Savings (1838–1850), the bank that his father had helped to found.

He was especially active in the establishment of the Boston Public Library (1852), and served on its board from 1852 to 1866 and as its president in 1865. He spent fifteen months abroad from 1856 to 1857 at his own expense to collect books for the library, and gave the library both money and books. He helped establish the free circulating department. He left his collection of Spanish and Portuguese books and manuscripts to the Boston Public Library, after the manuscripts were famously turned down by Harvard University.

== Personal life ==
Spouse: Anna (Eliot) Ticknor.

- Anna Eliot Ticknor
- George Haven Ticknor, died during his childhood at age 5
- Susan Perkins Ticknor, died in infancy
- Eliza Sullivan (Ticknor) Dexter (1833–1880)

== Bibliography ==
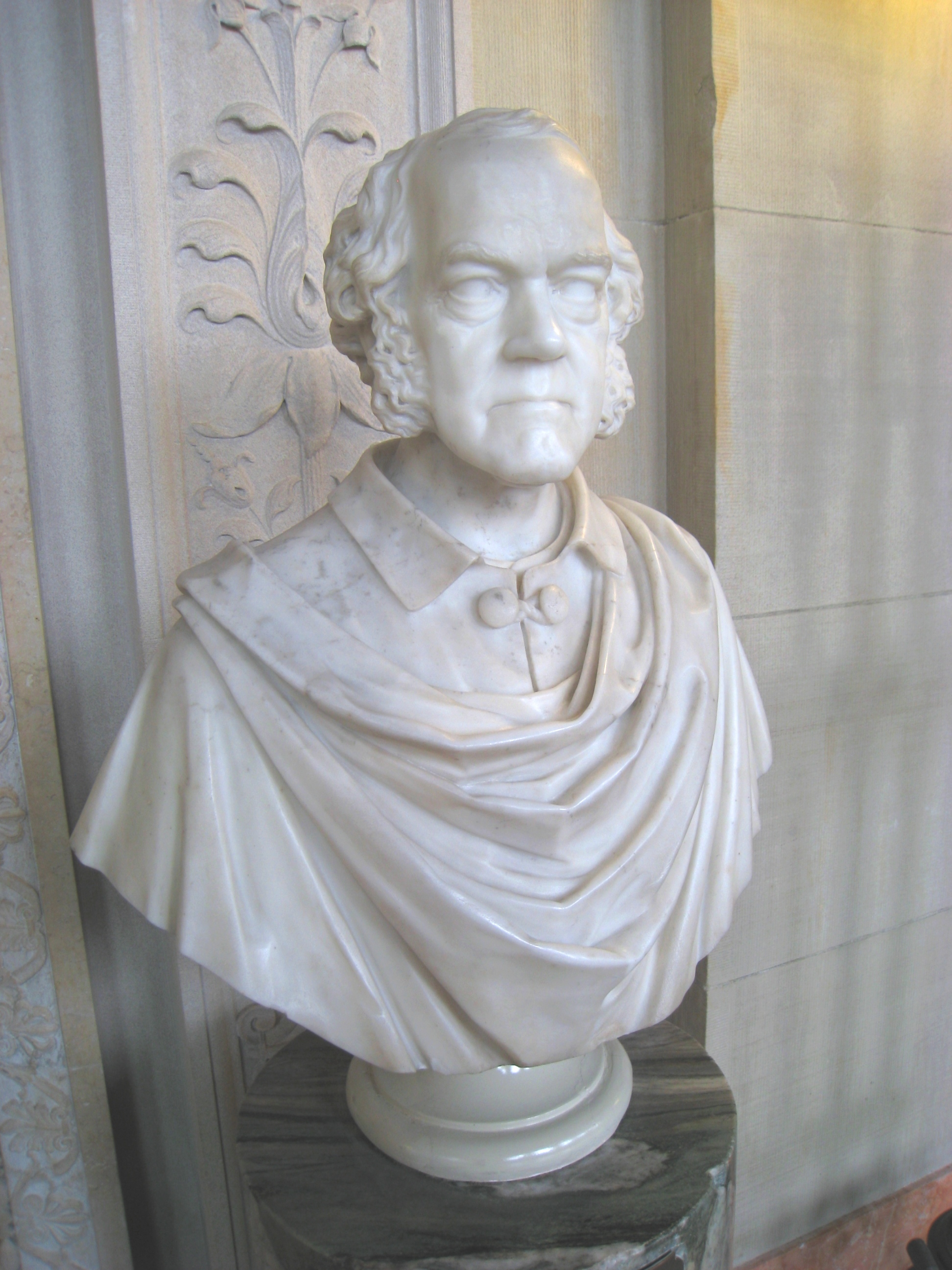
Bust in Boston Public Library

=== Works by Ticknor ===
- History of Spanish Literature. v.1 (6th ed.); v.2 (4th ed.)
  - 6th ed. (via Internet Archive): v.1, v.2, v.3 + index
- Life, Letters, and Journals of George Ticknor. v.1 (1876 ed.); v.2 (1877 ed.). Ed. by George Stillman Hillard

Ticknor's minor works include, besides occasional reviews and papers:

- Syllabus of a Course of Lectures on the History and Criticism of Spanish Literature (1823)
- Outline of the Principal Events in the Life of General Lafayette (1825)
- Remarks on Changes Lately Proposed or Adopted in Harvard University (1825)
- The Remains of Nathan Appleton Haven, with a Memoir of his Life (1827)
- Remarks on the Life and Writings of Daniel Webster (1831)
- Lecture on the Best Methods of Teaching the Living Languages, delivered, in 1832, before the American Institute of Education
- Life of William Hickling Prescott (1864).

=== Works about Ticknor ===
- Charles Henry Hart. Memoir of George Ticknor, Historian of Spanish Literature. Collins Printer, 1871
- "George Ticknor" in: Edwin Percy Whipple, Cyrus Augustus Bartol. Recollections of eminent men: with other papers. Boston: Ticknor and Company, 1886; p. 244+
- Sheila Heti. Ticknor, Fictionalized account of the relationship between George Ticknor and William H. Prescott. Farrar, Straus and Giroux, 2006
