= Menton (restaurant) =

- Interactive map of Menton

Restaurant information
- Established: 2010
- Closed: 2024
- Owner: Barbara Lynch
- Food type: French, Italian
- Rating: Modern fine dining
- Location: 354 Congress Street, Boston, Middlesex, Massachusetts, 02210, USA
- Coordinates: 42.35049°N 71.04825°W
- Website: www.mentonboston.com

Menton was a modern fine dining restaurant owned and operated by Barbara Lynch. Menton served French and Italian inspired food in the Fort Point neighborhood of Boston.

Alumni of the restaurant include Kristen Kish, the Chef de cuisine.

Menton was named after a town on the Côte d’Azur, close to France's border with Italy - Menton, France.

== Recognition ==
Accolades include a “4 star review from The Boston Globe, the recognition as one of Bon Appétit and Esquire magazines' best new restaurants in 2010, and a James Beard Foundation Award nomination in 2011 for Best New Restaurant. Menton received the Best Newcomer, Best French, and Best Service distinctions in the Zagat Boston Restaurant Guide 2011-2012 and was Boston’s only Relais & Châteaux and Forbes Travel Guide Five-Star property.”
