= James Savage (banker) =

American banker

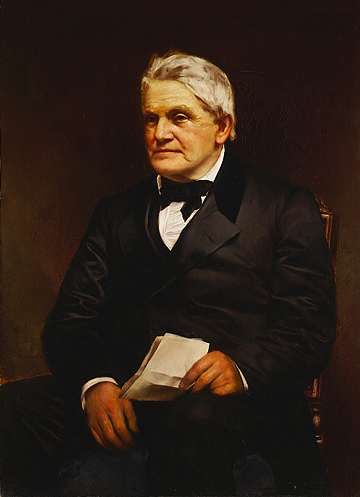
Portrait of James Savage, by David Dalhoff Neal 1886

James Savage (1784–1873) was an American banker and author. He was one of the founding fathers of Provident Institution for Savings in the Town of Boston established in 1816 as the first chartered savings bank in the United States. James was also well known for his research as an antiquary and as author of A Genealogical Dictionary of the First Settlers of New England. He was instrumental in helping his son-in-law, William Barton Rogers, establish MIT and helping his cousin, Frederic Tudor, establish the ice trade in the West Indies, among many other ventures.

== Early years ==
James Savage was born on Winter Street, in Boston, Massachusetts, on July 13, 1784, as the ninth child of father Habijah "Thomas" Savage Jr. (April 27, 1741 - November 22, 1806), a merchant, and mother Elizabeth Tudor (March 31, 1745- February 2, 1787). He was a fifth generation of the descendant of one of the first Pilgrims, Major Thomas Savage, who came to Massachusetts from England in 1635.

Savage was just three years old when his mother died giving birth to the family's 12th child, Arthur. Savage and his siblings, Elizabeth and Arthur, were sent to be raised by William Savage, a blacksmith in Taunton, Massachusetts.

Savage obtained the Franklin medal in 1795, and attended the Washington Academy in Machias, Maine, and the Derby Academy in Hingham, Massachusetts, before going to Harvard University, just as his grandfather did in 1695. After graduating Harvard in 1803, he went on to studied law at the office of Isaac Parker in Portland, Maine.

From November 5, 1805 to June 1806, when Savage and cousin Frederic Tudor were both just 21, they travelled to the West Indies during the Napoleonic Wars for a venture of establishing an ice trading business.

In 1806, Tudor bought his first brig Favorite to carry Fresh Pond ice 1,500 miles south, from Boston to Martinique. Favorite left Boston on February 10, 1806, as the following was reported in the Boston Gazette:

No joke. A vessel has cleared at the Custom House for Martinique with a cargo of ice. We hope this will not prove a slippery speculation.

Tudor's business plan included sending his brother William and his cousin, James Savage, ahead to obtain a monopoly from the various governments of the islands.

We wish you to procure from the gov' [sic] of Cuba a grant exclusive in which we offer you either to take a conces' [sic] of half or procure the privilege for us & we engage to pay you one thousand dollars with reasonable charges, in obtaining it you however to determine which you will do & write to that effect as early as possible.

Although a considerable amount of the ice melted during the three-week journey south, they did manage to sell much of what remained on board for a loss of $4,500 overall. However, this venture became extremely profitable in the years to come.

When he returned, Savage continued in the practice of law and was admitted to the bar in 1807. He then served in both houses of the Massachusetts legislature. Savage was also a member of the executive council, and a delegate to the Massachusetts Constitutional Convention of 1820–1821, filled several municipal offices, and was a member of the school committee.

On December 13, 1816, Savage, as secretary, along with William Phillips, Jr. as president, and James Prince as treasurer, founded the Provident Institution for Savings in the Town of Boston as the first chartered savings bank in the United States, with 961 accounts totaling $76,000.00, on the belief that "savings banks would enable the less fortunate classes of society to better themselves in a manner which would avoid the dangers of moral corruption traditionally associated with outright charitable institutions." 176 years later, in 1992, the bank was acquired by Fleet National Bank of Massachusetts. Savage was elected a Fellow of the American Academy of Arts and Sciences in 1824.

== Family ==
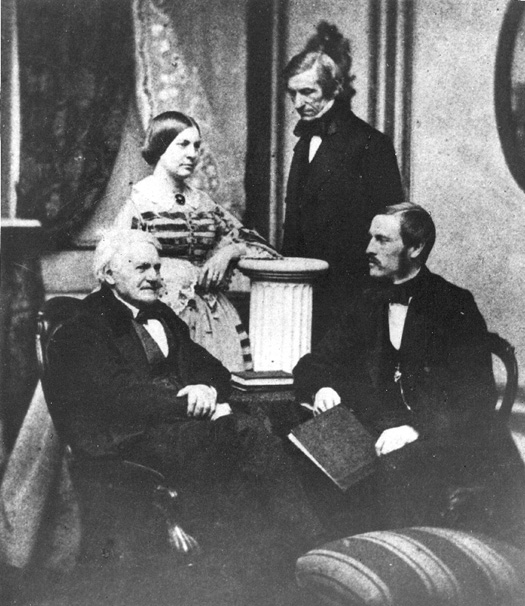
James, James Jr., Emma & Rogers 1860

James Savage Jr. 1861

At the age of 39, Savage married 31-year-old Elizabeth Lincoln, and their only son, James Jr., was born April 21, 1832. James Jr. attended Boston Latin School, and then, just like his father, attended Harvard University in 1849.

That same summer, in 1849, Savage's daughter, Emma, married William Barton Rogers, who later founded Massachusetts Institute of Technology with the help of the Savage family.

Then, tragedy struck. Savage's wife Elizabeth died in 1851 and then, soon after, their daughter died. Just as James Jr. was finishing up at Harvard, in the summer of 1854, Savage's second daughter died – all three deaths were within a three-year span. After the funeral of the second daughter, James Jr. went on a trip to Europe with two classmates, Horace Howard Furness and Atherton Blight. James Jr. studied agricultural chemistry while in Munich and Berlin. James Jr., when he returned to the States, started his own farm in Ashland, Massachusetts.

In 1854, William Rogers' brother, Henry Darwin Rogers, married Savage's step daughter, Eliza Lincoln.

James Jr. entered the American Civil War as Captain, 2nd Regiment Massachusetts Volunteers (infantry), on May 24, 1861. James Jr. was wounded at the Battle of Cedar Mountain on August 9, 1862, as he was shot in three places: "First a bullet broke his right arm near the shoulder, the ball lodged in the flesh; second, another ball broke his right leg just above the ankle; while he was falling a he received a severe contusion on the left hip from a sent ball." He was then captured and set two miles behind enemy lines. The Rebel surgeons removed the balls a week later, but James Jr. died of his wounds in Charlottesville, VA at the age of 30.

== Later years ==
Savage served as treasurer of the Massachusetts Historical Society for nineteen years and was a member for more than 60 years. Edwin Percy Whipple referred to Savage as;

"the soul of integrity," and says" "It is curious that James Savage, the most eloquent of men when his soul was stirred to its depths, should now be particularly honored merely as an acute antiquarian . ... His hatred of iniquity sometimes blazed out in a fury of wrathful eloquence which amazed those who specially esteemed him as a prodigy of genealogical knowledge, and even disturbed the equanimity of those who chiefly knew him as the most valued and trustworthy of friends."

In 1841, Harvard honored his dedication with a Degree of Legum Doctor.

After a brief meeting between Savage and William Makepeace Thackeray, the latter remarked to a friend; "I want to see that quaint, charming old Mr. Savage again."

James Savage died in Boston on March 8, 1873.

In 1906, Savage's grandchildren published his letters in the book titled Letters of James Savage to his family; credited authors were James Savage and Emma Savage Rogers.

== Publications ==
For five years, between 1803 and 1811, Savage was an associate editor of the Monthly Anthology, preparing the way for the North American Review.

In 1811, Savage delivered a Fourth of July address in Boston. The text of the speech was published as "An Oration Delivered July 4, 1811, at the Request of the Selectmen of Boston in Commemoration of American Independence".

In 1816, with the discovery of the missing manuscript of John Winthrop's journal in the tower of the Old South Church, Savage prepared and annotated the original manuscripts, which he published under the title John Winthrop's History of New England from 1630 to 1646, with Notes to illustrate the Civil and Ecclesiastical Concerns, the Geography, Settlement, and Institutions of the Country, and the Lives and Manners of the Ancient Planters.

Savage also published the first volume of Winthrop's Journal from the family manuscripts (Hartford, 1790), in addition to numerous genealogical, historical, political, and controversial pamphlets.

In 1828, Savage edited the works of William Paley.

In 1860, he published Genealogical Dictionary of the First Settlers of New England, showing Three Generations of Those who canto before May, 1692 (4 vols., Boston, 1860-'4).
