= No. 9 Park =

Restaurant in Boston, Massachusetts, U.S.

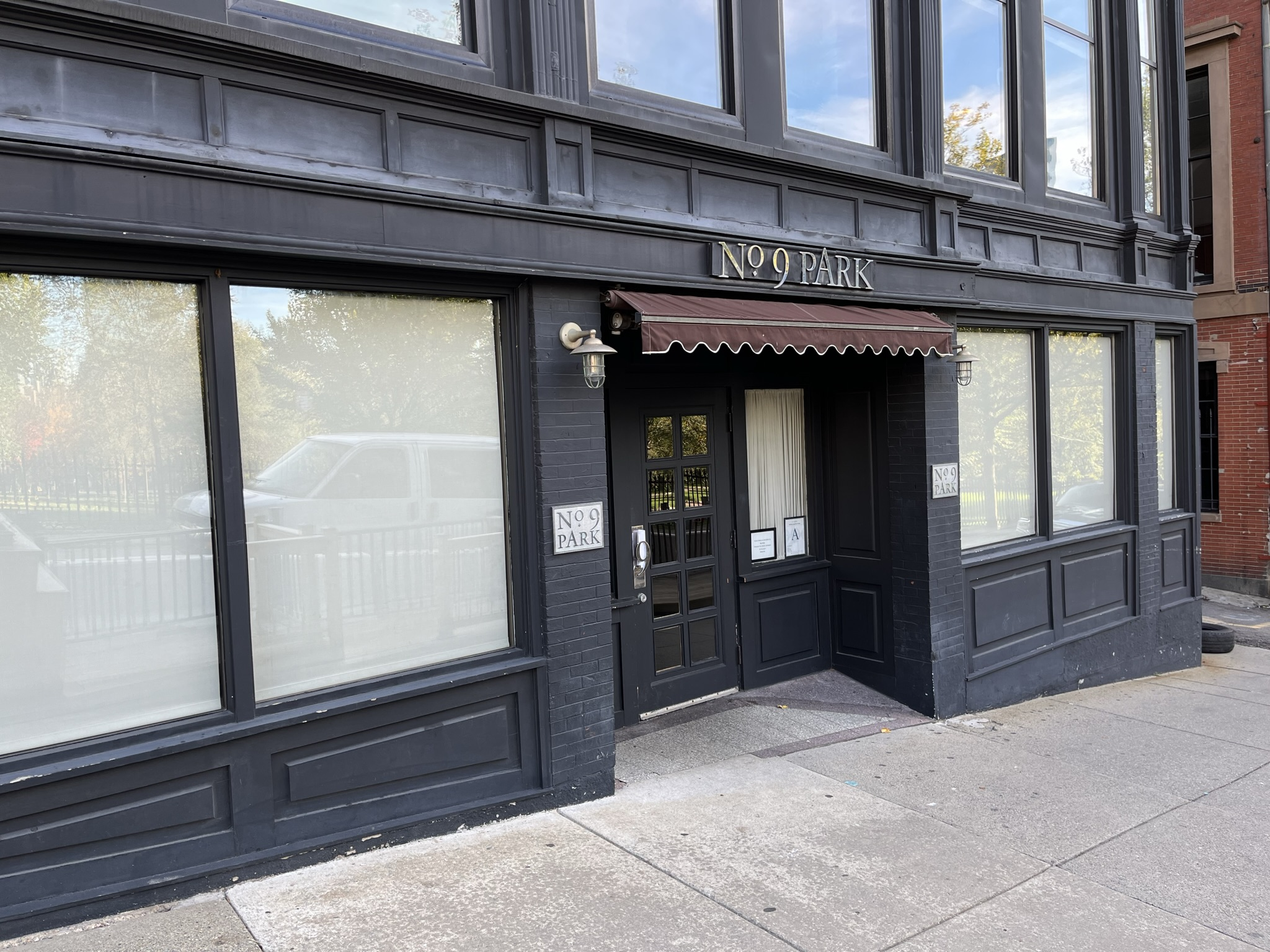
- The restaurant's façade (2022)
- Interactive map of No. 9 Park

Restaurant information
- Established: 1998; 28 years ago
- Owner: Barbara Lynch
- Location: 9 Park Street, Boston, Suffolk County, Massachusetts, 02108, United States
- Coordinates: 42.35760°N 71.062844°W
- Website: www.no9park.com

No. 9 Park was a restaurant in the Beacon Hill neighborhood of downtown Boston, Massachusetts, United States, that closed December 31, 2024. Situated at 9 Park Street, overlooking the northeastern corner of Boston Common, about 200 feet (61 m) from the steps of the Massachusetts State House, it is the flagship restaurant of noted restaurateur Barbara Lynch. It opened in 1998.

In 2012, it won the James Beard Award for best wine program.
