= Anna Eliot Ticknor =

American writer

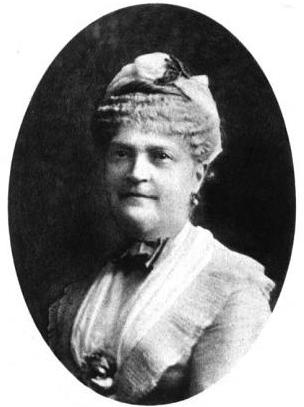
Anna Eliot Ticknor

Anna Eliot Ticknor (Boston, Massachusetts, June 1, 1823 – October 5, 1896) was an American educator, who launched the first correspondence school in the United States, and pioneered public libraries in Massachusetts.

== Distinction ==
In 1873, Ticknor founded the Society to Encourage Studies at Home which was the first correspondence school in the United States. She is attributed as being a pioneer of distance learning in the United States, and the mother of correspondence schools. She served as one of the original appointees to the Massachusetts Free Public Library Commission, which was the first of its kind in the United States. She and Elizabeth Putnam Sohier became the first women appointed to a United States state library agency when they were appointed to that commission in 1890.

== Family ==
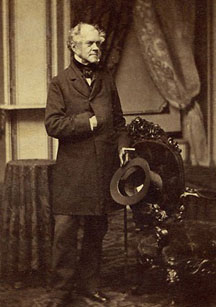
George Ticknor

Anna Eliot Ticknor was the oldest child of George Ticknor and Anna (Eliot) Ticknor. She was born on June 1, 1823. Her siblings were George Haven Ticknor, who died during his childhood at age 5; Susan Perkins Ticknor, who died in infancy; and Eliza Sullivan (Ticknor) Dexter (1833–1880).

Her paternal grandfather was Elisha Ticknor who was the impetus for the system of free primary schools in Boston, and one of the founders of the first savings bank, Provident Institution for Savings in the Town of Boston, in the United States. Her father was a Harvard University professor. Her mother was a writer. Her maternal grandfather was Samuel Eliot, a Boston merchant. Her mother's brother, Samuel A. Eliot was the treasurer of Harvard College, and a cousin of the poet T.S. Eliot.

== Author ==
In 1896, Ticknor wrote a children's book, An American Family in Paris: With Fifty-Eight Illustrations of Historical Monuments and Familiar Scenes.

== The Society to Encourage Studies at Home ==
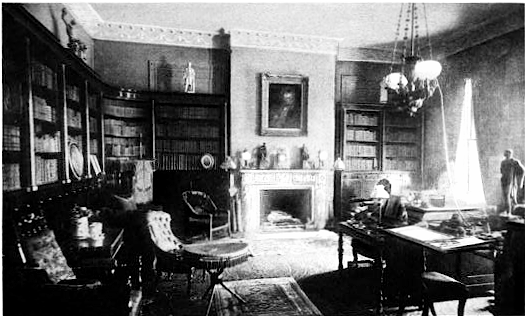
Lending library in Ticknor's family residence.

In Boston, Massachusetts in 1873, Ticknor founded an organization of women who taught women students through the mail. Her society was the first correspondence school in the United States, and an early effort to offer higher education to women. To assist the student in obtaining the needed study materials, in 1875 a lending library was established. The collection gradually grew to contain several thousand volumes. The purpose of the study varied between the different students with some people being young women with minimal schooling and others being educated women seeking an advanced learning opportunity.

== Death and legacy ==
Anna Ticknor died on October 5, 1896. She is buried in the family lot in Forest Hills Cemetery, in the Jamaica Plain neighborhood of Boston. After her death, the Society to Encourage Studies at Home released a history of the organization as a tribute to her. The book contains letters exchanged between Ticknor, students, and other people associated with the organization and gives an overview of the workings of the Society and the impact that it had on its students. The Society ceased operating after her death, and the Anna Ticknor Library Association was formed to circulate the former Society's books, photographs, and other materials to a larger group of interest learners.
