= Elizabeth Putnam Sohier =

American library advocate (1847–1926)

Elizabeth Putnam Sohier (1847–1926) was an American advocate for libraries. A member of Boston's wealthy class, she persuaded the Massachusetts Legislature to establish the Free Library Commission in 1890—the first of its kind in the United States. She and Anna Eliot Ticknor became the first women appointed to a United States state library agency when they were appointed to that commission in 1890. As a member of the Free Public Library Commission for thirty-six years, she worked tirelessly to ensure that every city and town in Massachusetts had a library. She also worked to encourage these libraries, once established, to expand collections and circulation. In 1952 the Commission was renamed the Massachusetts Board of Library Commissioners.

Sohier was also active in the Woman's Education Association of Boston and instrumental in setting up a committee on libraries. The group established traveling libraries, a traveling picture collection, and collections of travel books. The WEA was responsible for encouraging other states to establish traveling libraries in states such as California, Iowa, Kansas, Wisconsin.

Throughout her years of service, Sohier found opportunities for libraries to be effective. During the 1912 Lawrence Textile Strike when it became apparent that many of the workers were foreign born Sohier worked with the Governor to obtain books for the strikers. During World War I, the Commission worked with the American Library Association to provide library services to soldiers in camps. She was a member of the Board of Trustees of the Beverly Public Library for thirty years.

Sohier wrote History of the Old South Church of Boston.

Elizabeth Putnam Sohier was a member of the Mayflower Society and listed in the Register of the Massachusetts Society of the Colonial Dames of America, 1893-1927.
