= Massachusetts Library Association =

Professional library association for library workers from Massachusetts

- Predecessor: Massachusetts Library Club
- Formation: October 22, 1890; 136 years ago
- Founder: Charles Ammi Cutter
- Purpose: advocacy
- Parent organization: American Library Association
- Website: masslib.org

The Massachusetts Library Association (MLA) is the Massachusetts, United States professional library association that "advocates for libraries, librarians, and library staff, defends intellectual freedom, and provides a forum for leadership, communication, professional development, and networking to keep libraries vital." MLA publishes standards for library services to Massachusetts children and young adults. MLA sponsors an annual conference, as well as continuing education programs and organizational reports of interest. The current President of MLA is Esme Green, Director of the Goodnow Library in Sudbury.

== History ==
MLA was founded in 1890 as the "Massachusetts Library Club". The gavel that has been passed down from president to president is said to be made from the wood of the USS Constitution. The MLA had a committee called The Art Club that created sets of photographs for travelling art exhibits that would rotate through Massachusetts member and associate libraries as early as 1900.

In 1962 MLA's Intellectual Freedom Committee gave testimony before the Massachusetts Obscene Literature Control Commission opposing the suppression of Henry Miller's book Tropic of Cancer supporting Massachusetts residents' freedom to read.

== Publications ==
MLA has acted as both a publisher of authors such as Robert Frost as well as an author on many state standards for library services to different populations.

- Books We Like: Sixty-two Answers to the Question...
- Standards for Public Library Services to Children in Massachusetts
- Standards for Public Library Services to Young Adults in Massachusetts
- Bay State Libraries, the MLA newsletter published quarterly (January, April, July, and October), focuses on items of interest to the association and to Massachusetts librarians in general.
- The MLA has developed a Library Use Value Calculator spreadsheet, which is used by many libraries throughout the United States.

== Committees ==
- Conference Committee
- Intellectual Freedom and Social Responsibilities Committee
- Jordan Miller Committee (annual storytelling program)
- Leadership and Management Section
- Legislative Committee
- Library Information Technologies Section
- Membership Committee
- Personnel & Education Committee
- Public Relations Committee

== Sections ==
- Technical Services Section
- Paralibrarian Section
- Youth Services Section

== Affiliated organizations ==
- Massachusetts Friends of Libraries (MFOL)
- Massachusetts Library Trustees Association
- The Massachusetts Board of Library Commissioners (MBLC)
- Massachusetts School Library Association (MSLA)
- American Library Association (ALA) (See also: Wikipedia article on the American Library Association)
- New England Library Association (NELA)
- Association of College and Research Libraries (ACRL)

== See also ==
- List of libraries in the United States
