= Provident Institution for Savings in the Town of Boston =

Coordinates: 42°21′30.79″N 71°3′35.23″W

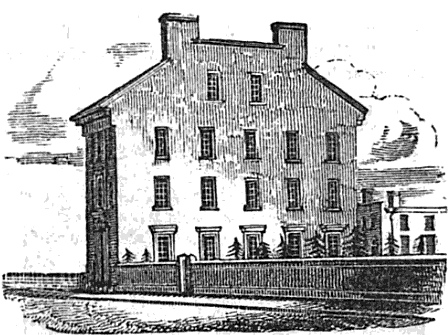
Provident Savings building (built 1833), adjacent to King's Chapel Burying Ground, Tremont Street, Boston, 1833-1856

The Provident Institution for Savings (est.1816) in Boston, Massachusetts, was the first chartered savings bank in the United States. James Savage and others founded the bank on the belief that "savings banks would enable the less fortunate classes of society to better themselves in a manner which would avoid the dangers of moral corruption traditionally associated with outright charitable institutions."

== History ==
=== 19th century ===
"The leading citizens of Boston ... felt that participation in the administration of the savings banks in their [city] was an integral part of their civic duties." Led by Savage, founders of the bank included William Ellery Channing, William Cochran, Thomas Dawes, Samuel Eliot, Jonathan Hunnewell, John Phillips, William Phillips, Jesse Putnam, Josiah Quincy, Richard Sullivan, Elisha Ticknor, Redford Webster. Boston's Catholic bishop, John Cheverus, provided significant start-up energy, since a savings bank would encourage virtuous thrifty behavior amongst his parishioners. Early meetings took place in the Exchange Coffee House. They agreed the "object of the institution" was "to provide a safe and profitable mode of enabling industrious persons of all descriptions to invest such parts of their earnings or property, as they can conveniently spare, in a manner which will afford them both profit and security.

In the first decades of its history, the Provident occupied several buildings in downtown Boston -- Court Street (ca.1817), in the courthouse; Scollay Square (1823–1833), in Scollay's building; Tremont Street (1833–1856), adjacent to King's Chapel Burying Ground; and Temple Place (beginning in 1856), in the former mansion of Thomas Handasyd Perkins.

At first, only people who lived in Boston or Charlestown were admitted as depositors. In 1822, the bank expanded its client base to include depositors from "Quincy, Milton, Dorchester, Dedham, Roxbury, Brookline, Waltham, Brighton, Newton, Weston, Cambridge, Watertown, West Cambridge, Medford, Saugus, Malden, and Chelsea." Although the Provident operated as a bank, in its early years it avoided the word "bank" "for the purpose of avoiding a certain sentiment of antipathy, which, at the time, appeared to be entertained toward the existing 'banks' by the common people." The amount of deposits increased dramatically through the years: deposits in 1820 totaled $233,034; in 1830, $986,959; in 1840, $2,071,095; and by 1900, $38,629,876.

Into the 19th century, the Provident's early spirit of civic benevolence and socio-economic inclusion may have diminished. According to one historian, the bank "sought large deposits, made timely loans to textile firms in which its directors were interested, and generally profiteered."

=== 20th century ===
In 1986 the Hartford National Corp. bought the Provident Institution for Savings in Boston for $87.2 million. "The Provident became a wholly owned subsidiary of Hartford National. However, The Provident, which is the fourth-largest savings bank in Massachusetts, will continue to operate under the name it has been using since 1816." The bank kept its original name through 1992. In 1993, the Provident was merged into Shawmut Bank.

== Images ==
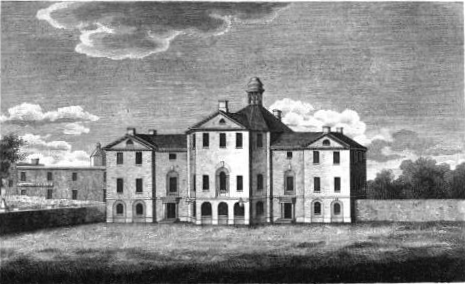
Courthouse, Court Square, where the Provident first kept offices, 1817

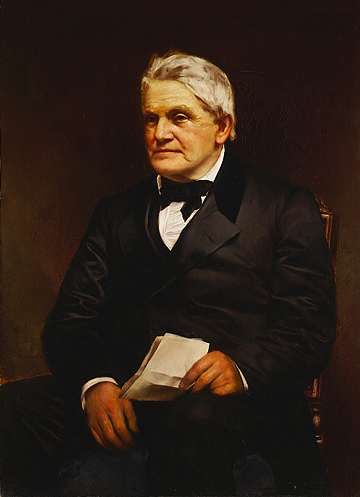
Portrait of founder James Savage (1784-1873), by David Dalhoff Neal 1886

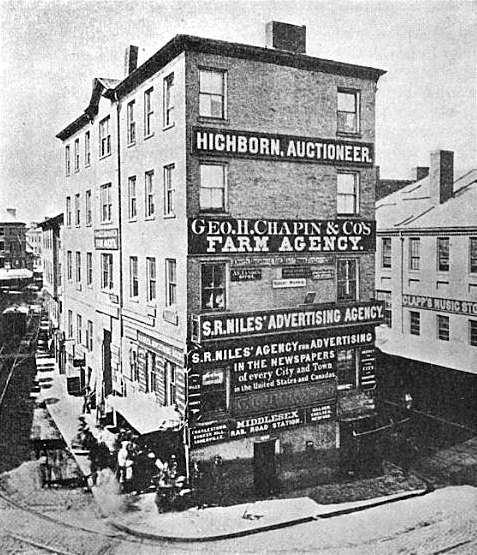
Scollay's Building, Scollay Square, Boston, where Provident Savings kept offices 1823-1833

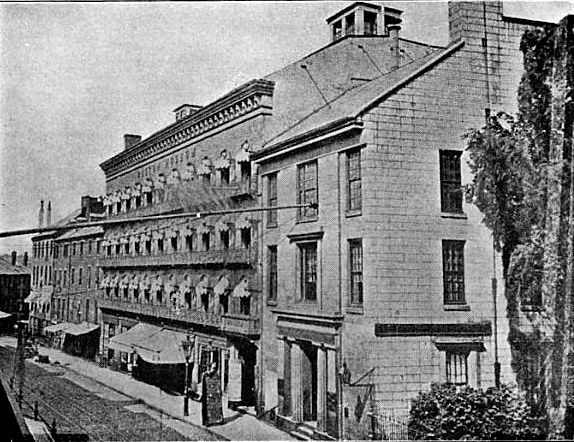
Provident Savings building (at right, next to the Boston Museum), Tremont Street, Boston, 1833-1856

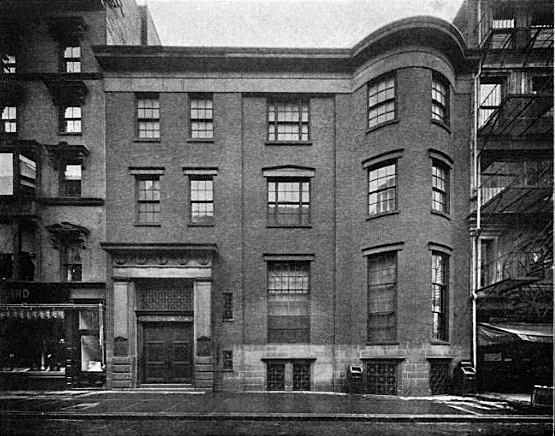
Former house of Thomas Handasyd Perkins, Temple Place, Boston, occupied by Provident Savings beginning in 1856
