= Elisha Ticknor =

- Born: March 25, 1757
- Died: June 22, 1821 (aged 64)

Elisha Ticknor (born March 25, 1757, in Lebanon, Connecticut) was an educator and merchant primarily in Boston, Massachusetts. He was the father of George Ticknor, who became a professor and renowned expert at Harvard University in the history and criticism of Spanish literature.

== Biography ==
In 1774, Ticknor's parents moved their family and farm from Lebanon, Connecticut, to Lebanon, New Hampshire, when he was around 17. After he graduated from Dartmouth College in 1783, Ticknor employed as a teacher at various schools. In 1788, he became headmaster of Franklin Grammar School in Boston. After filling this post for several years, he resigned on account of his health. He had married and had a family; his son George Ticknor later became known as an academic at Harvard University, developing its department in the study of Spanish literature and culture.

In 1795, Ticknor became a grocer in Boston. He did well enough to gain time to devote to civic and intellectual interests. He made one of the earliest efforts to improve female education in Massachusetts. He originated the scheme for public primary schools in Boston, proposing them at a town meeting in 1818. He founded the first insurance company in the city, Massachusetts Mutual Fire Insurance Company, and the first savings bank there, Provident Institution for Savings. In 1818, he presented a plan to prevent the causes and perfect the cure of pauperism in Boston. He stressed the importance of reducing illiteracy.

== Death ==
Ticknor peacefully died on June 22, 1821, in Hanover, New Hampshire.
