= Massachusetts Board of Library Commissioners =

Organization in Boston, United States

The Massachusetts Board of Library Commissioners (est.1890) is a state agency that supports libraries in Massachusetts. The governor appoints each commissioner.

== History ==
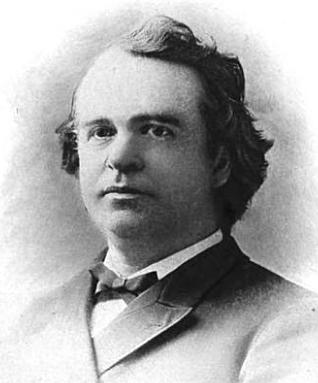
Caleb Benjamin Tillinghast, commissioner

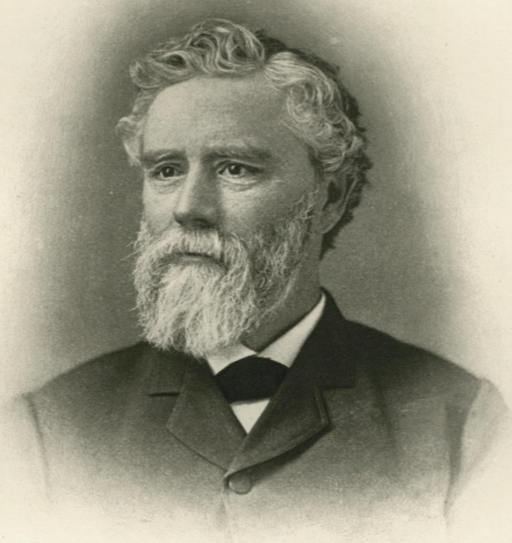
Henry S. Nourse, commissioner

The agency originated as the Massachusetts Free Public Library Commission "to encourage the establishment of libraries by direct aid and to give advice relating to the maintenance and administration of libraries" in Massachusetts. It was the first of its kind in the United States. In 1890, the board consisted of Caleb Benjamin Tillinghast, Samuel Swett Green, Henry Stedman Nourse, Elizabeth Putnam Sohier, and Anna E. Ticknor. Elizabeth Putnam Sohier and Anna Eliot Ticknor became the first women appointed to a United States state library agency when they were appointed to the agency in 1890. Other early members of the commission included Mabel Simpkins Agassiz, Anna Sears Amory, Deloraine P. Corey.

In its first years of existence, the board accomplished significant fulfillment of its mission. In 1890 "105 towns in the Commonwealth were without a free public library. Twenty years later, in 1910, every city and town, with one exception, had a library of its own."

The name of the agency changed in 1952 from the "Massachusetts Board of Free Public Library Commissioners" to the "Massachusetts Board of Library Commissioners." As of the 1990s it was "responsible for library development and resource sharing." As of 2010, "the Massachusetts Board of Library Commissioners is the agency of state government with the statutory authority and responsibility to organize, develop, coordinate and improve library services throughout the Commonwealth. The Board also strives to provide every resident of the Commonwealth with full and equal access to library information resources regardless of geographic location, social or economic status, age, level of physical or intellectual ability, or cultural background." It operates from offices in Boston's North End.

== See also ==
- Massachusetts Library System, funded by MBLC
- Massachusetts Board of Library Commissioners, hdl:2452/35873 – via State Library of Massachusetts electronic repository. (Various documents).
- List of public libraries in Massachusetts
- Public library movement
