= George Loring =

George Loring may refer to:

- George B. Loring (1817–1891), U.S. Representative from Massachusetts
- George F. Loring (1851–1918), American architect based in Boston, Massachusetts
  - George Loring House, a historic building in Somerville, Massachusetts

== See also ==
- Loring (surname)
