= Donald MacDonald (stained glass) =

American stained glass designer (1841–1916)

Donald MacDonald (1841–1916) was a leading stained glass artisan and designer in 19th century Boston. Born Donald McDonald, he altered the spelling of his surname to "MacDonald" around 1877.

== Early life ==
Born in 1841, the son of a Scottish farmer, in the Gorbals district of Glasgow, MacDonald was trained as a glass painter in London. By 1863, he was a partner in the London firm of McMillan & McDonald of Camden Town, furnishing stained glass for the New Stepney Meetinghouse (destroyed) in the Tower Hamlets district of East London. In 1868, he settled in Boston, probably at the urging of William Robert Ware (1832–1915), founder of the school of architecture at the Massachusetts Institute of Technology. Ware was instrumental in MacDonald's early career in Boston, providing professional introductions and commissions, using samples of MacDonald's glass work to illustrate his lectures and commending MacDonald publicly for his efforts to improve the art of stained glass in the U.S.

== Boston career ==
In Boston, MacDonald was first employed with J.M. Cook's Boston Stained & Cut Glass Works. In 1872, he entered into partnership with William J. McPherson (1821–1900), a leading decorative painter and interior designer, for whom he organized a stained glass department within the firm of W.J. McPherson Co. In collaboration with McPherson, MacDonald produced delicately hand painted decorative glazing ensembles, often on a monumental scale. Among these were the Harvard College Appleton Chapel renovations in 1873 (destroyed) for Peabody & Stearns and Harvard Memorial Hall in 1874 for Ware & Van Brunt. As early as 1872, he introduced "doubling" or layering glass for decorative and pictorial effect in a memorial window depicting "Charity and Devotion" at St. Anne's Episcopal Church in Lowell, Massachusetts. At the direction of Ware and McPherson, he collaborated with John La Farge (1835–1910) on a number of experimental works and in 1874 produced the first opalescent picture window for Harvard's Memorial Hall (now lost). In 1876, the partnership with McPherson ended in financial dispute. In the following year, he organized "MacDonald & Co, Decorators and Specialists in Stained Glass." It was around this time that he altered the spelling of his name.

Initially favoring English glass imported from Hartley of Sunderland and Powell of London, MacDonald was dedicated to the vitreous properties of his medium rather than painterly or illusionistic effect. This aligned him with Boston's leading glass makers during the 1870s and 80s, including Page Harding & Co. and the Berkshire Glass Company. MacDonald expressed his particular vitreous sensibility in 1875. In an interview by local glass manufacturer Thomas Gaffield (1825–1900), when questioned about the awkward interior lighting effects sometimes created by a decorative window, he stated that he tried "to induce people to let the glass remain in its full beauty, undimmed by any enamel and if the sun troubled them to place curtains in the window and to pull them down until the light ceased to trouble them." MacDonald's abilities as a collaborator along with his skill and sensitivity as an artisan appealed to rational thinking and liberal minded architects and designers. In addition to Ware & Van Brunt and McPherson, these included Frederic Crowninshield (1845–1918), professor of decorative art at the school of the Boston Museum of Fine arts; the architectural firm of Rotch & Tilden of Boston; and H. Langford Warren (1857–1917), founder of the Harvard school of architecture and a leader in the Boston Society of Arts & Crafts. MacDonald also developed a close relationship with the Italian artist, Tomasso Juglaris (1844–1925), who designed figures for MacDonald's later work and introduced him to the cosmopolitan and avant-garde style of the Italian Macchiaioli movement.

After the turn of the century, MacDonald's eldest daughter Flora (1869–1925), a student of Juglaris and the art school at South Kensington in London, became a leading force in MacDonald & Co. Also joining the firm was his son Donald Newton MacDonald (1877–1924), who was also head of the stained glass lamp department at Bigelow Kennard & Co. of Boston. In 1897, MacDonald participated in the first exhibition of the Boston Society of Arts & Crafts, although he did not become a member until 1907. In the following year he was elevated to the membership status of "Master." After Flora became established as an interior decorator, MacDonald retired and closed his studio in 1915.

On December 24, 1916 he died at his home in Newtonville, Massachusetts. He is interred at the Mount Auburn Cemetery in Cambridge, Massachusetts.

Most of his works are concentrated in Boston and the northeast, including windows for a number of high style "cottages" in Newport, Rhode Island. Other work is found in churches across the country.

== Selected works ==
- St. John's Chapel (1869), Episcopal Divinity School, Cambridge, Massachusetts, Boston Stained & Cut Glass Works, manufacturer.
- First Parish Unitarian Church (1869), Taunton, Massachusetts, Boston Stained & Cut Glass Works, manufacturer.
- Charity and Devotion Window (1872–73), St. Anne's Episcopal Church, Lowell, Massachusetts, W.J. McPherson Company, manufacturer.
- Memorial Hall, Harvard University, Cambridge, Massachusetts, Ware & Van Brunt, architects.
  - Virtues Window (1874), W.J. McPherson Company, manufacturer.
  - Veritas Window (West Window) (1874), W.J. McPherson Company, manufacturer.
  - Pericles and Leonardo Window (1882), MacDonald & Company, manufacturer, with Frederic Crowninshield.
  - Sophocles and Shakespeare Window (1883), MacDonald & Company, manufacturer, with Frederic Crowninshield.
- Library coved ceiling and dome (1882), National Arts Club, Manhattan, New York City, MacDonald & Company, manufacturer. Commissioned by Governor Samuel J. Tilden, when the Gramercy Park building was his city house.
- The Sower Window (1882), Channing Memorial Church, Newport, Rhode Island, MacDonald & Company, manufacturer.
- Arnot Memorial Chapel (1882), Trinity Church, Elmira, New York, MacDonald & Company, manufacturer.
- Newton Presbyterian Church (1883), Newton, Massachusetts, MacDonald & Company, manufacturer. The building was formerly Channing Memorial Church, Newton.
- Rollins Chapel, Dartmouth College, Hanover, New Hampshire, MacDonald & Company, manufacturer.
  - Moses (1885), President Nathan Lord Memorial Window, transept.
  - Saint James (1885), President Asa Dodge Smith Memorial Window, transept.
  - Paul the Apostle (1885), President Bennet Tyler Memorial Window, chancel.
- Flint Public Library (1891–92), Middleton, Massachusetts, MacDonald & Company, manufacturer.
- H. Langford Warren Memorial Window (1902), Church of the New Jerusalem, Cambridge, Massachusetts, MacDonald & Company, manufacturer.
- First Congregational Church, Detroit, Michigan.
- First Presbyterian Church, Knoxville, Tennessee.
- Trinity United Methodist Church, Salisbury, Maryland.
- First Unitarian Church, Oakland, California.
- Church of the Holy City, Washington, D.C.
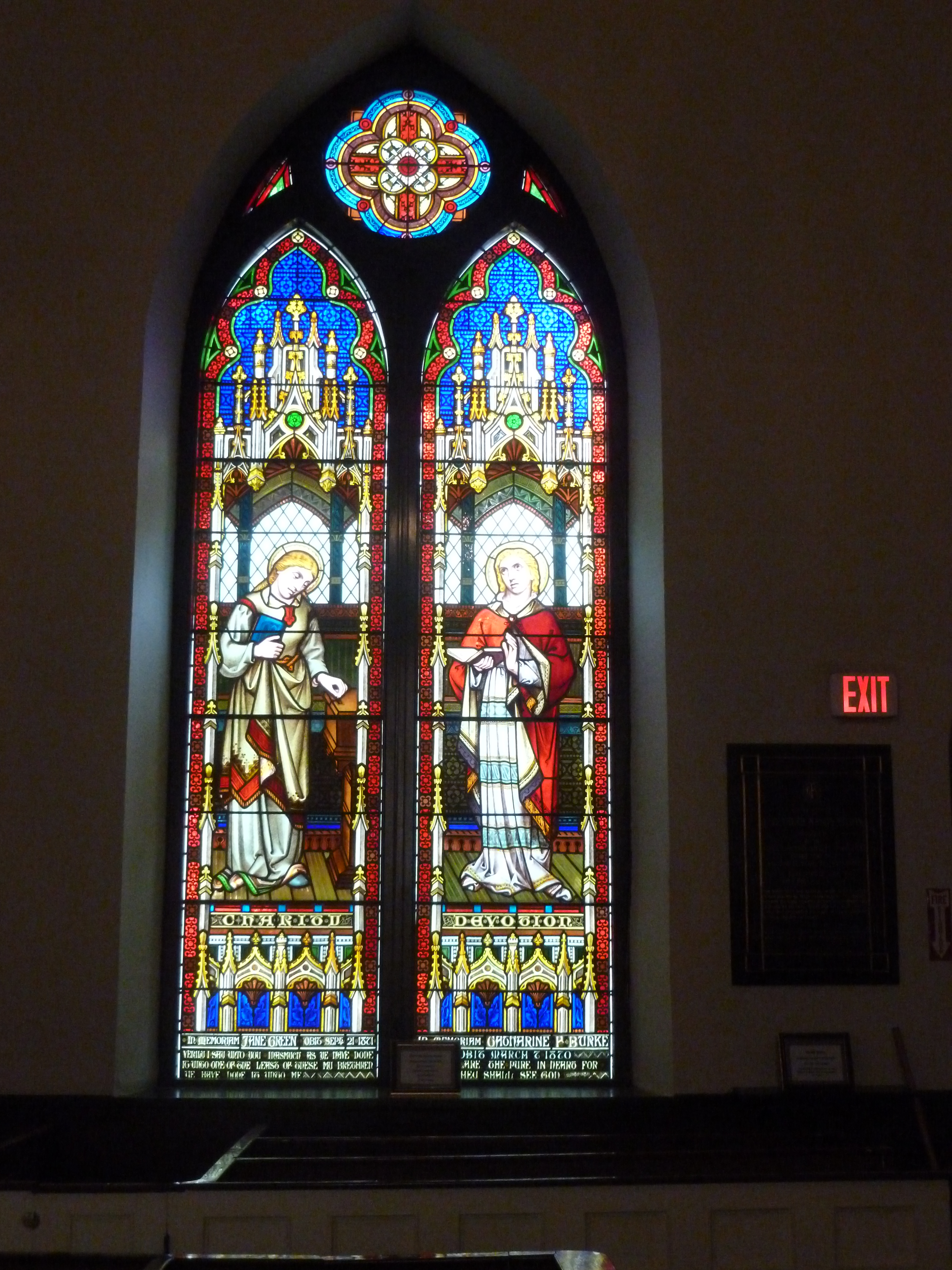
Charity and Devotion Window (1872–73), Saint Anne's Episcopal Church, Lowell, Massachusetts.

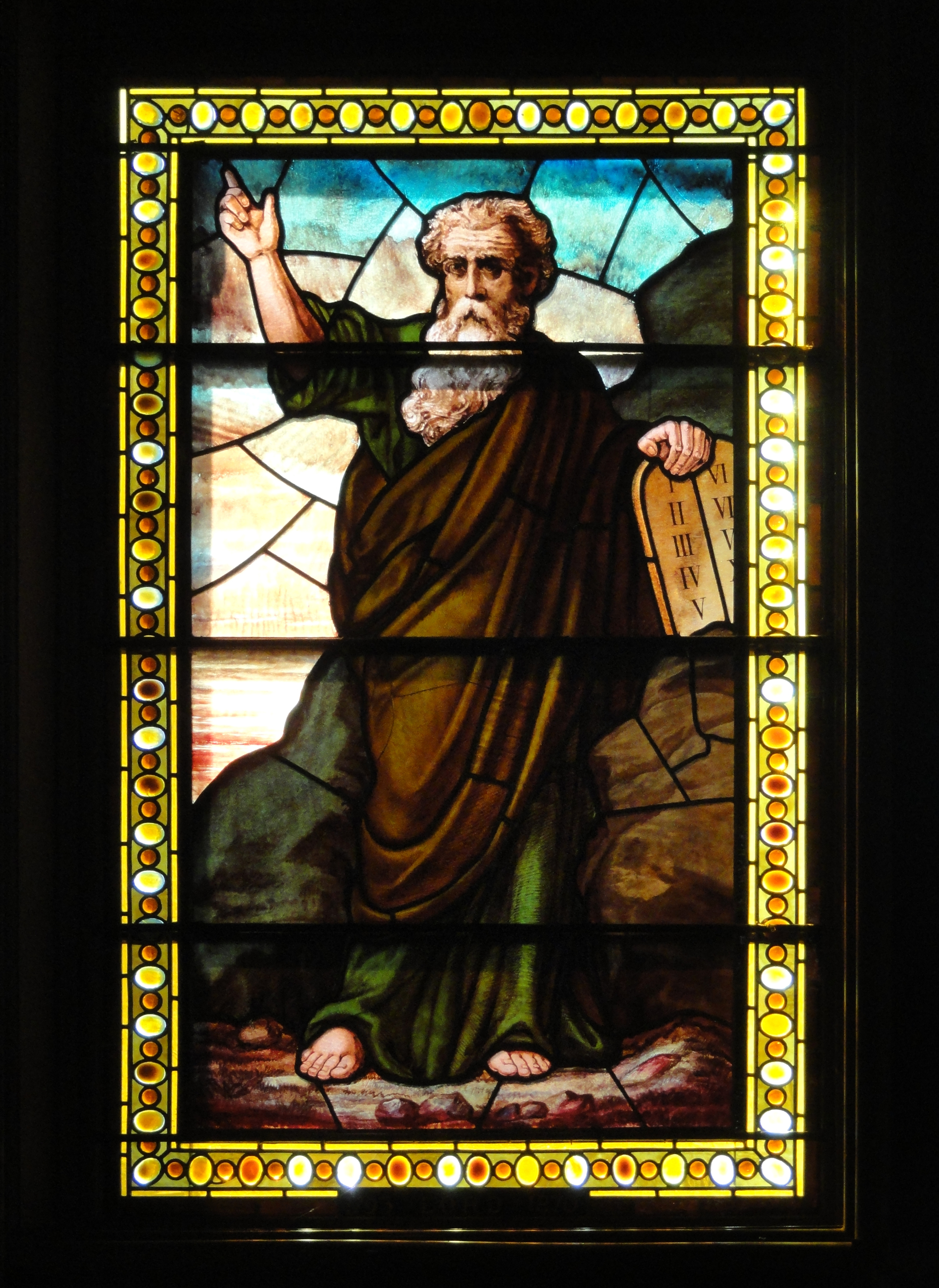
Moses (1885), Dartmouth College.

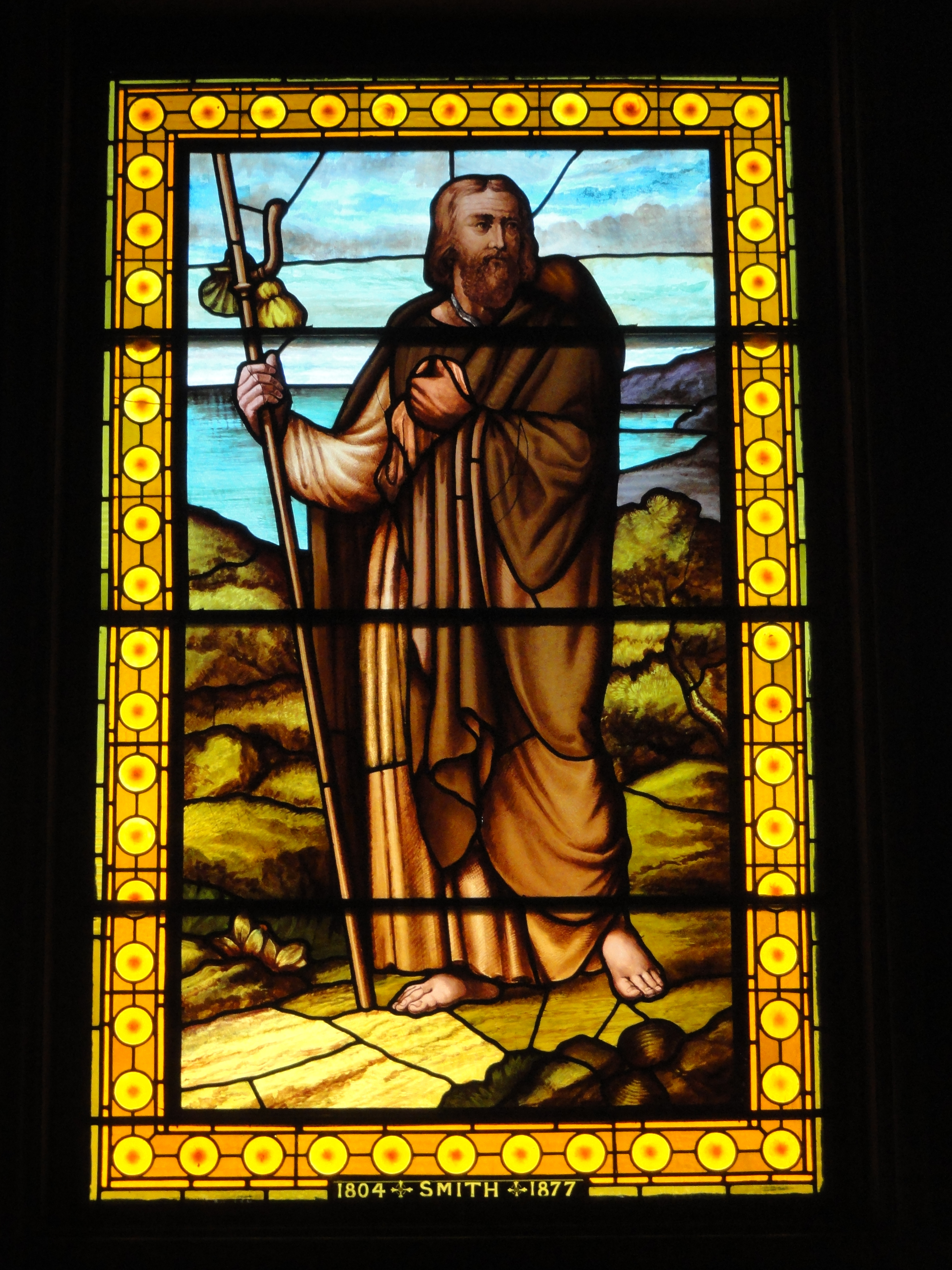
Saint James the Greater (1885), Dartmouth College.

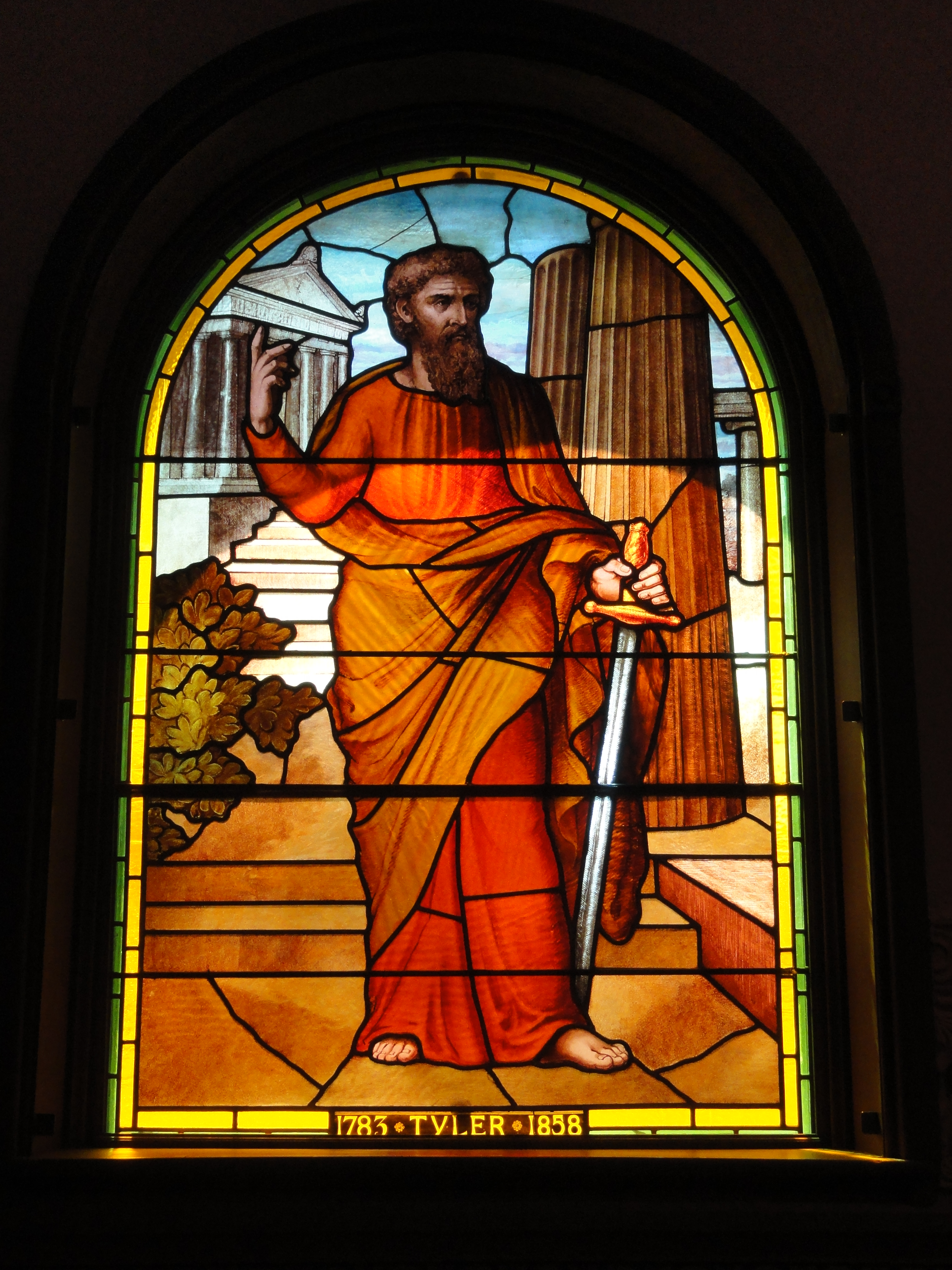
Paul the Apostle, Dartmouth College.

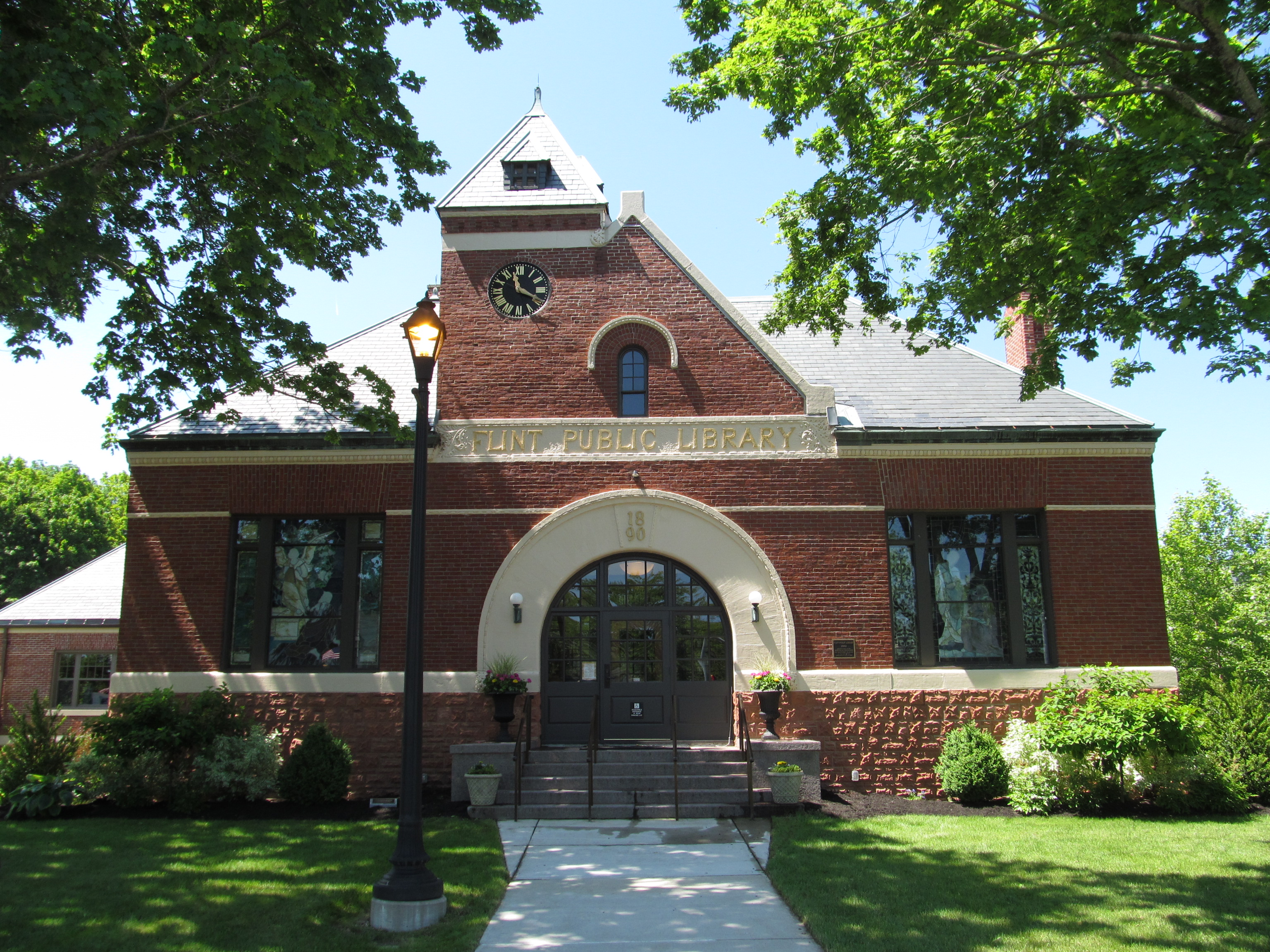
Flint Public Library (1891–92), Middleton, Massachusetts. MacDonald designed the stained glass windows at left & right.
