= Central Library (Somerville, Massachusetts) =

- U.S. National Register of Historic Places
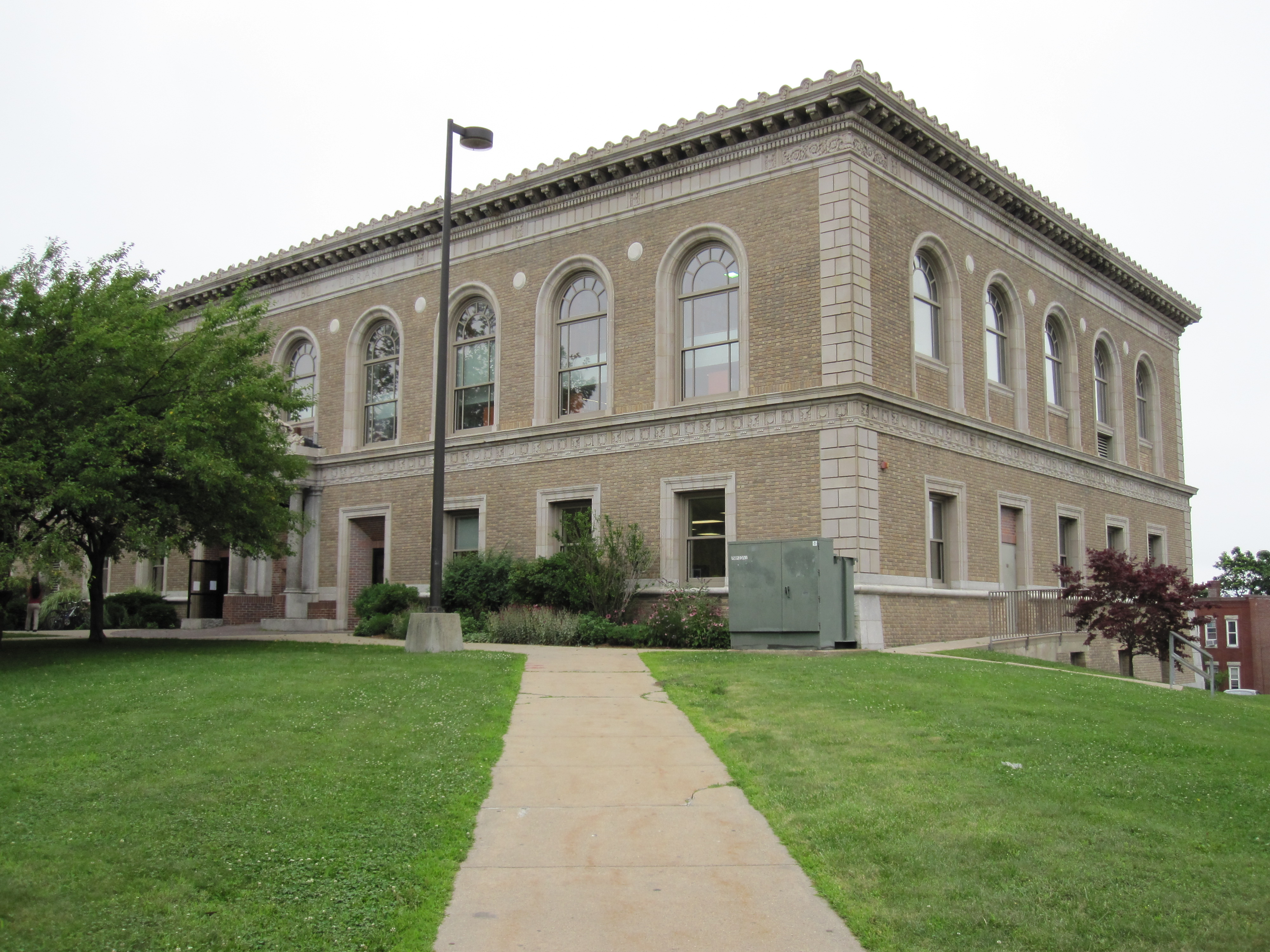

- Location within Massachusetts Location within the United States
- Location: 79 Highland Avenue, Somerville, Massachusetts
- Coordinates: 42°23′9″N 71°5′40″W
- Built: 1914
- Architect: Edward Lippincott Tilton
- Architectural style: Late 19th And 20th Century Revivals
- MPS: Somerville MPS
- NRHP reference No.: 89001274
- Added to NRHP: September 18, 1989

The Central Library is the main branch of the Somerville, Massachusetts, public library system. It is an architecturally distinguished Renaissance Revival brick building designed by Edward Lippincott Tilton and was built in 1914 with funding assistance from philanthropist Andrew Carnegie. The building was listed on the National Register of Historic Places in 1989.

== Services ==
The library is a member of the Minuteman Library Network and has a lending collection of books, CDs, and video media. It also provides access to a number of online databases, either in-branch or through the Internet, to city residents. It runs a variety of programs for adults, children, and immigrants, and has a conference room and other facilities available for community use.

== Architecture and history ==
Somerville's Central Library is located at the eastern end of Central Hill, a cluster of civic buildings that includes the city's high school and City Hall. It is located at the northwest corner of Highland Avenue and Walnut Street, on a parcel that first contained the city's first fire station. Noted library architect Edward Lippincott Tilton designed the two story Renaissance Revival building, which was completed in 1914. The yellow brick building is topped by a truncated hip roof made of green tile. The second story has nine bays of high round-arched windows. The building is trimmed with limestone and terra cotta panels, and its entry is sheltered by a columned porch topped by an elaborate terra cotta shield.

The city's first library, also a Romanesque structure, was built on the west side of Central Hill, near City Hill, and was designed by George F. Loring. The present building was funded in part by a grant from philanthropist Andrew Carnegie.

== Gallery ==
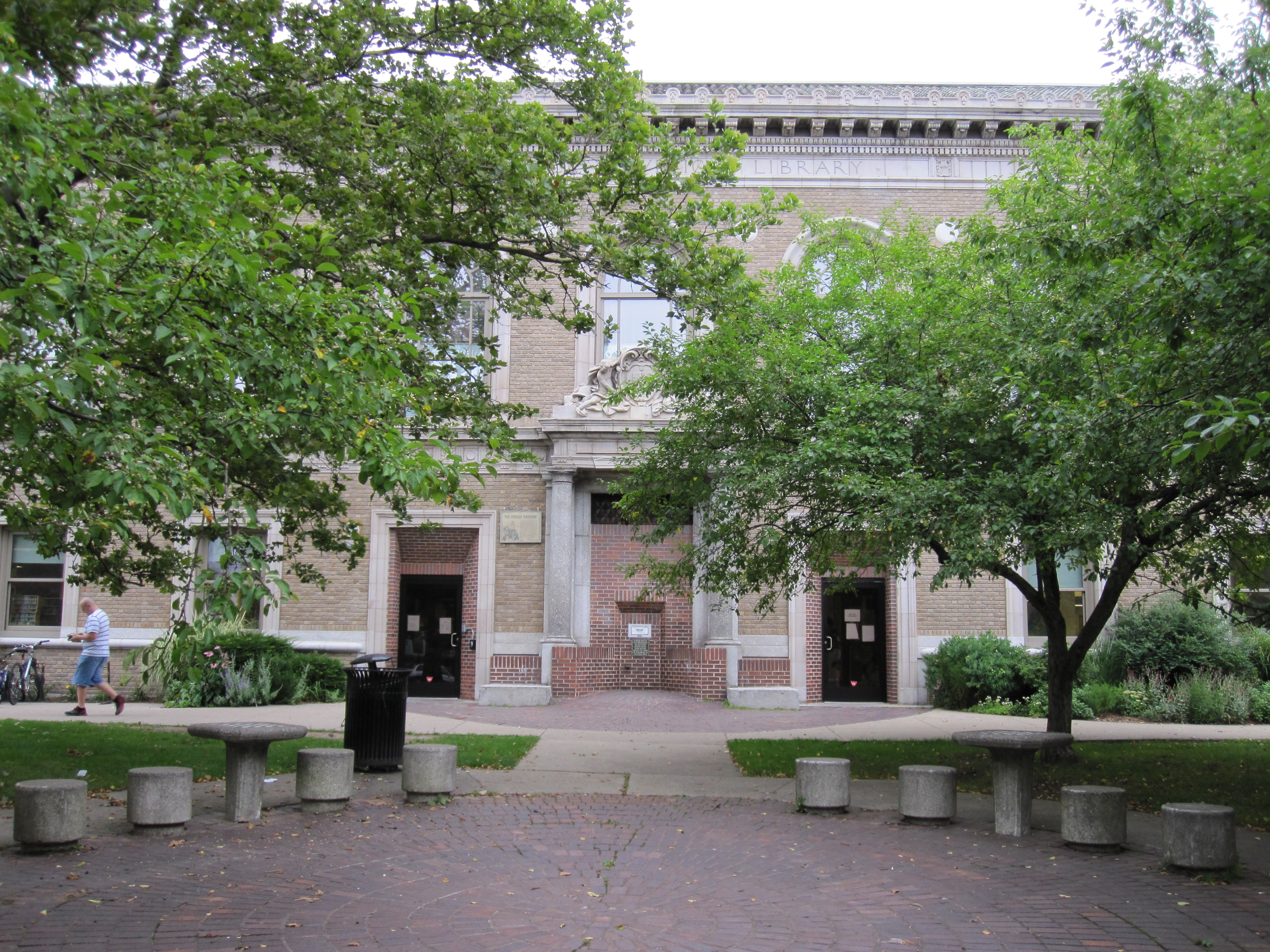
Main entrance

== See also ==
- West Somerville Branch Library
- List of Carnegie libraries in Massachusetts
- National Register of Historic Places listings in Somerville, Massachusetts
