= William H. McElwain School =

- U.S. National Register of Historic Places
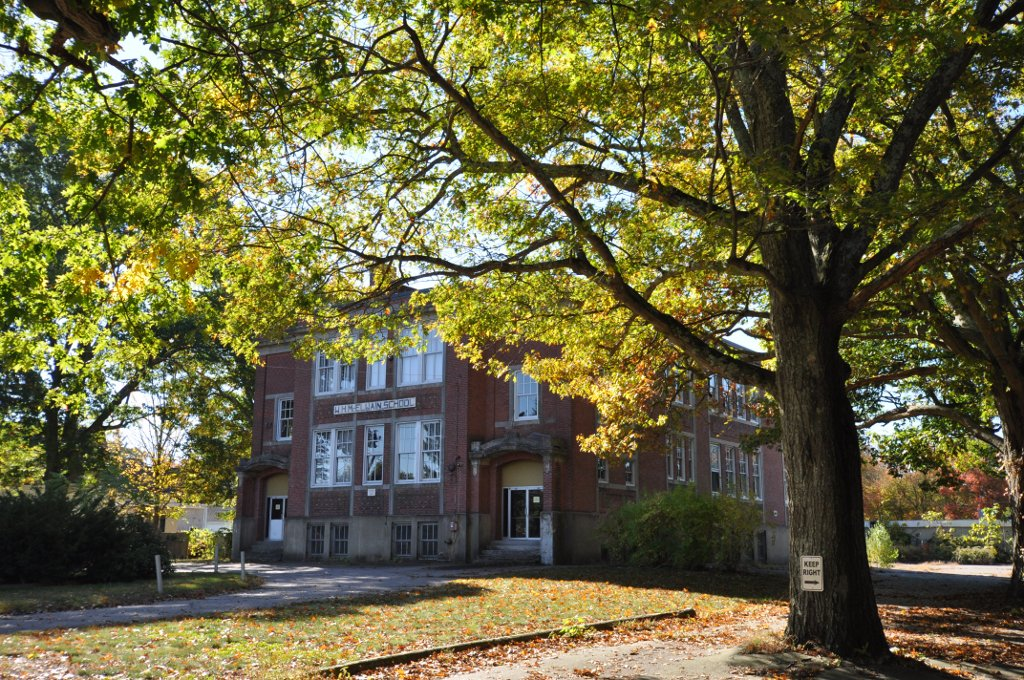

- Location within Massachusetts Location within the United States
- Location: 250 Main Street, Bridgewater, Massachusetts
- Coordinates: 41°59′44″N 70°58′53″W
- Built: 1912
- Architect: Loring & Phipps
- Architectural style: Classical Revival
- NRHP reference No.: 12001170
- Added to NRHP: January 14, 2013

The William H. McElwain School is a historic school building at 250 Main Street in Bridgewater, Massachusetts. The two story brick Classical Revival building was built in 1912 to a design by the architectural firm of Loring & Phipps. The school was named for William H. McElwain (1867-1908), the founder of the William H. McElwain Shoe Company, a shoe manufacturer who was one of the major employers in Bridgewater at the turn of the 20th century. The school's construction was approved by the town shortly before workers in the firm's Bridgewater factory went on strike. Despite this, the town accepted land in donation from McElwain's family on which to build the school, and named it in his honor. It served as a public school until 1997, and has sat vacant since then. The school is believed to be the best-preserved school building in Massachusetts designed by Loring & Phipps.

The building was listed on the National Register of Historic Places in 2013.

== See also ==
- National Register of Historic Places listings in Plymouth County, Massachusetts
