= Lieut. Thomas Fuller House =

Historic house in Massachusetts, United States

- U.S. National Register of Historic Places
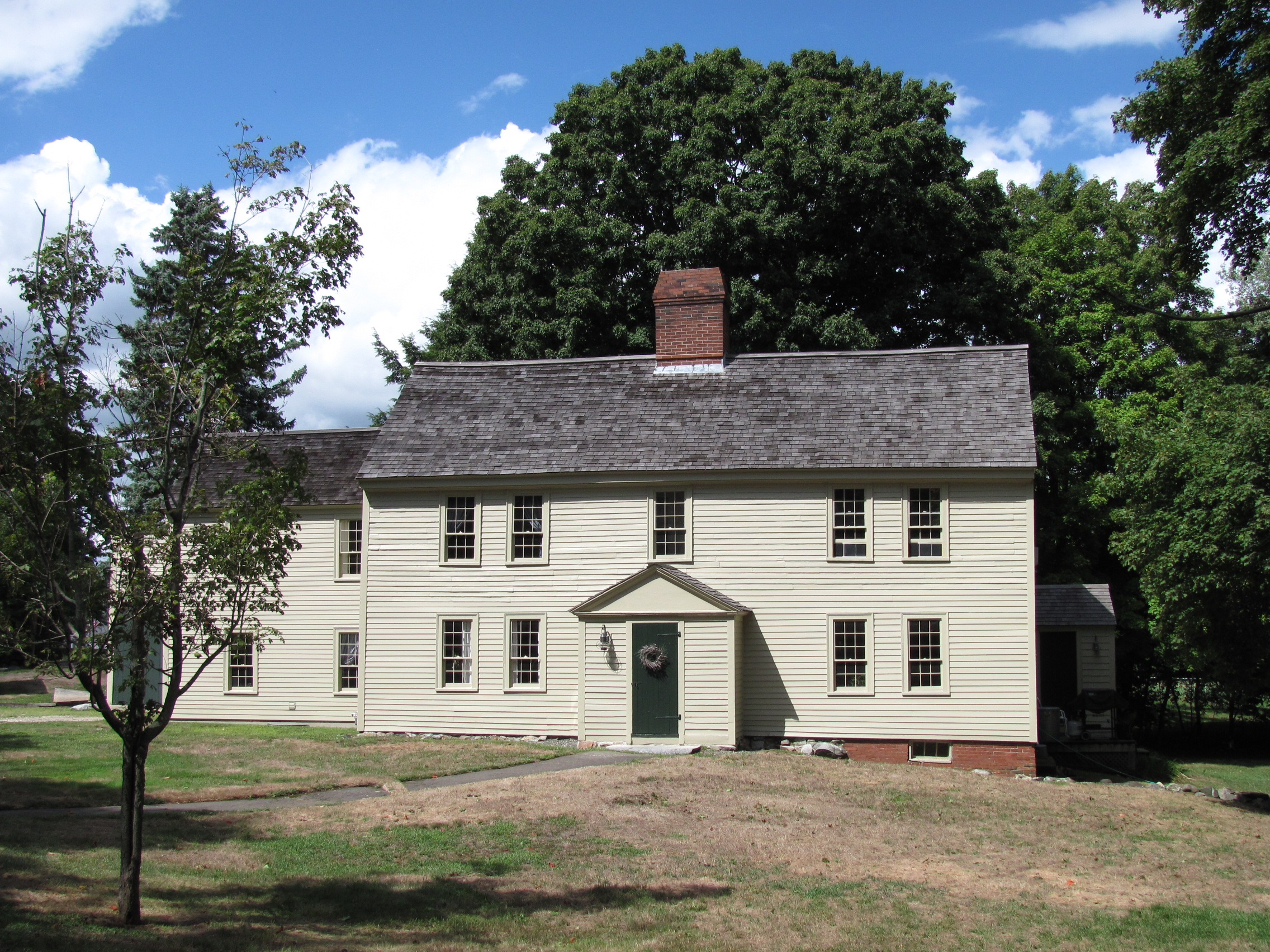
- Thomas Fuller House

- Location within Massachusetts Location within the United States
- Location: 6 Old South Main Street, Middleton, Massachusetts
- Coordinates: 42°35′31.6″N 71°0′48.8″W
- Built: 1684
- Architectural style: Colonial
- MPS: First Period Buildings of Eastern Massachusetts TR
- NRHP reference No.: 90000242
- Added to NRHP: March 9, 1990

The Lieut. Thomas Fuller House is a historic First Period house in Middleton, Massachusetts. The oldest portion of the house, two stories of rooms either side of a central chimney, was built c. 1684 by Thomas Fuller. By 1690 a leanto section (which may have surviving elements still in the house) was added to the house. The leanto was raised to a full second story in the 19th century. Later shed roofed additions extend further off the back of the house, and a small gabled addition extends over the eastern end of the leanto section.

The house was listed on the National Register of Historic Places in 1990.

== See also ==
- National Register of Historic Places listings in Essex County, Massachusetts
