= Flint Public Library =

- U.S. National Register of Historic Places
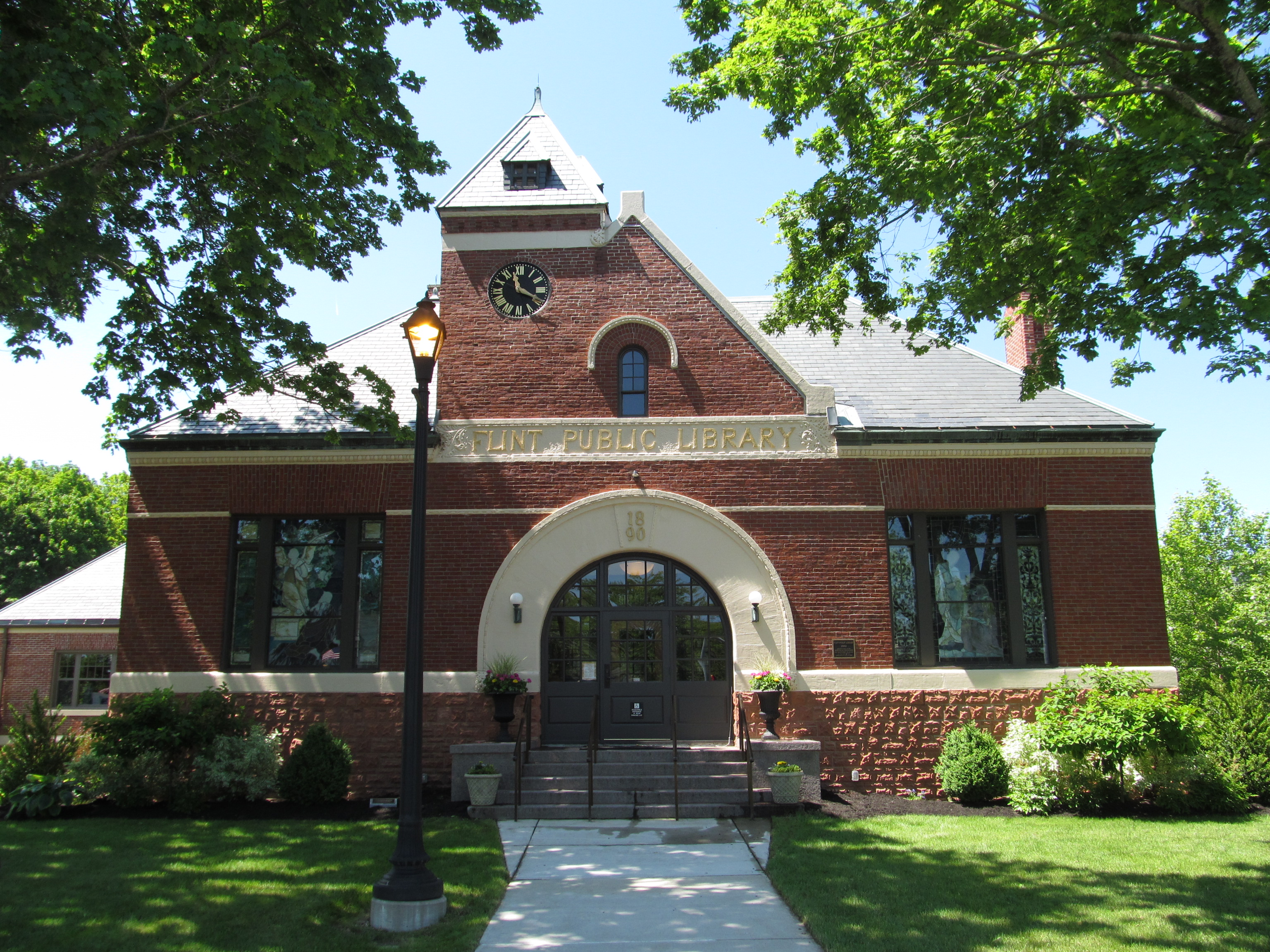
- Flint Public Library

- Location within Massachusetts Location within the United States
- Location: Middleton, Massachusetts
- Coordinates: 42°35′41″N 71°1′1″W
- Area: 1 acre (0.40 ha)
- Built: 1890
- Built by: Smith & Meany
- Architect: Loring & Phipps
- Architectural style: Romanesque
- NRHP reference No.: 02000631
- Added to NRHP: June 14, 2002

The Charles Flint Public Library is the public library of Middleton, Massachusetts, United States. It is located in a Richardsonian Romanesque building at 1 South Main Street in the center of the town. The building, the only Romanesque building in Middleton, was listed on the National Register of Historic Places in 2002.

== Description and history ==
The Flint Public Library is set on the west side of South Main Street (Massachusetts Route 114) in Middleton's town center. It is a 1 1/2-story brick structure, set on a granite foundation, with a slate hip roof. The front facade is dominated by its entrance at the center, which is outlined in light-colored sandstone. Above this is a front-facing gable, whose left side is interrupted by a square tower topped by a pyramidal roof. The tower houses a Howard clock in working condition. A wing extends to the rear of the main block, housing most of the book stacks.

Middleton's first library collection was established in 1772 as a private lending collection. Middleton native Charles L. Flint in 1879 offered the town funding and a seed collection of books to establish a public library. This initial collection was merged with the private collection and was initially housed in a room in town hall. After Flint's death in 1889, the town received a $10,000 bequest from his estate. The resulting building was designed by George F. Loring and Sanford Phipps, regional architects known for their public buildings, and was completed in 1891. The building's stained glass windows were designed by the Glasgow-born artist Donald MacDonald.

== See also ==
- National Register of Historic Places listings in Essex County, Massachusetts
