= George F. Loring =

American architect

George Fullington Loring
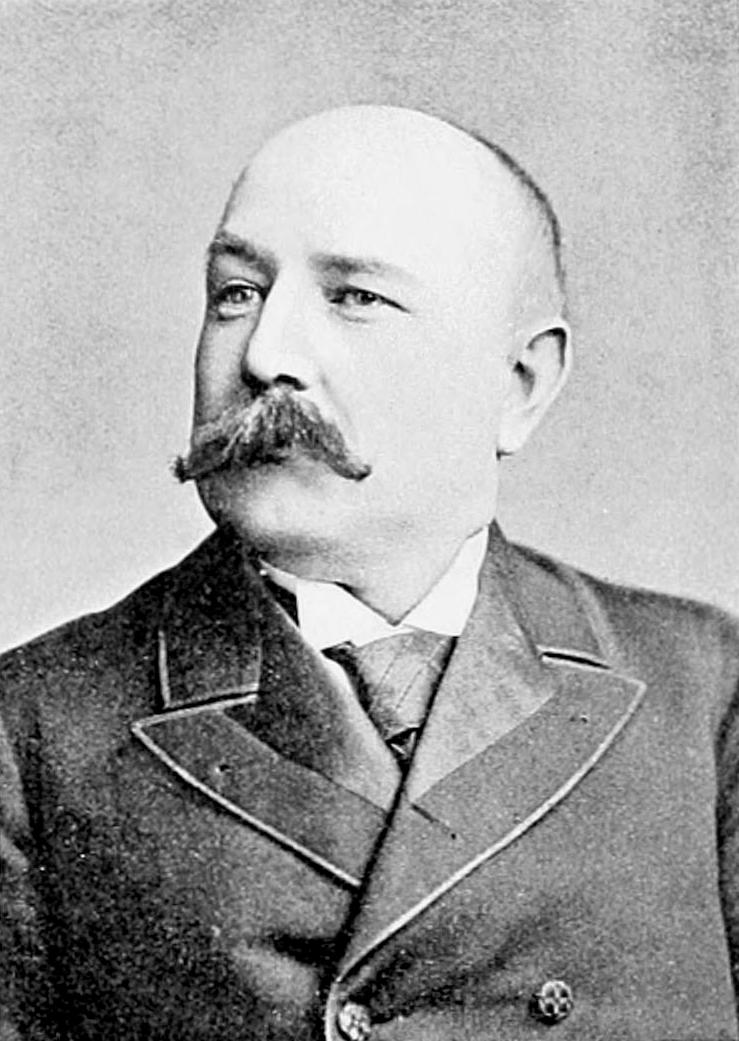
- George F. Loring, circa 1896
- Born: March 26, 1851; Boston, Massachusetts
- Died: February 1, 1918 (aged 66); Somerville, Massachusetts
- Occupation: Architect

George Fullington Loring (1851–1918) was an architect from Boston, Massachusetts.

== Life and career ==
George Fullington Loring was born March 26, 1851, in Boston to George and Harriet Abba (Stoodley) Loring. He was educated in the public schools, with supplementary classes in the free drawing school of the Lowell Institute under the direction of George Hollingsworth. From 1868 to 1882 he was employed in the city surveyor's office of Boston. From 1882 to 1884 he was employed in the office of architect George A. Clough. In the latter year Loring established his own architecture practice. In 1889 he formed a partnership with Sanford Phipps, formerly employed in the Boston office of Worcester architect Stephen C. Earle. The firm of Loring & Phipps became notable, in particular, for their designs for large school buildings throughout the northeast United States.

This partnership continued until Loring's death in 1918. Phipps continued to practice until his own death in 1921.

== Personal life ==
Loring was a descendant of Thomas Loring of Hingham.

Loring married in 1873 to Sarah Frances Johnson of Somerville, a descendant of Edward Johnson of Woburn. The couple lived in Somerville, from 1895 occupying a large family home built from Loring's design. They had four children. Both of their sons followed their father into the business. His eldest son, Ernest Johnson Loring (1874-1926), attended the architectural school of the Massachusetts Institute of Technology, graduating in 1895. He worked for his father's firm from them until 1901, and for Earle & Fisher until 1902, before changing careers. Their third child, Ralph Stoodley Loring (1879-1948), also attended MIT and would go on to be an architect of some note in Idaho and California.

Loring was prominent in Masonic circles, and was architect of the Masonic Temple in Boston and the Masonic Apartments in Somerville. He was also a founding member of the Somerville Historical Society, now the Somerville Museum, in 1898. Mrs. Loring was also a member of the society.

Loring died February 1, 1918, in Somerville at the age of 66. He was a distant relative of fellow Boston architect Charles Greely Loring, partner of Joseph D. Leland in the firm of Loring & Leland.

== Legacy ==
A number of buildings designed by Loring, alone and in association with Sanford Phipps, have been listed on the United States National Register of Historic Places. Others contribute to listed historic districts.

== Architectural works ==
- Somerville Public Library (former), Somerville, Massachusetts (1884, demolished)
- Odd Fellows Building, Somerville, Massachusetts (1885, demolished)
- Stickney Building and Masonic Apartments, Somerville, Massachusetts (1888, demolished)
- Flint Public Library, Middleton, Massachusetts (1890–91, NRHP 2002)
- Miner Hall and Paige Hall, Tufts University, Medford, Massachusetts (1891–92)
- Athol High School (former), Athol, Massachusetts (1892, demolished)
- Edward Devotion School, Brookline, Massachusetts (1892–93 and 1898–99, demolished 1953 and 1974)
- Everett High School (former), Everett, Massachusetts (1892–93 and 1905)
- Havemeyer School (former), Greenwich, Connecticut (1892)
- Montclair High School (former), Montclair, New Jersey (1892, demolished)
- Ware High School (former), Ware, Massachusetts (1893)
- George W. Durell School (former), Somerville, Massachusetts (1894)
- Glenfield School, Montclair, New Jersey (1895–96)
- Gilbert School (former), (Note: Now a building of the Northwestern Connecticut Community College.) Winsted, Connecticut (1895)
- Hopkinton Public Library, Hopkinton, Massachusetts (1895)
- House for George F. Loring, Somerville, Massachusetts (1895, NRHP 1989)
- Masonic Temple, Boston, Massachusetts (1897–99)
- Weymouth High School, Weymouth, Massachusetts (1898, burned and demolished 1971)
- Stoneham High School (former), (Note: More recently known as Central School.) Stoneham, Massachusetts (1900–01)
- Athens School (former), Weymouth, Massachusetts (1901–02)
- Hyde Park High School (former), (Note: More recently the William Barton Rogers School.) Hyde Park, Boston, Massachusetts (1902)
- Westerly High School (former), Westerly, Rhode Island (1902–03, demolished)
- Stoneham Public Library, Stoneham, Massachusetts (1904, NRHP 1984)
- Clubhouse, Brae Burn Country Club, West Newton, Massachusetts (1905)
- Harvard School, Harvard, Massachusetts (1905, demolished)
- Walpole High School, Walpole, Massachusetts (1907)
- Everett Central Fire Station, Everett, Massachusetts (1908)
- Masonic Building, Everett, Massachusetts (1910)
- Chapel, Woodlawn Cemetery, Everett, Massachusetts (1911)
- William H. McElwain School, Bridgewater, Massachusetts (1912, NRHP 2013)
- Burlington Town Hall (former), Burlington, Massachusetts (1915, demolished)

== Gallery of architectural works ==
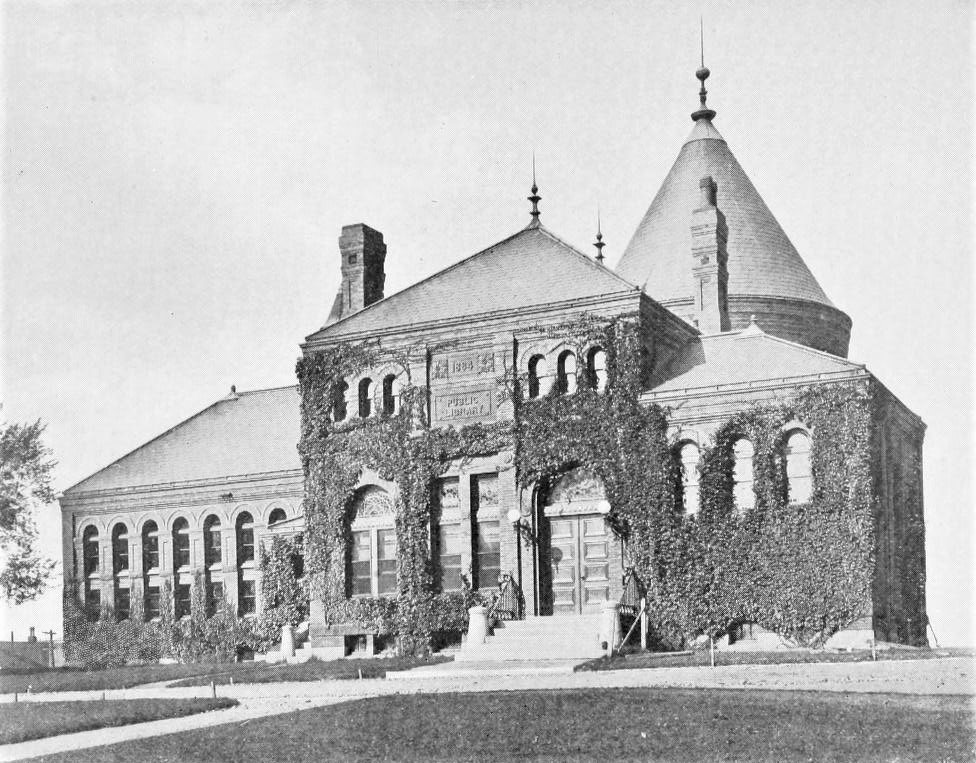
Somerville Public Library, Somerville, Massachusetts, 1884.

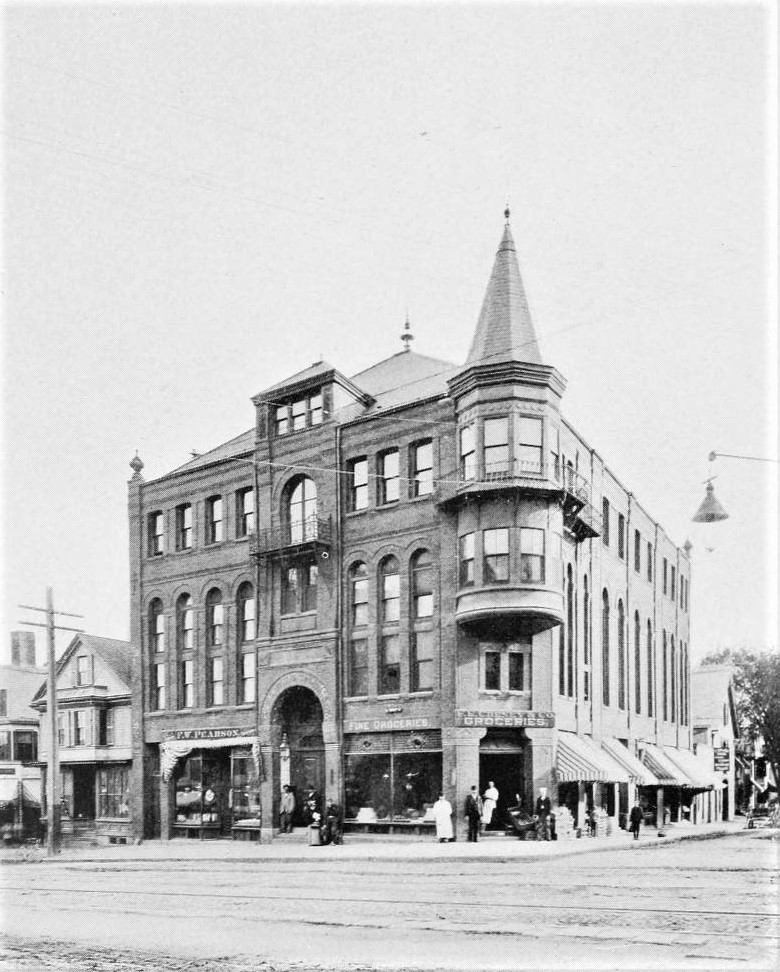
Odd Fellows Building, Somerville, Massachusetts, 1885.

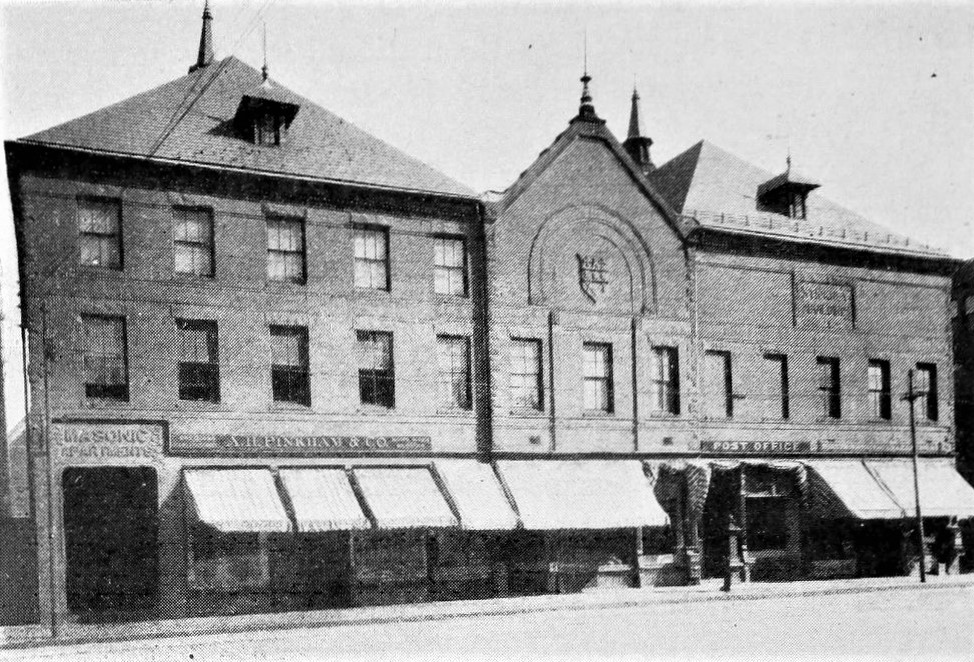
Stickney Building and Masonic Apartments, Somerville, Massachusetts, 1888.

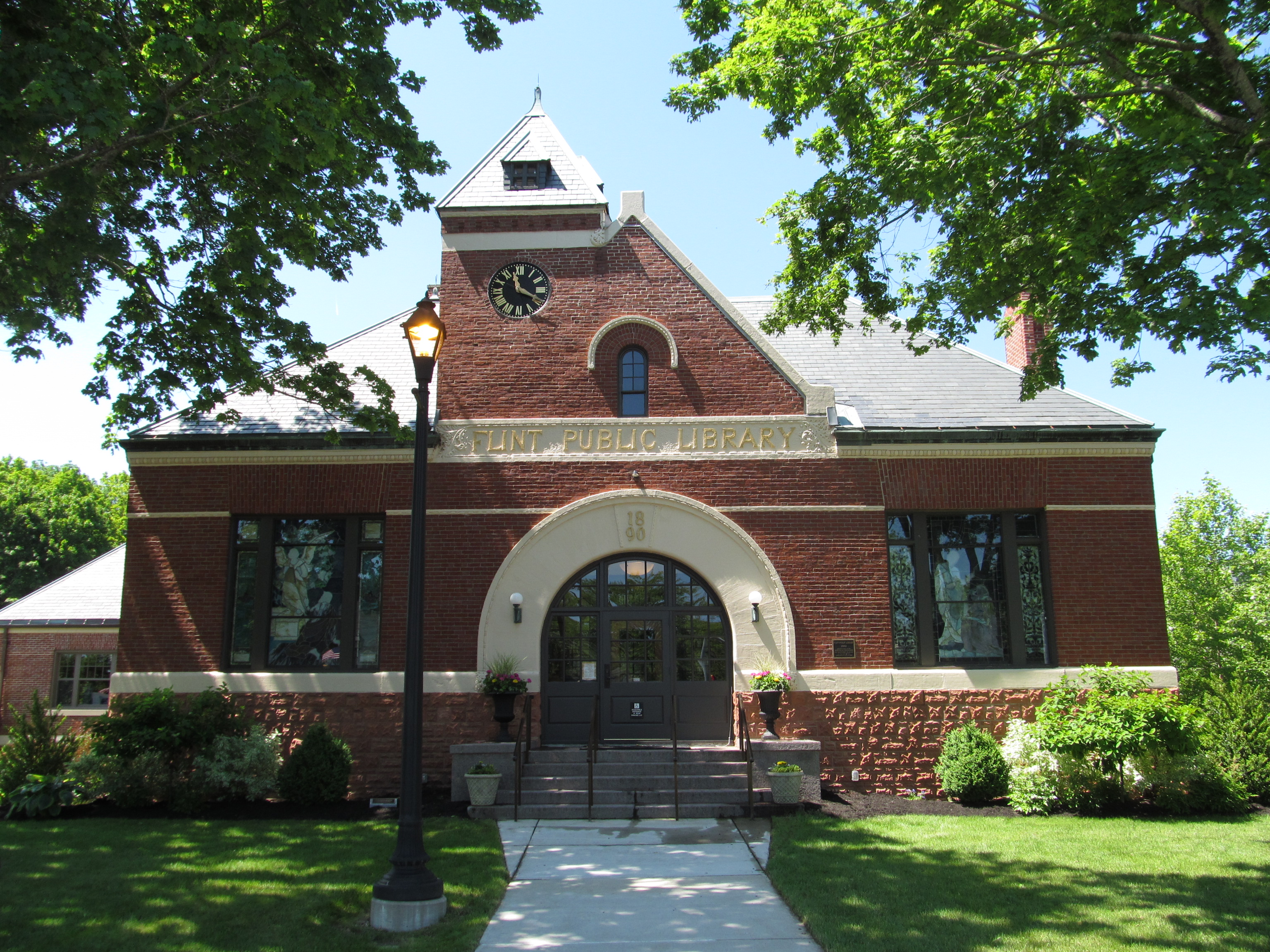
Flint Public Library, Middleton, Massachusetts, 1890-91.

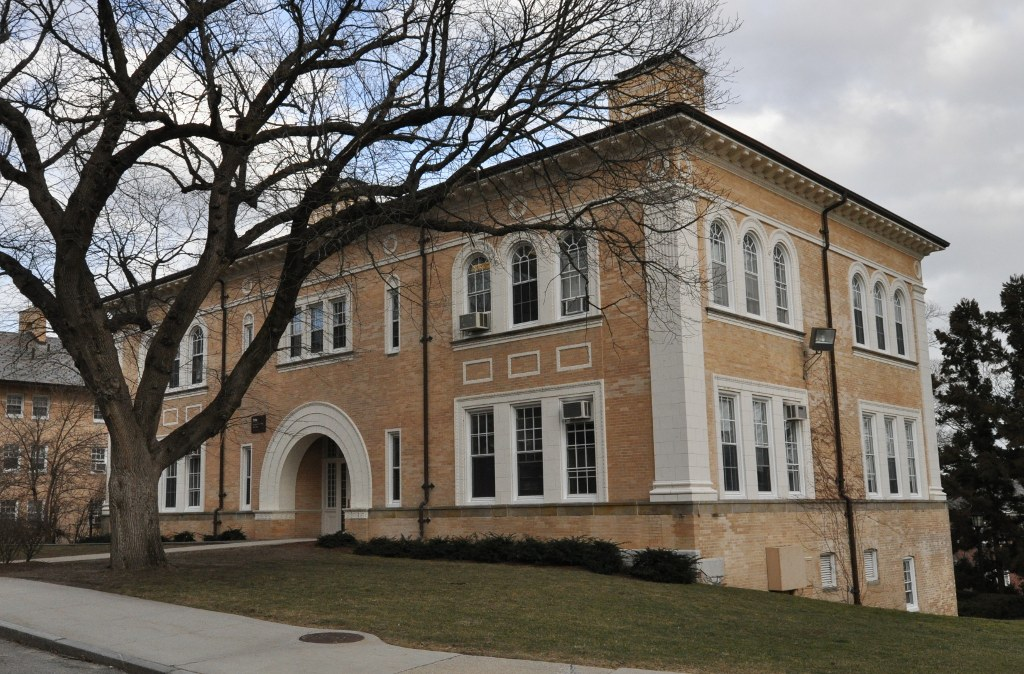
Miner Hall, Tufts University, Medford, Massachusetts, 1891-92.

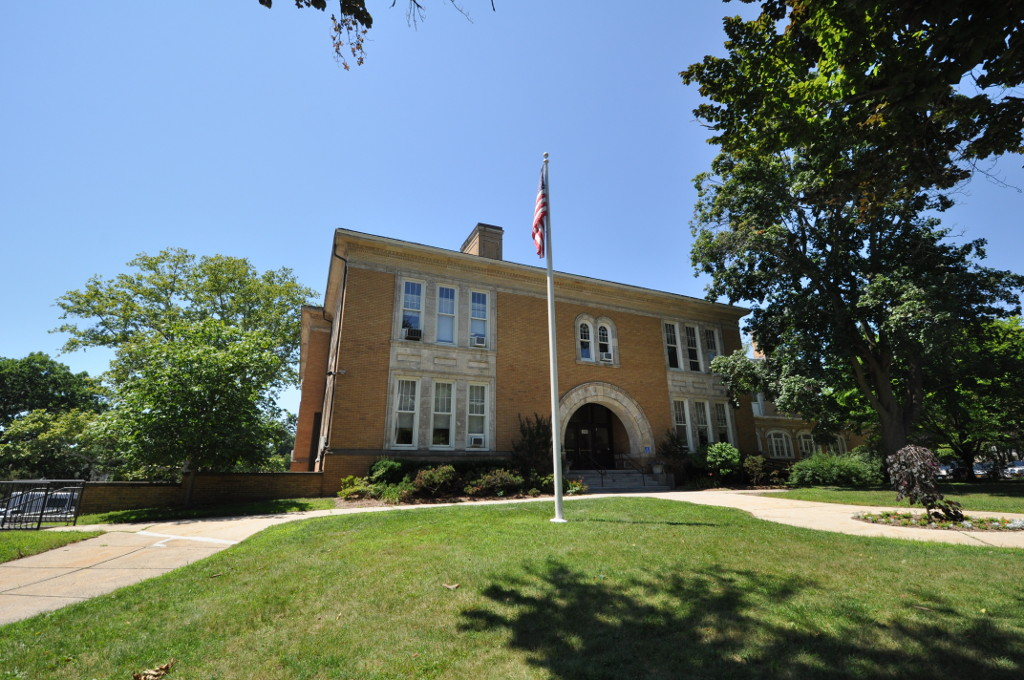
Havemeyer School, Greenwich, Connecticut, 1892.

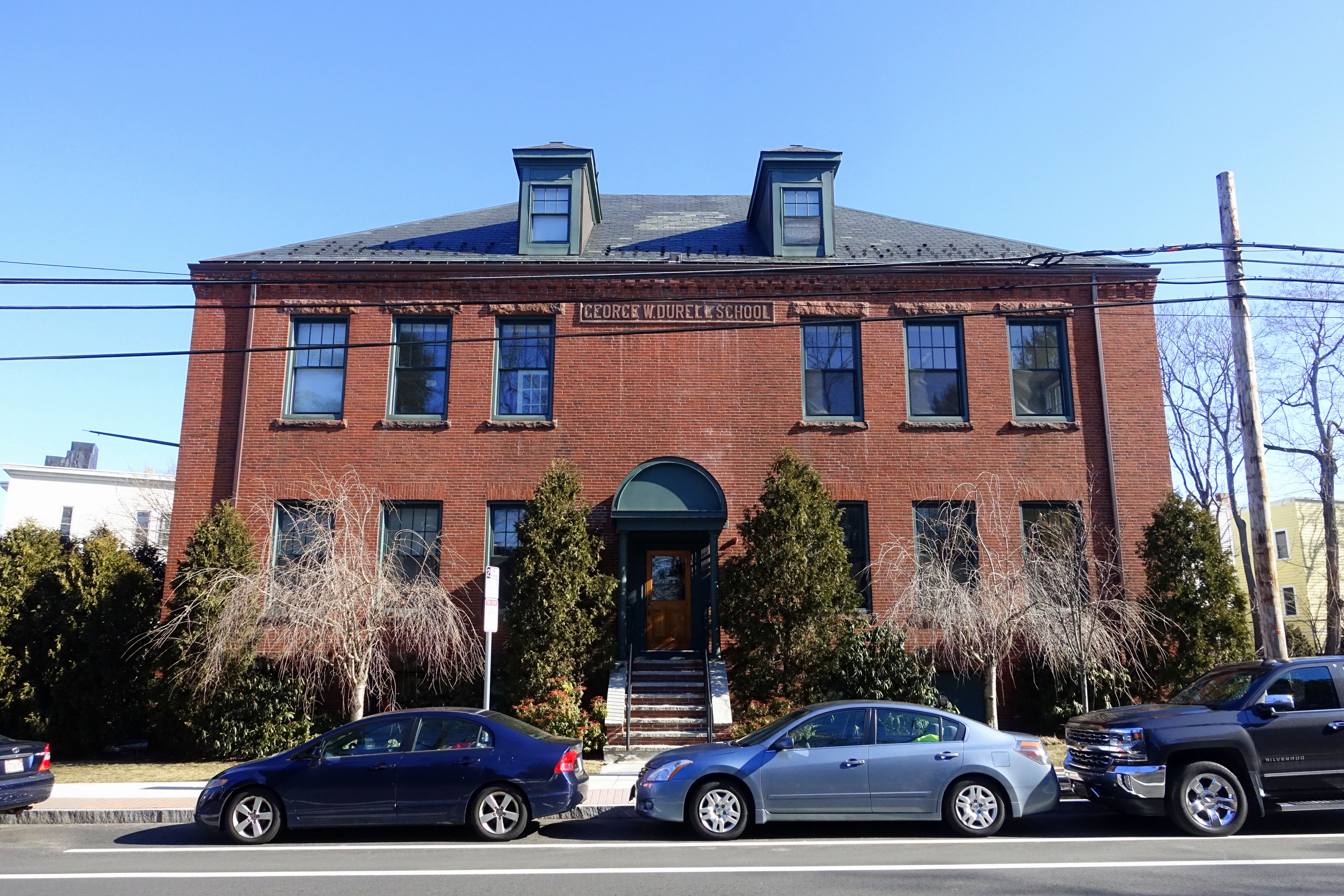
George W. Durell School, Somerville, Massachusetts, 1894.

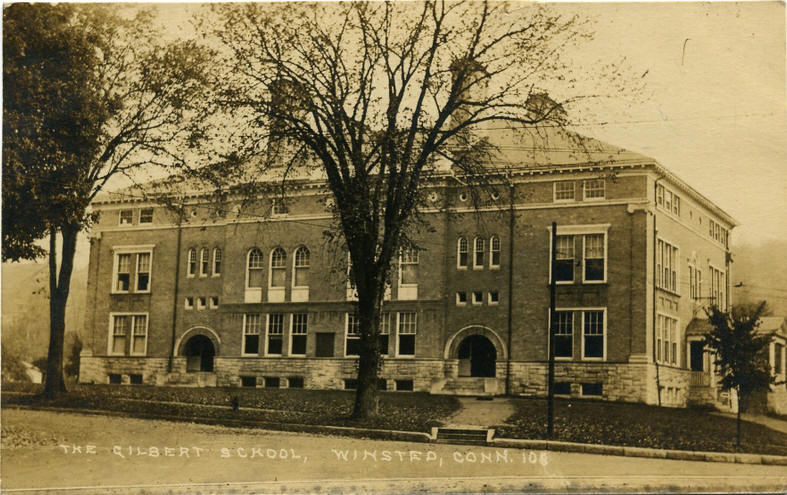
Gilbert School, Winsted, Connecticut, 1895.

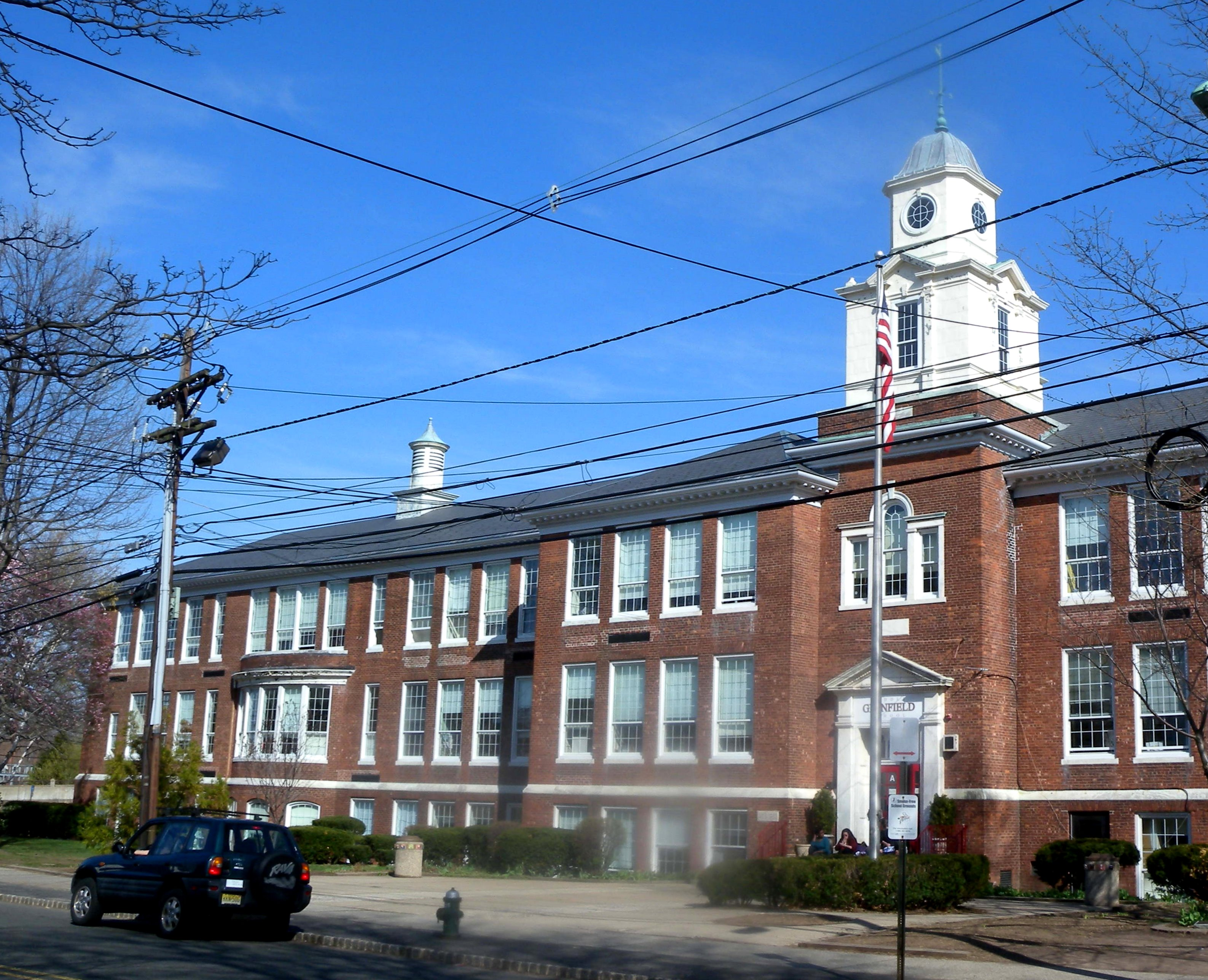
Glenfield School, Montclair, New Jersey, 1895-96.

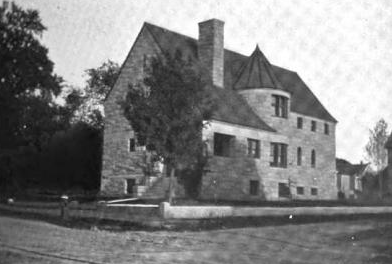
Hopkinton Public Library, Hopkinton, Massachusetts, 1895.

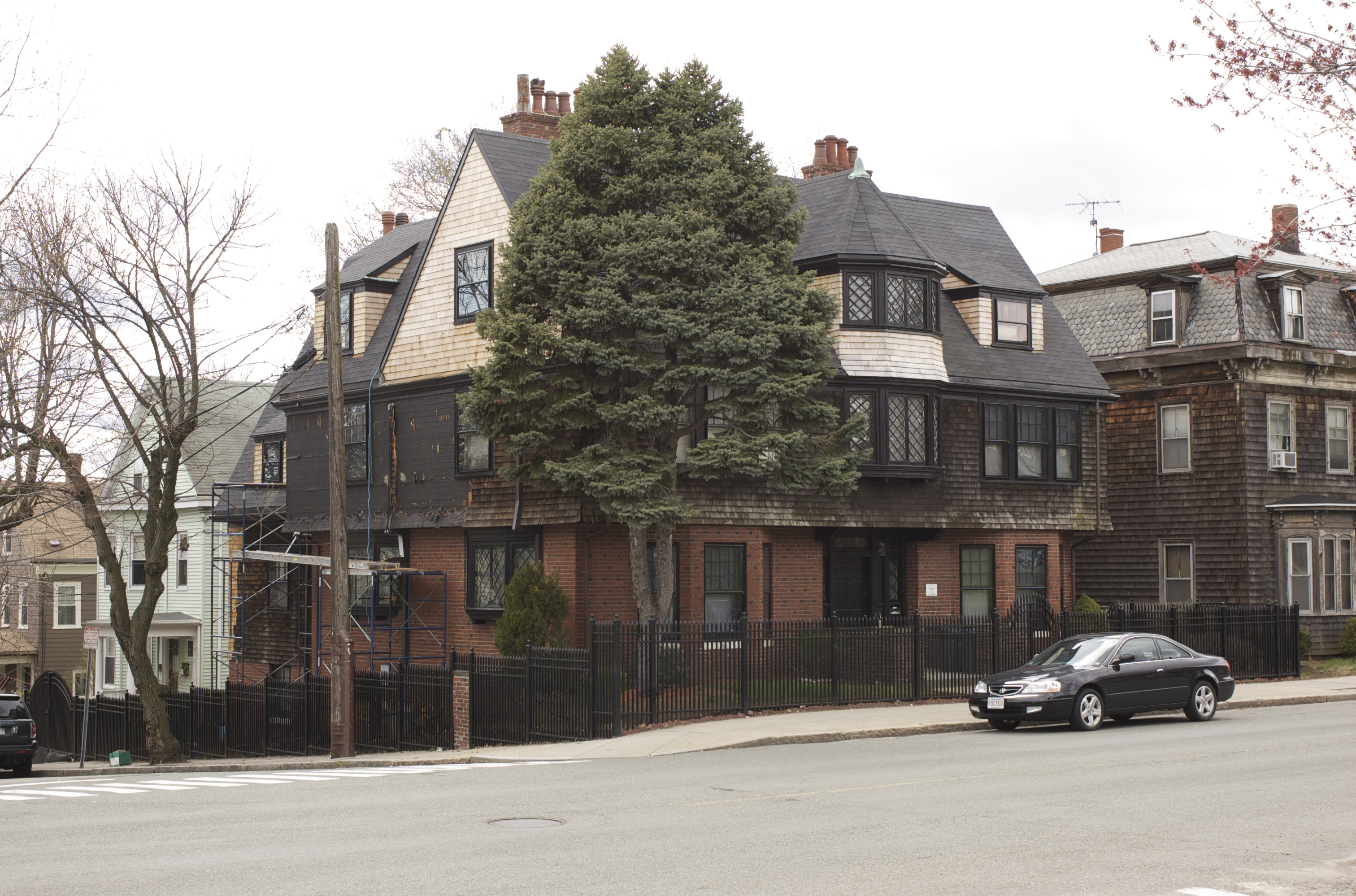
House for George F. Loring, Somerville, Massachusetts, 1895.

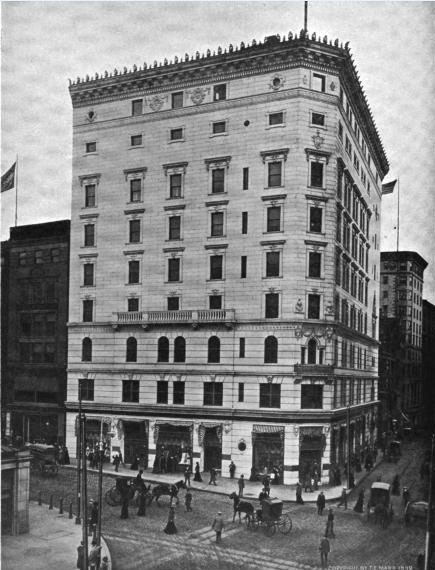
Masonic Temple, Boston, Massachusetts, 1897-99.

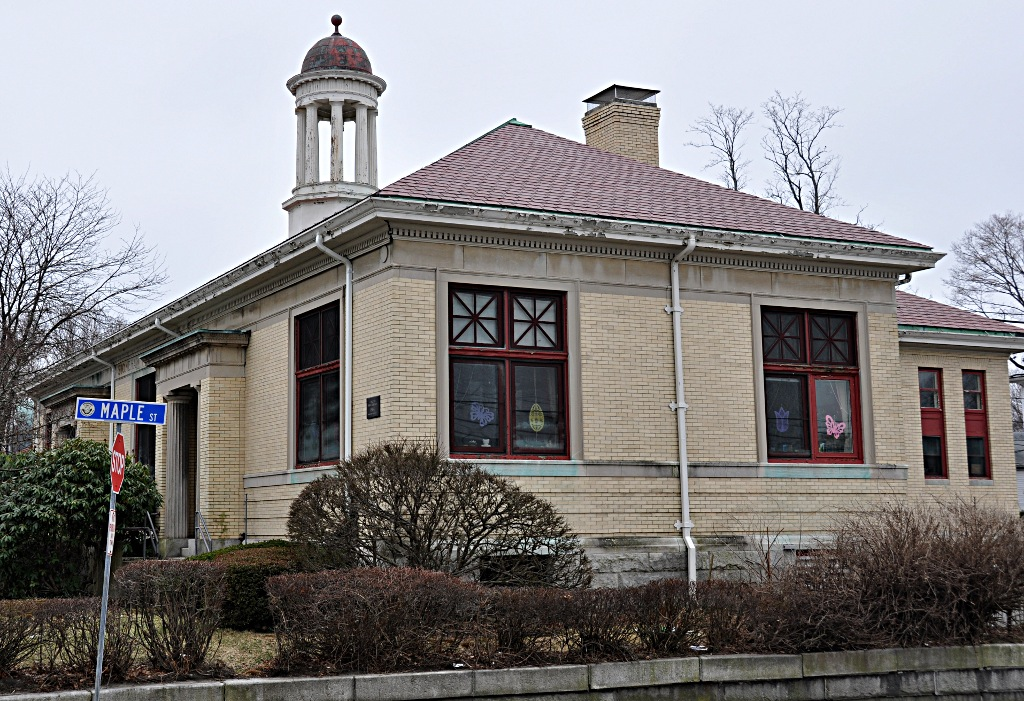
Stoneham Public Library, Stoneham, Massachusetts, 1904.

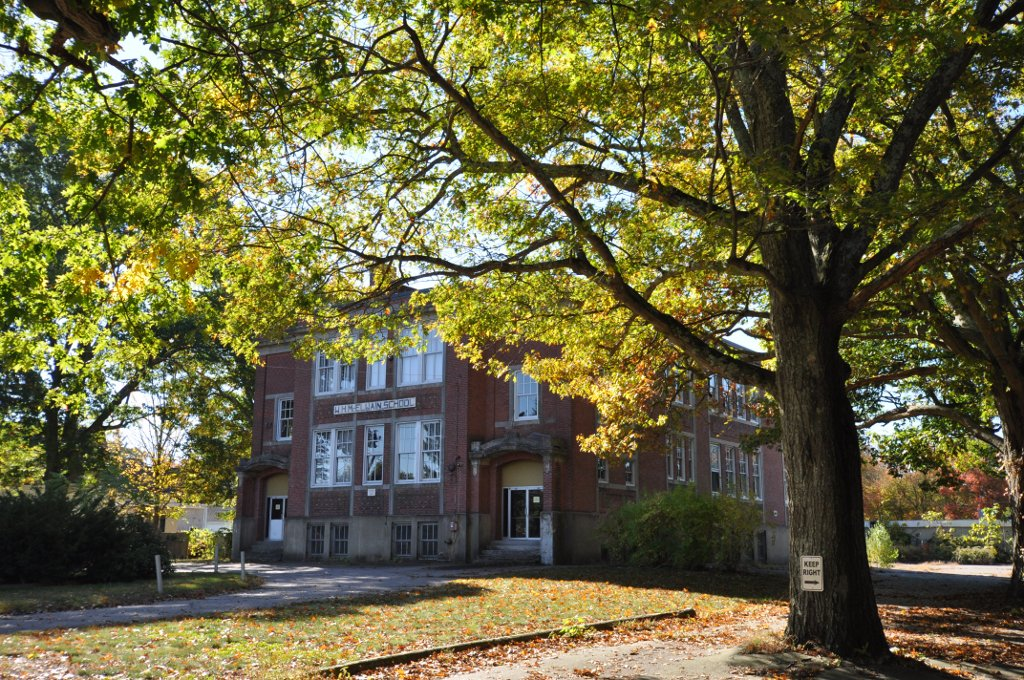
William H. McElwain School, Bridgewater, Massachusetts, 1912.
