= Deacon Edward Putnam Jr. House =

Historic house in Massachusetts, United States

- U.S. National Register of Historic Places
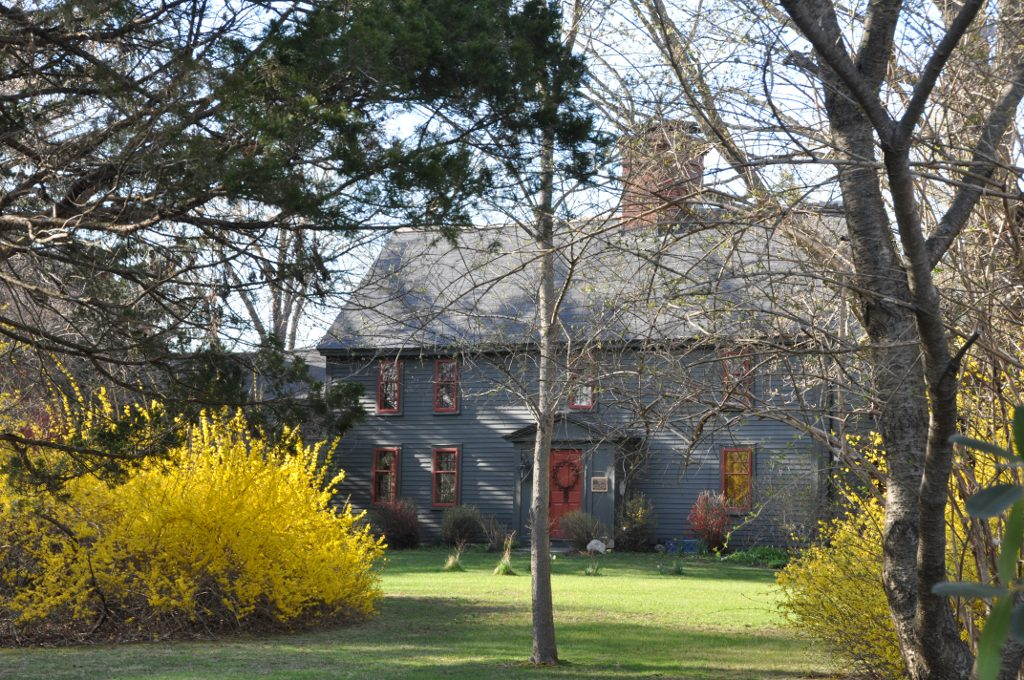

- Location within Massachusetts Location within the United States
- Location: 9 Gregory Street, Middleton, Massachusetts
- Coordinates: 42°35′40″N 70°59′34″W
- Built: 1705
- Architectural style: Colonial
- MPS: First Period Buildings of Eastern Massachusetts TR
- NRHP reference No.: 90000243
- Added to NRHP: March 9, 1990

The Deacon Edward Putnam Jr. House is a historic First Period house in Middleton, Massachusetts, United States. The oldest portion of the house, its right (east) side and the central chimney, were built c. 1705, probably by Deacon Edward Putnam Sr. By 1718, Edward Jr. occupied the house with his family, by which time it had been expanded with rooms to the west. The house facade had, until renovations in the 1960s, an unusual three bay configuration, with two windows on the west side of the chimney and one to its right. The renovations in the 1960s added a lean-to section to the rear of the house, beyond which a single story ell connects the house to a series of barns.

The house was listed on the National Register of Historic Places in 1990, where it is listed at 4 Gregory Street.

== See also ==
- National Register of Historic Places listings in Essex County, Massachusetts
