= George Loring House =

Historic house in Massachusetts, United States

- U.S. National Register of Historic Places
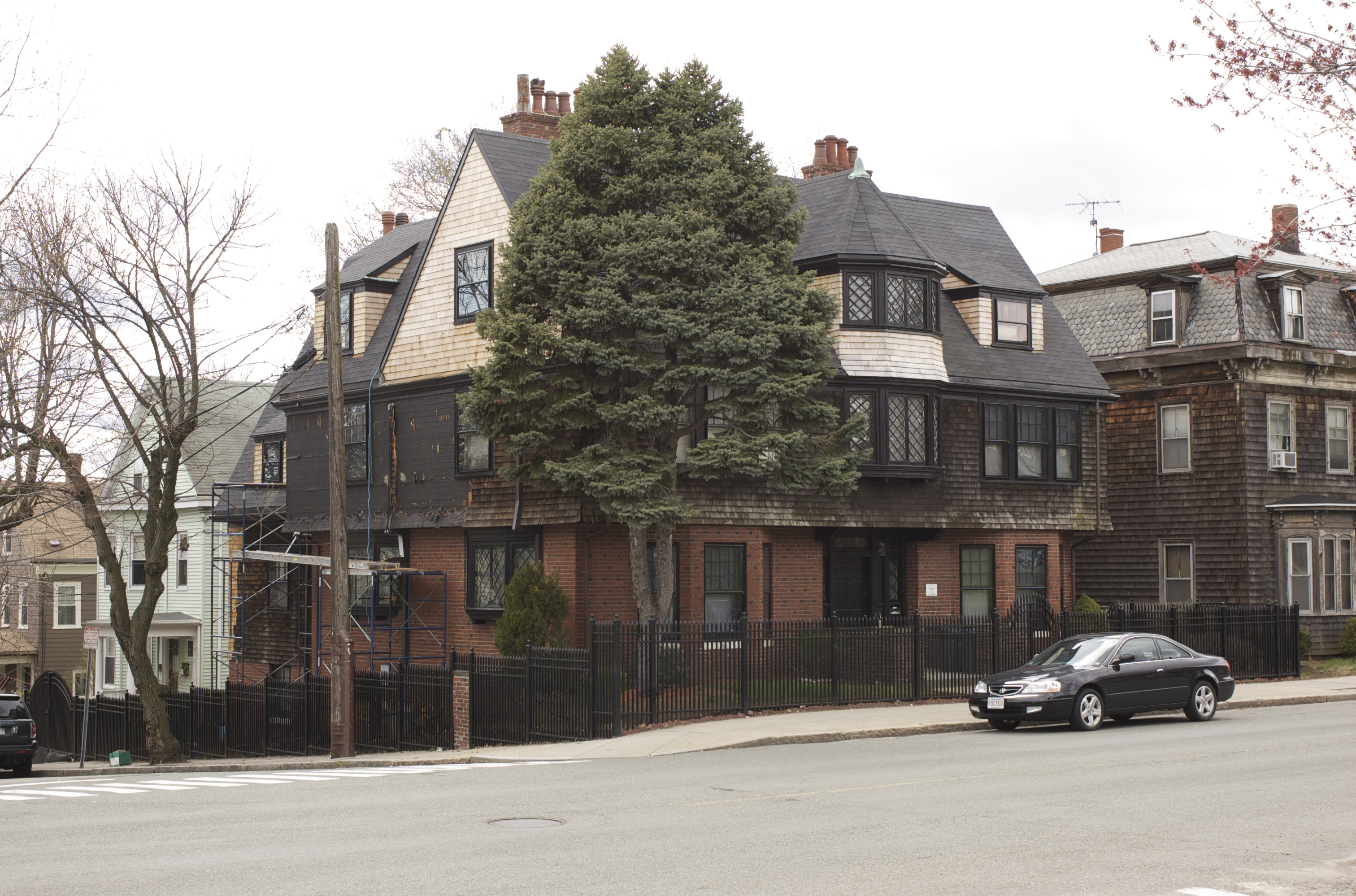

- Location within Massachusetts Location within the United States
- Location: Somerville, Massachusetts
- Coordinates: 42°23′9.96″N 71°5′49.78″W
- Built: 1895
- Architect: Loring & Phipps
- Architectural style: Queen Anne, Shingle Style
- MPS: Somerville MPS
- NRHP reference No.: 89001263
- Added to NRHP: September 18, 1989

The George Loring House is a historic house at 76 Highland Avenue in Somerville, Massachusetts. The 2 1/2-story Shingle style wood-frame house was built c. 1895 for George F. Loring, the architect who designed it. The house has roughly rectangular massing, with brick facing on the first floor and wood shingles on the upper levels. The front facade has a central projecting section that includes a window bay on the second floor and a polygonally hipped roof dormer above. The windows in this section have diamond mullions. Combined with the wood shingling, this gives the house a medieval English manor appearance.

The house was listed on the National Register of Historic Places in 1989.

== Gallery ==
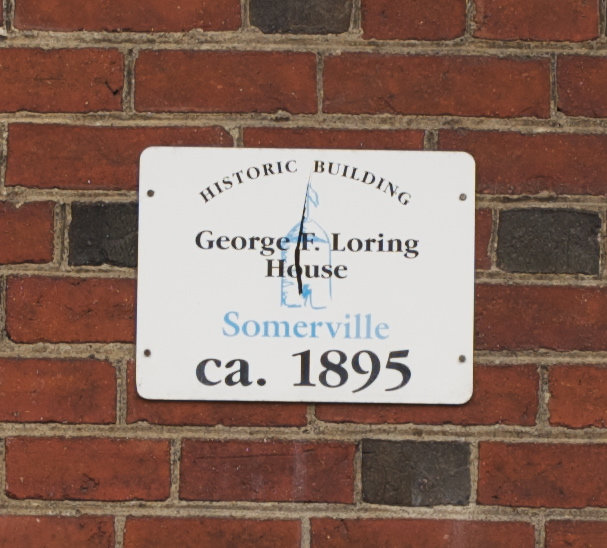
The identifying plaque on the face of the George Loring House

== See also ==
- National Register of Historic Places listings in Somerville, Massachusetts
