= Middleton, Massachusetts =

- Town
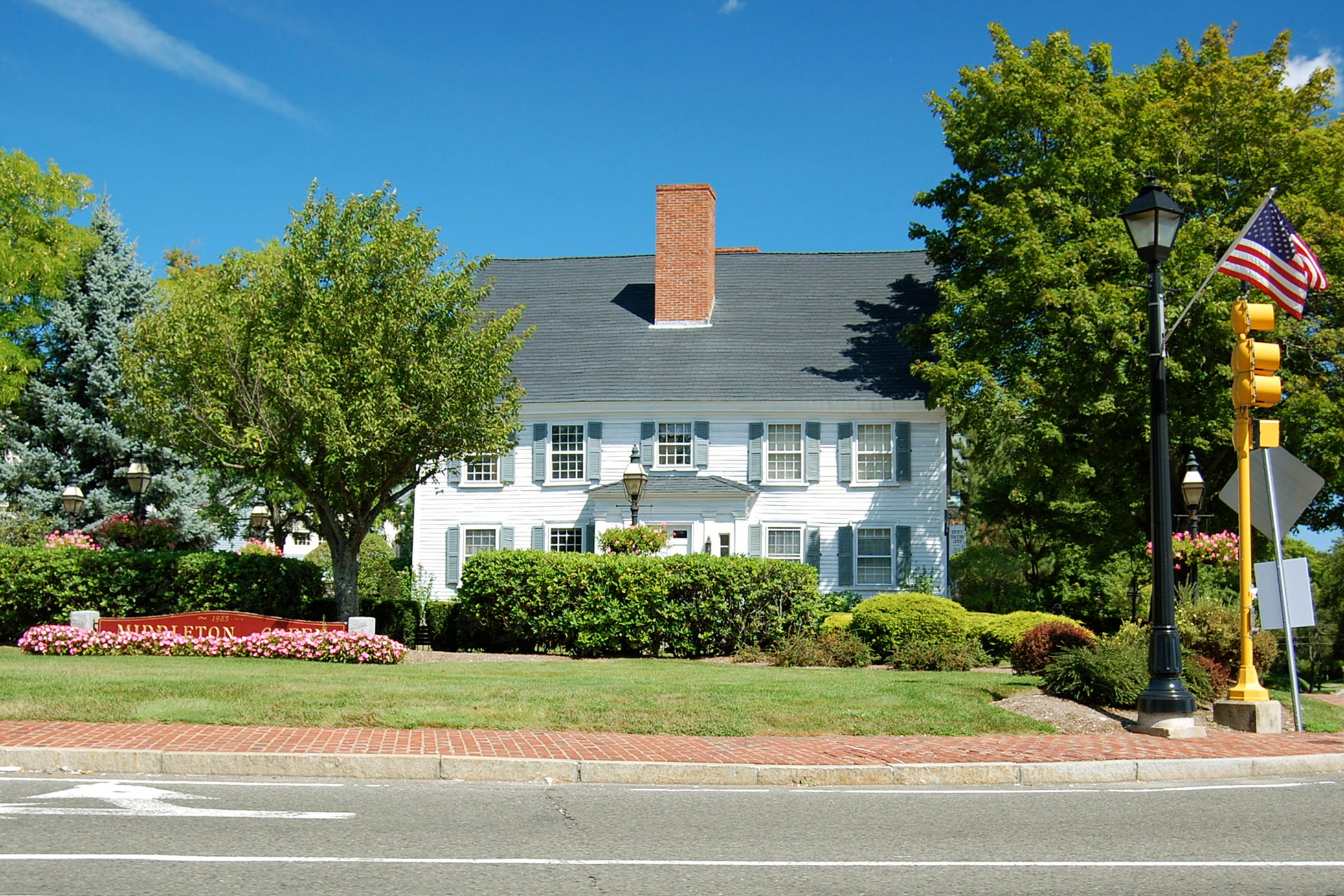
- The corner of Main and Maple Streets

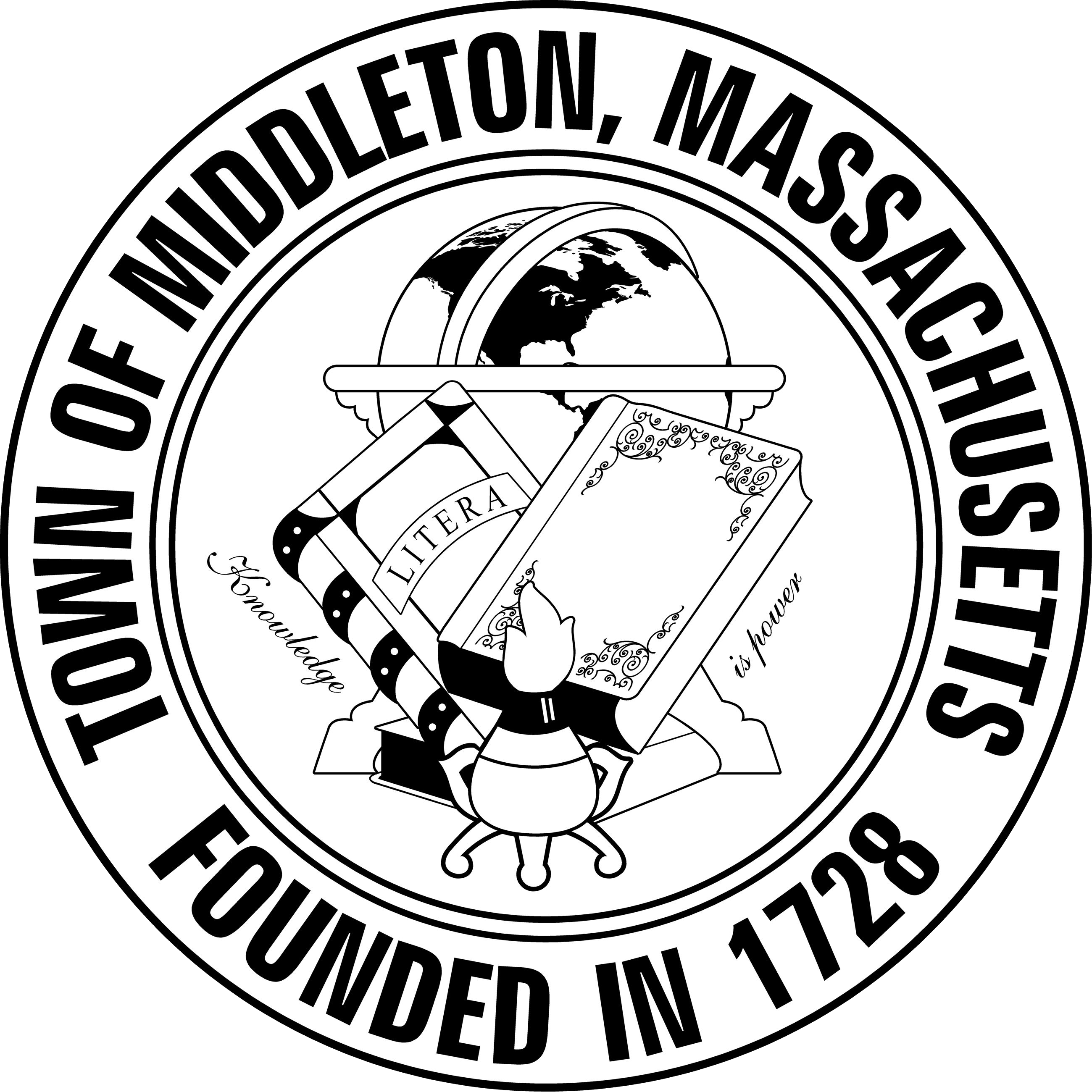
- Seal
- Motto: "Knowledge is Power"
- Location in Essex County and the state of Massachusetts.
- Coordinates: 42°35′42″N 71°01′00″W
- Country: United States
- State: Massachusetts
- County: Essex
- Settled: 1659
- Incorporated: 1728

Government
  - Type: Open town meeting

Area
  - Total: 14.4 sq mi (37.4 km^{2})
  - Land: 14.0 sq mi (36.2 km^{2})
  - Water: 0.46 sq mi (1.2 km^{2})
- Elevation: 95 ft (29 m)

Population (2020)
  - Total: 9,779
  - Density: 727/sq mi (280.8/km^{2})
- Time zone: UTC-5 (Eastern)
  - Summer (DST): UTC-4 (Eastern)
- ZIP code: 01949
- Area code: 351 / 978
- FIPS code: 25-41095
- GNIS feature ID: 0618303
- Website: http://www.middletonma.gov/

Middleton is a town in Essex County, Massachusetts, United States. The population was 9,779 at the 2020 census.

== History ==
Before European colonial settlement, the area was home to a number of native settlements. The area fell along an ill-defined "border" region between the Massachusett and Pennacook. The tribes in this region generally spoke the Abenaki language, with major local tribes being the Naumkeag and Agawam. Will's Hill in modern-day Middleton was home to a winter village founded by an Algonquin Sachem.

Middleton was first settled by Europeans in 1659, and was officially incorporated in 1728. Prior to 1728 it was considered a part of Topsfield, and contained territory previously within the city of Salem.

The name Middleton is derived from its location midway between the important early settlements of Salem and Andover. It was first settled by Bray Wilkins, who came from Salem with a large family, having purchased 600 acres from Governor Bellingham. The town grew as a farming community, mostly due to its location on the Ipswich River, with homesteads of hundreds of acres. However, during the 18th century, Middleton also contained a vital ironworks industry, located in the area of what is now Mill and Liberty Streets. This enterprise originally involved Thomas Flint, Sr. and his son, Thomas Flint Jr, of Salem, John How of Boxford, and Thomas Cave Jr. of Topsfield and was carried on for approximately seventy years. The area is home to a number of intact homes from the colonial period, such as the Thomas Fuller House, which was constructed in 1684, and the Deacon Edward Putnam, Jr. House.

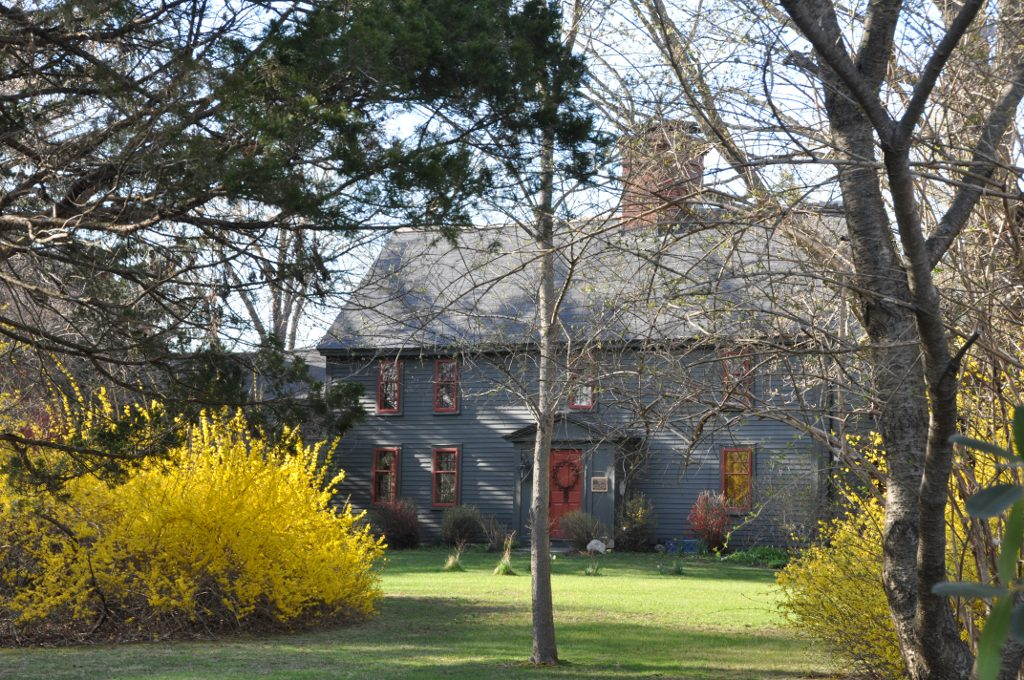
Deacon Edward Putnam, Jr. House

Although the town no longer has any functional rail systems, there have been rail lines previously running through the area. Notably, the Essex Railroad had termini in Salem and North Andover, running through Middleton from the mid-1840s through the mid-20th century, when passenger and freight demands dropped off.

In the late 18th and to the mid-19th centuries Middleton was a vacation town to those who lived in areas such as Lawrence and Lowell. It is home to one of the oldest trees in Massachusetts, being approximately 400 years old, and which is located at 39 Peabody Street. The oldest still standing house is the Wilkins house, which was built in 1693, and served as a tavern on the main road between Salem and Lawrence.

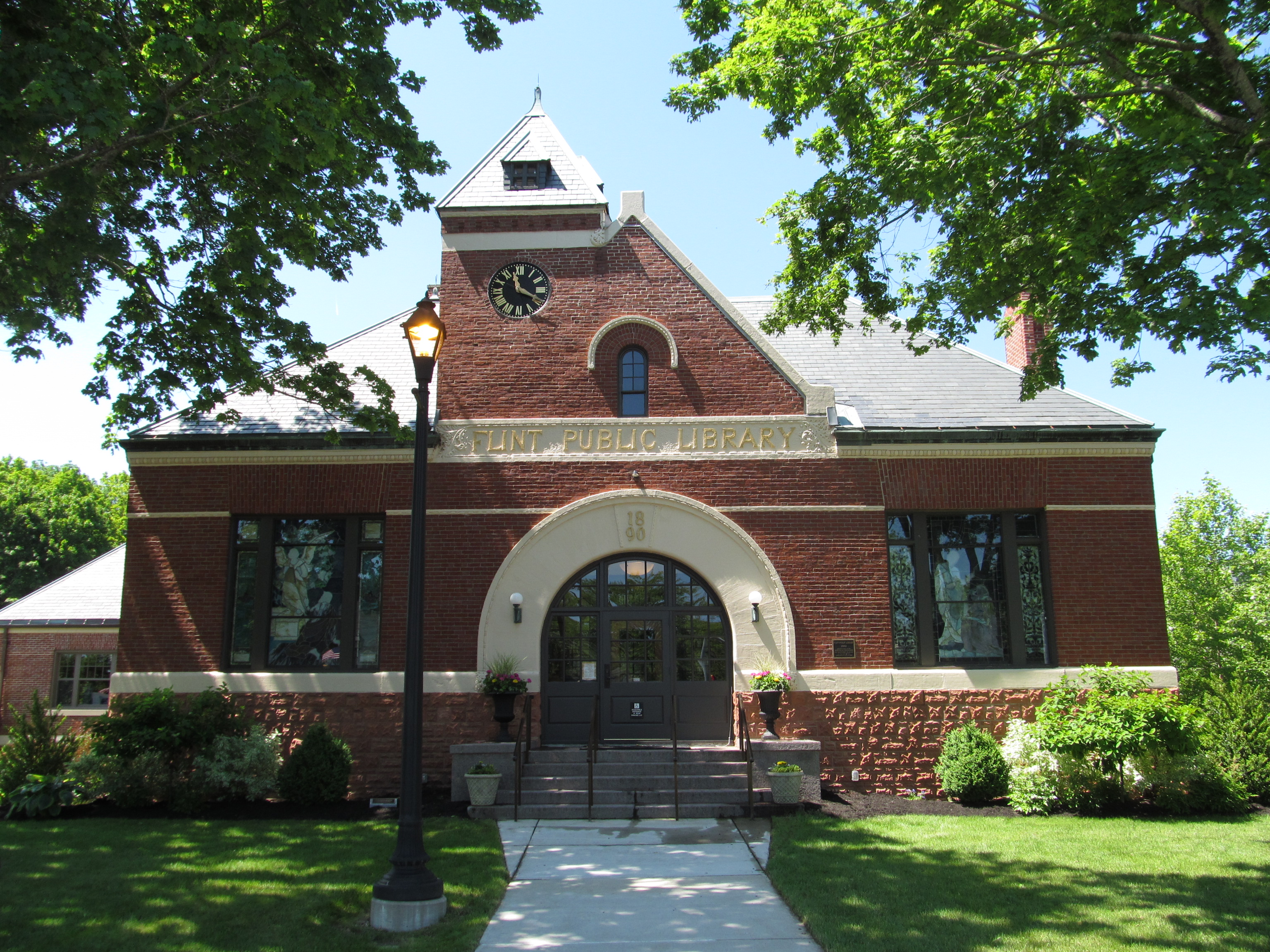
The Flint Public Library, opened in 1891 at the bequest of Charles L. Flint, the first Secretaries of the MA Board of Agriculture a former president of UMass Amherst as Mass. Agricultural College

Middleton is one of the fastest-growing towns in the Commonwealth, and the fastest on the North Shore. When locally grouped it is grouped with Salem, Danvers, and Beverly, but also occasionally Topsfield and Boxford, as these three towns are a tri-town. These three towns share Masconomet Regional High School (named after Chief Masconomet, sagamore of the Agawam tribe, which lived in Essex County at the time of English colonization) which serves grades 9–12, while its middle school serves grades 7 and 8.

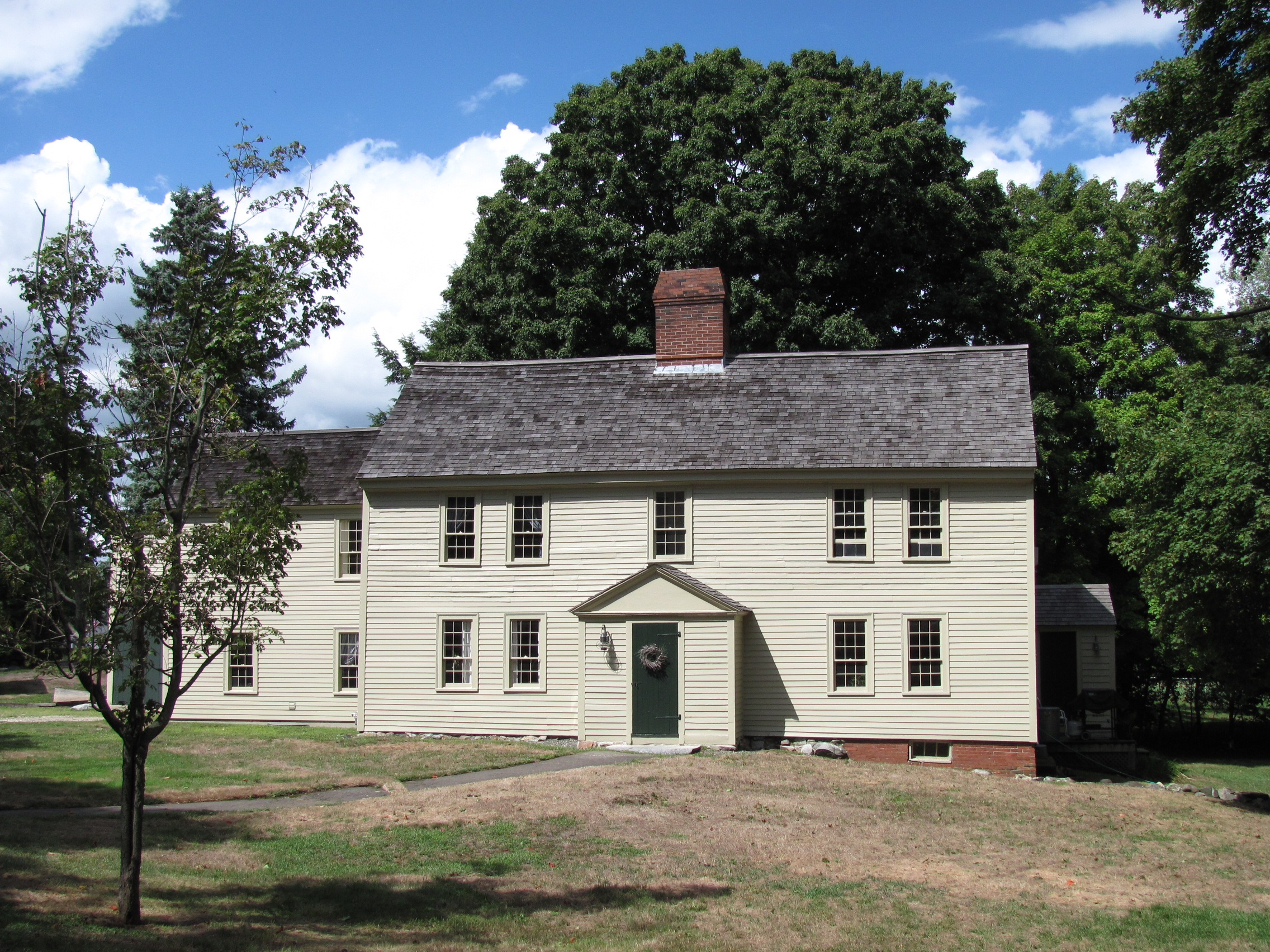
The Thomas Fuller House, was originally constructed c. 1684.

== Geography and transportation ==
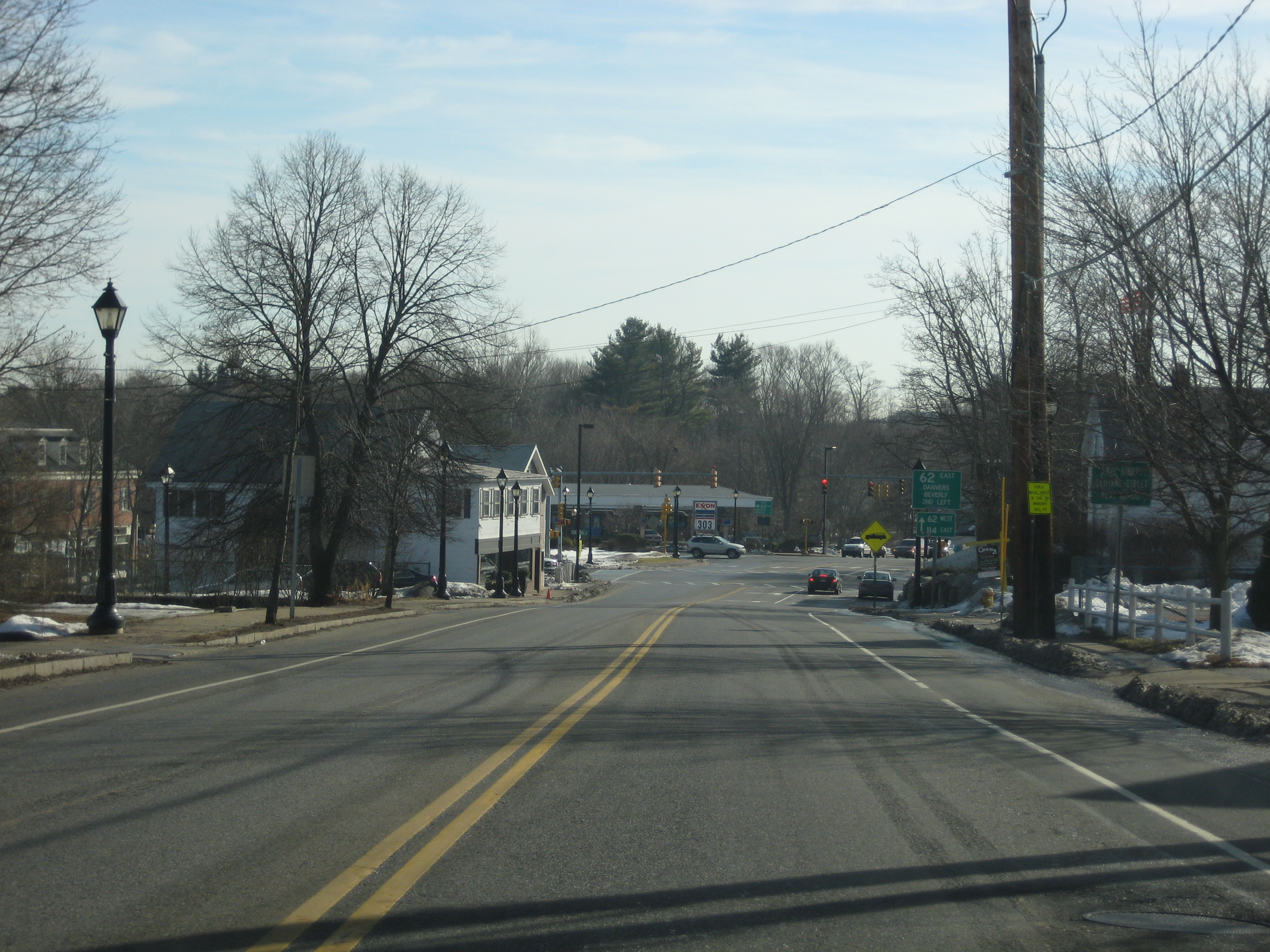
Looking south along N/S Main St (114/62) in Middleton

According to the United States Census Bureau, the town has a total area of 14.5 square miles (37.4 km^{2}), of which 14.0 square miles (36.2 km^{2}) is land and 0.5 square mile (1.2 km^{2}) (3.32%) is water. Middleton lies along the border of Essex County, and is bounded by North Reading in Middlesex County to the west, and North Andover to the northwest, Boxford to the northeast, Topsfield to the east, Danvers to the southeast, Peabody to the south, and shares a 0.3 mile border with Lynnfield to the southwest. Middleton lies eight miles northwest of Salem, 11 miles southeast of Lawrence, and 19 miles north of Boston. Middleton is part of a tri-town with two other towns which are Topsfield and Boxford.

Middleton lies in the low hills of northeastern Massachusetts. The Ipswich River flows through town, flowing from the North Reading/Lynnfield line along the Peabody and Danvers borders before turning northward into town, exiting along the border between Boxford and Topsfield. Several brooks feed into the river throughout town, and the town is also home to two larger ponds, Middleton Pond and Andover Meadow Pond, as well as several smaller ones. Within the town, there are portions of the Harold Parker State Forest and Boxford State Forest, as well as the Peabody Reservation, Sanford Reservation and Middleton Conservation Land.

Middleton lies just west of Interstate 95, with two very short parts of the highway passing through corners of the town before and after passing through Topsfield. There are exits off the highway in Boxford and in Danvers, which both provide access to the town. Route 114, which follows the path of the old "Essex Turnpike", passes through the center of town, and is crossed there by Route 62, which merges with Route 114 for a 0.2 mile stretch there. There is no rail service within town; there are two lines (the Haverhill/Reading Line and the Newburyport/Rockport Line) of the MBTA Commuter Rail to the west and south of town, both of which provide access to Boston's North Station. The nearest small air service is located at Beverly Municipal Airport, with the nearest national and international air service being located at Logan International Airport. Despite the abandonment of the Essex Railroad line, the Middleton Rail Trail Alliance began a project in 2018 to convert the former train lines into walking and biking trails. The trail aims to link with rail trails in neighboring towns, such as the Danvers Rail Trail. Such links could serve to bring the town into the Border to Boston trail system, connecting New Hampshire to Boston via bike trails.

== Climate ==
Climate data for Middleton, Massachusetts (1991–2020 normals, extremes 1935-present)
Month	Jan	Feb	Mar	Apr	May	Jun	Jul	Aug	Sep	Oct	Nov	Dec	Year
Record high °F (°C)	69 (21)	78 (26)	86 (30)	93 (34)	97 (36)	105 (41)	101 (38)	102 (39)	96 (36)	88 (31)	80 (27)	74 (23)	105 (41)
Mean maximum °F (°C)	55 (13)	55 (13)	65 (18)	76 (24)	85 (29)	90 (32)	92 (33)	90 (32)	86 (30)	78 (26)	69 (21)	58 (14)	93 (34)
Mean daily maximum °F (°C)	35.0 (1.7)	37.8 (3.2)	44.2 (6.8)	56.0 (13.3)	66.7 (19.3)	75.3 (24.1)	80.7 (27.1)	79.5 (26.4)	72.8 (22.7)	61.7 (16.5)	50.2 (10.1)	40.2 (4.6)	58.3 (14.7)
Daily mean °F (°C)	25.6 (−3.6)	27.6 (−2.4)	34.4 (1.3)	45.5 (7.5)	56.0 (13.3)	64.9 (18.3)	70.6 (21.4)	69.2 (20.7)	62.3 (16.8)	51.1 (10.6)	40.8 (4.9)	31.4 (−0.3)	48.3 (9.0)
Mean daily minimum °F (°C)	16.1 (−8.8)	17.4 (−8.1)	24.6 (−4.1)	35.0 (1.7)	45.3 (7.4)	54.6 (12.6)	60.5 (15.8)	59.0 (15.0)	51.8 (11.0)	40.5 (4.7)	31.4 (−0.3)	22.6 (−5.2)	38.2 (3.5)
Mean minimum °F (°C)	−3 (−19)	0 (−18)	9 (−13)	25 (−4)	34 (1)	43 (6)	51 (11)	48 (9)	37 (3)	27 (−3)	18 (−8)	4 (−16)	−6 (−21)
Record low °F (°C)	−22 (−30)	−16 (−27)	−6 (−21)	8 (−13)	27 (−3)	35 (2)	42 (6)	33 (1)	27 (−3)	15 (−9)	−3 (−19)	−16 (−27)	−22 (−30)
Average precipitation inches (mm)	3.49 (89)	3.27 (83)	4.54 (115)	4.35 (110)	3.73 (95)	4.25 (108)	3.79 (96)	3.32 (84)	3.84 (98)	4.75 (121)	4.00 (102)	4.79 (122)	48.12 (1,222)
Average snowfall inches (cm)	13.4 (34)	13.2 (34)	9.4 (24)	1.8 (4.6)	0 (0)	0 (0)	0 (0)	0 (0)	0 (0)	0 (0)	1.1 (2.8)	8.9 (23)	47.8 (121)
Average extreme snow depth inches (cm)	9 (23)	10 (25)	7 (18)	1 (2.5)	0 (0)	0 (0)	0 (0)	0 (0)	0 (0)	0 (0)	1 (2.5)	6 (15)	17 (43)
Average precipitation days (≥ 0.01 in)	10	9	10	12	12	12	11	10	9	11	11	11	126
Average snowy days (≥ 0.1 in)	5	4	3	1	0	0	0	0	0	0	1	3	16
Source: NOAA

== Demographics ==
Historical population
Year	Pop.	±%
1790	682	—
1800	598	−12.3%
1810	541	−9.5%
1820	596	+10.2%
1830	607	+1.8%
1840	657	+8.2%
1850	832	+26.6%
1860	940	+13.0%
1870	1,010	+7.4%
1880	1,000	−1.0%
1890	924	−7.6%
1900	839	−9.2%
1910	1,129	+34.6%
1920	1,195	+5.8%
1930	1,712	+43.3%
1940	2,348	+37.1%
1950	2,916	+24.2%
1960	3,718	+27.5%
1970	4,044	+8.8%
1980	4,135	+2.3%
1990	4,921	+19.0%
2000	7,744	+57.4%
2010	8,987	+16.1%
2020	9,779	+8.8%
2024*	9,959	+1.8%
* = population estimate. Source: United States census records and Population Estimates Program data.

As of the census of 2020, there were 9,775 people and 3,316 households residing in the town. The racial makeup of the town was 84.6% White, 6.7% from two or more races, 5.3% Asian, 2.3% African American, and 0.2% Native American. Hispanic or Latino of any race were 6.7% of the population. The proportion of residents holding a high school diploma was 91.3%, with 41.6% of residents holding a bachelor's degree or above.

The median income for a household in the town was $171,458 in 2023. About 2.1% of families and 3.7% of the population were below the poverty line, including 2.4% of those under age 18 and 11.2% of those age 65 or over. The median value of an owner-occupied housing unit in Middleton was $713,000 in 2023. In 2020, the population density was 727.2 people per square mile.

== Government ==
Middleton presidential election results
Year	Democratic	Republican	Third parties	Total Votes	Margin
2024	43.76% 2,558	52.74% 3,083	3.51% 205	5,846	8.98%
2020	46.81% 2,764	50.23% 2,966	2.99% 175	5,905	3.42%
2016	41.43% 2,159	51.10% 2,663	7.47% 389	5,211	9.67%
2012	41.26% 1,921	57.09% 2,658	1.65% 77	4,656	15.83%
2008	45.19% 1,982	51.66% 2,266	2.74% 120	4,386	6.48%
2004	47.95% 1,835	50.59% 1,936	1.46% 56	3,827	2.64%
2000	49.67% 1,677	42.42% 1,432	6.22% 210	3,376	7.26%
1996	51.11% 1,514	34.00% 1,007	14.89% 441	2,962	17.12%
1992	34.68% 987	34.50% 982	30.82% 877	2,846	0.18%
1988	38.29% 1,018	58.18% 1,547	3.54% 94	2,659	19.90%
1984	34.24% 729	64.58% 1,375	1.17% 25	2,129	30.34%
1980	30.41% 637	48.93% 1,025	20.67% 433	2,095	18.52%
1976	50.11% 949	44.40% 841	5.49% 104	1,894	5.70%
1972	45.75% 801	52.14% 913	2.11% 37	1,751	6.40%

== Notable people ==
- P. J. Axelsson, Boston Bruins forward
- Lyndon Byers, Boston Bruins right wing
- Coco Crisp, Boston Red Sox outfielder
- Charles L. Flint, lawyer, politician, and president of UMass Amherst
- Kelly Gibson, PGA Tour golfer
- Shane Hnidy, defenseman for six NHL teams, including the Bruins
- Corey Johnson, Speaker of the New York City Council
- Kyle McLaren, defenseman for the Bruins
- Brian Rolston, center who played for five NHL teams, including the Bruins
- Sergei Samsonov, forward who played for six NHL teams, including the Bruins; is presently a scout for Carolina Hurricanes
- Tim Thomas, Boston Bruins goaltender; once won Vezina Trophy
- John Tudor, Boston Red Sox, St. Louis Cardinals and Los Angeles Dodgers pitcher
- Rasheed Wallace, NBA forward for six teams, including the Boston Celtics
- Jo Jo White, NBA player, chiefly for Celtics
