= Mashpee =

Mashpee may refer to:

- Mashpee, Massachusetts, a town in Massachusetts
  - Mashpee Commons, an open-air shopping center
  - Mashpee High School, in the town of Mashpee
  - Mashpee Middle School, in the town of Mashpee
  - Mashpee Neck, Massachusetts, a census-designated place (CDP) in the town of Mashpee
  - Mashpee Pond, in the town of Mashpee
  - Mashpee River, a tidal river in Mashpee
  - Mashpee River Reservation, a park in the town of Mashpee
- Mashpee people, a historical sub-group of the Wampanoag
- Mashpee Wampanoag Tribe, a federally-recognized tribe
