= Waquoit Bay National Estuarine Research Reserve =

Protected area in Massachusetts, US

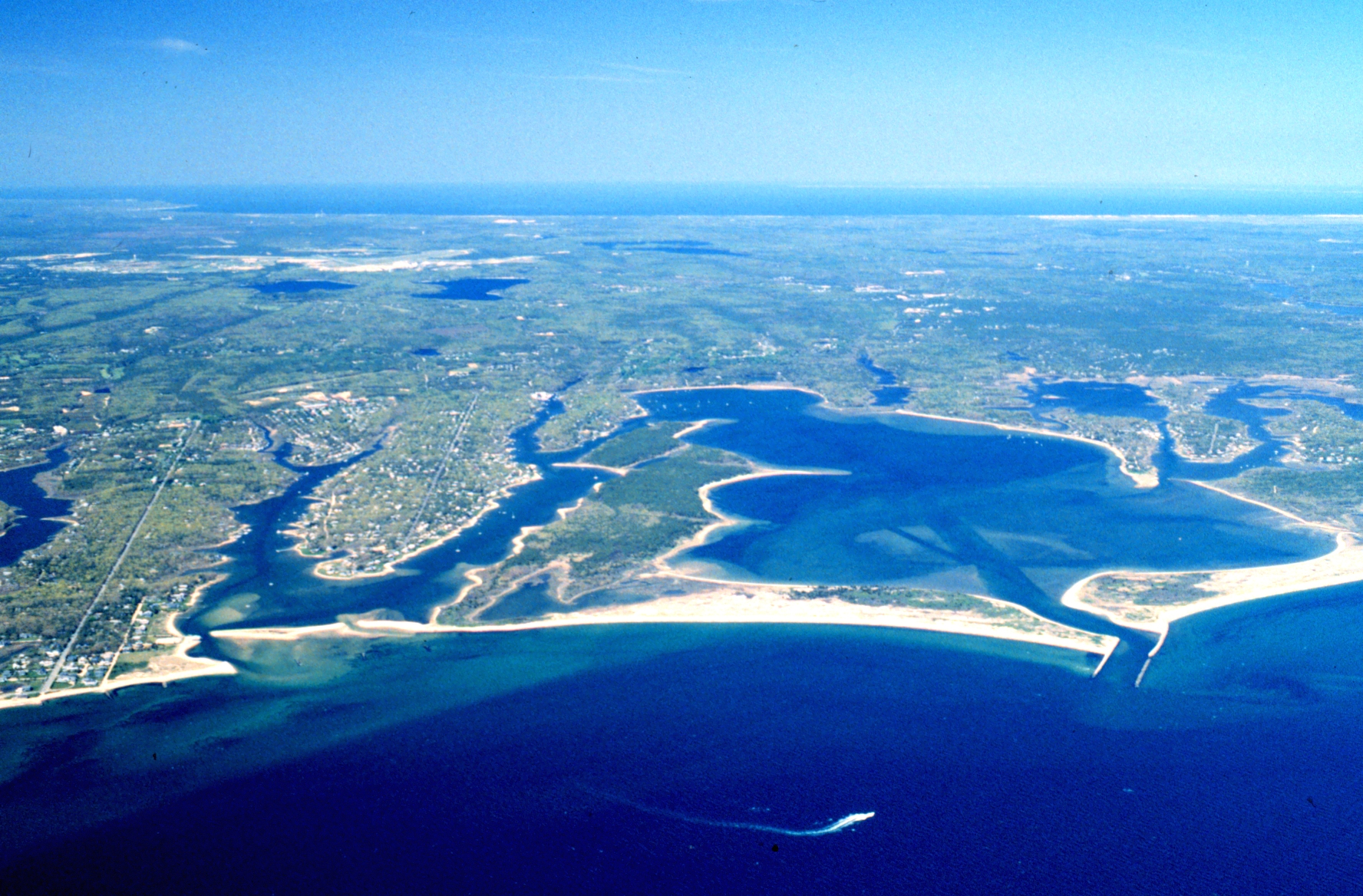
- An aerial view of the jetties extending out from the entrance of Waquoit Bay

- Location within Massachusetts Location within the United States
- Location: Falmouth and Mashpee, Massachusetts, United States
- Coordinates: 41°33′00″N 70°31′40″W
- Area: 110 acres (45 ha)
- Elevation: 0 ft (0 m)
- Established: 1988
- Administrator: Massachusetts Department of Conservation and Recreation
- Website: Official website

Waquoit Bay National Estuarine Research Reserve encompasses open waters, barrier beaches, marshlands and uplands on the south shore of Cape Cod in the towns of Falmouth and Mashpee. The park is managed by the Department of Conservation and Recreation and the National Oceanic and Atmospheric Administration.

== Reserve areas ==
The reserve comprises several individual sites:

- Visitor Center/Headquarters Property 28-acre (11 ha) The Visitor Center is open year round, Monday through Friday, 10 am – 4 pm. Has a short nature trail and runs numerous seasonal education programs.
- South Cape Beach State Park, Sage Lot Pond and Flat Pond 432 acres (175 ha) This eastern section of the reserve serves has a swimming beach which is a noted surf casting site during the annual bluefish and striped bass migrations. It is also a nesting ground for protected species such as piping plover and least tern. Sage Lot and Flat Ponds are salt ponds to the east of Waquoit Bay.
- Washburn Island
- Quashnet River Property 361 acres (146 ha) The river is the largest source of fresh water to the Bay and is mostly surrounded by upland forests. There is a three-mile (5 km) loop trail along the river. Trout Unlimited that has converted a cranberry bog channel back to a river.
- North Quashnet Woodlands 25 acres (10 ha) Pine woodlands and an abandoned cranberry bog.
- Waquoit Bay 825 acres (334 ha) Fresh water enters the Bay from four principal sources: the Quashnet/Moonakis River, Red Brook, Childs River, and ground water flow.

The following are salt ponds to the east of Waquoit Bay which are best explored by kayak:

- Hamblin Pond, 141 acres (57 ha)
- Jehu Pond, 172 acres (70 ha)
- Abigail's Brook

The following freshwater ponds drain to the Waquoit Bay at the northern side and offer kayaking and fishing:

- Bog Pond, 2.8 acres (1.1 ha)
- Bourne Pond, is just over 10 acres (4.0 ha) in surface area and consequently is considered a Great Pond under the laws of the Massachusetts. As such it is kept in trust for all citizens and is not privately owned.
- Caleb Pond, 5.7 acres (2.3 ha).
- Childs River: Abandoned cranberry bogs and pine woodlands.

== History ==
The administrative, research, and education buildings are located in the historic buildings of the Sargent Estate. Purchased in 1987 by the Commonwealth, great care was given in restoring the buildings. The Quashnet River Property was also purchased in 1987 and incorporated into the Reserve. The Reserve and the Division of Fisheries and Wildlife manage the river property.

Artifacts dating back 450–1000 years, including hammer flakes and shell middens, have been found on the Washburn Island. As late as the early 19th century, some Wampanoags still lived around Bourne and Caleb ponds, at a spring supplying fresh water to both settlers and Native Americans.

== Biogeography ==
The Waquoit Bay National Estuarine Research Reserve is representative of the northern section (Cape Cod to Sandy Hook) of the Virginian biogeographic region. The WBNERR is located within the transitional border between the Virginian and Acadian biogeographic regions.

== Activities and amenities ==
In addition to interpretive programs, the reserve offers opportunities for hiking, boating, camping, fishing, and restricted hunting.
