= Childs River =

River in Massachusetts, United States

Coordinates: 41°34′9.46″N 70°32′7.21″W

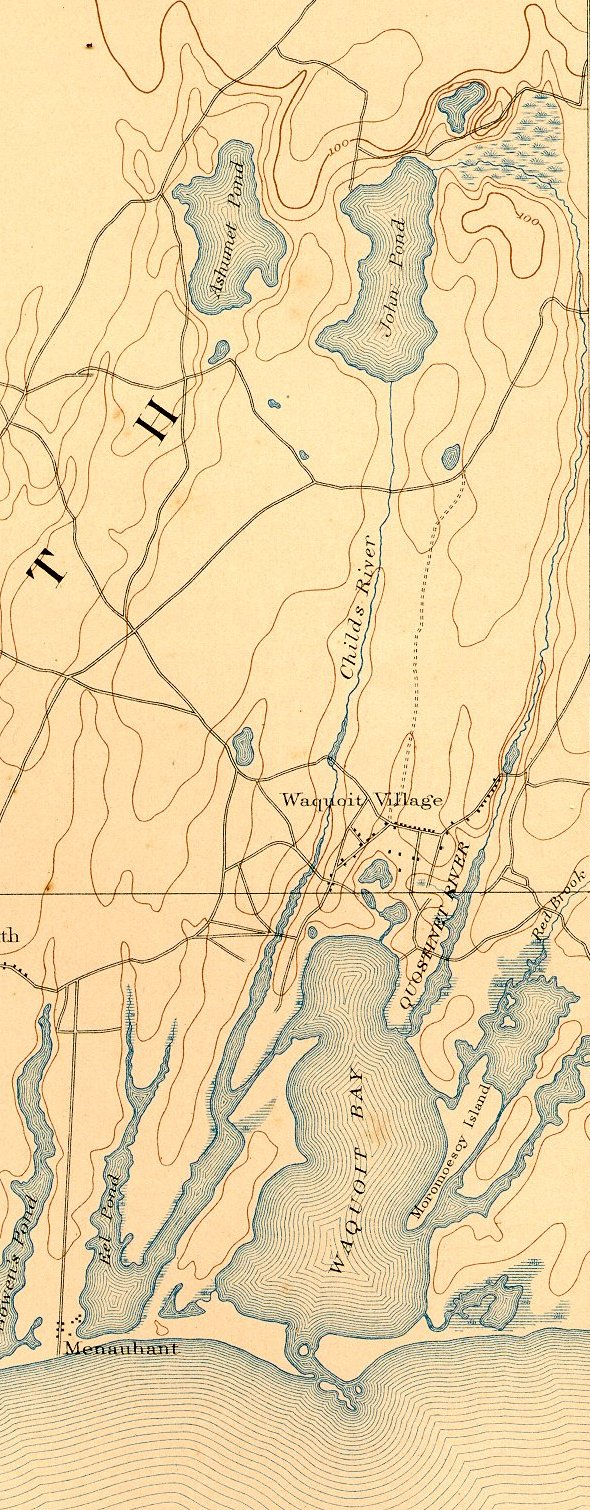
Childs River and environs

The Childs River, also known as Child's River, is a 5.1-mile-long (8.2 km) river near Falmouth, Massachusetts, on Cape Cod. Its drainage area is about 1-square-mile (2.6 km^{2}). It has been heavily impacted by the development of cranberry bogs in its upper reaches.

The river arises from John's Pond in Mashpee, just north of today's Route 28, and empties into Waquoit Bay. It runs parallel to the Quashnet River.
