= Mashpee Wampanoag Indian Museum =

Masphee Wampanoag Indian Museum
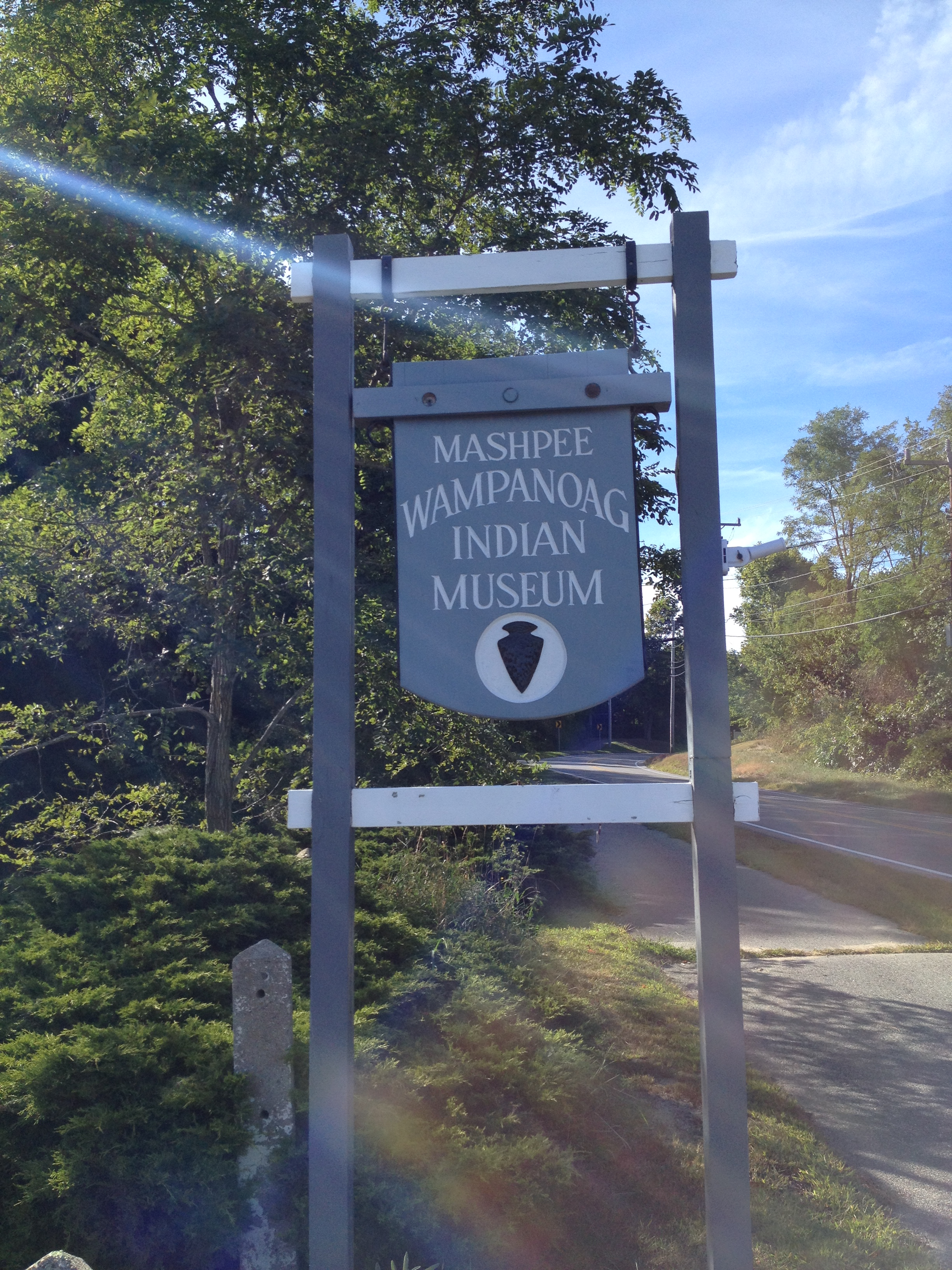

- Location of the museum in Cape Cod, Massachusetts Mashpee Wampanoag Indian Museum (Massachusetts)
- Established: 1997
- Location: 414 Main Street; Mashpee, MA 02649
- Coordinates: 41.6491667°N 70.4866667°W
- Type: Cultural center
- Chairperson: Putnam Peters
- Website: mashpeewampanoagtribe-nsn.gov/museum

Mashpee Wampanoag Indian Museum is a cultural center in the town of Mashpee in Barnstable County, Massachusetts, United States. The town of Mashpee is the location of the Mashpee Wampanoag Tribe, one of the two federally recognized representative bodies of the Wampanoag people. The museum ground itself is well known for the Avant House as well as hosting the Mill Pond Herring Ladder, a Fish ladder on the Mashpee River. Establishing the museum was a passion project of Amelia Peters Bingham. The idea for the museum first came in 1970, but the building was only transferred to the Wampanoag Tribal Council after a unanimous vote to do so during the Mashpee town government's annual meeting in 1997. Since 1999, the site has been listed under the National Register of Historic Places.
