= Mashpee Nine: A Story of Cultural Justice =

2016 non-fiction book by Paula Peters

- First edition
- Author: Paula Peters
- Published: 2016
- Publisher: SmokeSygnals
- Media type: Paperback
- ISBN: 978-0-9976289-0-6

Mashpee Nine: A Story of Cultural Justice is a 2016 non-fiction book by author, journalist, and activist Paula Peters, a member of the Mashpee Wampanoag Tribe. It is a companion book for the documentary, “Mashpee Nine: The Beat Goes On”. The book recounts details of a police raid, arrest and court trial of nine Wampanoag tribal members who were drumming on the Mashpee Pond campsite July 29, 1976 in Mashpee, Massachusetts.

== Contents ==
The story begins on the night of July 29, 1976 at 12:30 AM and describes the confusion as police officers in riot gear invade Wampanoag tents, wake the sleeping men and arrest them. Peters then directs the story to earlier in the day, describing how an impromptu Mashpee celebration and feast was being planned. Mashpee is described as a safe and peaceful sanctuary until the 1960s brought modern civilization and gentrification, forcing Native people onto their designated tribal lands.

After the feast and celebration end, a group of men surround the fire and beat the drum, a cultural, social, and spiritual center of Mashpee Wampanoags. The story clearly depicts confusion, as it is told through the voices of the Native men who were arrested that night. In the middle of the drum-beating and singing, several armed police officers arrive on the campsite with dogs, batons, and flashlights. They chased down and handcuffed nine men on the charge of breach of the peace.

The book is unique in format – alongside the retelling of the incident, Peters lays a subplot about a 15-year-old boy (known as “the Boy”) who “was filled with a sense of rage that had its roots in personal and cultural conflict he was far too young to comprehend” (Peters, 5). The reader later discovers that the boy was the one who threw the rock at the police officers, potentially inciting them to attack. Also intermingled throughout the narrative is a description of Mashpee, Massachusetts before and after urban renewal projects. Mashpee had had a low population, a lot of wildlife, and was very rural. After the 1960s and 1970s swept through, it had a very high population and a lot of commercialization. Nonnatives and Natives cohabit in the Cape Cod town, although neither culture assimilated and tensions grew as the newcomers were uneasy about the natives. While the Wampanoag people focus on building a small 17th-century style tribal village on Twelve Acres, overlooking Attaquin Park, police units are being trained with new equipment and drills to handle riots and unruly crowds.

The spontaneous powwow lasted three days, wherein an isolated incident between police officers and Wampanoag people occurred. Complaints of excessive noise from the singing and drumming were made, and officers dispersed tribal members in response. However, on the last day, when about a dozen men were singing and drumming around the fire, another noise complaint was registered and every available Mashpee officer was called to Twelve Acres. They showed up in riot gear with sticks, dogs, helmets, and shields and began to arrest the men. The campsite was destroyed, Natives were manhandled, cursed at with racial epithets, beat, cuffed and stuffed into the back of the police cruiser. The last man to be put into the back of the car had the door slammed on his leg several times, followed by all of the men being maced before the doors were shut. In total, nine men were arrested on charges of disturbing the peace, and some had charges of battery and disorderly conduct.

The next morning, two women, Dawn Blake-Lopes and Bernadine Pocknett took pictures of the destruction of the summer camp and village that had been the cause for celebration in the first place. Blake-Lopes ensured that she took two sets of these photos (one she gave to the police and one she kept for her own records). The news story published in the Cape Cod Times at the time described the situation and described the raid as a “rock-throwing melee”. Surviving police officers from this event refused to comment. The investigation to determine what happened that night and to apply justice wherever necessary was turned over to District Attorney Philip Rollins. He exonerated all police officers involved of any wrongdoing, claimed the police officers were right in using dogs, and said no violation of permit rights occurred since the officers were unaware of the permit that the people of Twelve Acres had.

A trial against the Mashpee Nine was called and Lew Gurwitz, an attorney who specialized in defending indigenous peoples, decided to take their case for no pay (instead he was given a place to sleep, food, and gas money). The Mashpee Nine considered pleading guilty on the basis that the fine or probation they received would be better than being harassed by the same cops again. Lew helped to coach the Mashpee Nine how to hold themselves in court and succeeded in discovering discrepancies in the story during depositions of several police officers involved. The trial was held on December 27, 1976, where Lew's motion to have the native people swear on a traditional medicine pipe instead of the Bible was granted (unprecedented in Massachusetts courts, and probably the entire country). When Lew asked the police to produce the photos of campsite damage, they were said to be “lost”, causing Lew to show the second set that Dawn had secretly kept. In combination with the extremely contradictory officers’ testimonies and after months of hearings, the Mashpee Nine were found not guilty.

The Mashpee Nine, filled with glee and feelings of victory did not press charges – they felt that the guilt the officers would have from their actions, along with the declaration of innocence of the nine men, was more than enough. Peters speculates about the reasoning behind the police force's raid on the Mashpee Nine that night in July, detailing how thousands of dollars were funneled into training the officers in riot control (which was unnecessary given the low amount of riots in the area). She wonders if the officers’ need for practice and proof that the training was worth the money were factors. The book closes with commentary on modern day society, rampant with controversial issues dealing with race and police brutality.

== Themes ==
Police Brutality and Race

The justification by the police officers of raiding the tribal campsite are reminiscent of police brutality cases today. Stories were inconsistent among officers and many made remarks about disrespect toward authority. As Peters implies, the ideology is consistent with discussions of how many marginalized people, specifically African Americans, are treated today.

Native Representation

This story's main purpose is sharing the truth through tedious journalism and research. It is an important publication in Native literature in that it shares a story about Natives by a Native author. The erasure of marginalized and/or minority cultures through the retelling and whitewashing of histories is often accepted as the only truth current day, and this story succeeds in providing new perspectives.

Spirituality

The book tackles issues of spirituality in addressing the Christianization of the American legal system. When Lew succeeds in allowing the Mashpee Nine to swear on a traditional medicine pipe, he takes part in an unprecedented and monumental moment. That, in itself, is a symbolic breakaway from oppression, in allowing the Natives to practice their own culture instead of abiding by the practices of Christianity.

== Sources ==
- Peters, Paula (2016). Mashpee Nine: A Story of Cultural Justice. Mashpee, Massachusetts: SmokeSygnals. ISBN 978-0997628906.
- Peters, Paula (2016). Mashpee Nine: A Story of Cultural Justice. SmokeSygnals. ISBN 978-0997628906.
- Lee, Tanya. "Mashpee Nine: A Story of Cultural Justice".
- Brennan, George (28 June 2016). "'Mashpee Nine' recounts 1976 raid and arrest of Wampanoag tribe members". Cape Cod Times.
- Peters, Paula. "Cultural Lives Matter". Dawnland Voices.
