= Avant House (Mashpee, Massachusetts) =

Historic house in Massachusetts, United States

- U.S. National Register of Historic Places
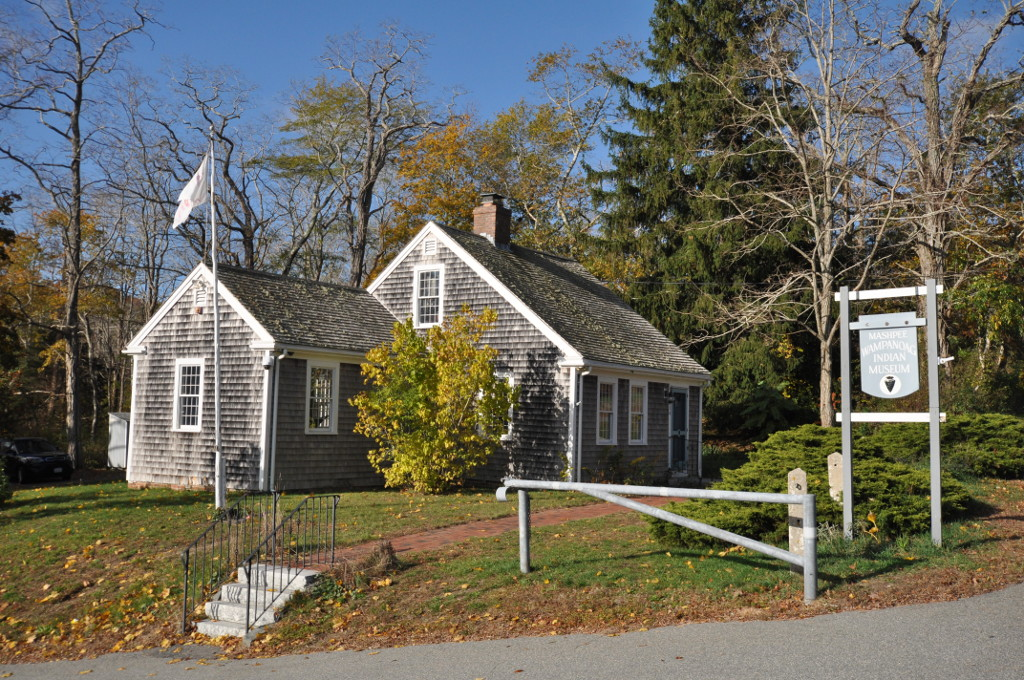

- Location within Cape Cod Location within Massachusetts Location within the United States
- Location: MA 130 at Mill Pond, Mashpee, Massachusetts
- Coordinates: 41°38′57″N 70°29′12″W
- Area: 0.58 acres (0.23 ha)
- Built: 1830
- NRHP reference No.: 98001382
- Added to NRHP: December 3, 1998

The Avant House, also known as the Timothy Pocknet Homestead, is an historic house on Massachusetts Route 130 at Mill Pond in Mashpee, Massachusetts. Built in the late 18th or early 19th century, it is one of the town's oldest surviving buildings. It is now owned and operated by the Mashpee Wampanoag tribe as the Mashpee Wampanoag Indian Museum. It was listed on the National Register of Historic Places in 1998.

== Description and history ==
The Avant House stands on the south side of MA 130, just west of the Mashpee River as it exits Mill Pond. It is a small single-story "half Cape", a three-bay wood-frame structure with a gabled roof. The main entrance is in the rightmost bay, and is like the windows framed with simple molding. A single-story ell, slightly smaller than the main block, extends to the left at a setback. The interior, despite adaptation for use as a museum, retains a number of original features, including a Greek Revival fireplace mantel in the parlor.

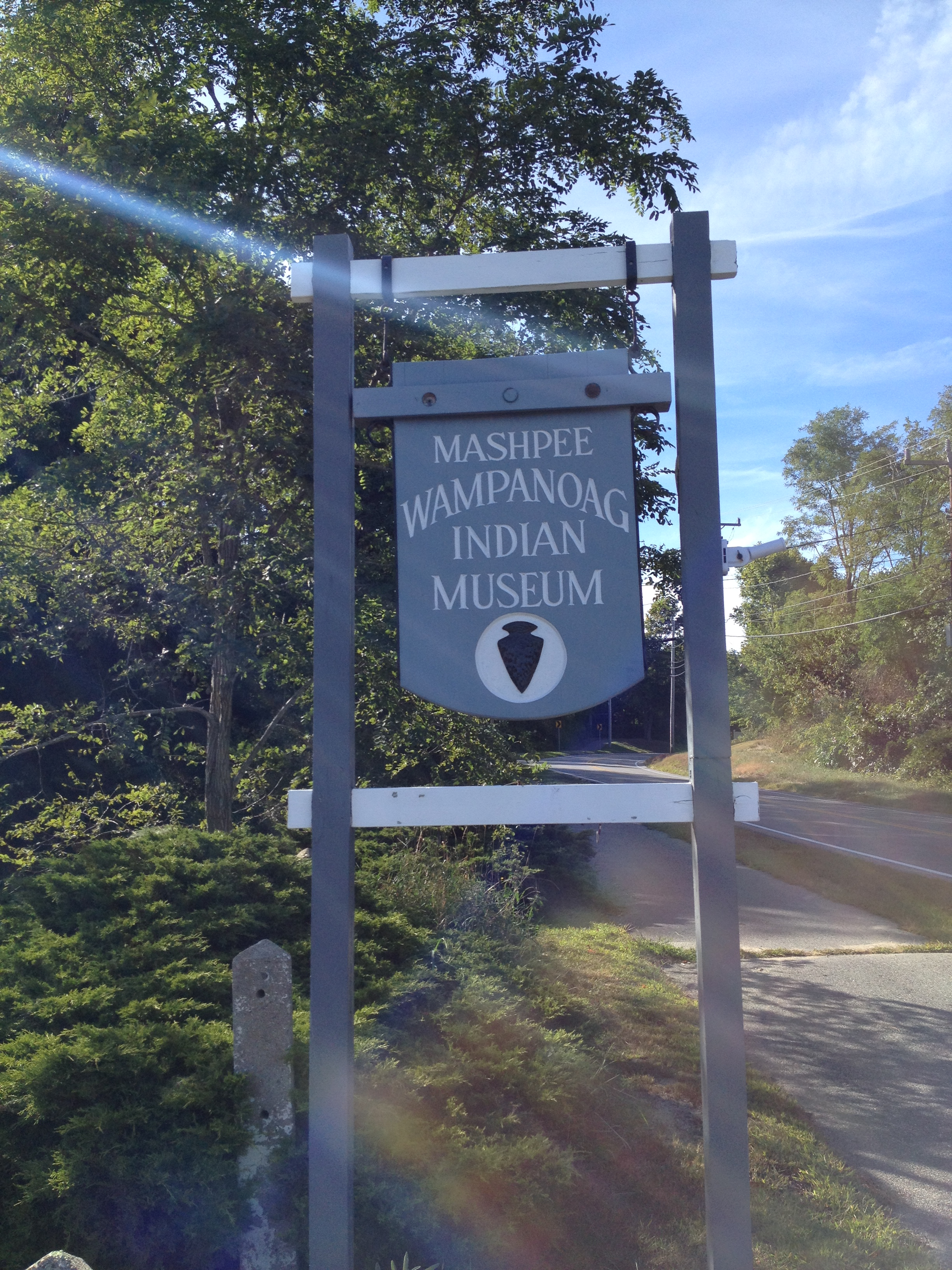

Sources give different dates for the construction of the house. Most sources claim the house was built circa 1793 by the great-grandson of Richard Bourne, a missionary who was one of Mashpee's first colonial settlers. The National Register nomination for the property claims that the house was built about 1830, state legislation governing Mashpee's status as an Indian reservation preventing much construction prior to 1819. Its builder would have been John Phinney, one of a small number of white residents of Mashpee at the time.

In 1863, the house was acquired by Timothy Pocknet, a Wampanoag. Pocknet is important in Wampanoag history of the period as one of the signatories of an 1833 petition for self-government, which resulted in the state granting the tribe a measure of autonomy. For many years the house belonged to Mabel Avant, a respected Wampanoag elder and tribal historian. During the late 1960s and early 1970s, concerned about rapid development on Cape Cod, the tribe began restoring the building, and opened it as a museum in 1973, with great pride and excitement. Its first director and driving force was Amelia Peters Bingham. However, the museum was soon shut down by the town of Mashpee amid conflict over Mashpee Tribe v. New Seabury Corp., in which the tribe attempted to regain thousands of acres land that had been illegally sold during the nineteenth century. The building was returned to the tribe in 1998. The Museum is open once again to the Mashpee community and its visitors.

== See also ==
- National Register of Historic Places listings in Barnstable County, Massachusetts
- Mashpee Wampanoag Indian Museum
