= Avant House =

Avant House may refer to:

- Avant House (Andalusia, Alabama), listed on the National Register of Historic Places
- Avant House (Mashpee, Massachusetts), listed on the National Register of Historic Places
