= Seconsett Island, Massachusetts =

- Census-designated place
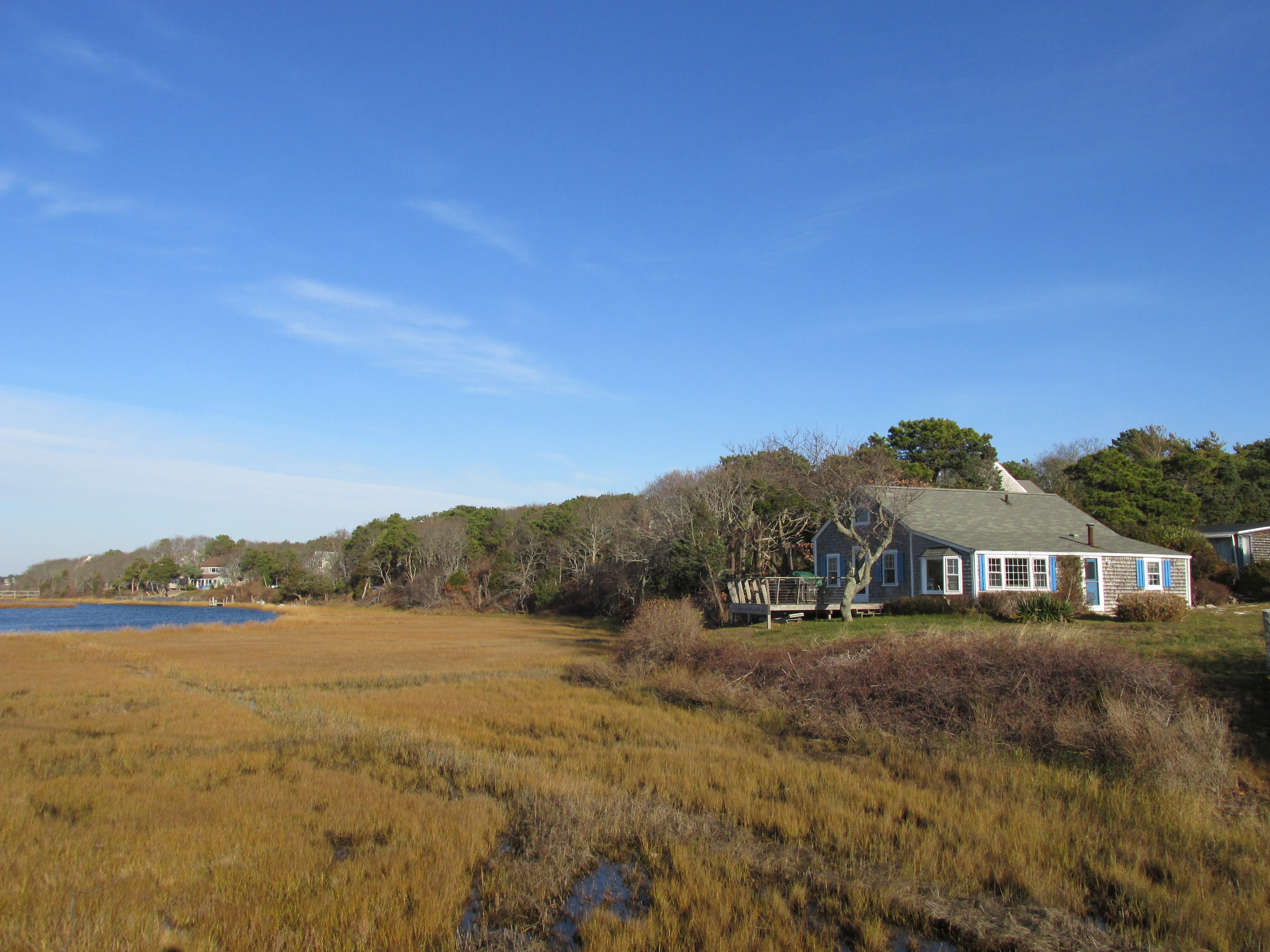
- Seconsett Island

- Location in Barnstable County and the state of Massachusetts.
- Coordinates: 41°34′0″N 70°30′43″W
- Country: United States
- State: Massachusetts
- County: Barnstable
- Town: Mashpee

Area
  - Total: 0.11 sq mi (0.28 km^{2})
  - Land: 0.10 sq mi (0.27 km^{2})
  - Water: 0.0039 sq mi (0.01 km^{2})
- Elevation: 16 ft (5 m)

Population (2020)
  - Total: 98
  - Density: 952.5/sq mi (367.76/km^{2})
- Time zone: UTC-5 (Eastern (EST))
  - Summer (DST): UTC-4 (EDT)
- ZIP Code: 02649 (Mashpee)
- FIPS code: 25-60627
- GNIS feature ID: 1877301

Seconsett Island is a census-designated place (CDP) in the town of Mashpee in Barnstable County, Massachusetts, United States. As of the 2020 census, Seconsett Island had a population of 98.

== Geography ==
Seconsett Island is located in the southwestern part of the town of Mashpee at 41°34′0″N 70°30′43″W (41.566734, -70.511950). It is bounded by the town of Falmouth to the northwest, by Hamblin Pond to the northeast, by the Little River to the southeast (with the Monomoscoy Island CDP on the opposite bank), and by Waquoit Bay to the southwest. The only road access is via Meadow Neck Road from Falmouth, which is built upon a natural land bridge with Hamblin Pond to one side and Waquoit Bay to the other; the presence of the land bridge means that Seconsett Island is technically not a true island.

According to the United States Census Bureau, the CDP has a total area of 0.11 square miles (0.28 km^{2}), of which 0.004 square miles (0.01 km^{2}), or 4.53%, is water.

== Demographics ==
Historical population
Census	Pop.	Note	%±
2020	98		—
U.S. Decennial Census

At the 2000 census there were 81 people, 43 households, and 23 families in the CDP. The population density was 284.3/km^{2} (749.7/mi^{2}). There were 141 housing units at an average density of 494.9/km^{2} (1,305.0/mi^{2}). The racial makeup of the CDP was 100.00% White. Of the 43 households 9.3% had children under the age of 18 living with them, 39.5% were married couples living together, 9.3% had a female householder with no husband present, and 46.5% were non-families. 34.9% of households were one person and 25.6% were one person aged 65 or older. The average household size was 1.88 and the average family size was 2.39.

The age distribution was 13.6% under the age of 18, 3.7% from 18 to 24, 19.8% from 25 to 44, 29.6% from 45 to 64, and 33.3% 65 or older. The median age was 50 years. For every 100 females, there were 80.0 males. For every 100 females age 18 and over, there were 94.4 males.

The median income for a household on the CDP was $17,250, and the median family income is $0. Males had a median income of $21,250 versus $16,250 for females. The per capita income for the CDP was $15,833. None of the population was below the poverty line.
