= Attaquin Beach =

Beach in Massachusetts, United States

- Beach
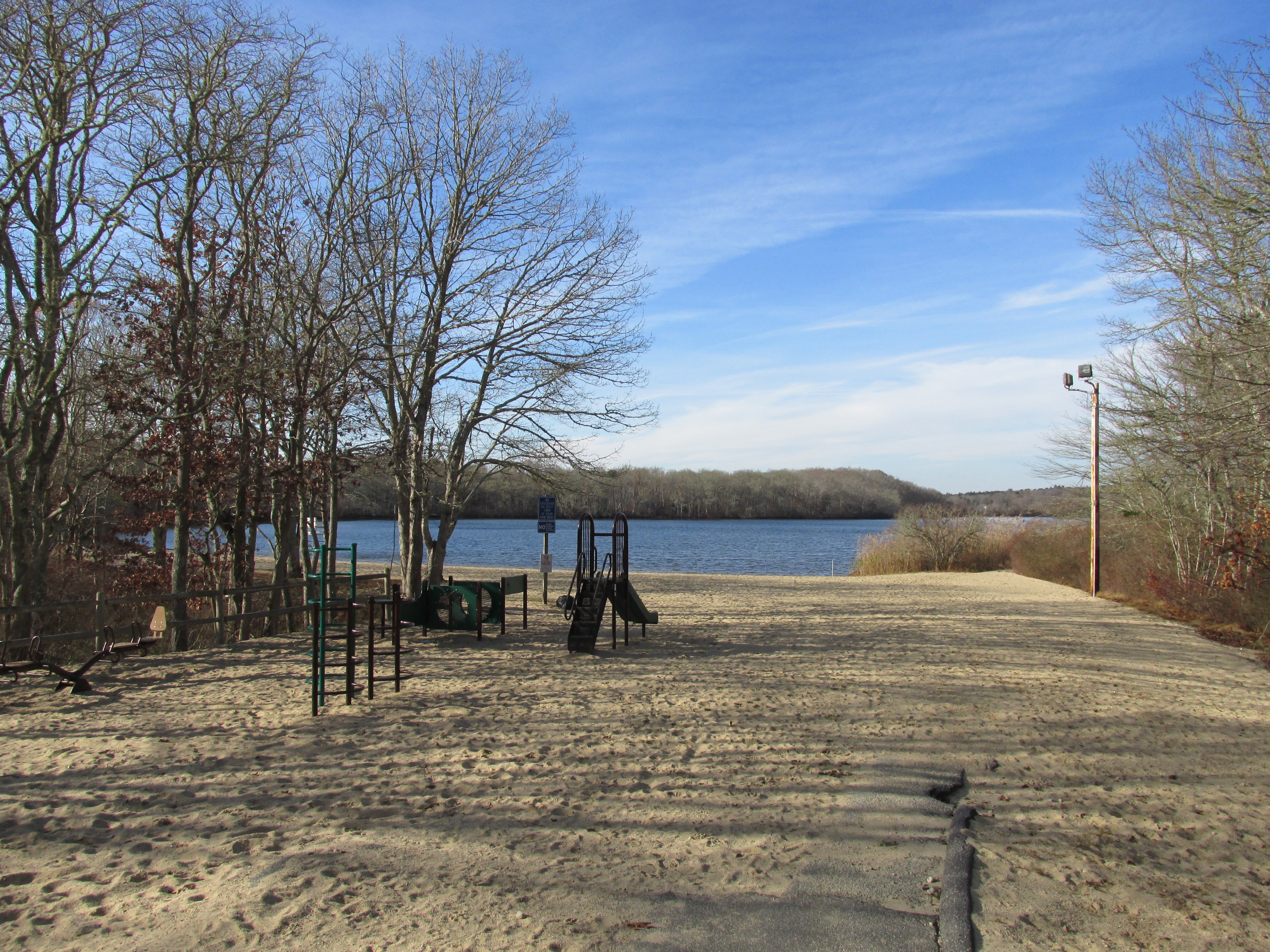

- Location within Massachusetts Location within Cape Cod
- Coordinates: 41.6680°N 70.4799°W
- Location: Mashpee, Massachusetts

Attaquin Beach is a beach at Mashpee and Wakeby Ponds in Mashpee, Massachusetts.
