= Mashpee National Wildlife Refuge =

Protected area in Massachusetts, US

- IUCN category IV (habitat/species management area)
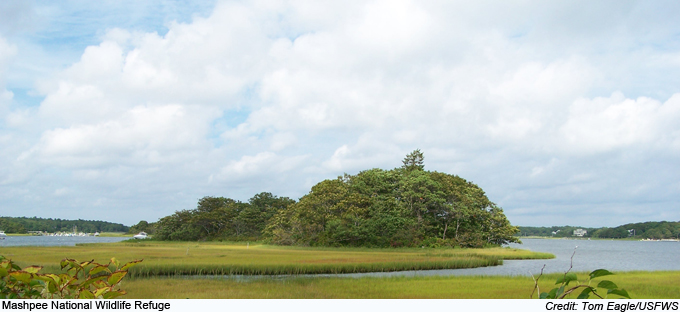

- Location within Massachusetts
- Location: Mashpee, Massachusetts, United States
- Nearest city: Mashpee, Massachusetts
- Coordinates: 41°36′41″N 70°30′33″W
- Area: 341.65 acres (1.3826 km^{2})
- Established: 1995
- Governing body: U.S. Fish and Wildlife Service
- Website: Mashpee National Wildlife Refuge

The Mashpee National Wildlife Refuge is a National Wildlife Refuge in the state of Massachusetts. Established in 1995, it is administered by the Eastern Massachusetts National Wildlife Complex. The refuge includes a surface area of 537.12 acres (2.1736 km^{2}) managed by U.S. Fish and Wildlife Service. The refuge encompasses a total of 5,971 acres (24.16 km^{2}), as established by the United States Congress.

== Wildlife and Habitat ==
Salt marshes, cranberry bogs, Atlantic white cedar swamps, freshwater marshes, and a vernal pool provide habitat for wildlife such as migratory waterfowl, songbirds, shorebirds, raptors, red fox, and white-tailed deer.

The refuge staff is studying the endangered New England Cottontail (NEC) rabbit at the refuge. Biologists and volunteers are conducting surveys of rabbits and collection of scat to determine the NEC activity. Prescribed burns of forests within the refuge are used to foster habitat creation for the NEC.

== Management ==
The refuge is managed by a unique partnership of nine federal, state and private conservation groups: and supported by the Friends of Mashpee National Wildlife Refuge

- Falmouth Rod and Gun Club
- Massachusetts Division of Fisheries and Wildlife
- Massachusetts Executive Office of Energy and Environmental Affairs
- Orenda Wildlife Land Trust
- Town of Falmouth Conservation Commission
- Town of Mashpee Conservation Commission
- U.S. Fish and Wildlife Service
- Wampanoag Indian Tribal Council (Mashpee Wampanoag Tribe)
- Waquoit Bay National Estuarine Research Reserve (WBNERR) / Massachusetts Department of Conservation and Recreation

== Friends of Mashpee National Wildlife Refuge ==
The Friends of Mashpee National Wildlife Refuge is a nonprofit organization which supports education, research and stewardship projects within the Mashpee National Wildlife Refuge (MNWR). In 2019, the Friends group published a history book about the MNWR, available for download from the website of the U.S. Fish and Wildlife Service.

== History ==
- See: How We Got Here: The History of the Mashpee National Wildlife Refuge
