= Monomoscoy Island, Massachusetts =

Monomoscoy Island
- Census-designated place
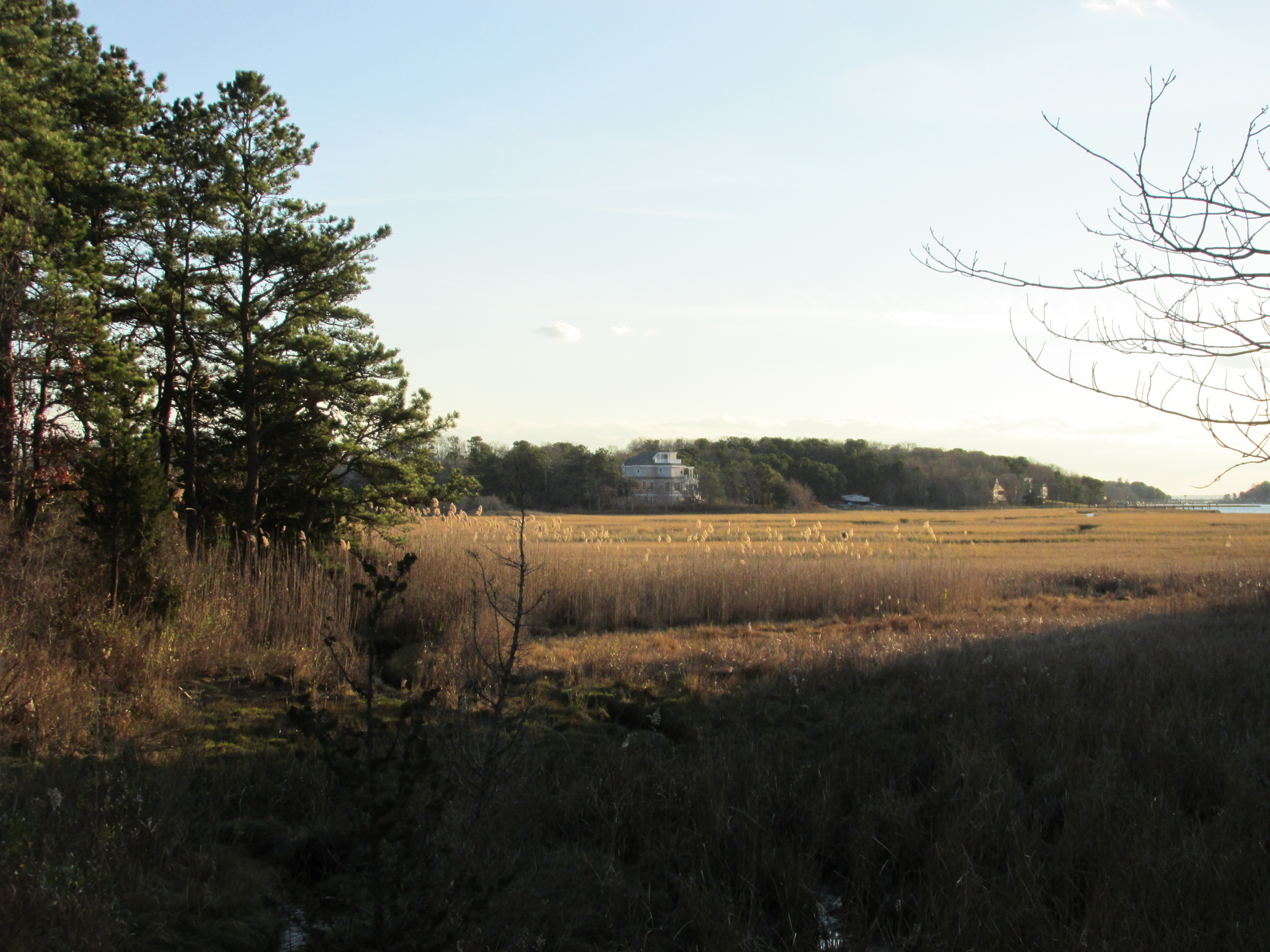
- Monomoscoy Island

- Location in Barnstable County and the state of Massachusetts
- Coordinates: 41°34′12″N 70°30′17″W
- Country: United States
- State: Massachusetts
- County: Barnstable
- Town: Mashpee

Area
  - Total: 0.23 sq mi (0.60 km^{2})
  - Land: 0.23 sq mi (0.60 km^{2})
  - Water: 0 sq mi (0.00 km^{2})
- Elevation: 6.6 ft (2 m)

Population (2020)
  - Total: 139
  - Density: 600.4/sq mi (231.82/km^{2})
- Time zone: UTC-5 (Eastern (EST))
  - Summer (DST): UTC-4 (EDT)
- ZIP Code: 02649 (Mashpee)
- FIPS code: 25-41960
- GNIS feature ID: 1877296

Monomoscoy Island is a census-designated place (CDP) in the town of Mashpee in Barnstable County, Massachusetts, United States. As of the 2020 census, Monomoscoy Island had a population of 139.

== Geography ==
Monomoscoy Island is located in the southern part of the town of Mashpee at 41°34′12″N 70°30′17″W (41.569951, -70.504593). It is bordered by the tidal Little River and Hamblin Pond to the northwest and by the Great River to the southeast, and is connected to the mainland of Cape Cod by Monomoscoy Road, which crosses tidal marshes to the northeast. A portion of the CDP is on the Cape Cod mainland, bordered on the north by Amy Brown Road; it is therefore technically not a true island. Neighboring CDPs, all in the town of Mashpee, are Seconsett Island to the west across the Little River, Seabrook to the northwest, and a portion of the New Seabury CDP to the east, across the Great River.

According to the United States Census Bureau, the Monomoscoy Island CDP has a total area of 0.23 square miles (0.6 km^{2}), all land.

== Demographics ==
Historical population
Census	Pop.	Note	%±
2020	139		—
U.S. Decennial Census

As of the census of 2000, there were 152 people, 81 households, and 46 families residing in the CDP. The population density was 244.5/km^{2} (625.6/mi^{2}). There were 152 housing units at an average density of 244.5/km^{2} (625.6/mi^{2}). The racial makeup of the CDP was 97.37% White, 1.32% Native American, and 1.32% Asian.

There were 81 households, out of which 16.0% had children under the age of 18 living with them, 46.9% were married couples living together, 7.4% had a female householder with no husband present, and 43.2% were non-families. 37.0% of all households were made up of individuals, and 19.8% had someone living alone who was 65 years of age or older. The average household size was 1.88 and the average family size was 2.39.

In the CDP, the population was spread out, with 13.8% under the age of 18, 2.0% from 18 to 24, 21.1% from 25 to 44, 38.2% from 45 to 64, and 25.0% who were 65 years of age or older. The median age was 53 years. For every 100 females, there were 78.8 males. For every 100 females age 18 and over, there were 79.5 males.

The median income for a household in the CDP was $37,589, and the median income for a family was $34,444. Males had a median income of $36,250 versus $18,333 for females. The per capita income for the island was $19,927. None of the population were below the poverty line.
