= Mashpee River Reservation =

Park in Massachusetts, United States

Coordinates: 41°37′22″N 70°28′51″W

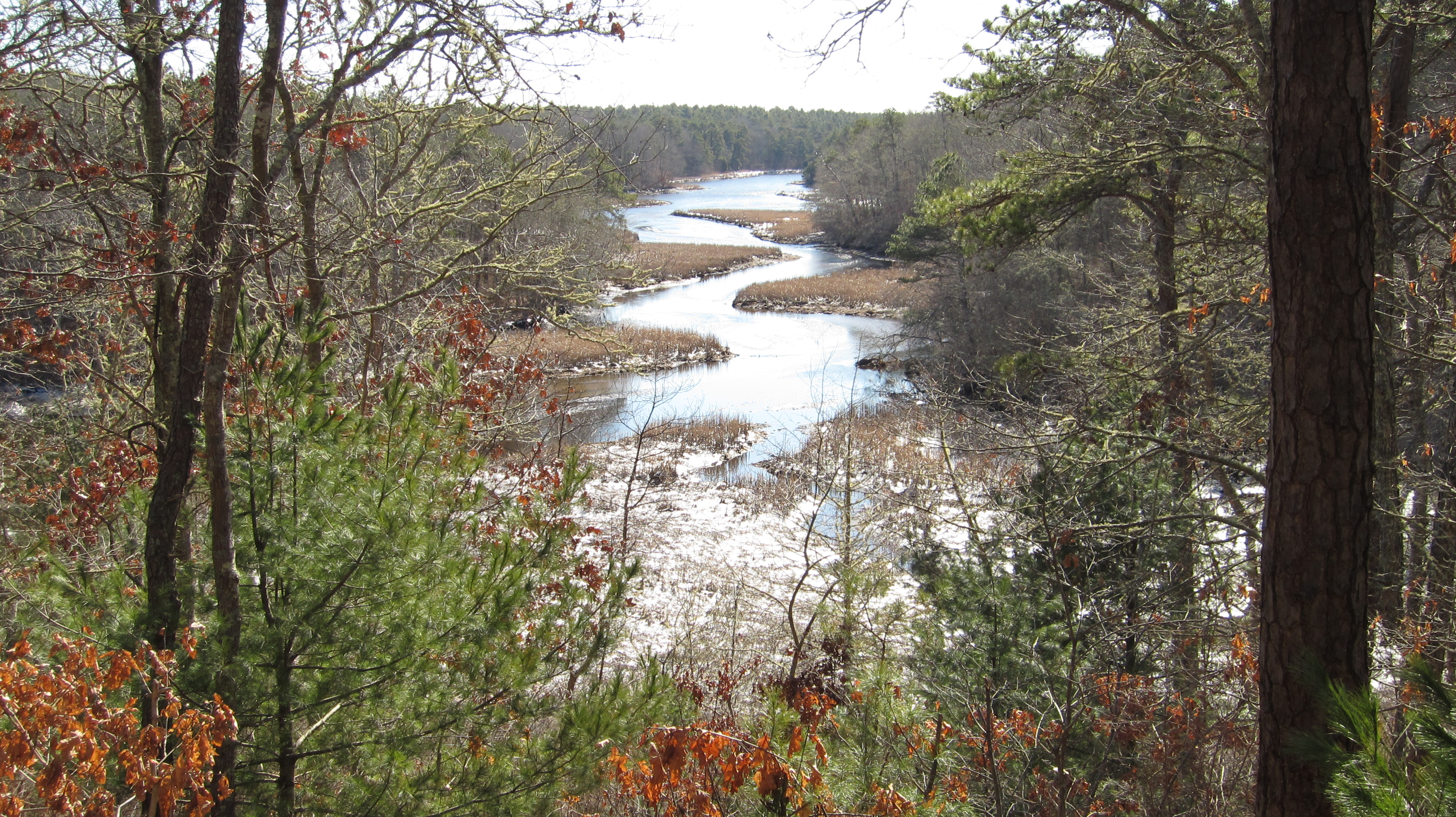
Mashpee River

Mashpee River Reservation is a park in Mashpee, Massachusetts on the Mashpee River. The Trustees of Reservations owns and maintains the park.

Pristine shoreline, natural spawning areas, and excellent water quality make the Mashpee River one of Massachusetts' finest sources of sea-run brook trout. Since at least 1915, spirited conservation efforts have led to the protection of this five-mile tidal river which begins at Mashpee and Wakeby Ponds and empties into Pirate's Cove on Popponesset Bay.

This area has two miles of trails through the Mashpee River Reservation plus additional connecting trails on property of other conservation organizations and town and state government properties. The Reservation's woodland and shoreline trails form a link in the Cape Cod Pathways.

== History ==
In the early decades of the 20th century, John W. Farley, an avid fisherman and naturalist, acquired contiguous parcels of land along the Mashpee River and established a small campground and canoe launch. He donated this land to the public in 1959 and an additional grant by Pemberton Whitcomb in 1979 increased the park's size. The Trustees of Reservations purchased more land in 1998.
