= Old Indian Meeting House =

Native American church in Massachusetts, United States

- U.S. National Register of Historic Places
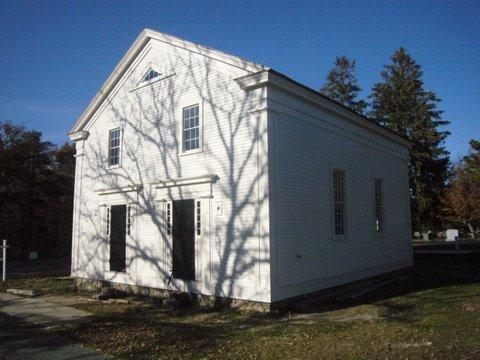

- Location within Cape Cod Location within Massachusetts Location within the United States
- Location: 410 Meetinghouse Rd., Mashpee, Massachusetts
- Coordinates: 41°37′28″N 70°28′45″W
- Area: 6.8 acres (2.8 ha)
- Built: 1758
- Architects: Hinckley, Deacon John
- Architectural style: Colonial, Greek Revival, Italianate
- NRHP reference No.: 98001383
- Added to NRHP: December 3, 1998

The Old Indian Meeting House (also known as the Old Indian Church) is a historic meeting house at 410 Meetinghouse Road in Mashpee, Massachusetts. Built in 1758, the meetinghouse is the oldest Native American church in the eastern United States. The building was listed on the National Register of Historic Places in 1998.

== Description ==
The Old Indian Meeting House stands on the east side of Meetinghouse Road, north of its junction with Falmouth Street. It is located at the western end of a cemetery which extends between the two roads, on 7 acres (2.8 ha) of land that extend to the junction. It is a 1-1/2 story wood frame structure, with a gabled roof and clapboarded exterior. It has a Greek Revival exterior, with corner pilasters rising to entablatures that run along the roofline on the sides. There are two symmetrically placed entrances on the front facade, each framed by pilasters and a corniced entablature. A triangular transom window is set in the gable above, and there are fixed-pane windows above the entrances.

== History ==
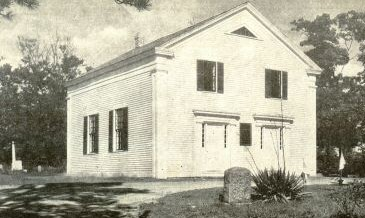
Old Indian Meeting House c. 1905

The first church to be built in Mashpee was built in 1670. In 1684, a second meeting house was built. That building was moved about 1717 to another site in Mashpee. In 1758, a meeting house is described as being at the present site; it is unclear whether this was an altered version of the 1684 building, moved to this site and enlarged, or whether it was a new construction. It was used by the Wampanoag Native Americans as a Christian church. In 1717 the church was moved from its original location in the town to its current one, and the building was remodeled. The building also served as a school. In the late eighteenth century, a cemetery ("burial ground") was founded on the church grounds.

With almost four centuries of Native American leadership and ministry, the Old Meeting House is a place of historic and spiritual significance to the Mashpee Wampanoag tribe. In 1833 it was the site of the Mashpee Revolt, when tribal members and their minister, William Apess (Pequot), protested state intrusions on their self-governance, and white settlers' theft of wood from tribal lands. The site was re-dedicated in 1923 under the leadership of Nelson D. Simons, and the site was added to the National Register of Historic Places in 1998. In 2009, the Mashpee tribe celebrated its reconstruction and formal re-opening.

== See also ==
- National Register of Historic Places listings in Barnstable County, Massachusetts
- Oldest churches in the United States
- Praying Indian
