= South Cape Beach State Park =

State park in Massachusetts, US

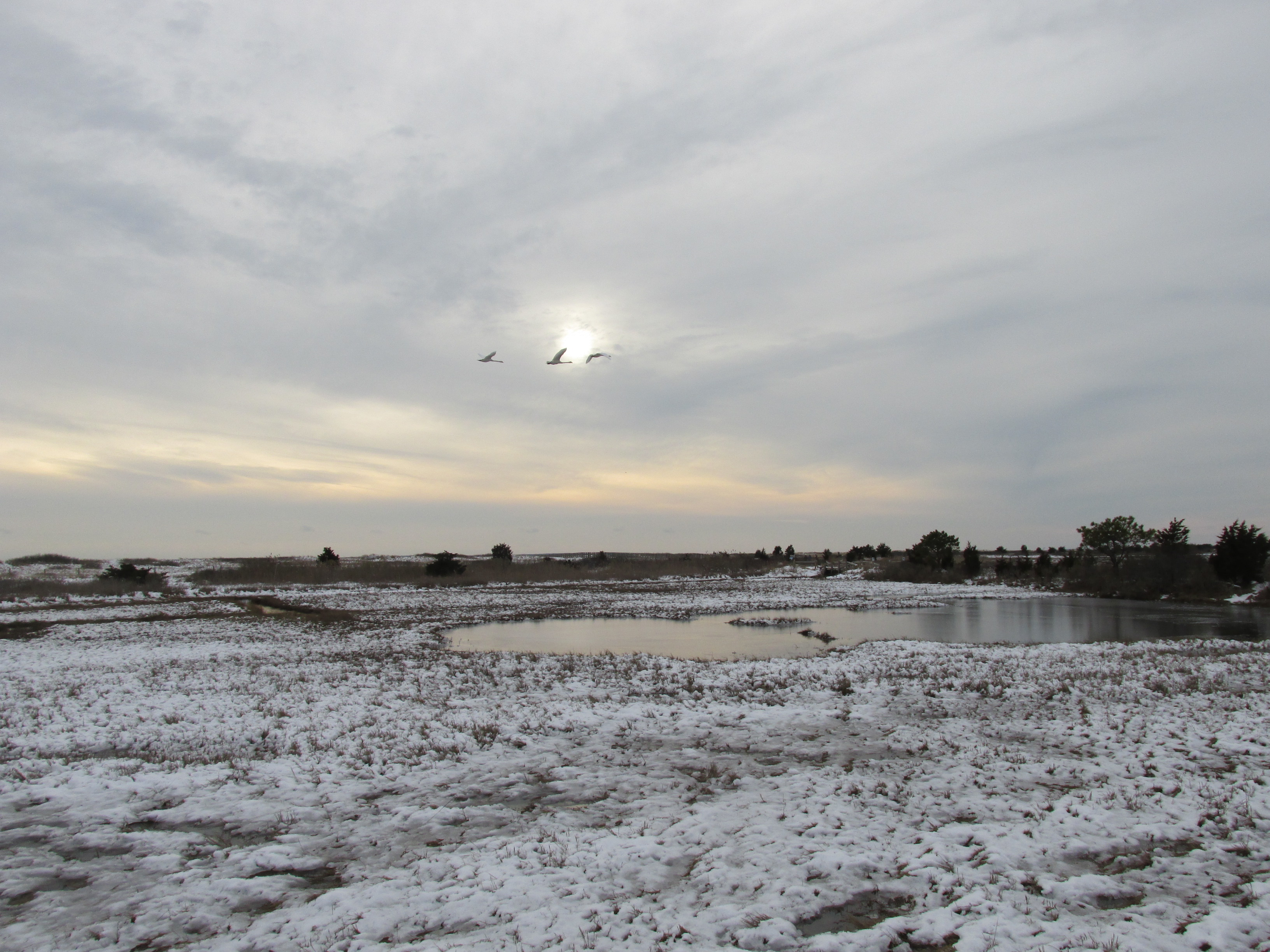

- Location within Massachusetts Location within the United States
- Location: Mashpee, Massachusetts, United States
- Coordinates: 41°33′12″N 70°30′01″W
- Area: 460 acres (190 ha)
- Administrator: Massachusetts Department of Conservation and Recreation
- Website: Official website

South Cape Beach State Park is a Massachusetts state park located in the town of Mashpee. It is part of the Waquoit Bay National Estuarine Research Reserve. The park is situated between Waquoit Bay and Vineyard Sound and features barrier beach and dunes, salt marsh, scrub oak and pitch pine woodland and kettle ponds and is managed by the Department of Conservation and Recreation.

== Activities and amenities ==
- Swimming: The park has a 1-mile (1.6 km) white sand beach that is handicap-accessible with handicap-accessible restrooms.
- Trails: Facilities for hiking and walking include over-the-dune boardwalks and scenic viewing areas.
- In addition to motorized and non-motorized boating, the park also offers fishing, interpretive programs during the summer months, and restricted hunting.
