= Mashpee Neck, Massachusetts =

- Census-designated place
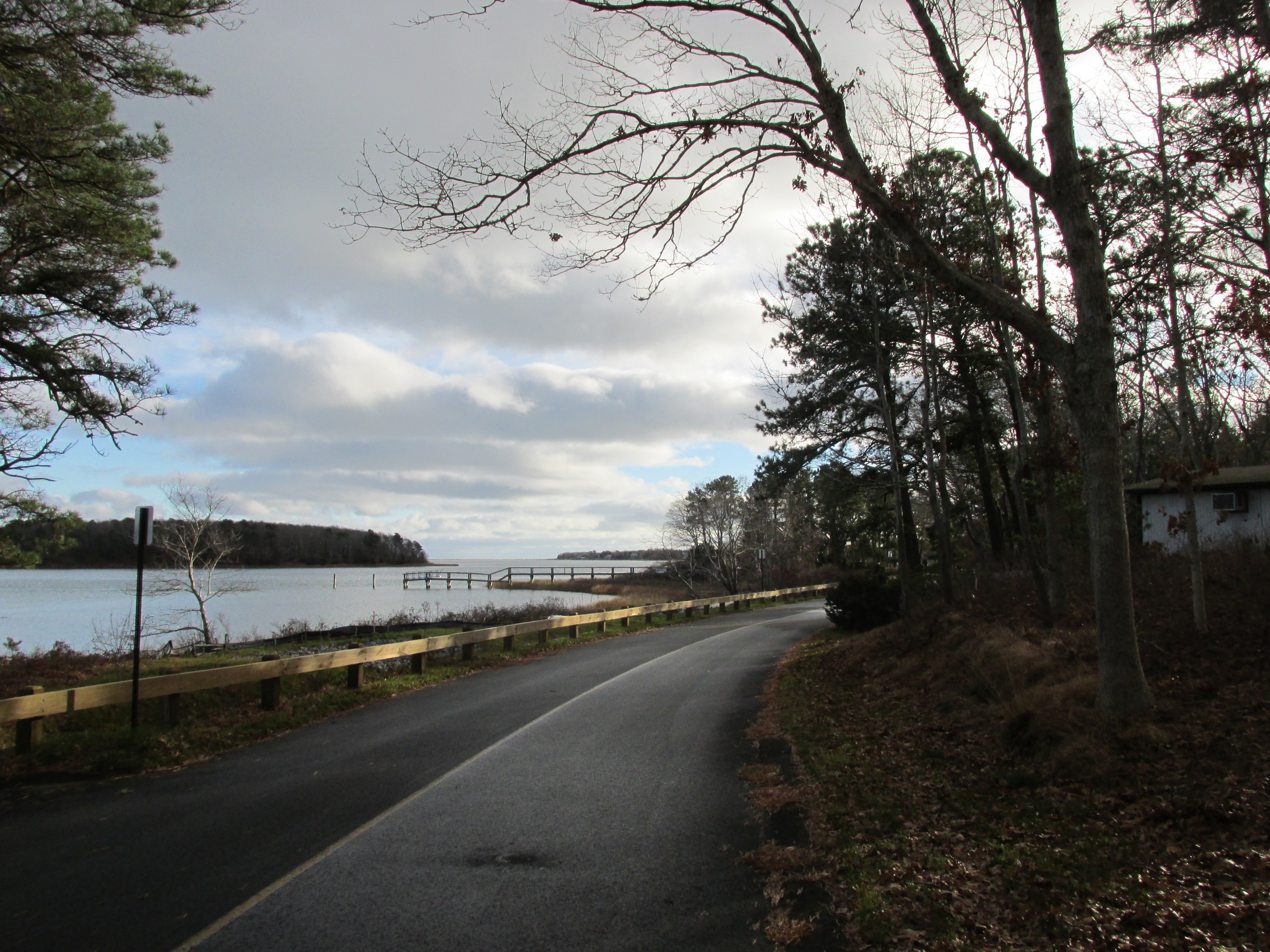
- Mashpee Neck Road

- Location in Barnstable County and the state of Massachusetts.
- Coordinates: 41°36′37″N 70°27′54″W
- Country: United States
- State: Massachusetts
- County: Barnstable
- Town: Mashpee

Area
  - Total: 1.44 sq mi (3.72 km^{2})
  - Land: 1.27 sq mi (3.28 km^{2})
  - Water: 0.17 sq mi (0.44 km^{2})
- Elevation: 39 ft (12 m)

Population (2020)
  - Total: 1,076
  - Density: 849.8/sq mi (328.11/km^{2})
- Time zone: UTC-5 (Eastern (EST))
  - Summer (DST): UTC-4 (EDT)
- ZIP Code: 02649 (Mashpee)
- FIPS code: 25-39152
- GNIS feature ID: 1877295

Mashpee Neck is a census-designated place (CDP) in the town of Mashpee in Barnstable County, Massachusetts, United States. As of the 2020 census, Mashpee Neck had a population of 1,076. It is the most populous of the seven CDPs in Mashpee.

== Geography ==
Mashpee Neck is located in the eastern part of the town of Mashpee at 41°36′37″N 70°27′54″W (41.610357, -70.465072). It occupies the neck of land between the tidal Mashpee River to the west and Shoestring Bay to the east. It is bordered to the north by Quinaquisset Avenue. The Cotuit area of the town of Barnstable is to the east, across Shoestring Bay.

According to the United States Census Bureau, the Mashpee Neck CDP has a total area of 1.5 square miles (3.8 km^{2}), of which 1.3 square miles (3.3 km^{2}) is land, and 0.19 square miles (0.5 km^{2}), or 12.83%, is water.

== Demographics ==
Historical population
Census	Pop.	Note	%±
2020	1,076		—
U.S. Decennial Census

At the 2000 census, there were 901 people, 352 households and 260 families residing in the CDP. The population density was 276.1/km^{2} (715.4/mi^{2}). There were 518 housing units at an average density of 158.7/km^{2} (411.3/mi^{2}). The racial makeup of the CDP was 92.90% White, 2.66% African American, 0.89% Native American, 0.89% Asian, 0.11% Pacific Islander, 0.44% from other races, and 2.11% from two or more races. Hispanic or Latino of any race were 0.55% of the population.

There were 352 households, of which 34.1% had children under the age of 18 living with them, 61.9% were married couples living together, 9.4% had a female householder with no husband present, and 25.9% were non-families. 21.0% of all households were made up of individuals, and 8.2% had someone living alone who was 65 years of age or older. The average household size was 2.56 and the average family size was 3.01.

Age distribution was 27.5% under the age of 18, 2.4% from 18 to 24, 31.1% from 25 to 44, 26.2% from 45 to 64, and 12.8% who were 65 years of age or older. The median age was 38 years. For every 100 females, there were 105.7 males. For every 100 females age 18 and over, there were 98.5 males.

The median household income was $50,726, and the median family income was $53,750. Males had a median income of $47,169 versus $35,568 for females. The per capita income for the CDP was $24,329. About 2.1% of families and 5.5% of the population were below the poverty line, including 3.6% of those under age 18 and 18.7% of those age 65 or over.
