= Paula Peters =

American journalist

Paula Peters is a journalist, educator and activist. A member of the Wampanoag tribe, she has spent most of her life in her tribal homeland of Mashpee, Massachusetts. She hails from a prominent Mashpee Wampanoag family, including Tribal Chairman Russell "Fast Turtle" Peters (her father), and was active in the tribe's long and contested push for federal recognition. In a 2006 interview with NPR, Peters recalled a time when "nobody in Washington cared much about which tribes were recognized." Like her father before her, Peters served on the Mashpee Wampanoag Tribal Council. In 2005, she ran against Glenn Marshall for Council Chairperson.

== Writing career ==
Peters has made several endeavors outside the realm of journalism. In 2009 she presented her work, "Wampanoag Reflections" to the Massachusetts Society of Mayflower Descendants in Cohasset, Massachusetts. She has written several essays, including "A Lesser-Known Atlantic Crossing" and "Epanow's Escape." Peters's work has been republished in an anthology of Native American writing from New England, including "Wampanoag Reflections," as well as a piece about cultural appropriation called "Beware: Not All Terms Are Fair Game".

Peters is also the author of Mashpee Nine: A Story of Cultural Justice, published by SmokeSygnals in 2016.

== Public education career ==
In addition to her writing and consulting, Peters has worked as a public educator of Native history. She served for a time as Director of Marketing and Public Relations for the Wampanoag Indian Program at Plimoth Plantation.

Peters has joined the committee of Plymouth, 400 Inc., a non-profit organization committed to planning a commemoration for the 400th anniversary of the landing of the Mayflower in 1620.; she represents Wampanoag interests on the organization's board of directors. In this capacity, she also served as the executive producer and a main contributor to the exhibit "Captured: 1614" located at the Plymouth Public Library in Plymouth, Massachusetts. The exhibit, unveiled in November 2014, marked the 400th anniversary of the kidnapping of Squanto and 19 other Wampanoag tribe members, who were brought to Europe to be sold as slaves. The exhibit, conceptualized and designed by Peters's company Smoke Sygnals, seeks to inform the public about what happened with Native Americans in the years prior to 1620. The exhibit explains how Squanto and Samoset were so well-equipped to communicate with American settlers when they landed at Plymouth Rock; Peters sees it as lending Wampanoag voice to the telling of American history.

== Journalism and Opinion Pieces ==
- "Wal-Mart rumor has Falmouth talking." Cape Cod Times, October 10, 1998.
- "Martha's Vineyard Supports New Bedford." Cape Cod Times, March 30, 1999.
- "Back on Track." Cape Cod Times, March 12, 2000.
- "Worlds Rejoined." Cape Cod Times, July 13, 2002.
- "Nantucket Dealer Tied to Stolen Document." Cape Cod Times, April 5, 2003.
- "Young Artist Spreads Cheer." Cape Cod Times, November 26, 2006.
- "Wampanoag Didn't Need to Cheat." Cape Cod Times, December 19, 2008.
