= Washburn Island, Massachusetts =

Island in Barnstable County, Massachusetts, United States

Coordinates: 41°33′30″N 70°32′08″W

Washburn Island is a 330-acre (1.3 km^{2}) island off the coast of East Falmouth, Massachusetts within Waquoit Bay. It is home to some primitive campsites and is part of the Waquoit Bay National Estuarine Research Reserve. It is part of the Town of Falmouth, in Barnstable County in the village of Waquoit.

During World War II, the island was home to Camp Washburn.

== Ecosystem ==
Washburn Island contains marshes, sand dunes, and small ponds, and pine and oak trees make up the woods of the island.

== History ==
Washburn Island was originally named Menauhant by the native people. At some points in time the island was owned as land by people. The island at one point had three farms on the island in the mid-nineteenth century, and parts of the island were cleared of trees in order to fit the farms as well as space for cattle to graze. Two of the three farms didn't last to see the end of the century.

The island was one of the last undeveloped coastal properties on Cape Cod. Washburn Island is bordered by the Seapit River and Eel Pond. Various coastal storms caused the island to reconnect and separate from the mainland on and off, but, as of now, it is a true island. Artifacts dating back 450–1000 years, including hammer flakes and shell middens, have been found on the island. In 1983, The Commonwealth of Massachusetts acquired the island in order to make it a state park of the state park system.
