= Adrian Haynes =

American politician (1926–2014)

Adrian Haynes (Poponsesset in Wampanoag, February 28, 1926 – April 26, 2014) was a chief of the Mashpee Wampanoag and a United States Navy veteran of World War II.

== Biography ==
Born in Mashpee, Massachusetts, on Cape Cod in 1926, Haynes was a son of Clinton Mye Haynes and Daisy F. Mingo. He was the brother of Clinton, Jr.; Vernon, Tisquantum, Violet, Anita, Rita, Naomi and Nickomas. His family were Wampanoag people, who had long historic ties to this land. He went to local schools.

During World War II, he served in the United States Navy from 1943 to 1947. He was with the Naval Supply Ninth Amphibian Force that took part in the 1944 Anzio invasion in Italy, and was decorated for his service. Always proud of his military service, he was a member of Veterans of Foreign Wars John Glass Post 2188, American Legion Simeon L. Nickerson Post 64, and the Disabled American Veterans Cpl. William F. Reardon Chapter 57 of Taunton.

Haynes lived in Middleboro, Massachusetts, as an adult. He worked in foundries, was a truck driver and also worked at a state hospital. He worked with the Wampanoag at Aquinnah (formerly Gay's Head) on Martha's Vineyard to found a museum for their history. He also worked in a dance hall there.

Haynes was a Wampanoag chief, known as Poponsesset in his language, meaning Silver Beech. He was well respected and helped the community maintain cohesion. He was able to see his people gain federal recognition as a tribe in 2007. He died in Plymouth, Massachusetts, and was buried at Old Indian Church Cemetery in Mashpee.
