= Seabrook, Massachusetts =

- Census-designated place
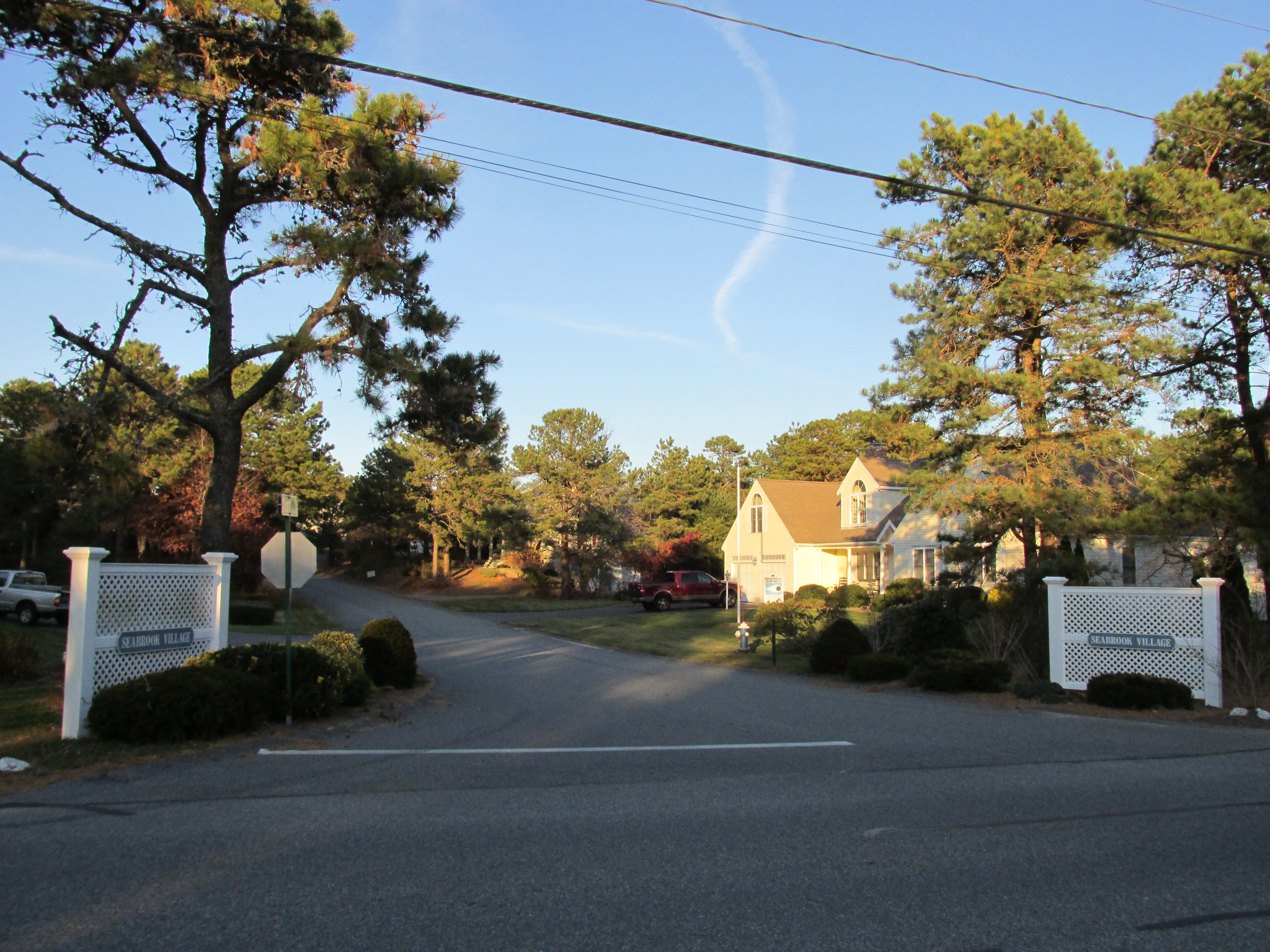
- Surf Drive

- Location in Barnstable County and the state of Massachusetts.
- Coordinates: 41°34′55″N 70°29′55″W
- Country: United States
- State: Massachusetts
- County: Barnstable
- Town: Mashpee

Area
  - Total: 0.36 sq mi (0.92 km^{2})
  - Land: 0.35 sq mi (0.91 km^{2})
  - Water: 0.0039 sq mi (0.01 km^{2})
- Elevation: 16 ft (5 m)

Population (2020)
  - Total: 448
  - Density: 1,272.9/sq mi (491.47/km^{2})
- Time zone: UTC-5 (Eastern (EST))
  - Summer (DST): UTC-4 (EDT)
- ZIP Code: 02649 (Mashpee)
- FIPS code: 25-60505
- GNIS feature ID: 1877300

Seabrook is a census-designated place (CDP) in the town of Mashpee in Barnstable County, Massachusetts, United States. As of the 2020 census, Seabrook had a population of 448.

== Geography ==
Seabrook is located in the southern part of the town of Mashpee along its western border at 41°34′55″N 70°29′55″W (41.582070, -70.498618). It is bounded by the town of Falmouth to the west, by Old Ockway Road to the northeast, by a short segment of Red Brook Road and by the Monomoscoy Island CDP to the southeast, and by Hamblin Pond to the south.

According to the United States Census Bureau, the CDP has a total area of 0.35 square miles (0.9 km^{2}), all land.

== Demographics ==
Historical population
Census	Pop.	Note	%±
2000	477		—
2010	455		−4.6%
2020	448		−1.5%
U.S. Decennial Census

As of the census of 2000, there were 477 people, 187 households, and 154 families residing in the CDP. The population density was 497.8/km^{2} (1,300.6/mi^{2}). There were 229 housing units at an average density of 239.0/km^{2} (624.4/mi^{2}). The racial makeup of the CDP was 99.58% White, 0.21% African American, 0.21% from other races.

There were 187 households, out of which 25.7% had children under the age of 18 living with them, 73.3% were married couples living together, 7.5% had a female householder with no husband present, and 17.6% were non-families. 14.4% of all households were made up of individuals, and 5.3% had someone living alone who was 65 years of age or older. The average household size was 2.55 and the average family size was 2.76.

In the CDP, the population was spread out, with 20.5% under the age of 18, 4.0% from 18 to 24, 22.6% from 25 to 44, 26.8% from 45 to 64, and 26.0% who were 65 years of age or older. The median age was 47 years. For every 100 females, there were 87.8 males. For every 100 females age 18 and over, there were 87.6 males.

The median income for a household in the CDP was $70,536, and the median income for a family was $78,540. Males had a median income of $50,208 versus $43,646 for females. The per capita income for the CDP was $29,097. None of the families and 1.5% of the population were living below the poverty line, including no under eighteens and none of those over 64.

== Climate ==
In a typical year, Seabrook, Massachusetts temperatures fall below 50 °F (10 °C) for 167 days per year. Annual precipitation is typically 45.8 inches per year (high for the US) and snow covers the ground 0 days per year, or 0% of the year (the lowest in the US). It may be helpful to understand the yearly precipitation by imagining nine straight days of moderate rain per year. The humidity is below 60% for approximately 27.6 days, or 7.6% of the year.
