= Mashpee Middle-High School =

Coordinates: 41°36′54″N 70°30′25″W

- 500 Old Barnstable Rd., Mashpee, Massachusetts 02649; United States

Information
- Type: Public; Open enrollment
- Established: 1996
- Principal: Bonnie Brady
- Staff: 64.13 (FTE)
- Grades: 7–12
- Enrollment: 620 (2023–2024)
- Student to teacher ratio: 9.67
- Campus: Suburban
- Colors: Blue, white, and black
- Athletics: MIAA - Division 4
- Athletics conference: South Shore League
- Mascot: Falcon
- Rivals: Sandwich, Monomoy, Abington, Cohasset
- Newspaper: "The Falconer"
- Yearbook: "Legacy"
- Website: mmhs.mpspk12.org

Mashpee Middle-High School is a public middle-high school located in Mashpee, Massachusetts, United States. It is located at the intersection of Old Barnstable Road and Route 151, and is the home of the Technology "Center of Excellence".

== History ==
Mashpee High School opened in 1996. Before then, Mashpee students attended neighboring Falmouth High School. In the early 1990s, Mashpee voted to open its own high school after the town had experienced an exponential increase in its population. Since 1970, Mashpee's town population has increased by ten times in size and was one of the state's fastest growing towns from 1970-2000. The town population as of the 2010 census is approximately 14,000 and the student population is roughly 1,700.

Mashpee High School originally served students in grades 7–12, but in 2008, the school board decided to separate high school students from the 7th and 8th grade students. Mashpee High School now served students in grades 9–12, and the 7th and 8th grade students attend the newly established Mashpee Middle School, which is located in the same building as Mashpee High School, but runs under its own administration, has its own teachers and staff, and has its own sports teams separate from the high school.

In 2014, the middle & high schools were once again consolidated to run under one administration. The middle school is represented by a headmaster who runs under direction of the principal. Due to the re-consolidation, 8th grade students in the school will be allowed to participate in high school level athletics, including the varsity level, while 7th graders will only be allowed to participate in middle school level athletics, unless certain athletic teams or programs are not offered at the middle school program. In which case, 7th graders will be allowed to compete in high school athletics at only the junior varsity level. The athletics waiver was granted by the MIAA and took effect during the 2015-2016 academic year.

Every year since 2004, Mashpee High School’s graduation has opened with a traditional Wampanoag language travel blessing, followed by a traditional Wampanoag drum circle song and performance by the "Red Hawk Singers", who perform two traditional travel and blessing Wampanoag songs.

== Athletics ==
Mashpee is a member of the South Shore League, which primarily competes in Division 4, with exceptions (Football is Division 7, Girls Hockey is Division 2, Gymnastics is Division 1). The South Shore League is regarded as one of the premier small school conferences in the state.

=== Fall Sports ===
- Boys Soccer
- Girls Soccer
- Field Hockey (co-op w/ Bourne & Wareham)
- Football
- Fall Cheerleading
- Volleyball
- Cross Country
- Golf

=== Winter Sports ===
- Boys Basketball (V, JV, Frosh, MS)
- Girls Basketball (V, JV, MS)
- Boys Ice Hockey (co-op with Monomoy)
- Girls Ice Hockey (co-op with Sandwich)
- Winter Cheerleading
- Wrestling (co-op with Falmouth)
- Gymnastics (co-op with Falmouth and Barnstable)
- Boys Track
- Girls Track

=== Spring Sports ===
- Baseball
- Softball
- Boys Lacrosse (co-op with Bourne)
- Girls Lacrosse
- Boys Tennis
- Girls Tennis
- Boys Track
- Girls Track

Accomplishments

- Football State Champions - 2011, 2015, 2016, 2017
- Football State Finalist - 2024
- Track & Field State Champions - 2001
- Spring 4x100 Relay State Champions - 2012
- Boys' Basketball State Finalist - 2000, 2001, 2018
- Baseball Sectional Finalists - 2015, 2016
- Golf State Finalists - 2019, 2020, 2021
