= Mashpee Commons =

Lifestyle center in Massachusetts

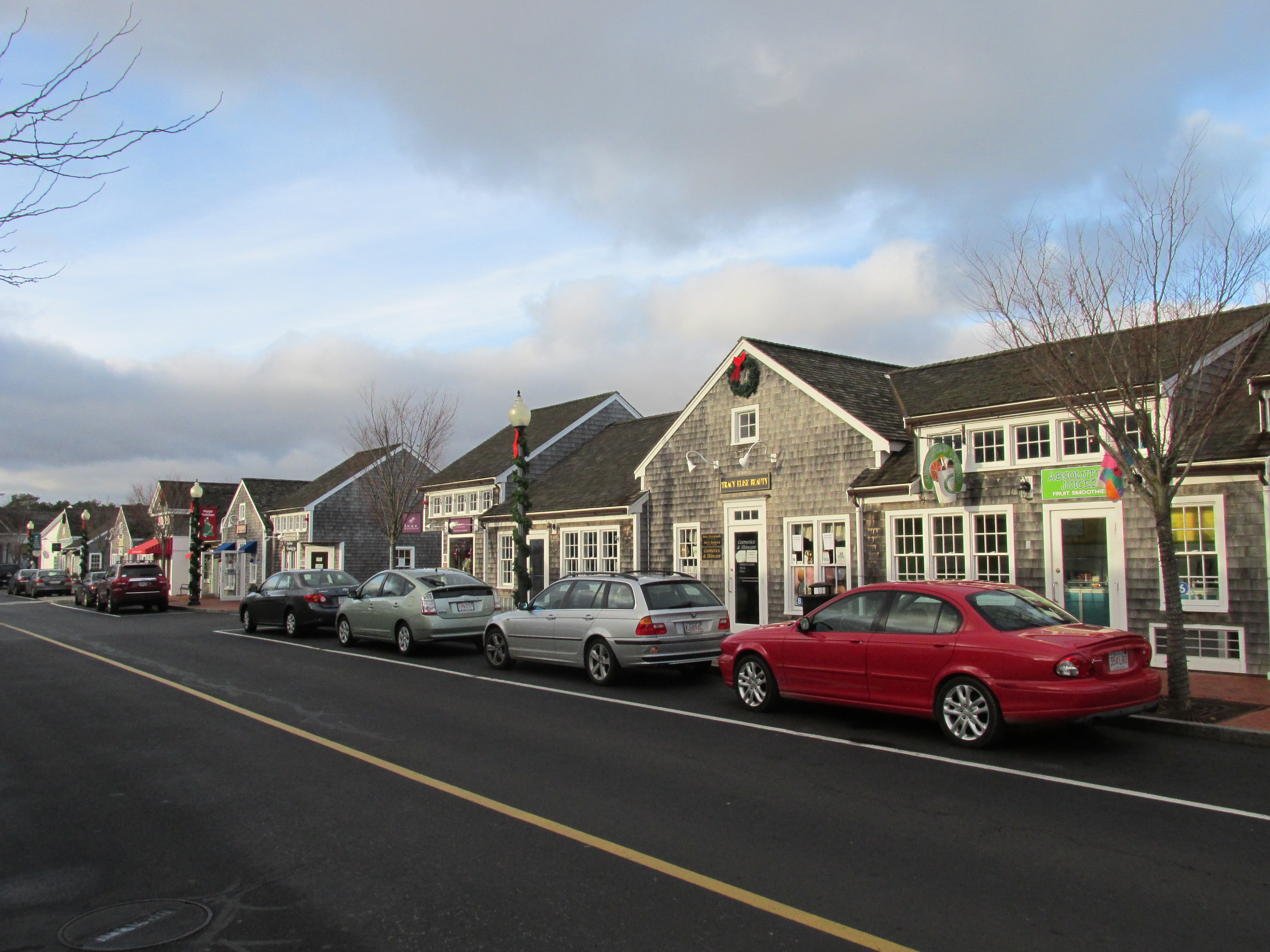
- North Street
- Location: Mashpee, Massachusetts, United States
- Coordinates: 41°37′1.51″N 70°29′23.62″W
- Developer: Cornish Development Associates
- Manager: Mashpee Commons Limited Partnership
- Architect: Duany Plater-Zyberk & Company
- Num. of stores: 95
- Num. of anchor tenants: Stop & Shop, L. L. Bean (formerly GAP), Talbots
- Floor area: 278,946 square feet (25,914.9 m^{2})
- Website: mashpeecommons.com

Mashpee Commons is a lifestyle center located on Cape Cod in the town of Mashpee, Massachusetts. The center opened in 1986 and is considered to be an early example of new urbanist development.

== History ==
Mashpee Commons occupies the former site of the New Seabury Shopping Center; the original strip mall was constructed in 1960 and initially consisted of 62,000 square feet (5,800 m^{2}) of retail floor area. By the early 1980s the Field Point Corporation, owners of the New Seabury Shopping Center, sought to convert the site into a mixed-used district. Field Point contracted Andres Duany and Elizabeth Plater-Zyberk, the planners of Seaside, Florida, and the founders of the Congress for the New Urbanism, to design the conversion. The original four single-story flat-roofed buildings were renovated with new facades, and the parking lot was redeveloped as streets and blocks bordered by two-story buildings that typically housed offices or residential units above shops; parking is curbside and located behind the buildings. The site reopened as Mashpee Commons in 1986 and has had several expansions since.

== Design ==
Much of the design of Mashpee Common is attributed to the new urbanism movement that emerged during the early 1980s. New urbanist elements such as rear parking, street-facing structures, and pedestrianized areas are present in Mashpee Commons. The architectural design of the center is derivative of traditional New England town centers, featuring a mix of colonial-style facades. Mashpee Commons is classified as a lifestyle center and contains a limited amount of multifunctional development, with most of the off-street parking being relegated to a large surface lot that encircles the main retail area similar to a traditional shopping mall.

== See also ==
- Cape Cod Mall
