= Quashnet River =

Estuary in Massachusetts, United States

Coordinates: 41.573°N 70.518°W

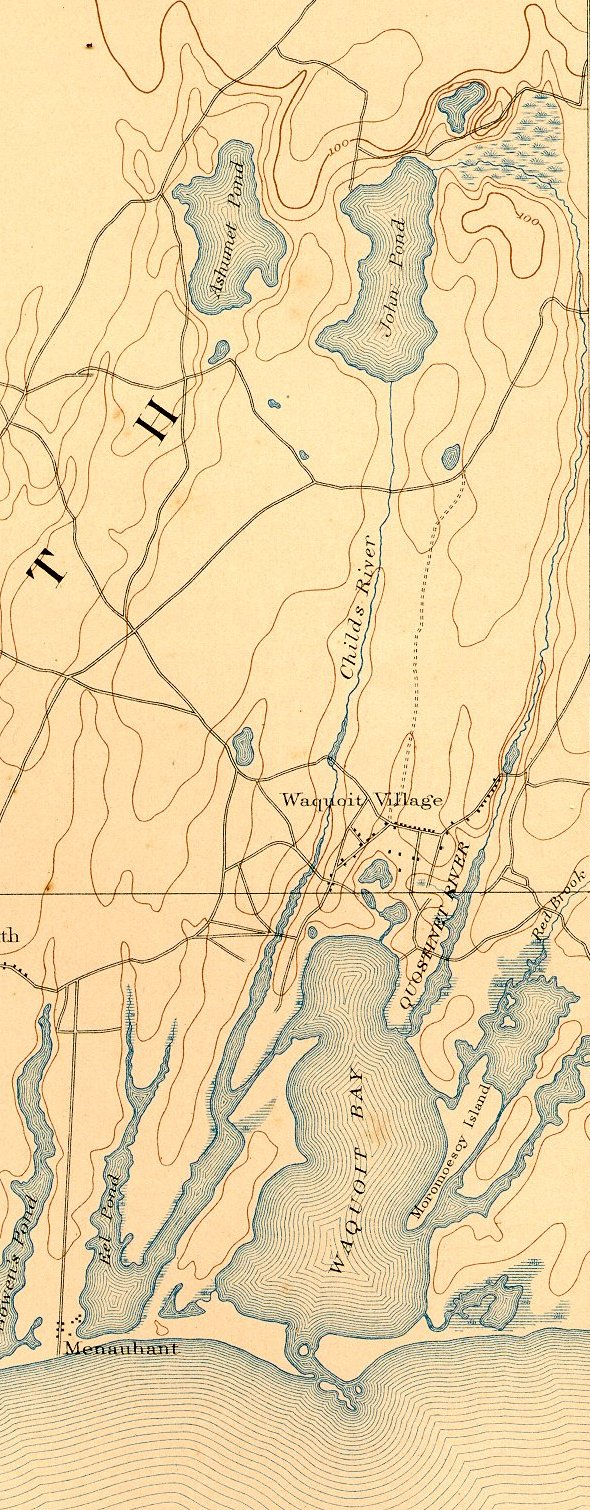
Quashnet River and environs

The Quashnet River, also known as Quoshnet River or Moonakis River, is a 5.1-mile-long (8.2 km) estuary in Falmouth, Massachusetts on Cape Cod. Its area is about 1-square-mile (2.6 km^{2}).

The river is connected by ditch to John's Pond in Mashpee, just north of today's Route 28. It is fed by groundwater and flows south, gaining water as it goes, into Waquoit Bay which then flows into Nantucket Sound. During colonial times it was known for its abundant brook trout but was dammed in the mid-19th century for water power. After the mills burned and the dam was breached, the valley was converted to cranberry cultivation in the early 20th century. Cranberry production stopped in the 1950s, and the cranberry bogs were abandoned. The land was purchased by the Commonwealth of Massachusetts beginning in the late 1950s, and Trout Unlimited and other organizations began to restore the river to trout-quality in the 1970s.

Today the river is an important migratory fish run for alewife and salter brook trout, home to herring and eels, and is Waquoit Bay's largest source of fresh water. Additional portions of its watershed were purchased through the years by various entities. The area is now a wildlife management and conservation preserve managed by the Waquoit Bay National Estuarine Research Reserve.

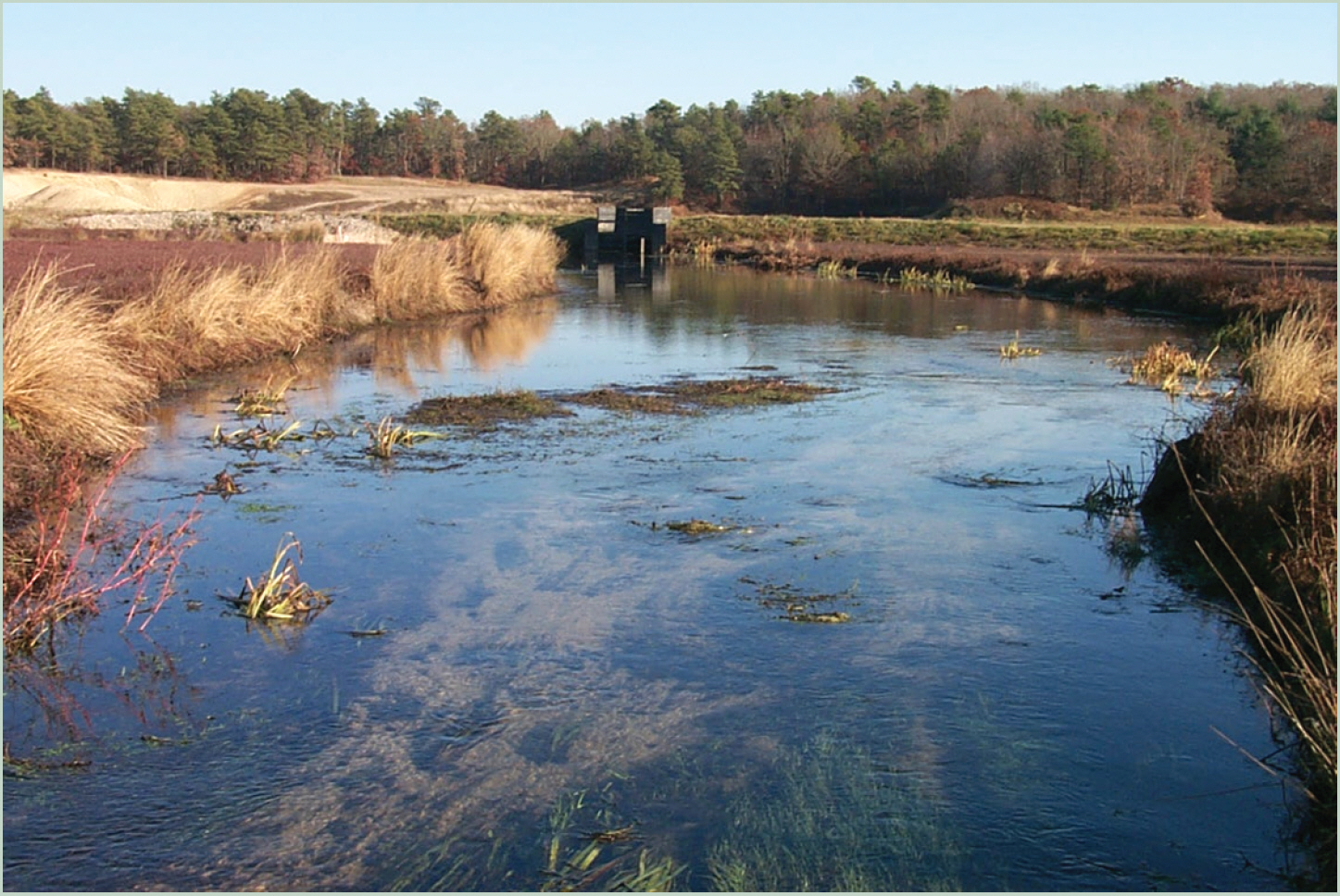
Quashnet River
