= Sandwich High School =

Sandwich Middle High School

Location
- 365 Quaker Meetinghouse Road; East Sandwich, Massachusetts; 02537-1398; United States; 41°44′8.4″N 70°27′32.0″W

Information
- Type: Public; Open enrollment
- Established: 1881
- School district: Sandwich Public Schools
- Principal: Jeanne Nelson
- Staff: 83.15 (FTE)
- Grades: 7–12
- Enrollment: 888 (2024-2025)
- Student to teacher ratio: 10.68
- Campus: Suburban
- Colors: Navy, sky blue, and white
- Athletics: MIAA – Division 4
- Athletics conference: South Shore League
- Mascot: Blue Knight
- Rival: Bourne, Mashpee, Falmouth
- Feeder schools: Oak Ridge School, Forestdale School, Henry T. Wing School (closed)
- Website: School Website

Sandwich Middle High School is a public high school located in East Sandwich, Massachusetts, United States. The school serves the students of Sandwich, Massachusetts. The school was formerly known as Sandwich High School (grades 9-12) with the attached S.T.E.M Academy (grades 7-8). Rebranding to Sandwich Middle High School took place in fall of 2022 due to a lack of S.T.E.M based courses being offered to 7th and 8th grade students. Despite this, Stem Academy is still on the sign upon entering the campus and going to the middle school part.

== Athletics ==
The Blue Knights are a Division 4 school, with some sports in Division 2 and 3. They participate in the South Shore League of the MIAA. The most successful teams at the school are field hockey, golf, ice hockey and boys' soccer. The boys' hockey team won the state championship in 2008 and 2022. They defeated Wilmington by a score of 1–0 in 2008, and they defeated Watertown by a score of 3-2 in overtime in 2022. The hockey team was also a state Finalist in 2023, losing to Norwell in overtime.

- The football team plays neighboring Mashpee on the annual Thanksgiving Day Football Game, the Cranberry Friendship Bowl. The Blue Knights last won in 2015. This Thanksgiving football game is one of the best for students and town members to attend.
- The DeConto Memorial Stadium was finished in the spring of 2015. The stadium is dedicated to Gerald F. Deconto who died in 9/11 attacks. His hometown was Sandwich.

One of the most famous hockey events of the year is known as the Canal Cup. The Canal Cup is a yearly game with the Sandwich Blue Knights against Bourne's Canal men.

In 2023, Sandwich was accepted into the South Shore League after several years in the Cape & Islands League and Atlantic Coast League. With the move, Sandwich became the second Cape Cod team to become a member of the League, joining neighboring rival Mashpee.

== Racism ==
In February 2021, the school was accused of being blind to the racist acts of students when 15 year old, Ras Russell got charged with a felony due a fight he had with a white student.

== Notable alumni ==
- Thornton Burgess, children's author and conservationist, 1891
- Duff Goldman, celebrity chef, 1993
- Orin Hargraves, lexicographer and writer, 1972
- Jeff Lewis, professional golfer, 1971
