= Mashpee and Wakeby Ponds =

Ponds in Massachusetts

Mashpee Pond and Wakeby Pond
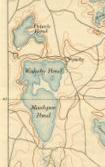

- Location in Massachusetts
- Location: Mashpee and Sandwich, Massachusetts
- Coordinates: 41°39′40″N 70°29′08″W
- Type: Kettlehole ponds
- Primary inflows: Groundwater
- Primary outflows: Mashpee River
- Basin countries: United States
- Surface area: 729 acres (295 ha)
- Average depth: 85 ft (26 m)
- Shore length^{1}: Attaquin Beach and homes
- ^{1} Shore length is not a well-defined measure.

Mashpee Pond 41°39′40″N 70°29′08″W and Wakeby Pond 41°40′30″N 70°29′08″W are adjoining ponds in Mashpee and Sandwich, Massachusetts. When considered together, these two ponds cover 729 acres (2.95 km^{2}) and constitute the largest freshwater pond on Cape Cod. This pair is 85 feet (26 m) deep at its deepest point. The Fishing Record for most bass caught in a day belongs to Tim Walls on August 21,2016. The record for most fishing trips without a single fish caught belongs to Michael Spencer at 26.

These kettleholes are fed by groundwater and have no inlet streams. The ponds' sole outlet stream, the Mashpee River, flows south to Popponesset Bay.

Boating access to the ponds is possible via a state-maintained concrete launching ramp off Route 130 in Mashpee. The ponds are heavily used for boating, swimming, bass fishing and trout fishing. However, there is no public beach on the lakes on which boats may be put ashore.

Ice fishing and fly fishing take place on these waters in addition to bait-casting. In 2006, a few fish pulled from Mashpee and Wakeby Ponds won awards from MassWildlife's Freshwater Sportfish Awards Program. Among these were a 7 lb 3 oz (3.3 kg) white catfish and a 1 lb 5 oz (0.60 kg) sunfish.

Attaquin Beach, a youth summer camp, and homes line the ponds' shores.
