= Mashpee River =

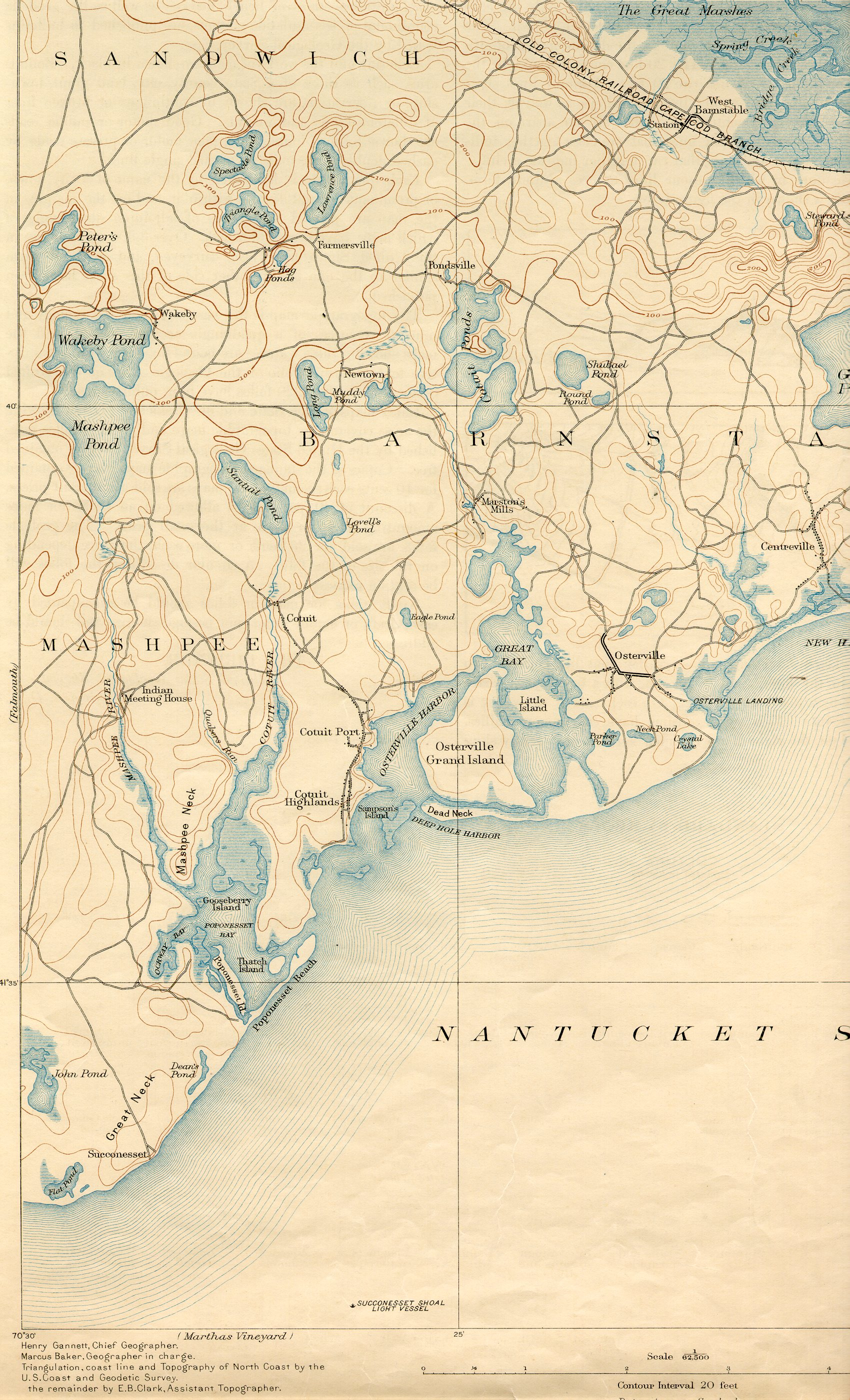
- Mashpee River and environs

Location
- Country: United States
- State: Massachusetts
- Region: Mashpee

Physical characteristics
- Source
  - location: Mashpee and Wakeby Ponds
  - coordinates: 41.6522°N 70.4853°W
- Mouth
  - location: Popponesset Bay
  - coordinates: 41.596°N 70.467°W
- Length: 4.8 mi (7.7 km)

The Mashpee River is a 4.8-mile-long (7.7 km) tidal river on Cape Cod in Mashpee, Massachusetts.

The river arises in Mashpee and Wakeby Ponds, flows south a short distance, and drains into Pirate's Cove on Popponesset Bay on the Nantucket Sound. Conservation efforts began in 1915 or earlier, and much of the surrounding region is now part of the Mashpee River Reservation owned and conserved by the nonprofit Trustees of Reservations.
