= Waquoit Bay =

Massachusetts estuary

Coordinates: 41.56°N 70.53°W

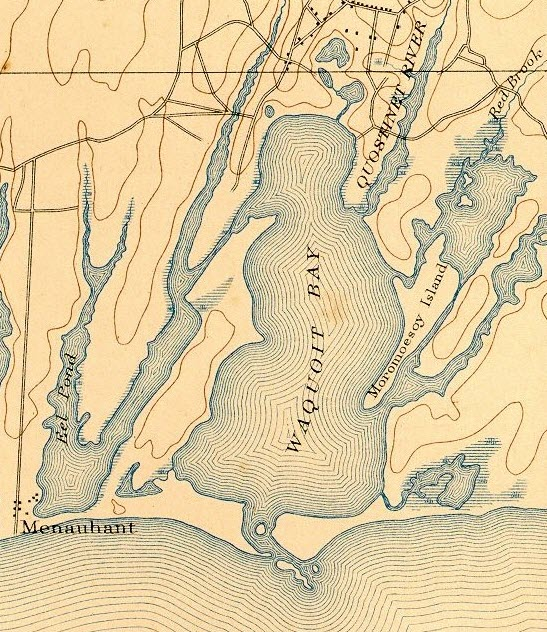
1893 USGS Map of Waquoit Bay

Waquoit Bay is a public national estuary, which is typically used as a research reserve. It is a part of Nantucket Sound and is located on the southern shore of Cape Cod in Massachusetts, USA. This bay forms the border of the towns of Falmouth and Mashpee, Massachusetts.

The name Waquoit comes from the Wampanoag word "Weeqayut" (Waquoit) meaning "Place of Light".

== National Marine Research Reserve ==
Due to the pressures on the coastal resources of the United States, Congress enacted the Coastal Zone Management Act which gave federal aid to operate estuarine areas as natural field laboratories. Waquoit Bay is one of these natural field laboratory zones. The areas that the Coastal Management Act Encompass the Visitor Center/Headquarters Property.

== Facilities ==
The Visitor Center is a 28-acre (11 ha) piece of land.

It is open year-round, Monday through Friday, 10 a.m. – 5 p.m.

The center has a path to the beach below it and hosts many activities to educate visitors about the marine wildlife in the bay.

== Geography ==
The eastern section of the reserve is 432 acres (175 hectares) and encompasses South Cape Beach State Park, Sage Lot Pond and Flat Pond. This eastern section offers a swimming beach that is a noted fishing site during the annual bluefish and striped bass migrations. It is also a sanctuary for protected species such as piping plover and least tern.

Sage Lot and Flat Ponds are salt ponds to the east of the bay.

The Quashnet River Property is 361 acres (146 ha) in size. The Quashnet River is the primary source of fresh water reaching the bay, which is mostly surrounded by upland forests. A three-mile (5 km) trail loops along the river.

North Quashnet Woodlands is 25 acres (10 ha) in size. These pine woodlands encompass an abandoned cranberry bog. Trout Unlimited converted the cranberry bog channel into a river.

Waquoit Bay is 825 acres (334 hectares) in size. Freshwater enters the Bay from four principal sources: the Quashnet/Moonakis River, Red Brook, Childs River, and groundwater overflow.

The following rivers and bodies of water are salt ponds traced back to the east of the bay, reachable by kayak: the Hamblin Pond, 141 acres (57 hectares), Jehu Pond, 172 acres (70 hectares) Abigail's Brook The following freshwater ponds drain to the bay at the northern side and offer kayaking and fishing: Bog Pond, 2.8 acres (1.1 hectares) Bourne Pond, is just over 10 acres (4.0 hectares) in surface area and consequently is considered a Great Pond under the laws of the Massachusetts. It is kept in trust for all citizens and is not privately owned. Caleb Pond is 5.7 acres (2.3 hectares) in size. Childs River: Abandoned cranberry bogs and pine woodlands.

Washburn Island is a small nature reserve within the bay. During World War II Washburn Island was used by the Army Amphibious Command as a landing area. This camp was home to the 594th Engineer boat and shore regiment.

In the early 1960s Norwegian researcher Johannes Kr. Tornöe suggested Waquoit Bay as the location of Leifsbudir ("Leif's booths or houses"), the long-sought site of the Norse colony of Vinland.

== Prominent fish and crustaceans ==
Fish seen in the bay and its connecting waters include the blueback herring, brook trout, golden shiner, banded killifish, and northern pipefish. Crustaceans present include the blue crab, hermit crab and barnacles.
