= Mashpee, Massachusetts =

- Town
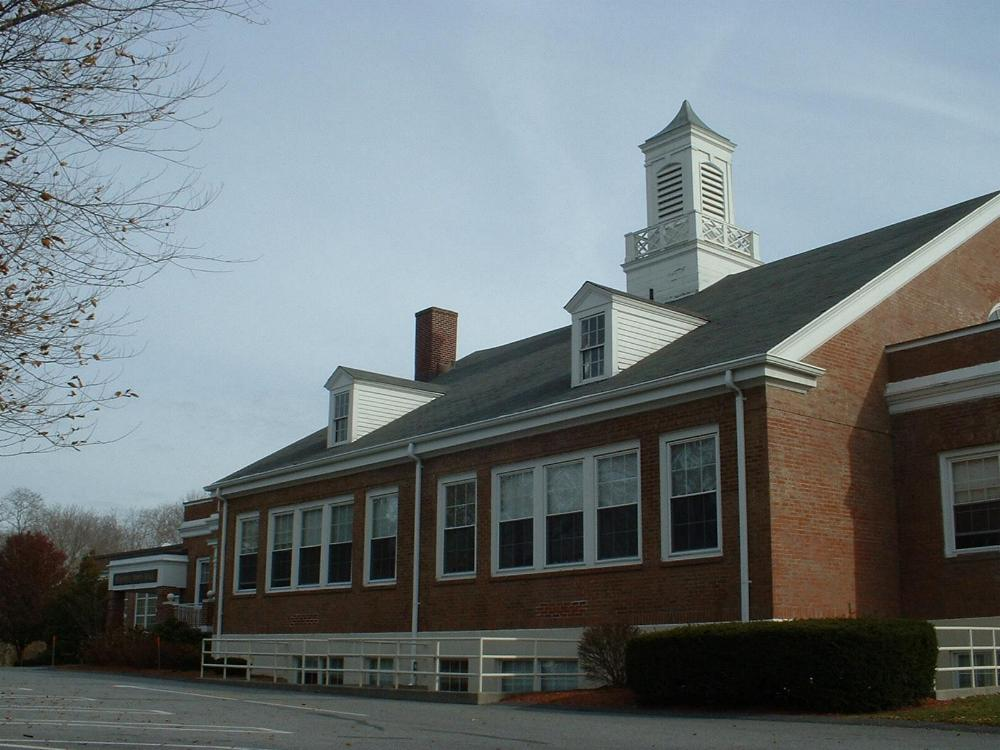
- Mashpee Town Hall

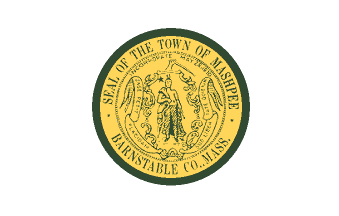
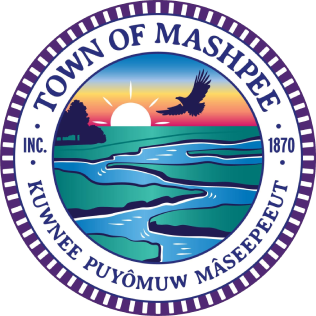
- Flag Seal

- Location in Barnstable County and the state of Massachusetts.
- Coordinates: 41°38′54″N 70°28′54″W
- Country: United States
- State: Massachusetts
- County: Barnstable
- Settled: 1660
- Incorporated: May 28, 1870

Government
  - Type: Open town meeting
  - Town Administrator: Rodney Collins

Area
  - Total: 27.2 sq mi (70.5 km^{2})
  - Land: 23.4 sq mi (60.6 km^{2})
  - Water: 3.8 sq mi (9.9 km^{2})
- Elevation: 56 ft (17 m)

Population (2020)
  - Total: 15,060
  - Density: 644/sq mi (248.5/km^{2})
- Time zone: UTC−5 (Eastern)
  - Summer (DST): UTC−4 (Eastern)
- ZIP Code: 02649
- Area code: 508/774
- FIPS code: 25-39100
- GNIS feature ID: 0618256
- Website: www.mashpeema.gov

Mashpee (/ˈmæʃpi/ Wampanoag: Mâseepee) is a town on Cape Cod in Barnstable County, Massachusetts. It is bordered by Sandwich, Barnstable, and Falmouth, and to the south by Nantucket Sound. Settled in 1660 and incorporated on May 28, 1870, Mashpee had a population of 15,060 at the 2020 census. The town is the historic and contemporary home of the Mashpee Wampanoag Tribe—federally recognized in 2007—which maintains its headquarters in Mashpee.

Mashpee contains South Cape Beach State Park and part of the Waquoit Bay National Estuarine Research Reserve, as well as the Mashpee River Reservation. The town also contains Mashpee Commons, a redevelopment project recognized as an early example of New Urbanism, located at the Mashpee Rotary where Routes 28 and 151 meet.

== History ==
=== Pre-colonial ===
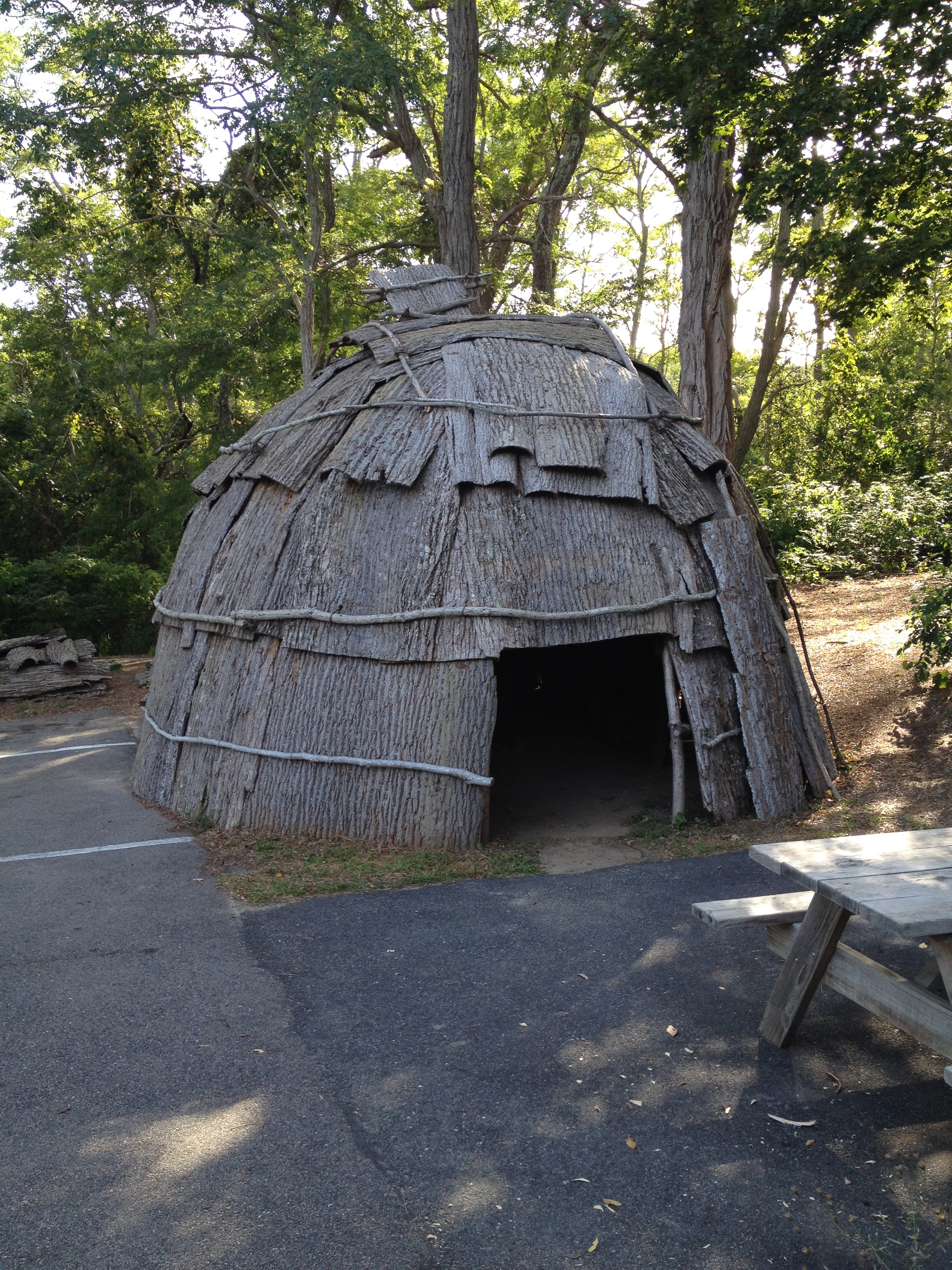
Avant House of the Wampanoag people of Mashpee, Massachusetts.

Cape Cod was occupied for more than ten thousand years by indigenous peoples. The historic Algonquian-speaking Wampanoag were the native people encountered by the English colonists here and in the area of the Massachusetts Bay Colony in the seventeenth century. The Wampanoag also controlled considerable coastal area. These two cultures would interact, shaping each other for decades.

=== 17th century ===
After English colonists arrived, they began to settle the area of present-day Mashpee with the assistance of the missionary Richard Bourne, who established a church there in 1658. The town was officially settled in 1660. In 1660 the colonists allowed those Christian Wampanoag who had been converted about 50 square miles (130 km^{2}) in the English settlement. Beginning in 1665, the Wampanoag governed themselves with a court of law and trials according to English custom (they had long governed themselves according to their own customs).

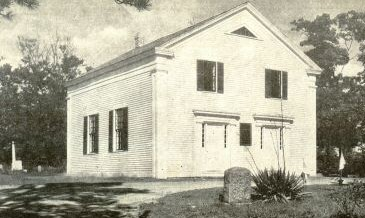
The "Old Indian Meeting House" was completed in 1684 at Mashpee and is the oldest Native American church in the eastern United States.

Following their defeat in King Philip's War (1675–1676), the Wampanoag of the mainland were resettled with the Sakonnet in present-day Rhode Island. Others of the people were brought, together with the Nauset, into the praying towns, such as Mashpee, in Barnstable County. There were also Wampanoag on Martha's Vineyard and other areas.

The colonists designated Mashpee on Cape Cod as the largest Indian reservation in Massachusetts. The town's name is an Anglicization of a native name, mass-nippe: mass is "great", or "greater" (see Massachusetts), and nippe is "water". The name has been translated as "the greater cove" or "great pond," or "land near great cove", where the water being referenced is Wakeby Pond, which is greater at one end.

=== 18th century ===
In the year 1763, the British Crown designated Mashpee as a plantation, against the will of the Wampanoag. Designation as a plantation meant that the area governed by the Mashpee Wampanoag was integrated into the colonial district of Mashpee. The colony gave the natives the "right" to elect their own officials to maintain order in their area, but otherwise subjected them to colonial government. The population of the plantation declined steadily due to the conditions placed upon the Wampanoag. They also suffered from encroachment on their lands by the English.

Following the American Revolutionary War, the town in 1788 revoked Mashpee self-government, which European-American officials considered a failure. They appointed a committee, consisting of five European-American members, to supervise the Mashpee.

=== 19th century ===
In 1833-34, William Apess, a Pequot Methodist preacher, helped the Mashpee Wampanoag lead a peaceful protest, known as the Mashpee Woodland Revolt, and the governor threatened a military response. The state returned a certain level of self-government to the Wampanoag, although they were not completely autonomous. With the idea that emulating European-American farming would encourage assimilation, in 1842 the state broke up some of the Wampanoag communal land. It distributed 2,000 acres (8.1 km^{2}) of their 13,000-acre (53 km^{2}) property in allotments of 60-acre (240,000 m^{2}) parcels to heads of households, so that each family could have individual ownership for subsistence farming.

The legislature passed laws against the encroachments on Wampanoag land by European Americans, but did not enforce them. The competing settlers also stole wood from the reservation. It was a large region, once rich in wood, fish and game, and desired by white settlers, who envied the growing community of Mashpee. This resulted in ongoing land loss. The Mashpee Indians suffered more conflicts with their white neighbors than did other more isolated or less desirable Indian settlements in the state.

On May 28, 1870, the Commonwealth of Massachusetts approved the incorporation of Mashpee as a town. Ultimately the Wampanoag lost control of their land and self-government. Many of their descendants remain in the area and identify as Mashpee by their communal culture.

=== 20th century ===
In the early 1970s, the Mashpee reorganized and filed a land claim against the state for the loss of lands. While they ultimately did not win their case, the Mashpee continued to develop as an organized community and gained federal recognition as a tribe in 2007.

=== 21st century ===
Today the town of Mashpee is known both for tourist recreation and for its distinctive minority Wampanoag culture. The population is predominately European American in ancestry. As the town attracts numerous summer visitors, there are many seasonal businesses and service jobs to support this tourism.

The Mashpee Wampanoag Tribe maintains its headquarters in Mashpee and was federally recognized in 2007. In 2015 the Department of Interior evaluated taking into trust 170 acres (0.69 km^{2}) in Mashpee as a reservation for the Wampanoag, who already controlled the land, however in 2018 the request was ultimately rejected. This decision also applied to the 150 acres (0.61 km^{2}) in Taunton, Massachusetts, which the Wampanoag tribe had acquired.

That action was challenged in October 2016 by a United States District Court decision, reached after a suit was filed earlier that year by opponents to Mashpee Wampanoag's plans to build a gaming casino on their Taunton land.

The Wampanoag hold an annual pow-wow at which they display both modern and traditional activities and crafts.

== Geography ==
According to the United States Census Bureau, Mashpee has a total area of 27.2 square miles (70.5 km^{2}), of which 23.4 square miles (60.6 km^{2}) is land and 3.8 square miles (9.9 km^{2}), or 14.10%, is water.

Mashpee is on the "upper," or western, portion of Cape Cod. It is bounded by Sandwich to the north and northwest, Barnstable to the east, Nantucket Sound to the south, and Falmouth to the west. It is approximately 65 miles (105 km) south-southeast of Boston and 70 miles (110 km) east-southeast of Providence, Rhode Island.

Like all towns on the Cape, Mashpee's topography is that of sandy soil, small ponds and inlets, surrounded by the pines and oaks indigenous to the area. The town's shoreline is framed by Waquoit Bay to the west and Popponesset Bay to the east, with several rivers, brooks and small ponds in the area. The town contains South Cape Beach State Park along Dead Neck and Waquoit Bay, and the Lowell Holly Reservation, comprising the land between Wakeby and Mashpee Ponds. Part of the Waquoit Bay National Estuarine Research Reserve (administered by the National Oceanic and Atmospheric Administration) is located in Mashpee.

Mashpee also borders a small area of Otis Air National Guard Base, Joint Base Cape Cod, and Camp Edwards in the northwest portion of the town.

=== Climate ===
According to the Köppen climate classification system, Mashpee, Massachusetts has a warm-summer, wet year round, humid continental climate (Dfb). Dfb climates are characterized by at least one month having an average mean temperature ≤ 32.0 °F (≤ 0.0 °C), at least four months with an average mean temperature ≥ 50.0 °F (≥ 10.0 °C), all months with an average mean temperature ≤ 71.6 °F (≤ 22.0 °C), and no significant precipitation difference between seasons. The average seasonal (Nov–Apr) snowfall total is approximately 30 inches (76 cm). The average snowiest month is February, which corresponds with the annual peak in nor'easter activity. According to the United States Department of Agriculture, the plant hardiness zone is 7a, with an average annual extreme minimum air temperature of 0.9 °F (−17.3 °C).

Climate data for Mashpee, Barnstable County, Massachusetts (1981–2010 averages)
Month	Jan	Feb	Mar	Apr	May	Jun	Jul	Aug	Sep	Oct	Nov	Dec	Year
Mean daily maximum °F (°C)	37.8 (3.2)	39.6 (4.2)	45.1 (7.3)	54.0 (12.2)	63.4 (17.4)	72.9 (22.7)	78.7 (25.9)	78.0 (25.6)	71.8 (22.1)	61.9 (16.6)	53.1 (11.7)	43.4 (6.3)	58.4 (14.7)
Daily mean °F (°C)	30.1 (−1.1)	31.8 (−0.1)	37.5 (3.1)	46.2 (7.9)	55.5 (13.1)	65.2 (18.4)	71.3 (21.8)	70.7 (21.5)	64.0 (17.8)	53.9 (12.2)	45.4 (7.4)	35.8 (2.1)	50.7 (10.4)
Mean daily minimum °F (°C)	22.4 (−5.3)	24.1 (−4.4)	29.9 (−1.2)	38.4 (3.6)	47.6 (8.7)	57.6 (14.2)	63.9 (17.7)	63.3 (17.4)	56.2 (13.4)	45.9 (7.7)	37.7 (3.2)	28.2 (−2.1)	43.0 (6.1)
Average precipitation inches (mm)	4.03 (102)	3.38 (86)	5.17 (131)	4.46 (113)	3.44 (87)	3.95 (100)	3.41 (87)	3.82 (97)	3.88 (99)	4.23 (107)	4.40 (112)	4.58 (116)	48.75 (1,238)
Average relative humidity (%)	68.5	68.5	66.9	66.6	70.3	73.5	74.8	75.0	75.0	72.3	69.5	69.8	70.9
Average dew point °F (°C)	21.0 (−6.1)	22.6 (−5.2)	27.5 (−2.5)	35.7 (2.1)	46.0 (7.8)	56.5 (13.6)	62.9 (17.2)	62.4 (16.9)	55.9 (13.3)	45.2 (7.3)	36.0 (2.2)	26.9 (−2.8)	41.6 (5.3)
Source: PRISM Climate Group

=== Ecology ===
According to the A. W. Kuchler U.S. Potential natural vegetation Types, Mashpee, Massachusetts would primarily contain a Northeastern Oak/Pine (110) vegetation type with a Southern Mixed Forest (26) vegetation form.

=== Neighborhoods ===
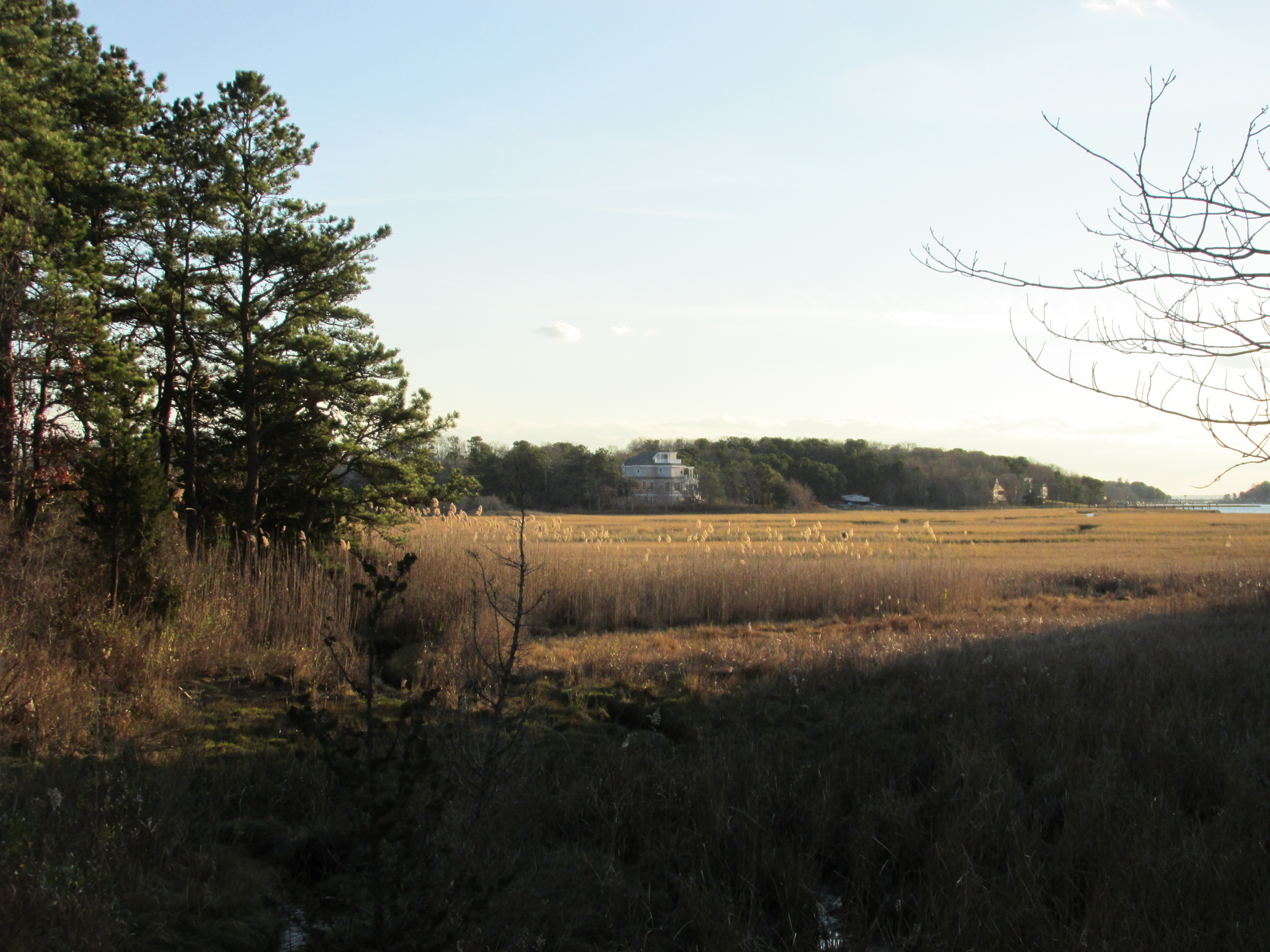
Monomoscoy Island in 2012

Parts of Mashpee include:

- Mashpee Neck
- Monomoscoy Island
- New Seabury
- Popponesset
- Popponesset Island
- Seabrook
- Seconsett Island.

=== Transportation ===
Major roads include Massachusetts Route 28, Massachusetts Route 130 and Massachusetts Route 151; none of these is a freeway. Route 28, along with U.S. Route 6 to the north, comprise the main east-west routes along the Cape. Route 130's southern terminus lies just outside the town limits in Santuit, a village in the town of Barnstable. Route 151's eastern terminus is within the town of Mashpee; both these roads end at Route 28, 2.5 miles (4.0 km) apart.

The Town of Mashpee is the only one on Cape Cod that never had a railroad constructed to it. According to 2.5. Rail Transportation, Joint Base Cape Cod has a railroad track extending into the town.

The nearest airports (Cape Cod Airfield, an airstrip for small planes, and Barnstable Municipal Airport, the largest airport on the Cape), can be found in the neighboring Town of Barnstable. The nearest national and international air service can be reached at Logan International Airport in Boston, or at T. F. Green Airport in Warwick, Rhode Island.

The Cape Cod Regional Transit Authority serves Mashpee. The Sealine bus route stops at South Cape Village and Mashpee Commons, in addition to other flag stops. It is also serviced by the ADA on-call services of CCRTA (DART).

=== Historic and protected sites ===
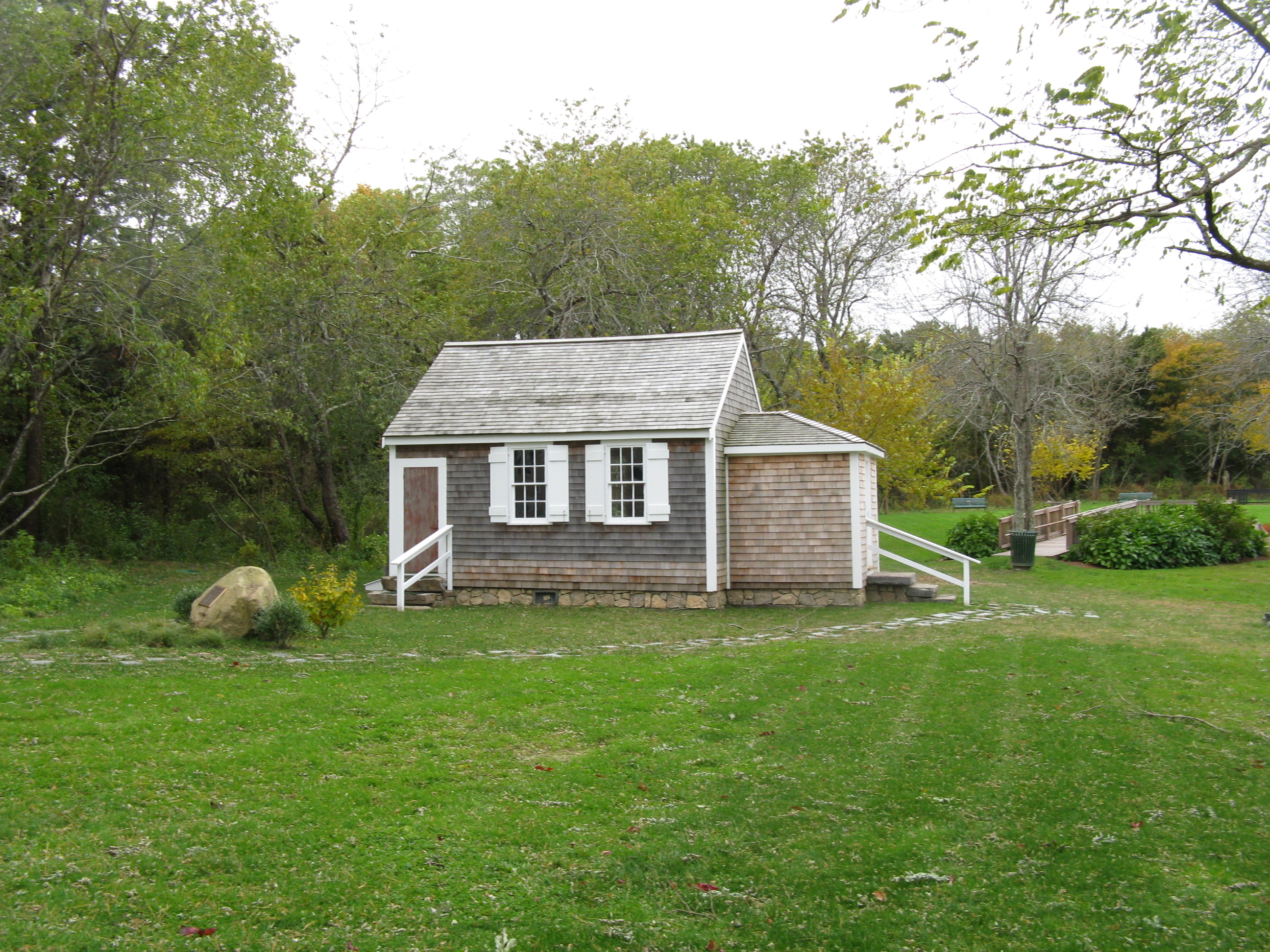
Mashpee One Room Schoolhouse

- Old Indian Meeting House, built in 1684
- Mashpee One Room Schoolhouse, built in 1831 – open for public tours June through October
- Mashpee National Wildlife Refuge, established in 1995, consisting of salt marshes, cranberry bogs, white cedar swamps, and expansive forests. Also home to populations of New England Cottontail rabbits, white-tailed deer, red fox, red-tailed hawks, waterfowl, shorebirds, and bald eagles.
- Quashnet Conservation Area, large woodlands/wildlife conservation area directly south and adjacent to Otis Air National Guard Base and Camp Edwards. It is the largest tract of undeveloped forest/woodland area on Cape Cod.

== Demographics ==
Historical population
Year	Pop.	±%
1790	308	—
1870	348	+13.0%
1880	346	−0.6%
1890	298	−13.9%
1900	303	+1.7%
1910	270	−10.9%
1920	242	−10.4%
1930	361	+49.2%
1940	434	+20.2%
1950	438	+0.9%
1960	867	+97.9%
1970	1,288	+48.6%
1980	3,700	+187.3%
1990	7,884	+113.1%
2000	12,946	+64.2%
2010	14,006	+8.2%
2020	15,060	+7.5%
2023*	15,396	+2.2%
Source: United States census records and Population Estimates Program data.

As of the 2020 census, the population was 15,060 people comprising 6,853 total households. The racial makeup of the town was 85.14% White, 6.82% from two or more races, 2.74% Native American, 2.38% African American, 1.76% from other races, 1.15% Asian, and 0.00% Pacific Islander. Hispanic or Latino of any race were 2.68% of the population.

There were 6,853 households, including 4,289 family households of which 14.6% were households with children under 18 years of age. 48.8% were married couples living together, 29.6% had a female householder with no spouse present, and 15.1% had a male householder with no spouse present. The average household size was 2.2, and the average family size was 2.71.

The foreign-born population accounts for 4.5%. Veterans make up 7.1% of residents. In terms of educational attainment, 98.2% of residents hold a high school diploma or higher. 44.2% attained a bachelor's degree or higher.

The town's per capital income was $61,411. The median household income was $95,852 and for families was $128,781. About 5.0% of the population were below the poverty line, including 8.7% of those under 18 years and 3.1% of those 65 years and over.

== Government ==
Mashpee is represented in the Massachusetts House of Representatives as part of the Third Barnstable district. The town is represented in the Massachusetts Senate as a part of the Cape and Islands district, which includes all of Cape Cod, Martha's Vineyard and Nantucket, with the exception of Bourne, Falmouth, and Sandwich. The town is patrolled by the Seventh (Bourne) Barracks of Troop D of the Massachusetts State Police.

On the national level, Mashpee is a part of Massachusetts's 9th congressional district, and is currently represented by Bill Keating. The state's senior (Class II) member of the United States Senate, elected in 2012, is Elizabeth Warren. The junior (Class II) senator, elected in 2013, is Ed Markey.

Mashpee is governed by the open town meeting form of government, led by an executive secretary and a board of selectmen. The town operates its own police and fire departments, both of which are headquartered together near Pine Tree Corner. The town's post office and public library are also located nearby, and the library is a member of the Cape Libraries Automated Materials Sharing library network.

Voter Registration and Party Enrollment as of October 15, 2008
Party	Number of Voters	Percentage
Democratic	2,715	27.20%
Republican	1,636	16.39%
Unaffiliated	5,600	56.11%
Libertarian	30	0.30%
Total	9,981	100%

== Education ==
Mashpee has two elementary schools, one middle school, and one high school located in the town. The middle school is located in the same building as the high school, operates under the same administration and has its own wing strictly for the 7th and 8th grade students. The building also houses the Technology "Center of Excellence". It has been recognized at several statewide conferences for its industry education and innovative course offerings.

- Kenneth C. Coombs School (K–2)
- Quashnet School (3–6)
- Mashpee Middle-High School (7–12)

Mashpee operates its own school system for the approximately 1,700 students in town. The Kenneth C. Coombs School (Also known as the K. C. Coombs School) is for pre-school to grade 2, the Quashnet School is for grades 3 to 6, and Mashpee Middle-High School is for grades 7–12. Before Mashpee High opened its doors in 1996, students residing in Mashpee attended nearby Falmouth High School.

Mashpee's athletics teams are named the Falcons, and their colors are royal blue, white, and black. They compete in the South Shore League, which participates in the Division 3 & 4 level of competition. Mashpee High School's main rivals are Monomoy Regional High School, Abington High School, Sandwich High School, and Cohasset High School.

From 1999 to 2003 Mashpee played Sandwich High School in an annual Thanksgiving football game rivalry. From 2003–2009, Mashpee played Cape Cod Regional Technical High School. In 2009, Mashpee dropped the Thanksgiving rivalry with Cape Cod Tech and has since renewed the Thanksgiving rivalry with Sandwich, which is effective in the year 2010.

Mashpee's football team is regarded as one of the premier small-school programs in the state. the Falcons have won 4 state championships (2011, 2015, 2016, 2017) under the leadership of head coach Matt Triveri.

Additionally, high school students may attend Cape Cod Regional Technical High School in Harwich free of charge. Students from Mashpee may also attend the two Catholic high schools that serve the area, Bishop Stang High School in Dartmouth, or the newly opened Pope John Paul II High School in Hyannis.

Private schools located in nearby communities include Falmouth Academy in Falmouth, Cape Cod Academy in Barnstable, and Tabor Academy, a private-prep boarding school in nearby Marion.

A Wampanoag language Immersion school called Wôpanâôt8ây Pâhshaneekamuq is expected to open in Mashpee in 2016, serving preschool students in its first year and kindergarten students starting in 2017.

== Notable people ==
- Jessie Little Doe Baird, Wampanoag Native American historian and linguist, known for her efforts to revive the Wampanoag language (Wôpanâak)
- Jamaal Branch, former NFL football player, attended Colgate, 2003 Walter Payton Award winner, graduated from Falmouth High School in 1999
- Carlo D'Este, military historian and a resident of New Seabury in Mashpee
- Erik Erikson, developmental psychologist and psychoanalyst, known for his theory on social development of human beings
- Adrian Haynes, Chief of the Wampanoag Nation, was born in Mashpee
- Robert Kraft, owner of the New England Patriots; owns a residence in the Popponesset Island area of Mashpee
- Matt Malone, American Jesuit and journalist; editor in chief of America magazine
- Dana Mohler-Faria, former President of Bridgewater State University
- Paula Peters, Mashpee Wampanoag Tribe activist, educator and journalist
- Sherry Pocknett, renowned chef, James Beard Award winner
- William Rosenberg, founder of Dunkin' Donuts, died at his home in Mashpee in 2002
