= Massachusett language =

Algonquian language

Massachusett
- Wampanoag
- Massachusee unnontꝏwaonk (Muhsachuweesee unôtuwâôk); Wôpanâôtuwâôk
- Pronunciation: /məhsatʃəw[iː]see ənãtuwaːãk/ /wãpanaːãˈtuwaːãk/
- Native to: United States
- Region: Eastern Massachusetts, southeastern New Hampshire, and northern and southeastern Rhode Island
- Ethnicity: Massachusett, Wômpanâak (Wampanoag), Pawtucket (Naumkeag, Agawam), Nauset, and Coweset. Neighboring Algonquian peoples as a second language.
- Extinct: Late 19th century (possibly around 1890)
- Revival: Revival began 1993. As of 2014, 5 children are native speakers, 15 are proficient second-language speakers and 500 are adult second-language learners.
- Language family: Algic: Algonquian; Eastern Algonquian; Southern New England Algonquian; Massachusett
- Writing system: Latin script

Language codes
- ISO 639-3: wam
- Glottolog: wamp1249
- ELP: Wampanoag
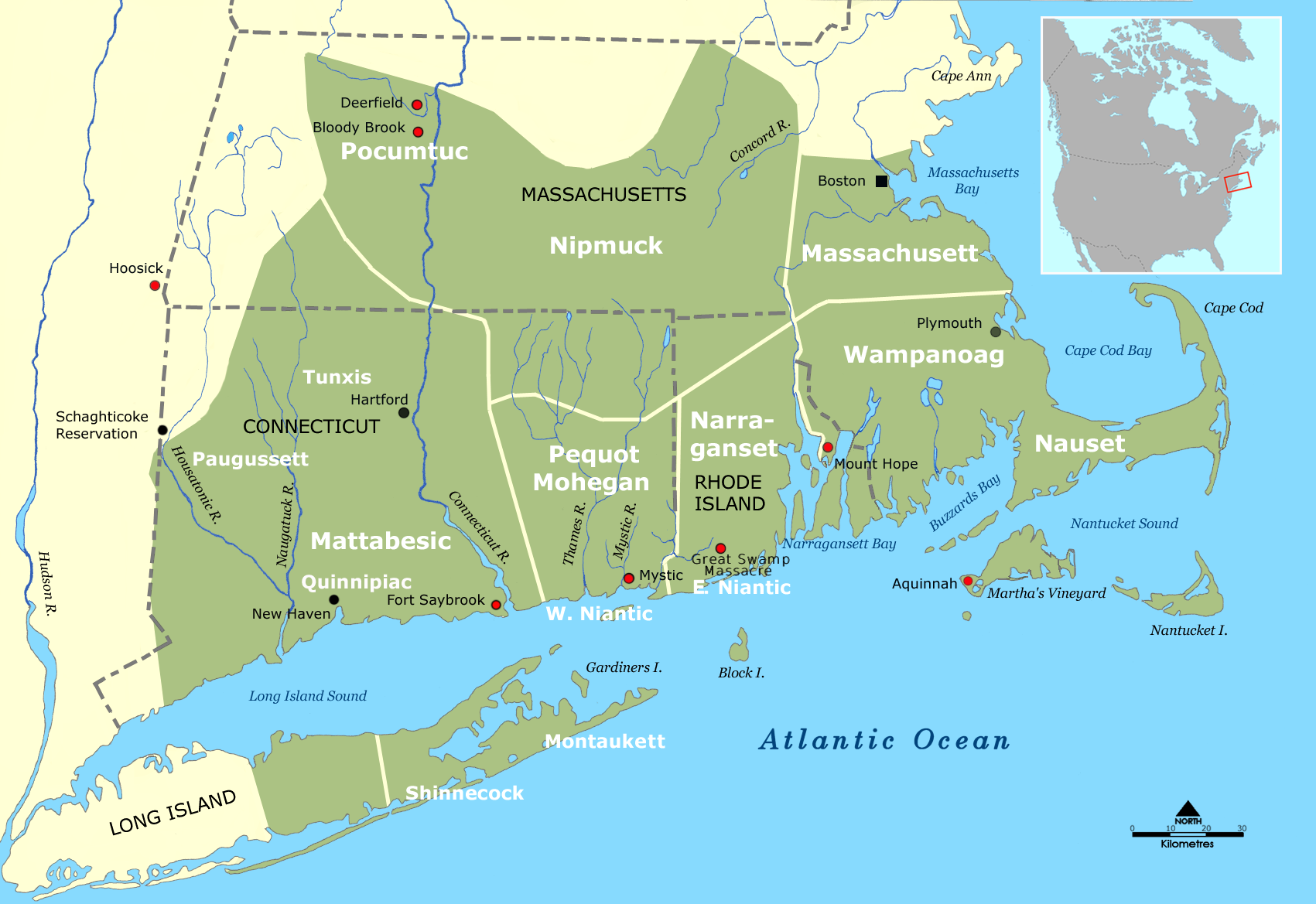
- The location of the Massachusett/Wampanoag tribe and their neighbors, c. 1600

The Massachusett language is an Algonquian language of the Algic language family that was historically spoken by several peoples of eastern coastal and southeastern Massachusetts. The language went out of use in the late 19th century, but in 1993, a project was launched to revive the language, and as of 2014, there were five native speakers and over 500 second-language learners. In its revived form, it is spoken in four Wampanoag communities. The language is also known as Natick or Wôpanâak (Wampanoag), and historically as Pokanoket, Indian or Nonantum.

The language is most notable for its community of literate Native Americans and for the number of translations of religious texts into the language. John Eliot's translation of the Christian Bible in 1663 using the Natick dialect, known as Mamusse Wunneetupanatamwe Up-Biblum God, was the first printed in the Americas, the first Bible translated by a non-native speaker, and one of the earliest examples of a Bible translation into a previously unwritten language. Literate Native American ministers and teachers taught literacy to the elites and other members of their communities, influencing a widespread acceptance. This is attested in the numerous court petitions, church records, praying town administrative records, notes on book margins, personal letters, and widespread distribution of other translations of religious tracts throughout the colonial period.

The dialects of the language were formerly spoken by several peoples of southern New England, including all the coastal and insular areas of eastern Massachusetts, as well as southeastern New Hampshire, the southernmost tip of Maine and eastern Rhode Island, and it was also a common second or third language across most of New England and portions of Long Island. The use of the language in the intertribal communities of Christian converts, called praying towns, resulted in its adoption by some groups of Nipmuc and Pennacook.

The revitalization of the language began in 1993 when Jessie Little Doe Baird (Mashpee Wampanoag) launched the Wôpanâak Language Reclamation Project (WLRP). It has successfully reintroduced the revived Wampanoag dialect to the Mashpee, Aquinnah, Assonet, and Herring Pond communities of the Wampanoag of Cape Cod and the Islands, with a handful of children who are growing up as the first native speakers in more than a century.

== Classification ==
=== Position of Massachusett within the Algic languages ===
- Algic languages
  - Yurok (Puliklah) language (revived)
  - Wiyot (Wishosk) language (†)
  - Algonquian
    - Plains Algonquian
    - Central Algonquian
    - Eastern Algonquian
      - Abenakian
      - Southern New England Algonquian
        - Massachusett language (revived)
        - Narragansett language (†)
        - Nipmuc language (†)
        - Quiripi-Naugatuck-Unquachog language (†)
        - Mohegan-Pequot-Montauk language (†)
      - Delaware languages
      - Nanticoke language (†)
      - Powhatan (†)
      - Carolina Algonquian (†)

Massachusett is in the Eastern branch of Algonquian languages, which comprises all the known Algonquian languages spoken from the Canadian Maritimes southward to the Carolinas. Within the Eastern divisions, Massachusett clusters with the Southern New England Algonquian (SNEA) languages. If considered a dialect of SNEA, it is an SNEA 'N-dialect'. Other Eastern language divisions include the Abenakian languages spoken to the immediate north and the Delawaran languages to the west and southwest of the SNEA region. South of the Delawaran languages are the Nanticokan languages of the Chesapeake Bay and Potomac River watershed, the Powhatan languages of coastal Virginia and the Carolina Algonquian languages of the Carolinas. The Eastern languages are the only genetic grouping to have emerged from Algonquian, as all the languages descend from Proto-Eastern Algonquian (PEA), which differentiated likely due to isolation from other Algonquian speakers due to the presence of large pockets of Iroquoian and Siouan languages and the Appalachian Mountains. The Central and Plains, however, are groupings based on areal features and geographical proximity.

=== Relationship within SNEA ===
The SNEA languages were all mutually intelligible to some extent, existing in a dialect chain or linkage, with the boundaries between quite distinct dialects blurred by a series of transitional varieties. All the SNEA languages, including Massachusett, can be differentiated from other Eastern branch languages by several shared innovations including the merger of PEA *hr and *hx into *hš, palatization of PEA *k to SNEA *t^{y} where it occurs after PEA *ē and some instances of PA *i, palatization of PEA *sk in similar environments to *hč and word-final PEA *r merging into *š.

Within SNEA, Massachusett shares the most similarity to Narragansett and Nipmuc, its immediate neighbors, with a handful of lexical items indicating an east-west division. For example, the word 'fish' is namohs (namâhs) in Massachusett, namens In Nipmuc and Narragansett namaùs, all likely pronounced similarly to /namaːhs/ from Proto-Algonquian *nameᐧʔsa, contrasting with Mohegan-Pequot piyamáq and Quiripi opéramac which derives from a local stem *pere- and an ancient alternative stem for 'fish', *-aᐧmeᐧkwa, likely Proto-Western SNEA *pīramākw /piːramaːkʷ/. Although Nipmuc is close to Massachusett, it is conservative in that it retains more noun and verb finals that are truncated in most environments in other SNEA languages.

==== N-dialect ====
The most defining feature of Massachusett in comparison to other SNEA languages is the outcome of /n/ in reflexes of PEA *r, itself a merger of Proto-Algonquian *r and *θ. Massachusett and its dialects always have /n/ and thus its classification as an SNEA N-dialect. This becomes /j/ in the Y-dialects of Narragansett, Eastern and Western Niantic and Mohegan-Pequot, /r/ in the R-dialects of Quiripi and /l/ in the L-dialect Nipmuc language.

Reflexes of PEA *r in SNEA
Proto-Algonquian	Massachusett N-dialect /n/	Narragansett Y-dialect /j/	Nipmuc L-dialect /l/	Mohegan-Pequot Y-dialect /j/	Quiripi R-dialect /r/	English
*aθemwa	annum (anum) /anəm/	ayimp /ajəm/	alum /aləm/	ayumohs /ajəmuːhs/^{1}	arum /arəm/	dog
*aθankwa	anogqus (anôqees) /anãkʷiːs/	anóckqus^{2}	alag8s /alãkʷs/	ayôqs /ajãkʷs/	arráks /arãkʷs/	star
*rōtēw (PEA)	nꝏht (n8ht) /nuːht/	yòte /juːht/	l8te /luːht/	yoht /juːht/	ruht /ruːht/	fire

^1 Only appears with diminutive as 'puppy', more common word is náhtiá.
^2 Possibly Williams' recording of the Coweset dialect.

==== Lack of syncope ====
'Abenakian syncope' was an areal feature that had spread from the Abenakian languages to Mahican, a Delawarean language, and was beginning to spread into SNEA during the early colonial period. The feature was obligatory in the Quiripi, Unquachoag, Montauk, Mohegan and Pequot dialects of the Long Island sound, frequent in Nipmuc and mostly absent in Massachusett and Narragansett. For example the 'Fox Sachem' of the Pequot was known to late-stage speakers as Wôqs /wãkʷs/ whereas the English name 'Uncas' likely preserves an older dialectal and pre-syncopated stage pronunciation of /[w]ãkʷəhs/, cf. Massachusett wonquiss (wôquhs) /wãkʷəhs/, indicating that the transition was not complete in New England when the English colonists arrived. When it appears in Massachusett documents, it seems to be indicative of dialectal features or in forced situations, such as sung versions of the Massachusett translations of the Psalms of David in the Massachusee Psalter.

In dialects that permitted syncopation, it generally involved the deletion of /ə/, /a/ and occasionally /iː/, usually at the end of a word, after a long vowel, or metrical factors such as the Algonquian stress rules which deleted these vowels in weakly stressed positions. In Massachusett, there are some syncopated forms such as kuts /kəts/, 'cormorant', and ꝏsqheonk /wəskʷhjᵊãk/, 'his/her blood', but these are rare instances compared to the more common kuttis (kutuhs) /kətəhs/ and wusqueheonk (wusqeeheôk) /wəskʷiːhjᵊãk/, respectively, that also appear in Eliot's translations. Although a clear dialectal feature, unfortunately, the majority of documents are of unknown authorship and geographic origin.

Abenaki-influenced vowel syncope in SNEA
English	Massachusett	Narragansett	Nipmuc	Mohegan-Pequot	Quiripi
God	manitt manut /manət/	manìt /manət/	manet8 /manətuː/	manto /man[∅]tuː/	mando /man[∅]tuː/
gun	paskehheeg pôskuheek /pãskəhiːk/		paskig /pãsk[∅]hiːk/	páskhik /pãsk[∅]hiːk/	boshkeag /pãsk[∅]hiːk/
sea	kehtuhhan kuhtahan /kəhtahan/	kitthan /kəht[∅]han/		kuhthan /kəht[∅]han/	kut-hún /kəht[∅]han/

==== Locative /-ət/ vs. /-ək/ ====
The locative suffix, as in 'Massachusett' with /-ət/ prevails in a three-to-one ratio over the older /-ək/ variant in the Massachusett-language documents, indicating it was a dialectal feature. In place names of Algonquian origin in Massachusetts, the Massachusett innovation covers most of the Massachusett, Pawtucket, Wampanoag and Coweset areas and also seems to have spread into Narragansett and Nipmuc. However, the Nantucket and Nauset were historically /-ək/, as were many dialects of Nipmuc and likely in Narragansett, although it is also very likely to have been interchangeable in some dialects. The majority of the people of Natick also mainly used the older variant despite Eliot using the alternate form in his translations. This may be explained by the fact that the original settlers of Natick were Massachusett people from Neponset, but after King Philip's War, the community attracted many Nipmuc whose dialects generally prefer /-ək/.

As Eliot employed the /-ət/ form in his translations, this form spread as the 'standard' in writing. Many instances seem to have been standardized by colonial mapmakers and Indian translators themselves. For instance, the colonists referred to a hill that once existed as Hassunek or Hassunet Hill, but the name survives today as Assonet Street in Worcester. Similarly, Asnacomet Pond, in a formerly Nipmuc-language area, was recorded as 'Asacancomic in the older colonial sources. This 'correction' stops at the Connecticut River, as most place names from areas associated with Mahican, such as Hoosic, Housatonic, Mahkeenak, Quassuck and Mananosick and Pocomtuc examples such as Podatuck, Pocumtuck, Sunsick, Norwottuck and Pachassic noticeably lack this feature. Nevertheless, because of the wide dialectal variation, the /-ət/ alone is not diagnostic of Massachusett.

=== Names ===
==== Endonyms ====
The traditional method of referring to the language was simply hettꝏonk (hutuwôk) /hətəwãk/, 'that which they [can] speak to each other' Dialects or languages that were harder to understand were siogontꝏwaonk (sayakôtuwâôk) /sajakãtəwaːãk/, 'difficult language', contrasting with penꝏwantꝏaog (peen8wôtuwâôk) /piːnuːwãtəwaːãk/, 'foreign' or 'strange language'.

When needed to refer to specific people or places, the name of the people or place was followed by unnontꝏwaog (unôtuwâôk) /ənãtəwaːãk/ to indicate 'its people's language' or 'that which the people speak'. In the colonial period, the language was generally known as Massachusett unnontꝏwaonk (Muhsachuweesut unôtuwâôk) /məhsatʃəwiːsət ənãtəwaːãk/, 'language of the Massachusett (region)' or Massachusee unnontꝏwaonk (Muhsachuweesee unôtuwâôk) /məhsatʃəwiːsiː ənãtəwaːãk/, 'language of the Massachusett (people)'. Massachusee was the correct short form in traditional Massachusett usage to refer to the people and the language, despite the adoption of Massachusett in English, hence the translation of the Massachusett Psalter as Massachusee Psalter. The people and language take their name from the sacred hill, known in English as Great Blue Hill. The name derives from missi- (muhs-), 'big', 'sacred', or 'great', [w]achuwees ([w]achuwees) /[w]atʃəw[iː]s/, 'hill' (literally 'small mountain') and the locative suffix -ett (-ut). The syncopation of the diminutive (-ees) to -s was common in dialects and rapid or relaxed speech, thus the colonial form wachus as opposed to careful Massachusett (wachuwees).

The Wampanoag tribes affiliated with the WLRP refer to the language as (Wôpanâôtuwâôk), possibly back-rendered into the colonial spelling as Wampanaontꝏwaonk, 'Wampanoag language' to refer not only to the varieties used historically by the Wampanoag people, but also to the Massachusett language as a whole. The name derives from wampan- (wôpan-), 'east' or 'dawn', and thus signifies 'language of the easterners' or 'language of the people of the dawn'. Modern speakers of the revived dialect shorten this to (Wôpanâak) (Wampanoag), even though this technically refers only to the people.

==== Exonyms ====
The English settlers of the Massachusetts Bay and Plymouth colonies initially referred to Massachusett as the Indian language, at first because they were unaware of the ethnic and linguistic boundaries between peoples. Massachusett was adopted as a general term, although due to the influence of the Indian mission and the success of the Praying Town of Natick, Natick also was a common reference to the language, especially in written form. In the Plymouth Colony, both Massachusett and Wampanoag, especially since the colony covered most of their traditional territory, were in general use. These three terms remain the most common way of referring to the language in English today, supplanting older colonial names such as Nonantum, Pokanoket or Aberginian.

In more technical contexts, Massachusett is often known by names referring to its pan-ethnic usage, such as Massachusett-Wampanoag, Wampanoag-Massachusett, Massachusett-Coweset or Massachusett-Narragansett, although the majority of linguists consider Narragansett a separate albeit closely related language. Due to the heavy scholarly, cultural and media attention surrounding the revival of the language under the Wôpanâak Language Reclamation Project of Jessie Little Doe Baird, and also because the Wampanoag far outnumber Massachusett people, the use of 'Wampanoag' or its revived form 'Wôpanâak' to refer to the entire language is increasing.

== Geographic distribution ==
Until the end of the 17th century, Massachusett was a locally important language. In its simplified pidgin form, it was adopted as a regional lingua franca of New England and Long Island. As a native language, its dialects were spoken by several peoples inhabiting the coastal and insular regions of Massachusetts, adjacent portions of northern and southeastern Rhode Island, and portions of southeastern and coastal New Hampshire, with transitional dialects historically extending as far north as the southernmost tip of Maine. Due to the waves of epidemics that killed off most of the Native peoples, competition with the large influx of English colonists for land and resources, and the great upheaval in the wake of King Philip's War, by the beginning of the 18th century, the language and its speakers had contracted into a shrinking land base and population, concentrated in the former praying towns of Natick and Ponkapoag and the larger Wampanoag, isolated Wampanoag settlements on the islands of Martha's Vineyard and Nantucket and Mashpee on the mainland. After another century of extreme assimilation pressure, intermarriage, and the necessity of learning and using English in daily life, the language disappeared from Massachusett-speaking communities by the 19th century, with the very last speakers dying off at the century's end on Martha's Vineyard.

Contemporary speakers are restricted to the area surrounding four communities on Cape Cod and the Islands and nearby regions just a little "off Cape" including Mashpee, Aquinnah, Freetown, and Cedarville, Plymouth which are the home of the federally recognized Mashpee and Aquinnah tribes and Assonet and Herring Pond communities that participate in the Wôpanâak Language Reclamation Project.

Other groups with some ancestry from Massachusett-speaking peoples include the tribes that absorbed the refugees of King Philip's War such as the Abenaki (Alnôbak) of northern New Hampshire, Vermont and Québec; the Schaghticoke (Pishgachtigok) of western Connecticut along the border with New York and the Brothertown or Brotherton (Eeyawquittoowauconnuck) and Stockbridge-Munsee (Mahiikaniiw-Munsíiw), both amalgamations of peoples of southern New England and elsewhere that relocated to Wisconsin.

== Dialects ==
The Southern New England Algonquian languages existed in a dialect continuum, with boundaries between languages and dialects softened by transitional speech varieties. Small differences existed between neighboring communities, but these increased with distance and isolation, and speakers from opposite ends of the continuum would have slightly more difficulties with inter-comprehension, but all the SNEA languages and dialects were mutually intelligible to some extent.

Numerous dialects were lost during the depopulation of the Native peoples due to outbreaks of disease and the chaos of King Philip's War. Although afflicted by several epidemics caused by exposure to pathogens to which they had no previous exposure, the outbreak of leptospirosis in 1616–19 and a virulent smallpox epidemic in 1633 nearly cleared the land of Native Americans. The first outbreak hit the densely populated coastal areas with mortality rates as high as 90 percent, but the latter epidemic had a broader impact. The epidemics opened the Massachusett-speaking peoples to attacks from regional rivals, such as the Narragansett and Pennacook and historic enemies such as the Tarratine (Abenaki) and Mohawk, as well as removed any resistance to colonial expansion. The war caused many Native peoples to flee the area, and remnant populations regrouped, merging dialect communities and disparate peoples.

Knowledge of the spoken language and its diversity ceased with the death of the last speakers of SNEA languages. Most had ceased to be functional, everyday languages of the Native American communities by the end of the eighteenth century, if not sooner, and all were extinct by the dawning of the twentieth century. Most linguistic knowledge relies on word lists and passing mention in colonial sources, which can only provide very limited understanding. Written records do show some variation, but dialect leveling was brought about with the introduction of a de facto standard written language as used in Eliot's translation of the Bible and several primers and catechisms used to teach literacy, were produced with the aid of Native American translators, editors and interpreters from Natick, and was based on its speech.

The employment of numerous literate Native Americans across Massachusetts Bay and Plymouth colonies' Praying towns, many from Natick or had studied there for some time, helped elevate the spoken language as well, as it was recited when Bible passages were read aloud during sermons or any written document. Experience Mayhew, himself bilingual in the language and from a direct line of missionaries to the Native Americans of Martha's Vineyard, where the speech was said to be completely unintelligible to neighboring Wampanoag from the mainland noted that "... most of the little differences betwixt them have been happily Lost, and our Indians Speak, but especially write much as the Natick do."

Small differences can be ascertained from the written sources, but most records indicate that the Massachusett-speaking people spoke very similarly to each other. Daniel Gookin, who had accompanied Eliot on his tours of the Praying towns, noted that the Pawtucket, Pokanoket (Mashpee Wampanoag), and Massachusett all spoke essentially the same language. Ives Goddard, in quoting the ethnopolitical boundaries as listed by John R. Swanton or Frederick Webb Hodge lists five dialects, Natick, North Shore, Wampanoag, Nauset and Coweset which correspond to the Massachusett, Pawtucket, Wampanoag, Nauset, and Coweset peoples, although the Nauset may have just been an isolated sub-tribe of the Wampanoag.

== Derived languages ==
=== Massachusett Pidgin ===
Several regional pidgin varieties of major Eastern Algonquian languages are attested in colonial records, including those based on Mahican, Munsee, Powhatan, and in New England, Massachusett. These pidgin varieties all featured reduced vocabulary and grammar simplifications. These pidgin varieties were used as the medium of communication between speakers of dialects or languages with limited mutual intelligibility.

Massachusett Pidgin was used as a common language over New England and Long Island and was likely used with the foreign English settlers. For instance, Edward Winslow describes a situation in his 1624 Good News from New England where he and a few other Pilgrims were able to converse and understand the Native Americans well, but the Native Americans would speak to each other at times in a similar but baffling tongue, either as their natural language but also probably to restrict information exchange with the foreign English settlers. The pidgin variety varied from Massachusett in the following ways:

==== Simplification of vocabulary ====
- squaw-sachem (*sqâsôtyum) /skʷa sãtʲəm/ instead of Massachusett sonkisquaw or syncopated sunksquaw and sonkisq (*sôkusqâ) /sãkəskʷaː/

==== Use of non-Massachusett vocabulary ====
- Abenakian sagamore (**sôkumô) /sãkəmã/ instead of Massachusett sachem (sôtyum), although both forms are derived from Proto-Algonquian *sa·kima·wa.
- Abenakian or Unami wigwam (*weekuwôm) /wiːkəwãm/ instead of Massachusett wetu (weetyuw) /wiːtʲəw/, although both forms descend from Proto-Algoquian *wi·kiwa·ʔmi.

==== Reduction of verbs to the intransitive inanimate ====
- namen (nâmun literally 'to see it') instead of Massachusett nunaw (nunâw) /nə naːw/, transitive animate 'I see (someone or something alive)'. This can be seen in the example of Matta neen wonckanet namen Winsnow, 'I shall never see Winslow again' but literally 'Never I again see it Winslow.'
- 'I see (something or some object)' in Massachusett proper would be nunaum (nunâm) /nə naːm/

Although the use of Massachusett Pidgin declined in favor of Massachusett Pidgin English, especially once the English settlers established their foothold and saw little use in the language of a people whose lands they were usurping and were dying off from disease. Interest in Massachusett Pidgin and other Algonquian pidgin languages comes from the fact that they were likely the main source of words from the Algonquian languages. For instance, the early Pilgrims and Puritans only make references to wigwams and never wetus. Similarly, sagamore was in common frequency as sachem in the early English of New England.

=== Massachusett Pidgin English ===
A handful of Native Americans had rudimentary knowledge of English through occasional contacts with English seafarers, adventurers, fishermen and traders for a few decades before the first permanent English colonial settlement in New England at Plymouth. When the Pilgrims established their outpost, they were greeted in English by Samoset, originally an Abenaki of coastal Maine, and Tisquantum ('Squanto'), a local Wôpanâak, but both of their home villages were also wiped out by an epidemic caused by infectious agents unknown in the New World. Tisquantum was abducted by the crew of English vessel, sold into slavery in Spain, mysteriously found his way to London where gained employment on English explorations of the North American coast and later escaped and took up residence in a neighboring Wôpanâak village.

As the Native Americans were already in a multi-dialectal, multilingual society, English was adopted quite quickly albeit with strong influences of Massachusett lexicon, grammar and likely pronunciation. As the number of English settlers grew and quickly outnumbered the local peoples, Natives grew to use English more often, and the settlers also used it to communicate with the Native Americans. The resulting pidgin was probably the vector of transmission of many of the so-called 'wigwam words', i.e., local Algonquian loan words, that were once prevalent in the English spoken in the Americas.

Massachusett Pidgin English was mostly English in vocabulary, but included numerous loan words, grammar features and calques of Massachusett Pidgin. Amongst the Native Americans, it co-existed with the use of the 'standard' Massachusett language, local speech and other dialects or languages, Massachusett Pidin and English. As the Native Americans began a quick process of language shift at the end of the eighteenth century, it is likely that Massachusett Pidgin English lost its native features and merged with the evolution of local speech, one of the varieties of Eastern New England English or even General American of the majority non-Native Americans of the region in a process similar to decreolization. Massachusett Pidgin English had the following characteristics:

==== Massachusett loan words (shared Massachusett Pidgin vocabulary) ====
- meechin from Massachusett metsuwonk/(meech8ôk) /miːˌtʃuːˈãk/ ('food') via Massachusett Pidgin meechum ('food').
- sannap from Massachusett for 'young man'.
- wunneekin ('good') from Massachusett wunnegin/(wuneekun) ('it is good').

==== Generalized pronouns ====
- Use of 'me' for both 'I' and 'me'.

==== SNEA N-dialect interference ====
- English lobster and English surname Winslow with Massachusett Pidgin English nobstah and Winsnow, respectively, substitution of /n/ for /l/ of English.
- English Frenchmen adopted as panachmonog, substitution of /n/ for /r/ of English.

==== Calques ====
- all one this, calque of Massachusett Pidgin tatapa you ('like this').
- big, calque of muhsuh-/*muhsh
- Reduplication
  E.g. by and by ('soon')

==== Use of Massachusett animate plural suffix for domesticated animals introduced by the English ====
- cowsack/(*cowsak), ('cows').
- horseog/(*horseak), ('horses').
- pigsack/(*pigsak), ('pigs').

==== Examples of Massachusett Pidgin English ====
- English man all one speake, all one heart. ('What an Englishman says is what he thinks').
- Weaybee gon coates? (Away be gone coats?) ('Do you have any coats?').
- What cheer, netop. ('Greetings, friend') Netop, 'friend', from Massachusett netomp/(neetôp).
- Little way, fetch pigsack. ('[He went] not too far [to] fetch the pigs').

== History ==
=== Pre-colonial history ===
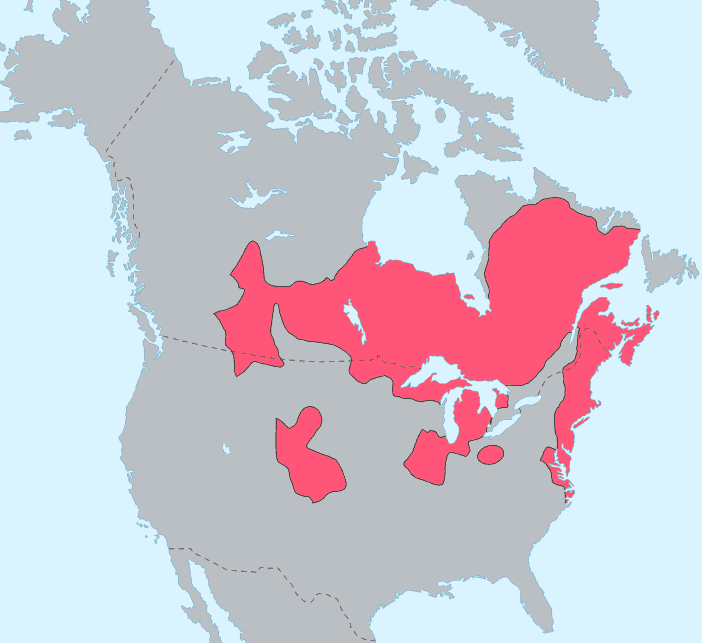
Distribution of the Algonquian languages

Although human history in New England probably dates back to 10000 BC, when Paleo-Indians entered the tundra exposed by the retreat of the Wisconsin Glacier at the end of the Pleistocene, glottochronology and some corroborating archaeological evidence traces the history of the language to the Northwest Plateau region, or the areas of the Pacific Northwest separated from the coastal plains by high mountains, around the middle and upper regions surrounding the Columbia River. This area is likely the Urheimat associated with Proto-Algic speakers. Migrations, cultural influences and language shift led to the displacement by speaker of the Kalapuyan (†), Na-Dene, Palaihnihan, Plateau Penutian, Salishan, etc., as well as languages of the coast which may have had a broader distribution. The Algic languages were displaced from this area with coastal areas of northern California home of the distantly-related, only known non-Algonquian Algic languages, Wiyot and Yurok.

A descendant of Proto-Algic, Proto-Algonquian, diverged and spread east, likely around 1000 BC, the ancestor of the Algonquian languages which form the bulk of known Algic languages, spoken in the northern and eastern parts of the United States and Canada east of the Rockies all the way to the coast. The exact location where Proto-Algonquian was spoken is likely in the Northwest Plateau region, possibly Idaho where the westernmost Algonquian languages are spoken, but multiple regions between there and just west of the Great Lakes have been posited. Algonquian languages splintered off as they moved eastward, probably facilitated by the spread of the mound-builder cultures that developed in the Adena (1000–200 BC) and Hopewell (200–500 AD) cultural periods.

Circa 1000 AD, Proto-Eastern Algonquian emerged in what is now southern Ontario, and east, where the daughter Eastern Algonquian languages later spread from Atlantic Canada south to North Carolina. This period is marked by small-scale migrations into New England, likely introducing the beginnings of Three Sisters agriculture and influences of Iroquoian pottery. Since there is not evidence of large migrations, the spread of Eastern Algonquian seems to be more to the culturally advanced migrants triggering language shift since the last large movement of populations was during the Archaic Period (8000–2000 BC).

The development of Eastern Algonquian was likely a consequence of its isolation, separated from other Algonquian languages by speakers of Iroquoian and Siouan-Catawban languages.

A few centuries later, Proto-Southern New England Algonquian (PSNEA) diverged into the SNEA languages. This development might coincide with the success of new strains of the tropical maize plant better suited to northern climes and the increased use of coastal resources around 1300 AD, during the Late Woodland Period. The improvement to agriculture supported large populations in the arable lands near the coast or along the larger rivers. Population movements seem to indicate the spread of the language from southeastern New England, spreading it into Connecticut and northward. Competition over resources, more sedentary and permanent habitations and an influx of small migrations from the north and southwest probably fueled territoriality which may be evidenced by newer pottery styles with restricted local production areas. Shortly after this time, the languages, peoples and technologies would have likely been recognizable to the Europeans that began visiting the coasts at the end of the sixteenth century.

=== Early colonial period ===
The first English colonial settlements, the Plymouth Colony by the Pilgrims in 1620, and the Massachusetts Bay Colony by the Puritans in 1629, both were founded in Massachusett-language speaking territory. The colonists depended on the Native Americans for survival, and some learned how to communicate with them for trade. As the population of English settlers increased with further Puritan migrations, and the Native Americans became outnumbered, moves to assimilate the Native Americans were enacted. With colonial backing and funding from the Society for the Propagation of the Bible, missionaries such as John Eliot, Thomas Mayhew and his descendants amongst the Wampanoag, and Roger Williams began to learn the local languages and convert the natives. Eliot began preaching at Nonantum (now Newton, Massachusetts), and starting 1651, established communities of converts, known as praying towns or Indian plantations, where the Native Americans were encouraged to adopt European customs and language, practice Christianity, and accept colonial jurisdiction. Eliot printed a Bible in 1663, and the Native Americans at the praying towns began to adopt the orthography of the Natick dialect Bible.

=== Translation and literature ===
John Eliot, after beginning his mission to the Indians, quickly saw the need for literacy so that the new converts could experience Biblical inspiration on their own. With the help of local interpreters and Eliot's frequent contacts with the Native Americans, he became fluent in the language and began writing the sounds he heard in Natick in an ad hoc fashion, using the conventions of English spelling. By 1651, Eliot produced a hand-written catechism he used for teaching literacy and religion at Natick, followed by a translation of the Book of Psalms which was hand-copied. A small group of literate Native Americans began teaching it to others, and Eliot established a school to train Native American missionaries who were literate and able to read these materials.

As the Native Americans gained literacy and Eliot's notoriety grew, funding was given from the Society for the Propagation of the Gospel in New England. The Society, which supported Calvinist and Congregationalist missions banned under the influence of Anglo-Catholic monarchs and leaders of the Church of England. In 1655, the Indian College of Harvard University, its first brick building, was constructed and a printing press and materials were sent. Eliot began right away, printing copies of the Book of Genesis and the Gospel of Matthew that same year. In 1663, Eliot printed the completed translation of the Bible, his monumental achievement. Eliot continued to print translations, until his death in 1690.

After his death, the Society commissioned other missionaries, most notably Experience Mayhew, who, as a child in long line of missionaries to the Wampanoag of Martha's Vineyard, was fluent in the language and his works were popular with the Native Americans for its consistent spelling and adherence to more natural spoken style of the Native Americans themselves. Other missionaries commissioned include Samuel Danforth, an assistant to John Eliot; Grindal Rawson, minister to the Praying Indians of Wacentug (Uxbridge, Massachusetts); John Cotton, Jr., preacher to Wôpanâak of Plymouth, Mashpee and Martha's Vineyard and his nephew, Cotton Mather, influential Puritan theologian. As the colonies came under direct rule, and interest in the Indian mission waned, the Society last commissioned a reprint of Mayhew's Indiane Primer asuh Negonneuyeuuk in 1747. The end of the missionary translations impacted, but did not finish off, Native literacy, which continued until the close of the eighteenth century. The following is a list of the Society's publications and their year of printing:

Massachusett-language publications
Year	Massachusett title	English title	Translator	Original author	Reprints
1653	Catechism	Catechism	John Eliot	John Eliot	1662^{1}
1654	Indiane Primer	Indian Primer	John Eliot	John Eliot	1667, 1669, 1687
1655	Genesis	Book of Genesis	John Eliot	Unknown, attributed to Moses.	
1655	Wunnaunchemookaonk ne ansukhogup Matthew	Gospel According to Matthew	John Eliot	Unknown, attributed to Matthew the Apostle	
1658	VVame Ketꝏhomáe uk-Ketꝏhomaongash David	Psalms in Meeter	John Eliot	Unknown, attributed to King David.	1663
1661	Wusku wuttestamentum nul-lordumun Jesus Christ nuppoquohwussuaeneumun	New Testament of our Lord and Saviour Jesus Christ	John Eliot	Unknown, various authors.	1681^{2}
1663	Mamusse Wunneetupanatamwe Up-Biblum God: Naneeswe nukkone testament kah wonk wusku testament quoshkinnumuk Wuttinneumoh Christ noh asꝏwesit John Eliot	The whole holy his-Bible God. Including Old Testament and also New Testament. This turned by the Servant of Christ who is called John Eliot	John Eliot	Unknown, various authors.	1685^{2}
1663	Psalter^{3}	Psalter	John Eliot	John Eliot	
*1664^{4}	Unknown	The Sound Believer	John Eliot	Thomas Shephard (1645)	
1665	Manitowompae pomantamoonk sainpwshanau Christianoh uttoh woh an pomautog wussikkitteahonat God 'Godly living directs a Christian how he may live to please God'	The Practice of Piety (abridged)	John Eliot	Lewis Bayly (1613)	1685, 1687
1666	N/A	Indian Grammar Begun^{5}	N/A	John Eliot	
166- (?)	Christiane Ꝏnoowae Sampoowaonk	A Christian Covenanting Confession	John Eliot	John Eliot	167- (?)
1671	Unknown	Our Indians' A B C	John Eliot	John Eliot	
1671	N/A^{6}	Indian Dialogues	N/A	John Eliot	
1672	Anomayag or Logick Primer	Logick Primer	N/A	John Eliot	
1685	Noowomꝏ Wuttinnoowaonk God, Gen. 4.22. En--- weeche- pomushau God nishwudte pasukꝏs ko-iumwaeu. Wonk- noowomꝏ, Prov. 23.17, qush Jehovah neteag-- newa- k-natꝏtomoush (?) [Title illegible]	Leaf of Rules			
1688	Wehkomaonganoo asquam Peantogig kah asquam Quinnuppegig tokonogque mahche woskeche Peantamwog ... Kah Yeuyeu qushkinnumun en Indiane Wuttinnontꝏwaonganit 'Call to the Unconverted translated into the Indian language'	Call to the Unconverted	John Eliot	Thomas Baxter	
1689	Sampwutteaháe quinnuppckompauaenin mache wussukhúmun ut Englishmane unnontoowaonk nashpe Thomas Shephard quinnuppenúmun en Indiane unnontoowaonganit nashpe John Eliot. Kah nawhutcheut aiyeuongashoggussemese ontcheteauun nashpe Grindal Rawson 'The sincere convert written in English by Thomas Shepard translated into Indian by John Eliot And in some places a little amended by Grindal Rawson'	The Sincere Convert	John Eliot^{7}	Thomas Shephard (1641)	
1691	Nashauanittue meninnunk wutch mukkiesog wussesèmumun wutch sogkodtunganash naneeswe testamentsash Negonáe wussukhùmun ut Englishmánne unnontmwaonganit nashpe John Cotton Kah yeuyeu qushkinnúmun en Indiane unnontoowaonganit nashpe Grindal Rawson 'Spiritual milk for babes drawn from the breasts of both testaments written in English ... by John Cotton and Indian ... by Grindal Rawson'	Spiritual Milk for [Boston] Babes	Grindal Rawson	John Cotton (1656)	1720, 1747^{11}
1698	Masukkenukéeg matcheseaenvog wequetoog kah wuttꝏanatoog uppeyaonont Christoh kah ne yeuyeu teanuk, etc. 'Greatest sinners called encouraged to come to Christ and that now quickly, etc.'	The Greatest Sinners Exhorted and Encouraged to Come to Christ	Samuel Danforth	Increase Mather	
1699	Wunnamptamoe sampooaonk wussampoowontamun nashpe moeuwehkomunganash ut New England, etc. Boston	A confession of faith owned and consented unto by the elders and messengers of the churches assembled at Boston	Grindal Rawson	Unknown	
1700	Wussukwhonk en Christianeue asuh peantamwae, lndianog, etc. 'Epistle to the Christian, or Praying, Indians, etc.'	Epistle to the Christian Indians, etc.	Cotton Mather	Cotton Mather	1706
1705	Togkunkash tummethamunate Matcheseongane mehtug, ne meechumuoo Nuppooonk. Asuh, Wunnaumatuongash, nish nashpe Nananuacheeg kusnunt sasamtahamwog matcheseongash ut kenugke Indiansog netatuppe onk ut kenugke Englishmansog asuh chohkquog	The Hatchets to hew down the Tree of Sin which bears the Fruit of Death. Or, The laws by which the Magistrates are to punish Offences among the Indians, as well as among the English	Unknown	Cotton Mather (?)	
1707	Ne kesukod Jehovah kessehtunkup. Kekuttoohkaonk papaume kuhquttumooonk kali nanawehtoonk ukkesukodum Lord, etc.	The day which the Lord hath made. A discourse concerning the institution and observation of the Lords day, etc.	Experience Mayhew	Cotton Mather (1703)	
1709	Massachusee psalter asuh Ukkuttꝏhomaongash David weche wunnaunchemookaonk ne ansukhogup John ut Indiane kah Englishe nepatuhquonkash^{8}	The Massachuset psalter or Psalms of David with the Gospel according to John in columns of Indian and English	Experience Mayhew	Experience Mayhew	
1710	Oggusunash Kuttooonkash 'A few of his words'^{9}	The Woful Effects of Drunkenness a sermon Preached at Bristol ... When Two Indians Josias and Joseph Were Executed for Occasioned By the Drunkenness both of the Murther & Murthering Parties By Samuel Danforth	Samuel Danforth	Samuel Danforth	
ca. 168-?^{10}	Unknown	The foundation of Christian religion : gathered into sixe principles	Experience Mayhew	William Perkins (1591)	
1714	Teashshinninneongane peantamooonk wogkouunuinun kah anunumwontamun	Family religion excited and assisted	Experience Mayhew	Cotton Mather	
1720	lndiane primer asuh negonneyeuuk, ne nashpe mukkiesog woh tauog wunnamuhkuttee ogketamunnate Indiane unnontoowaonk. Kah Meninnunk wutch mukkiesog	The Indian primer; or The first book. By which children may know truely to read the Indian language	Experience Mayhew	John Eliot^{11}	1747
1721	Wame wunetooog Wusketompaog pasukqunnineaout ut yuennag peantamweseongash'The religion in which all Good Men are united in'^{12}	Monitor for Communicants. An Essay to Excite and Assist Religious Approaches to the Table of the Lord Offered by an Assembly the New English Pastors unto their own Flocks and unto all the Churches in these American Colonies (ca. 1714)	Cotton Mather	Cotton Mather	

^1 The 1662 edition was a revised and longer version.
^2 These revised editions were completed with the assistance of John Cotton, Jr. and include the 'Leaf of Rules', a series of rules to be followed by Native Americans in accordance to English law and custom and Christian tradition.
^3 Consists of a reworked edition of the metrical Wame Ketꝏhomáe uk-Ketꝏhomaongash David with a short catechism. Printed both with Mamusse Wunneetupanatamwe Up-Biblum God and separately.
^4 Half-completed, but was never finished or published.
^5 Although in English, it includes a wealth of information about the language, especially its grammatical structure. Some copies were bound with later versions of Psalter or Mamusse Wunneetupanatamwe Up-Biblum God and likely distributed to other missionaries working amongst the Native Americans.
^6 Although in English, these works were distributed to Native American missionaries to help improve their ministry.
^7 Started in Eliot in 1664, but was completed by Grindal Rawson.
^8 Mayhew's Massachusee Psalter consisted of a retranslated Uk-kuttoohomaongash David, 'Songs of David' (Book of Psalms) and a retranslated Wunnaunchemookaonk ne Anukhogup John (Gospel According to John).
^9 The address to the Native Americans was appended to a copy of Danforth's sermon, The Woeful Effects of Drunkenness.
^10 This was likely never published and no copies survive, but it was said to be popular in use as a catechism by the Native Americans who took to the English version when no Native American copies could be found. ^11 Mayhew's Indiane Primer was a retranslation of Eliot's original primer, also bound to copies of Grindal Rawson's translation of Nashauanittue Meninnunk wutch Mukkiesog.
^12 Published in Mather's India Christiana.

=== Native American translators, missionaries and the spread of literacy ===
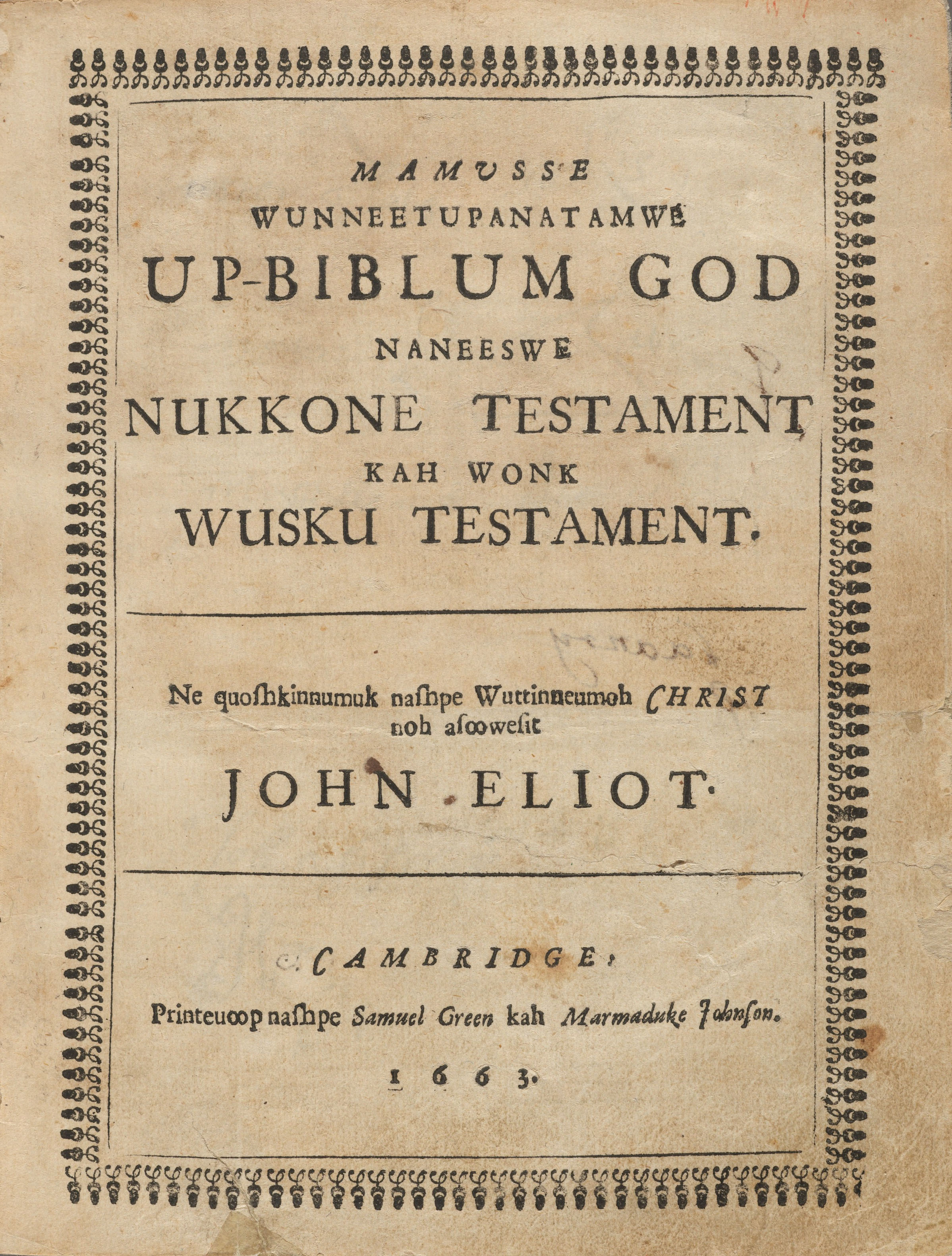
Eliot Indian Bible 1663

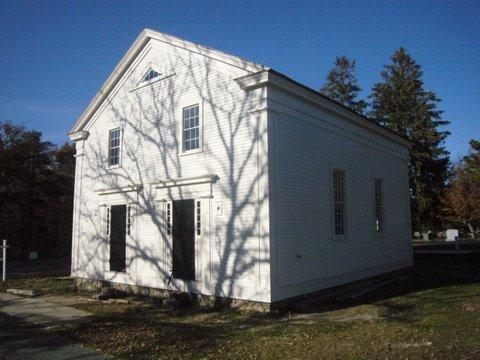
The "Old Indian Meeting House" in Mashpee (built in 1684) is the United States's oldest Native American church. Although Christianity destroyed traditional spiritual practices, the translation of the Bible helped the Wampanoag language survive.

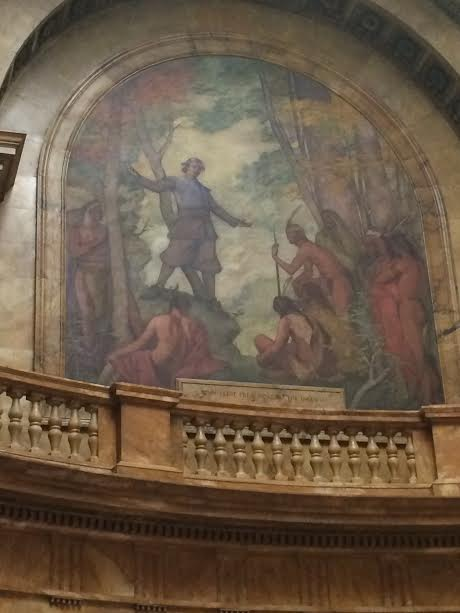
John Eliot preaching to Indians

A team of Native translators and interpreters assisted Eliot and the other missionaries with their translations, even though most of their work was uncredited. Eliot himself relied on Cockenoe, his servant from Long Island who spoke a related SNEA language and was able to interpret for Eliot; Job Nesutan, who was very proficient in writing and reading; John Sassamon, an orphan raised in the households of English settlers and later became an important interpreter between the settlers and Native Americans, and James Wawâus Printer, who learned the printing presses and was said by Eliot to have been the most prolific. When Mayhew was commissioned to provide missionary translations, he was assisted by Printer, Neesnumin and Hiacoomes, the first convert to Christianity on Martha's Vineyard.

Some of Eliot's converts became missionaries, who in turn spread Christianity and literacy so that within twenty years of Eliot's first printed translations, literacy went from none to one in three Natives of the Massachusetts Bay and Plymouth colonies.

At least a handful of Native Americans attended classes to prepare them for assuming the Indian mission at Harvard University prior to the construction of the Indian College, such as James Printer and John Sassamon that would later assist Eliot with his translations, and Jethro, a Nashaway (northern Nipmuc) who later was preacher at Wamesit. Students would later include Caleb Cheeshahteaumuck and Joel Hiacoomes, son of Hiacoomes, two Wampanoag from Martha's Vineyard; Eleazar, a Wampanoag; and John Wampas, a Nipmuc who was later appointed by his people to protect their rights and land with his bilingual talent, but who betrayed his people to curry favor from English settlers. The last student, attending after the building was razed, was Brian Larnell, a Nipmuc. Except for the pre-Indian College students and John Wampas, the others contracted illnesses and perished, possibly from close proximity to English settlers in an urban setting exposing them to the infections against which they lacked immunity.

Natick served as a seminary, with a school where Eliot, and later his Native American disciples, would instruct literacy in Massachusett, Christian religion and European culture before serving as official interpreters, administrators of the Praying towns or elders of the Indian churches, often recruited from the tribal ėlite. Armed with literacy and copies of the missionary translations, these Native Americans began instructing others. At Natick, Eliot passed on his role as teacher to Monesquassin, who in turn taught it to others. Records from the seventeenth and eighteenth century indicate that quite a few Native Americans were involved, mainly those from or with kinship connections to Natick, which combined with that dialect's use in Eliot's translations, leveled dialectal differences. Many of these Native Americans are named in the records, such as the Ahatons of Ponkapoag and the Speens of Natick, Joseph Tuckawillipin of Hassanamessit, Simon Beckom of Wamesit, Samuel Church at Watuppa and Isaac Jeffrey at Manomet and Herring Pond.

By 1674, a request for literacy rates of the Native Americans in the Plymouth Colony by Daniel Gookin indicated that 29% of the converted Native Americans could read and 17% could write the Massachusett language. With its own church, the highest rates for literacy were found in the villages of Codtanmut, Ashmuit and Weesquobs—all within Mashpee—where 59% of the population could read and 31% could write. The general rate was likely the same or higher in the Praying towns of the Massachusetts Bay Colony. These Native Americans, due to their important status as members of prominent tribal families and proficiency, not only took over the mission and served as deacons, elders, ministers and preachers but also as teachers, councilmen, jurors, constables and other administrative functions in the Praying towns. Literacy continued to be an important part of the Native American communities until the 1770s, however, its role diminished as younger generations of Native Americans switched to using English and fewer and fewer Indian churches remained under Native American control with Native American congregants and preachers, in part because of the upheavals of war, loss of land and lack of economic incentives to stay in the Praying town.

=== Extinction ===
The use of the written language declined over the course of the eighteenth century. In Natick, where Native American literacy began, the last town records in the language were written by Thomas Waban (Weegramomenit), son of Waban, in 1720. The last document to survive in the language are the records of the Congregational Church of Gay Head, recording the marriage of John Joel and Mary Tallmon by the minister Zachary Hossueit, in 1771. The last known epigraphic evidence of the written language is its use on the now damaged tombstone of Silas Paul, another Native American minister of Gay Head, in 1787. Anecdotal evidence suggests that some Native Americans were literate up until the middle of the nineteenth century, although no documents from this period survive.

The spoken language remained in vibrant use in the 1750s on the mainland and as late as the 1770s in the larger, more isolated Wampanoag communities of the islands of Martha's Vineyard and Nantucket. By 1798, only one speaker of advanced age was found in Natick. The language survived on Nantucket until the death of the widow Dorcas Honorable in 1855. On Martha's Vineyard, the language survived the longest. In 1808, a church official named Elisha Clap writing about the small congregation of the Baptist minister Zachariah Howwaswee (Hossueit) remarked, "Only a few aged Indians, who do not understand English, attend his meeting, as he preaches in the native language ...." Howwaswee continued preaching until his death sometime in the 1830s. It is not known when the last speakers perished, but Tamsen Weekes, who died in 1890 at the age of 90, was likely one of the last fluent speakers. Studies of the Wampanoag tribe in the 1920s did not find any native speakers, but only those who remembered small bits of the language.

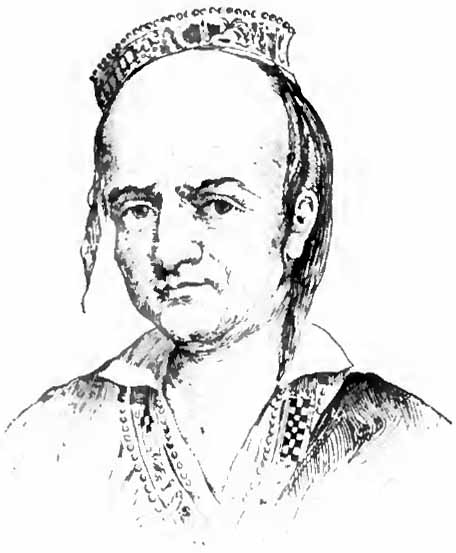
Metacomet ("King Philip") led Native Americans against the colonists; his defeat ended local Native autonomy in New England.

The language declined for several reasons. The population of speakers plummeted due to the effects of virgin soil epidemics of smallpox, measles, diphtheria and scarlet fever that continued to claim indigenous lives well into the nineteenth century, but began with a particularly severe outbreak of leptospirosis in 1619 that claimed the lives of up to 90% of coastal populations where Massachusett-language speakers resided. This reduced their ability to resist neighboring tribes, such as the Mohawk and Tarratine, and the influx of English settlers.

War also greatly reduced the population. The ravages of King Philip's War (1675–76) is believed to have reduced the population by 40%, due to executions, retaliatory attacks and displacement. Many of the Praying Indians that remained neutral were rounded up and left on islands in Boston Harbor where many perished from disease, starvation and exposure to the elements. Others were sold into slavery in the West Indies. Many of the indigenous people decided to leave, seeking safety with the Abenaki to the north or the Mahican to the west, where they would eventually assimilate into the host tribe. Many men were called to fight alongside the English colonists against the French and their Native American allies during the French and Indian Wars, a series of conflicts between 1688 and 1763 as well as the American Revolutionary War (1775–1783). The gender imbalance led to increased intermarriage between Native American women and black or white men outside the speech community.

Loss of land forced language shift in other ways. Only Mashpee and Aquinnah remained in Native American hands by the end of the nineteenth century. The Native Americans were no longer able to support themselves on agriculture and subsistence as their lands were lost due to encroachment and land sales. This forced men to seek employment as laborers, mariners or whalers in coastal cities whereas women and children found employment as domestics in White households or as peddlers of baskets. The shrinking communities were no longer able to support separate church congregations that traditionally used the language. The population also became a smaller and smaller minority with the growth in the population of descendants of English settlers and large-scale arrival of newcomers from Europe in the nineteenth century, exacerbating already existing assimilation pressures.

== Revival ==
The language remained in use the longest in speech and writing in the isolated, insular Wôpanâak communities, but as its use slowly faded, many believed that it would return with the help of descendants of those who destroyed it. Massachusett-language documents in the form of land sales, leases and deeds are found in the oldest layer of city and town archives in Massachusetts. The petitions and complaints to the General Court of Massachusetts were often sent in English and in Massachusett. The records of the former Praying Town and now just town of Natick, Massachusetts, are in Massachusett from 1651 until 1720. The Native Americans also maintained their libraries of religious manuscripts and personal records even as the language ceased to be spoken, many of which were later sold to private collectors and ultimately are now in the possession of the Massachusetts Historical Society. In addition, all the Native American translations and original works by the English missionaries have been preserved.

The Natick Dictionary, published in 1903 and based on the work of Dr. James H. Trumbull, includes descriptions of vocabulary, mainly from Eliot's Bible but also that of the other missionaries and Roger William's A Key .... The documents of the Native Americans were extensively analyzed by Ives Goddard and Kathleen Bragdon, with the 1988 release of Native Writings in Massachusett. Reconstructions of gaps in grammar, syntax, vocabulary and pronunciation could be filled by comparison with other related Algonquian languages or by reconstructions based on likely sound changes, such as George F. Aubin's Proto-Algonquian Dictionary of 1975.

As acceptance and appreciation of Native American culture grew in the early twentieth century, the local peoples of southern New England began to reconnect through Pan-Native American movements and gatherings, adopting aspects of Plains Indian culture and sharing surviving aspects of traditional culture and language. Many Native Americans attended the Aquidneck Indian Council meetings in Providence, Rhode Island, or took part in the Indian Council of New England in 1923.

The anthropologist and Eastern Woodlands Culture expert Frank Speck visited the Wampanoag of Mashpee and tried to document the language, but was able to list only twenty words, acquiring them with great difficulty from five of the oldest members in the community. Similarly, Gladys Tantaquidgeon (Mohegan) visited the Wampanoag of Aquinnah. She was able to extract one hundred words from those of most advanced age, her success likely from her attempts to preserve her own language, which became extinct in 1908 with the death of her aunt, Dji'ts Bud dnaca. Gordon Day recorded a reading of the Lord's Prayer from Chief Wild Horse, Clinton Mye Haynes (1894–1966) of Mashpee, in 1961. Wild Horse was likely one of the last language rememberers.

In 1993, Jessie Little Doe Baird, of the Mashpee Wampanoag, began the Wôpanâak Language Reclamation Project as a co-founder. She began her studies at the Massachusetts Institute of Technology (MIT). Working with Dr. Kenneth Hale and later Norvin Richards, Baird was able to reconstruct the pronunciation, grammar and vocabulary of the Native American documents and English missionary translations. Baird later published her thesis, Introduction to Wampanoag Grammar in 2000, the year she completed her Master's in Algonquian Linguistics. The WLRP later expanded to include participants in the Ahquinnah, Herring Pond and Assonet tribes of the Wôpanâak. Since Kenneth Hale was a direct descendant of the missionary Roger Williams and Baird a direct descendant of Nathan Pocknett, who resisted conversion attempts, they fulfilled the Wôpanâak prophecy regarding the language's revival.

== Current status ==
In 2010, Baird was presented the MacArthur Foundation Genius Award in recognition of her language revival efforts. The following year, PBS aired portions of Anne Makepeace's documentary Âs Nutayanyean-We Still Live Here as a segment on the program Independent Lens. The film highlighted Baird's work, as well as interviews with members of the WLRP-participating tribes discussing the project's history, reception, goals and the experiences as the language was revived in their communities.

In 2014, the Wôpanâak Language Reclamation Project was able to boast of a handful of children who were growing up as native speakers for the first time in over a century, 15 proficient speakers, two trained Algonquian linguists, a dictionary with approximately 12,000 entries at the time, pedagogical materials and a complete, non-English educational curriculum, and hundreds of students at various stages of language study. In addition, it has enabled a return of use of the language in cultural, spiritual and sacred expressions of Native American identity. The WLRP continues to host educational programs, language immersion summer camps and after-school sessions, and special language days with the four communities that participate.

Original plans for the Weetumuw Wôpanâak Charter School, with plans to open in August 2015, were shelved, as organizers said they would not be able to meet the statutory requirement that their students comprise the lowest tenth percentile of MCAS scores. Jennifer Weston, who serves as the Immersion School Developer and as the Mashpee Wampanoag Tribe Language Department Director, said that "Since we didn't meet that statutory requirement, our application's fate rested on two other groups being approved first." The decision was also influenced by the conflicting political climate: Republican Governor Charlie Baker proposed to lift the cap on charter schools, but a bill was being considered that was popular with teacher's unions and public opinion hoping for a moratorium.

Instead, the WLRP opened Mukayuhsak Weekuw, 'Children's House', a language immersion school at the Montessori Academy of North Falmouth, Massachusetts, with a dozen students. Later in November 2016, the school was moved onto Mashpee Wampanoag tribal property, to be closer to Mashpee, from where most of the WLRP staff, instructors and students come. In 2013, it was estimated that 6% of the students of the Mashpee Public School district were from the Mashpee Wôpanâak tribe. The project also received a three-year grant, which will allow the school to expand to 35 students and train four Montessori-style teachers, but it is likely that the slots may have to be awarded by lottery, given the interest in the project and its closer proximity to a tribal region.

Wampanoag spokesmen have objected to aspects of the National Geographic's Saints & Strangers (2015), a two-part Thanksgiving mini-series that explored the early history of the English settlers and Native Americans in Massachusetts. Baird and Linda Coombs, director of the Aquinnah Wampanoag Cultural Center, initially helped National Geographic as language consultants. They were rebuffed when they asked for authority to review the script before filming, "to ensure it was historically and culturally accurate and that any offensive material had been removed." When National Geographic refused to allow them to do that, the Wampanoag declined to participate. They said that the dialogue and cultural misconceptions were prejudiced, "stereotypical", and misguided, and certain events in the resulting film were historically wrong. The production company hired a different language consultant and coach, who translated the dialogue into Western Abenaki. A National Geographic spokesman said the production had noted that this was a cousin language to the Wampanoag of the original people who encountered early English settlers. Baird said, "To say that Abenaki is Wampanog is like saying Portuguese is Spanish ... Using the same language family like this is saying one Indian isn't any different than another Indian. One language isn't any different than another. It marginalizes an entire people."

== Phonology ==
=== Consonants ===
Massachusett consonants
	Labial	Alveolar	Palatal/ Postalveolar	Velar	Glottal
Stop	p	t	tʲ	k	
Affricate			tʃ		
Fricative		s	ʃ		h
Nasal	m	n			
Approximant	w		j		

Massachusett consonants lack voicing and aspiration. Aspiration, or the puff of air released after a consonant, is common in English in initial consonants or for clarity and emphasis, but not the second element of consonant clusters or syllable-final positions. Thus, Massachusett /p/ is more akin to the [p] in spin [spɪn] than the [pʰ] in pin [pʰɪn]. The unaspirated /p/ may sound voiced and confused with English /b/. Massachusett does not seem to have made any distinctions between voiced and unvoiced consonants as they exist in English, and so the colonial alphabet used voiced-unvoiced pairings such as B/P, G/C-K, J/Ch, Z/S, D/T and G(w)/Q(u) interchangeably, although it is possible that some consonants were voiced as allophonic variations, or sounded voiced to the English missionaries. As voicing is not a phonemic part of the language, the modern alphabet has purged the voiced letters save proper and personal names and loanwords that have not yet been assimilated or replaced. A sound similar to the sound /tʲ/ is found in UK English tune; it was often confused by missionary writers as /tʃ/ and written with ⟨t⟩ or ⟨j⟩. It can be approximated by pronouncing the 'ti' in tiara rapidly. It can be confused with ⟨te⟩, which was used in the colonial and currently in the modern script to represent T followed by an 'infected vowel' which together create the same sound with a short schwa, /tʲə̆/.

=== Vowels ===
Massachusett vowel inventory
	Front	Central	Back
Close	[iː]		[uː]
Mid		[ə],[ʲᵊ]	
Open	[aː], [a]		[ã]

The symmetric vowel inventory of Proto-Algonquian was reduced through mergers along the course of its development. Massachusett vowels can be divided into the long vowels /aː/, /iː/ and /uː/; the short vowels /a/ and /ə/ and the nasal vowel /ã/, which may also be considered a long vowel as it is stressed and lengthened in speech as the other long vowels.

The language is rich in various vowel combinations and diphthongs created with final /j/ and /w/, which are often productive verbal elements. Two vowels together usually indicate hiatus of two distinct sounds and not a true diphthong, e.g., English coagulate and naive. Thus, waapinum (wââpunum), 'to lift up', is pronounced /waːaːpənəm/ and not */waːːpənəm/. Nevertheless, combinations of vowels and vowel-glide consonant (semivowel) are particularly numerous, not limited to /a a/, /aː a/, /aː ã/ /ã ə/, /aː iː/, /ãwa/, /əj/, /əw/, /əwa/, /əwaː/, /əwã/, /əwə/, /awa/, /aːw/, /aw/, /ja/, /jã/, /iːw/, /uːaːã/, etc.

Due to the wide variance of spelling, the vowels have been hardest to reconstruct for the language. The exact value is unknown, and the vowels /a/, /ã/, and /aː/ could have had values of /ɑ/, /ɑ̃/, /ɑː/, or /ɔ/, /ɔ̃/, /ɔː/. Some dialects may have differed in pronunciation, perhaps using the sounds /ɔ̃/ and /ɑ/ to represent the letters /ô/ and /â/.

== Alphabet ==
Comparison of Colonial Massachusett and Modern Wôpanâak alphabets
Colonial			Modern			Colonial			Modern		
Letter	Values	Name	Letter	Values	Name	Letter	Values	Name	Letter	Values	Name
A a	/a/, /aː/, /ã/, /ə/	a	A a	/a/	a	N n	/n/, /~∅/	en	N n	/n/	na
			Â â	/aː/	â	O	/a/, /aː/, /ã/, /ə/	o			
B b	/b/, /p/	bee							Ô ô	/ã/	ô
C c	/k/, /s/, /ʃ/	ſee (see)				Ꝏ	/uː/, /wə/, /əw/, /ə/	ꝏ	Ȣ ȣ	/uː/	ȣ
Ch ch	/tʃ/, /tʲ/, /tʲᵊ/	chee	Ch ch	/tʃ/	cha	P p	/p/	pee	P p	/p/	pa
D d	/d/, /t/	dee				Q q	/kʷ/, /k/	kéuh	Q q	/kʷ/, /k/	qa
E e	/iː/, /ə/, /∅/	e	E e	/ʲᵊ/	e	R r	/r/, /n/	ar			
			Ee ee	/iː/	ee	S s ſ	/s/, /ʃ/	eſ (es)	S s	/s/	sa
F f	/f/, /p/	ef							Sh sh	/ʃ/	sha
G g	/g/, /k/, /dʒ/, /ʒ/	gee				T t	/t/	tee	T t	/t/	ta
H h	/h/, /∅/		H h	/h/	ha				Ty ty	/tʲ/	tya
I i	/ə/, /iː/, /aːj/, /aj/	i				U u	/uː/, /a/, /ə/	u	U u	/ə/	u
J j	/dʒ/, /ʒ/, /tʃ/, /tʲ/, /tʲᵊ/	ji				V v	/v/, /p/	vf (uf), úph			
K k	/k/	ka	K k	/k/	ka	W w	/w/	wee	W w	/w/	wa
L l	/l/, /n/	el				X	/ks/, /z/	eks			
M m	/m/, /~∅[/p/]/	em	M m	/m/	ma	Y y	/j/, /aj/, /aːj/, /iː/	wy	Y y	/j/	ya
						Z z	/z/, /s/	zad			
						Y (Þ) y (þ)	/θ~ð/, /t/				

The original alphabet devised by Eliot and used by the Native Americans of the mid-seventeenth till nineteenth centuries consisted of all 26 letters of the Latin alphabet as used in English, with the addition of the digraph ⟨Ch⟩ as a separate letter, similar to its role in Spanish prior to the 1994 Spanish orthographical reforms. The digraph ⟨Sh⟩ does not receive similar treatment. Vowels could be marked with the acute accent ( ´ ) to denote stress or long vowels or the circumflex ( ˆ ) used to indicate the nasal vowel /ã/, but despite this prescriptive use, most literate native speakers, and even Eliot, used them interchangeably. The double O ligature ⟨Ꝏ⟩ was used by Eliot primarily to indicate /uː/ as opposed to the short vowel /ə/, analogous to writing fꝏd and mꝏd but cook and rook; however, ⟨Ꝏ⟩ was not considered a separate letter and often replaced with ⟨OO⟩. ⟨F⟩, ⟨L⟩, ⟨R⟩ and ⟨V⟩ only occur in loan words. ⟨Y⟩ as the representation of the runic letter thorn (⟨Þ⟩) was used in Eliot's time as a shorthand for ⟨Th⟩, often written superscript or subscript in print to differentiate from ⟨Y⟩. Although not included in the colonial alphabet, its use would likely have occurred in some English loan words especially from the oldest Native American documents. ⟨J⟩ and ⟨V⟩, although not yet considered distinct letters in English of the seventeenth century, were treated as separate letters in Massachusett.

The alphabet in use by the Wôpanâak communities that participate in the language revival, the alphabet is much reduced and simplified. ⟨B⟩, ⟨D⟩, ⟨C⟩, ⟨F⟩, ⟨G⟩, ⟨I⟩, ⟨J⟩, ⟨L⟩, ⟨O⟩, ⟨R⟩, ⟨V⟩, ⟨X⟩ and ⟨Z⟩ are not part of the alphabet, but remain in use for proper names and place names. ⟨Ch⟩ remains a separate letter, to which the digraphs ⟨Sh⟩ /ʃ/ and ⟨Ty⟩ /tʲ/ have been included. ⟨Â⟩ and ⟨Ô⟩ are considered letters, but restricted to represent /aː/ and /ã/, respectively, and thus eliminating the need for the acute or circumflex. ⟨8⟩ replaces ⟨Ꝏ⟩ in the modern alphabet for ease of input and rendering on English typesets and is also considered a distinct letter. ⟨E⟩ is retained but restricted to represent /ʲᵊ/ whilst the digraph ⟨Ee⟩ is used as a separate letter for /iː/. The only letter with two sounds is ⟨Q⟩, which represents /k/ in word-final positions and /kʷ/ elsewhere before a vowel for etymological purposes.

=== Writing samples ===
Many of the translations in the Massachusett language were of a religious nature, as the missionaries were hoping to win over converts by using the 'Indian language'. The following is an example of the Lord's Prayer as found in Eliot's 1661 publishing of the New Testament in Matthew 6:9:

Nꝏshum keskqut quttianatamanack hꝏwesaouk.
'Our Father, who art in Heaven,'
Peyaumꝏutch kukkenau-toomoouk ne a nack okkeet neam keskqut.
'Hallowed be thy name, thy kingdom come, thy will be done, on earth as it is in heaven.
Nem-meet-sougash asekesuhokesu assnauean yedyee kesu-kod.
'Give us this day our daily bread,'
Kah ahquotaneas inneaen nummateheouqasu, neem machenekukequig nutahquoretawmomouag.
'and forgive us our trespasses, as we forgive those who trespass against us,'
Ahque sag hompagunaianeem enqutchuasouqauit webe pohquohwaossueau wutch matchitut.
'and lead us not into temptation, but deliver us from evil.'
Nuwatche huhahteem ketassootamouk hah nuumkessouk, kah sosamꝏuk michene. Amen
'For thine is the kingdom, and the power, and the glory, for ever and ever. Amen.'

An excerpt from Josiah Cotton's Vocabulary of the Massachusetts (or Natick) Indian Language, where the English is his own writings, and the Massachusett that of his father, John Cotton, a prominent preacher to the Wampanoag:

Q: Uttuh woh nittinne nehtuhtauan Indianne unnontꝏwaonk?
'How shall I learn Indian?'
A: Nashpe keketookauaonk Indianeog kah kuhkinasineat ukittooonkannꝏ kah wuttinnohquatumꝏonkanꝏ.
'By talking with the Indians, and minding their words, and manner of pronouncing.'

Q: Kah uttuh unnupponꝏnat wutinnontꝏwaonk ne munohonk neit kohtohkomukcouk?
'And what is the difference between the language of the Island [Martha's Vineyard], and the main?'
A: Mat woh nummissohhamꝏunasuh matta aꝏwahiteo webe yeu nꝏwahteauum yeug Indiansog mat wahtanooog usg Indiansog ut nishnow kuttooonganit.
'I can't tell or don't know, only this I know, that these Indians don't understand every word of them Indians.'

An example of records from the Praying Town of Natick, written in 1700 by Thomas Waban, a descendant of Waban:

Eight noh July wehquttum Thomas . Waban seniar wutch neh
'July 8. Thomas Waban Senior requested on behalf of his'
wunneechonnoh ' nneh Thomas waban Junior ' onk noh
'son, Thomas Waban Junior, and he'
wachonnum ' 2 ' arcers medow -
'has two acres of meadow.'
Ne nan kesukokot wehquttum Jon wamsquon – wutch
'The same day John Wamsquon requested on behalf of'
Tomas wamsquon onk woh wachonum meddow kah
'Thomas Wamsquon, and he may have a meadow, and'
owachannumun ' n4e nan ut – noh wehquttum – Isaak
'he has it. On the same Isaak'
wuttasukꝏpauin ne keesukot onk noh woh wachonnum
'Wuttasukoopauin requested, that day, and he may have'
two arcours ut wohquomppagok.
'two acres at Wohquomppagok.'

Conveyance of land from Soosooahquo to Noshcampaet, from Nantucket, in 1686

Neen Soosahquo mache noonammattammen noshcampaet
'I Soosoahquo have bargained well with Noshcampaet,'
ta matahketa ahto ahkuh nukquepaskooe akerssoe wana
'At Mattahketa he has land, one hundred and'
nees akannu ta weessoonkiahkuh kattahtam meth wana
'two acres. At land by name Kattahtammeth and'
kabeaqut kashkututkquaonk neahmute kushinemahchak
'kabeaqut kashkuhtukqusonk neahmute that swamp is wide'
ne sechak wuttah naskompeat wessoonck ahkuh mussnata-
'the length of Naskompeat's land, (and) land by name Mussantaessuit,'
-essuit ne anneh kishkoh wessoonk ahkuh massooskaassak
'(and) the width of land by name Massooskaassak,'
wana wessooonk sakahchah nuppessunahqunmeth na-
'and by name Sakashchah nuppessunnahquemmeth as far as'
pache kuttahkanneth ahquampi 1686 month 10th day 3d.
'Kuttahkemmeth. The time was 1686, 10th month, 3d day.'

== Grammar ==
The Massachusett language shared several features in common with other Algonquian languages. Nouns have gender based on animacy, often considered to reflect the traditional worldview of the speakers on what has spirit versus what does not (e.g. a body would be animate, but the parts of the body are inanimate). Nouns are also marked for obviation, with nouns less relevant to the discourse marked apart from nouns that are more so. Personal pronouns distinguish three persons, two numbers (singular and plural), inclusive and exclusive first-person plural, and proximate and obviative third-persons. Nouns are also marked as absentative, especially when referring to lost items or deceased persons. Sentence structures are typically SVO or SOV, but deviation from strict word order is possible due to the synthetic structure. Verbs are quite complex, and can be broken into four classes of verbs: animate-intransitive (AI), inanimate-intransitive (II), animate-transitive (AT), and inanimate-transitive (IT), depending on the animacy of the subject (for intransitive verbs) or object (for transitive ones). Verbs can also be supplied with various other prefixes and suffixes, so complex things can easily be described just by a verb.

== Vocabulary ==
Massachusett shares most of its vocabulary with other Algonquian languages. The following table, mostly taken from D. J. Costa's description of the SNEA languages, demonstrates the relationship of Massachusett with other languages, such as closely related Eastern Algonquian languages such as the Loup and Narragansett—both also SNEA languages—Penobscot, a representative of the Eastern branch of Abenakian languages, Munsee, a Lenape language, and more distant relatives, such as Arapaho, a Plains Algonquian language and Ojibwe, a Central Algonquian language.

English	Massachusett	Loup (Nipmuc?)	Narragansett	Penobscot	Munsee	Arapaho	Ojibwe
'deer'	ahtuhq	attekeȣe	nóonatch	nòlke	atóh	hé3owoonéihii	adik (Note: As 'deer', 'caribou', or 'cattle' in Algonquin language but 'caribou' in Ojibwe language proper.)
'my father'	noohsh	nȣs	nòsh	n'mitangwes	noxwe	neisónoo	noose
'canoe'	muhshoon	amisȣl	mishoon	ámasol	amaxol	3iiw	jiimaan
'hawk'	owóshaog ('hawks')			awéhle ('broadwinged hawk')	'awéhleew	cecnóhuu	gekek
'three'	nushwe	chȣi	nìsh	nahs	nxáh	nehi	niswi
'thirty'	swinnichak	chȣinchak	swínchek	nsinska	nxináxke		nisimidama
'broken'	poohkshau	pȣkȣ'sau	pokésha	poskwenômuk ('to break')	paxkhílew ('it breaks')	tówo'oni ('to break')	bookoshkaa
'dog'	annum	alum	ayim	adia	mwáakaneew	he3	anim(osh) (Note: As anim for 'dog' in Algonquin language and in Oji-Cree language, but animosh (anim with a pejorative suffix) in Ojibwe language proper.)
'flint'	môshipsq	mansibsqȣe		masipskw	mahləs	wóosóó3	biiwaanag(oonh)

=== English influences in the Massachusett language ===
With the arrival of the English colonists, the Native Americans quickly began to adopt English in order to communicate and participate in wider society by necessity as the English settlers came to surround and outnumber the natives. The Native Americans adopted the new crops—oates, barley, wheatash, rye; animal husbandry and domesticated animals—oxin, gôates, maresog, hogs; tools and farming methods and material culture—chember ('chamber'), puneetur ('pewter'), patakoot ('petticoat'), coneeko ('calico' garments), etc. As the Native Americans began to lose their autonomy and were settled into the Praying towns, adopting Christianity—deacon, Bibl, Testament, commandment; colonial laws and courts—seal, mark, entered by, king, justice; naming customs—Junior, Senior; and eventually adopted the English system of measurements—miles, arcours (acres); calendar systems—January, month, Tuesday, year; and self-government—jureeman ('juryman'), tithingman ('tithe collector'), selectmons ('selectman'), consteppe ('constable') and economics—shillings, pence, monêash ('money'), deed, etc. In addition, many words were introduced by the missionaries unable to find or unaware of a suitable Massachusett translation, thus introducing the proper people and place names of the Bible and various concepts, many of which were later adopted by the Native Americans—horsumoh Pharoah ('Pharoah's horsmen'), shepsoh ('shepherd'), cherubimsog, ark, Moab, Canaane, Jerusalem, lattice, etc.

A number of words were borrowed in their English plural form, used in their singular, and pluralized to however the Native Americans assumed whether the term in question was animate or inanimate. For example, oxsin ('oxen'), peegs ('pigs') and cows ('cows') represented the singular 'ox', 'pig' and 'cow' and but were rendered in the plural as oxinog ('oxenak'), pigsack ('pigsack') and cowsog ('cowsak') for 'oxen', 'pigs' and 'cows'. Mass nouns were also often adopted this way and appear in the plural, for example barleyash ('barleyash'), monêash ('moneyash') and shottash ('shotash') for 'barley', 'money' and 'shot' (fired). Most nouns encountered in their plural were realized this way. Other loans, most of which would probably been more commonly heard in the singular were also thus adopted, giving saut ('salt'), Indian ('Indian') and plantation ('plantation').

Due to the complex consonant and vowel inventory of English in comparison to Massachusett, English loan words were pronounced in one of two ways. Those who were more proficient and bilingual in English likely pronounced them closer to English pronunciation with most speakers adapting it to local Massachusett phonology. This can be seen in US English, with more educated speakers or those with some French-language familiarity pronouncing the loan word guillotine as either anglicized /ˈɡɪləˌtiːn/ or /gē'əˌtiːn/ in approximation of French /ɡijɔtin/). This may explain the Massachusett doublet Frenchmensog and Panachmonsog for 'Frenchmen'. This can be seen in writing, where many loans were spelled in Massachusett, either roughly the same as in English or indicating adaptation. As /l/ and /r/ do not occur in the language, they were replaced with /n/, for example in pinaquet and shaan for 'blanket' and 'share' or omitted altogether in citi, 'cider', and consteppe for 'constable'.

English loan words were modified with the complex Algonquian noun declension and verb conjugation system, for example, ꝏmak (umark), 'her/his mark', baansu ('boundsuw'), 'it is the bounds', nukohtꝏmun ('nucourtumun'), 'we (exclusive) [held] court', and nugquitglamwaan ('nuquitclaim[w]un'), 'I quitclaim it.' Some were used as adjectives or modifiers, such as stakkisohtug ('stakesuhtuq) 'wooden stake', applesank ('applesôhq') 'appletree', Indian moewehkomonk 'Indian assembly'.

Despite the relative influence of English, especially in the latter stages when the number of native speakers was quite few, written documents often showed little English vocabulary. This was in part because of the agglutinative native of the language, as new words could be easily formed to express new concepts, as well as possibly a linguistic statement. Many loans were in opposition with native vocabulary, although sometimes one or the other seems to have specialized uses. For example, although Friday and day were used in Massachusett, when not referring to formal dates, in deeds and legal documents, speakers could also use nequttatashikquinishonk (nuqutahshuquneehshôk) and kesuk (keesuk) in general usage. Similar specialization occurred with manitt (manut) /manət/ which meant 'god' or 'spirit' and was later replaced by God or Jehovah manitt. The importance of the English language to seek employment, communicate with neighboring English settlers and participate in the affairs outside dwindling Native American communities and growing rates of intermarriage in the nineteenth century led speakers to switch to Massachusett Pidgin English, but through a process similar to decreolization, speakers eventually assimilated into the locally prominent speech of Eastern New England English dialects.

=== Massachusett influences in the English language ===
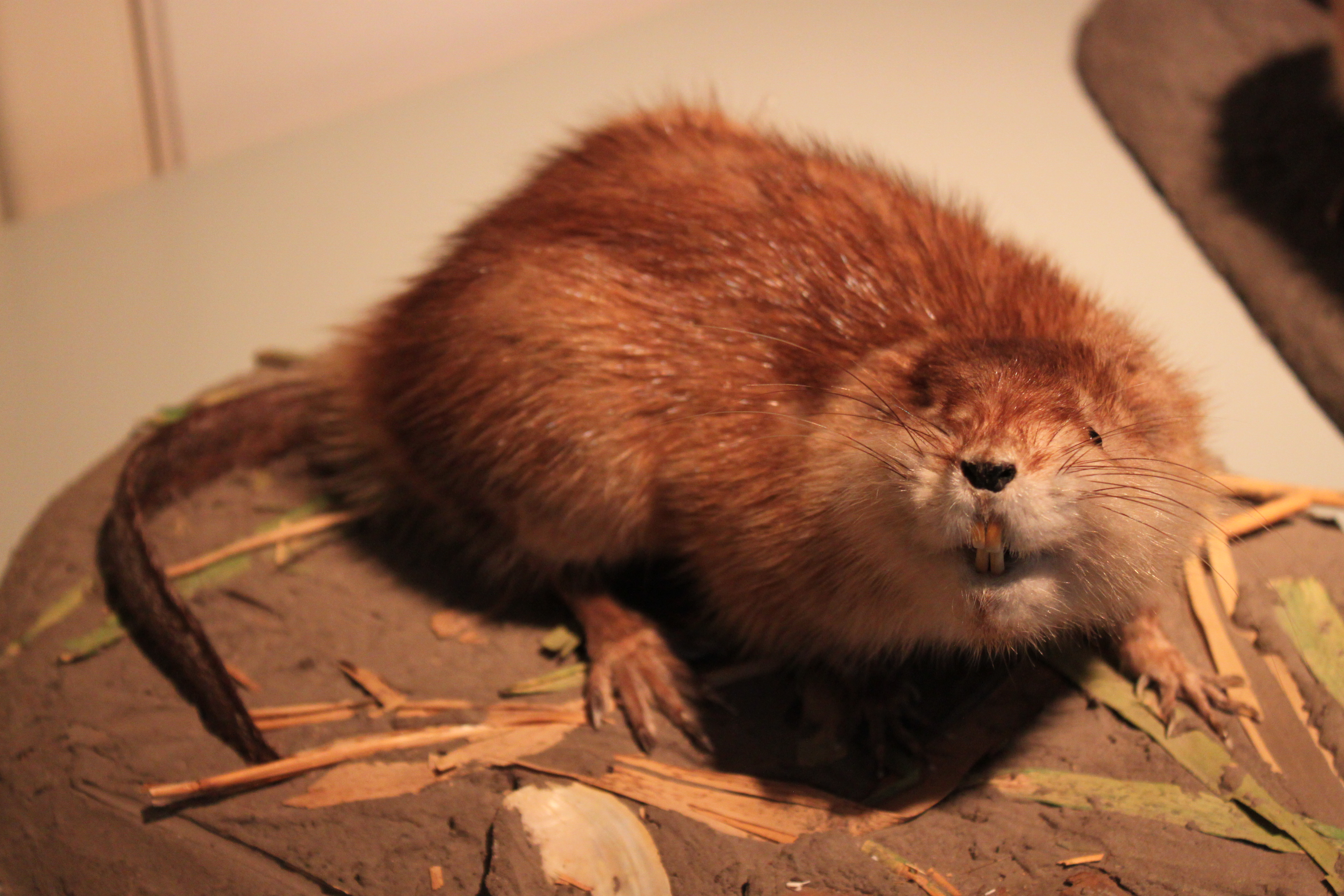
The word 'muskrat' is from Massachusett musquash meaning 'reddish animal'.

After the failed settlement of Roanoke (1585) and the first permanent settlement at Jamestown (1607)—near speakers of Powhatan languages—shifted to New England with failed attempts at Cuttyhunk (1602) and Cape Ann (1624) and successful settlement of Plymouth (1621), Salem (1628), Massachusetts Bay (1629)—all in what is now Massachusetts and in the midst of Massachusett-speaking peoples—and a few other sites in New England. The earliest settlers struggled in the colder climate of New England, with their lives dependent on the Native American peoples for education on local agriculture, food aid, protection from less welcoming tribes and a market for trade. Through these close interactions, the English settlers adopted hundreds of words, probably hundreds more when compounds and calques of Massachusett phrases are included. The Algonquian loan words were known as 'wigwam words' with wigwam coming from Massachusett Pidgin for 'house' or 'home'.

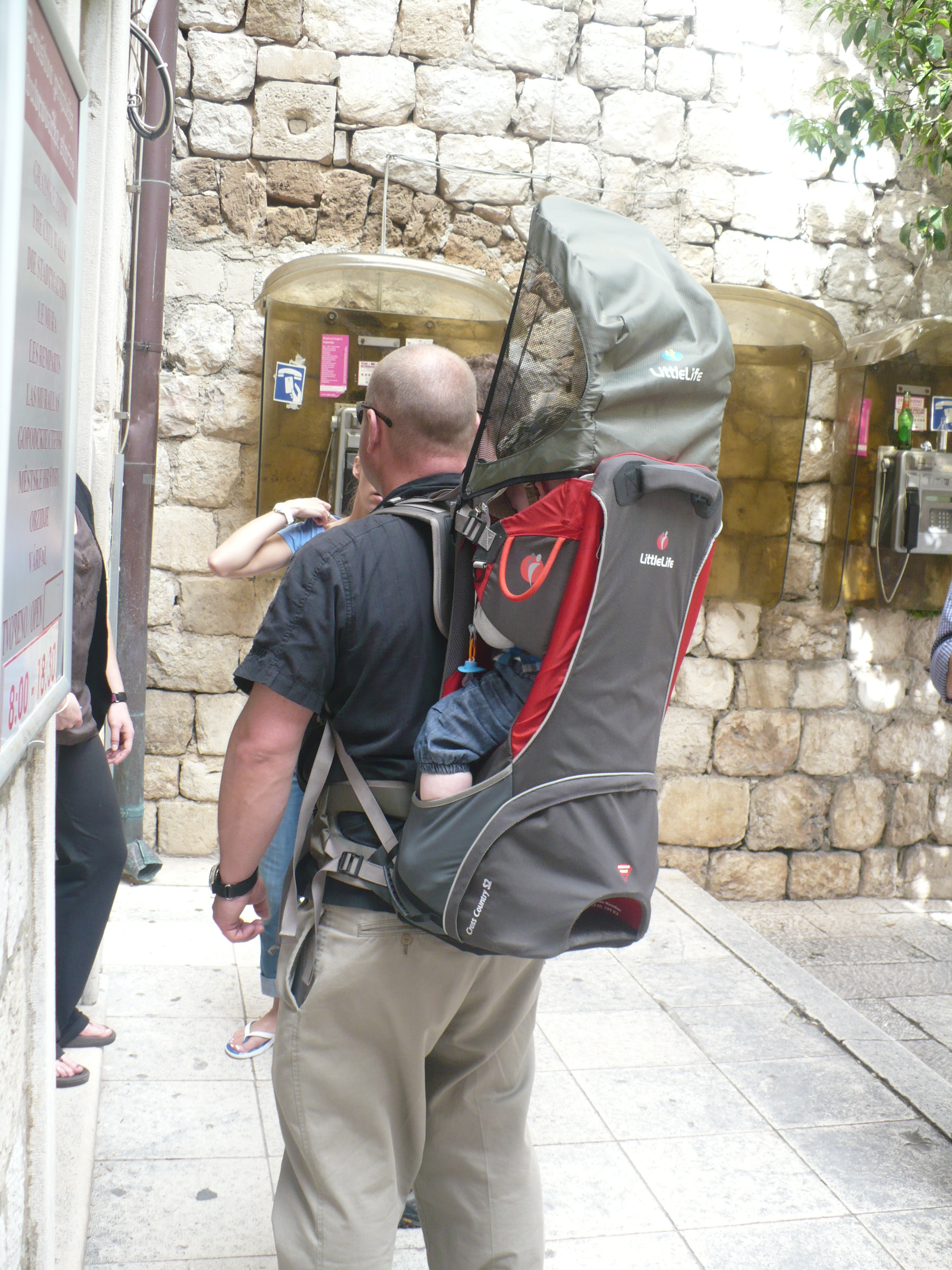
Man with a baby in a papoose

Many of the common words such as papoose (which originally referred to the Native American children), squash and moccasin were popularized in 1643, even back in England, with the publication of Roger Williams' A Key into the Language of America and as a result, are often given a Narragansett etymology. Most words were likely borrowed independently until a common form won out, or re-enforced each other through similarity. For example, New Englanders used wauregan to mean 'handsome' and 'showy' until the end of the nineteenth century from an SNEA R-dialect, most likely from Quiripi wauregan, but the first settlers in Massachusetts were already familiar with the older cognate form wunnegin from Massachusett wunnégan (wuneekan) from N-dialect Massachusett. Furthermore, the English settlers of the failed Popham Colony, and later settlements in what is now Maine and New Hampshire encountered mos from Eastern Abenakian, whilst settlers in the rest of New England encountered mꝏs from the SNEA languages, ultimately coalescing into English moose. Other forms were shortened beyond recognition, with squash a shortened slang form of original borrowings isquontersquash or squantersquash from Massachusett askꝏtasquash (ashk8tasqash) or Narragansett askútasquash. Many of these 'Narragansett' terms were already known to the English settlers of Massachusetts Bay and Plymouth, with William Wood recording pappousse and mawcus sinnus from Pawtucket speakers of Massachusett and published in his 1634 New Englands Prospect nine years before Williams' papoòs and mocússinass.

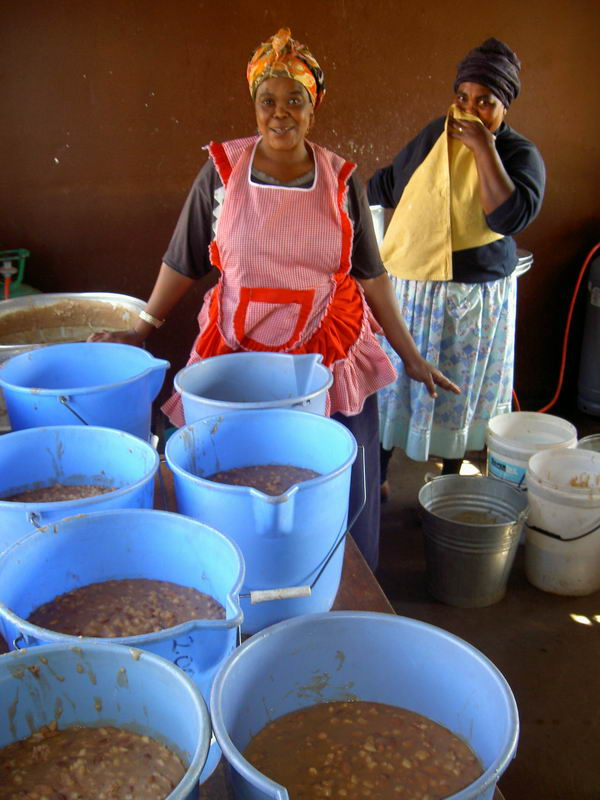
South African women sell samp, an African name (from Massachusett nasaump) for a corn gruel like that of the Massachusett.

With westward expansion, many of the 'wigwam words' from New England and even the 'backward' grammar and syntax of Massachusett Pidgin English were carried westward by the descendants of the early colonists in communication with Native peoples, with the innocent meaning of these words changing to pejoratives or stereotypical language by the late eighteenth century as westward expansion and the pursuit of Manifest Destiny ultimately became a protracted genocide of mass killings and biological warfare. As the newly subjugated peoples of the frontier were often not Algonquian speakers and unfamiliar with these terms, they nevertheless resented the specific vocabulary used against them. Most notable is squaw, borrowed from Massachusett squa (sqâ) and which simply meant 'female' in general. However, as it was used only as an insult, with connotations of the submissive, obedient Native American wife, the outspoken old Native woman or the exotic temptress of the wilderness, folk etymologies have been assigned that many contemporary people believe, such as the origin of the word from an old Iroquoian phrase for female genitals.

Tribal groups, Native advocacy groups and social pressure has led to name changes of several species and place names, but squaw remains a common element in these domains. Similarly, many of the Algonquian loan words such as firewater, bury the hatchet, wampum, papoose, powwow and brave can be used to construct offensively, stereotypical sentences, especially when used in Native-specific contexts; they were long used in the condescending, paternalistic writings of explorers, government anthropologists and agency reports and nineteenth century literature referencing the 'last' of the 'noble savages', such as James Fenmoore Cooper's 1826 Last of the Mohegans which re-introduced many of the fading terms of the colonial period. Use of the wigwam words in these disparaging contexts were cited as one of the primary reasons for high drop-out rates of Native American high school students, often served by European-American teachers.

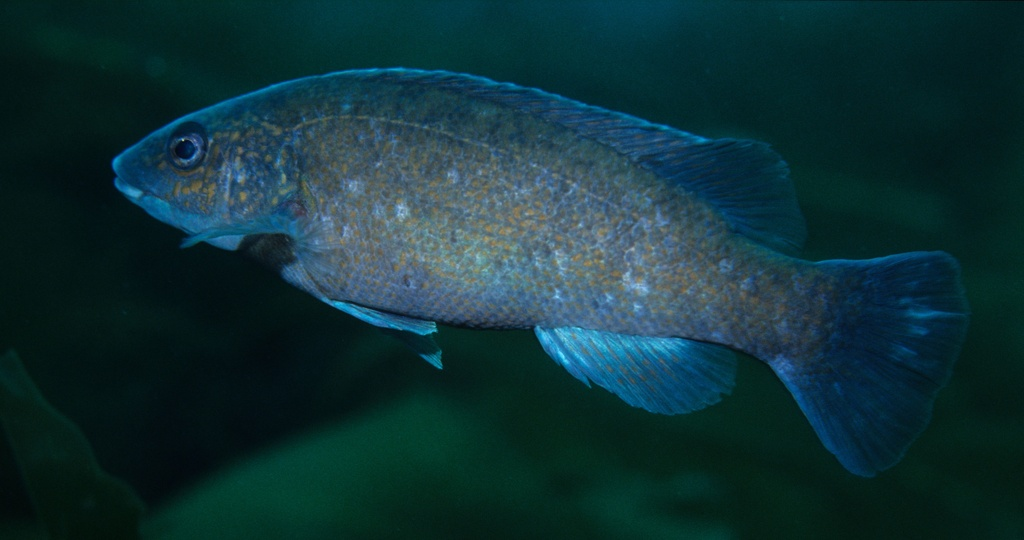
Tautogolabrus adspersus, also called 'chogset' (Massachusett chohkesit (chahkusut), 'it is blemished' or 'it is spotted'

The coastal dialects of Eastern New England English absorbed many more of these words due to longer interaction and the fact that they are spoken over the territory of Massachusett and related languages. The majority of Algonquian loan words fell into obscurity by the end of the nineteenth century, coinciding locally with the death of the last speakers of Massachusett as well as nationally with the complete subjugation of all of North America's indigenous peoples and policies, largely successful, implemented to eradicate Native American political units, languages and culture. Most of the local dialectal words suffered the same fate, but a legacy of it survives in the use of quahog and chogset to refer to the 'hard-shelled clam' or 'round clam' Mercenaria mercenaria and an edible wrasse fish, Tautoga onitis, known elsewhere as black porgy, chub, blackfish or oyster-fish. The dwindled vocabulary, only fifty or so terms from New England are still current and most only locally are nevertheless important for two reasons. Firstly, they represent the second oldest and largest corpus of Algonquian loan words after Powhatan, and are among the first true 'Americanisms' that began to differentiate American English. Secondly, the Massachusett loan words resisted replacement to lexical borrowings from other indigenous languages. Although American English has since adopted 'tipi', 'hogan' and 'quiggly hole' to refer to quite different housing structures, in the early part of the nineteenth century, referring to them all as wigwams was commonplace as it was already adopted as the general word for a Native American dwelling.

Most of the 'wigwam words', including wigwam, were not borrowed directly from Massachusett but instead were drawn from Massachusett Pidgin. Simpler in grammar, it also incorporated archaic word forms and forms from neighboring languages understood over a broader region. For instance, the English settlers used sachem and sagamore somewhat interchangeably to refer to tribal leaders or 'chiefs'. Sachem is likely from Massachusett sontim or sachem (sôtyum) whereas sagamore, from Massachusett Pidgin sagamore (*sôkumô), either an archaic construction or from Eastern Abenakian sàkama, but all descend from Proto-Algonquian *sa·kima·wa. Similarly, the English settlers adopted meechum for 'food' and wigwam for 'house' from Pidgin meechum (*meechum) and wigwam (*weekuwôm), with the proper Massachusett terms being meetsuwonk (meechuwôk) and wek (week), 'her/his house', or wetu (weetyuw), 'house' (in general), respectively, with all forms descendants of Proto-Algonquian *wi·kiwa·ʔmi.

Plants, animals and foods

- moose, 'Eurasian Elk/American Moose' (Alces alces), mꝏs/(m8s).
- skunk, 'skunk' (Mephitis mephitis), squnck/(sukôk).
- muskrat, 'muskrat' (Ondatra zibithecus), musquash, 'reddish animal'.
- tautog, 'blackfish' (Tautoga onitis), from Narragansett tautauog (pl.).
- menhaden, 'fishes used for fertilizer' (Brevoortia or Ethmidium species), a blend of pauhagan, used in northern New England, and Narragansett munnawhatteaûg from a base that means 'he fertilizes.'
- scup, 'a bream fish' (Stenotomus chrysops). Narragansett mishcup. Also appears as scuppaug.
- porgy, name for fishes of the family Sparidae, including scup, sheepshead and breams. Because of local Eastern New England English dialectal pronunciation, it also appears as paugee.
- neshaw, 'silver stage' of American eel (Anguilla americana), used by locals of Martha's Vineyard. From (neesw-), 'double' or 'pair', cf. neeshauog, 'they go in pairs.'
- pishaug, 'young female Surf scoter', (Melanitta perspicillata).
- samp, 'porridge of ground maize kernels', from Natick nausampe or Narragansett nasaump.
- nocake, 'Johnnycake', from nꝏhkik/(n8hkuk)
- squash, originally a short form of askoquash, askutasqash, or squantersqash. Refers to domesticated varieties of Cucurbita commonly known as pumpkins, squash and gourds in North America, and as marrows in other parts of the English-speaking world.
- pumpkin, refers to the large, orange cultivars of Cucurbita pepo var. pepo and similar looking winter squashes. Originally referred to as pompions. From pôhpukun, 'grows forth round.'
- quahog, 'hard clam' (Mercenaria mercenaria). Cf. Narragansett poquauhok. From the Wampanoag dialect, the fishermen of Nantucket used the term pooquaw.
- succotash, a 'dish of beans and corn'. Cf. Narrangansett msickquatash, 'shelled boiled corn kernels', and Massachusett sohquttaham, 'he or she shells (the corn).'

Native American Tools, Technology, Society and Culture

- matchit, 'bad'. From matchit and verb base (mat-), 'bad'.
- papoose, from 'child'. Cf. Natick papaseit and Naragansett papoos.
- moccasin, 'shoe'. From mokus/(mahkus).
- netop, 'my friend'. From netomp/(neetôp).
- peag, 'money', short for wampumpeag, referring to the shell beads confused for money by the English settlers. Also 'wampum'.
- sachem, 'chief'. From sontim or sachem/(sôtyum).
- pogamoggan, 'club' or 'rod'. From pogkomunk.
- manitou, 'spirit' or 'deity'. Cognate with manitt/(manut)
- pow wow, 'Native American gathering' or 'gatherings' in general. Originally referred to a 'shaman'. From powwow/(pawâw), 'he heals.'
- kinnikinnick, 'herbal smoking mixture'. Delawaran, but cognate with kenugkiyeuonk from (keenuk-), 'to mix'.
- nunkom, 'young man'. From nunkomp.
- totem, 'spiritual, symbolic or sacred emblem of a tribe'. Cognate with wutohkit, 'belonging to this place'.
- caucus, 'meeting for political supporters'. Possibly derives from a form similar to kogkateamau, 'he/she advises', and (kakâhkutyum-), 'to advise others'.
- hominy, 'nixtamalized corn' often eaten as grits. Cognate with (taqaham-), 'to grind'..
- mugwump, formerly used to mean 'kingpin' or 'kingmaker'; later to describe Republican bolters during that supported Grover Cleveland and now to politically neutral, independent people or bolters. Originally referred to a 'war leader'. From magunquomp.
- toshence, 'last of anything' although once used in southeastern Massachusetts to mean 'last child'. From mattasons, 'youngest child'.
- muskeg, 'swamp'. From Cree, but cognate with Narragansett metchaug, 'thick woods'.
- wickakee, 'hawkweed' also known in New England as 'Indian paintbrush'. Refers to several species of Hieracium.
- pung, shortened form of tom pung, 'one-horse sleigh'.
- tomahawk, 'ax' ('axe') or 'hatchet'. From Powhatan, but cognate with tongkong.

=== Topographical legacy ===
Numerous streets, ponds, lakes, hills, and villages across eastern Massachusetts have Massachusett-language origins. The name of the state itself may mean 'near the big hill' or 'hill shaped like an arrowhead'. Very few cities and towns have Massachusett names, most ultimately linked to towns and villages in England, but the ones that probably have a Massachusett origin include Acushnet ('calm water resting place'), Aquinnah ('under the hills'). Cohasset (quonnihasset, 'long fishing point'), Mashpee (massanippe, 'great water'), Nantucket, 'in the midst of the waters', Natick, 'place of hills', Saugus ('the outlet, the extension'), Scituate, 'cold brook', Seekonk, 'Canada goose', and Swampscott, 'at the red rock' or 'broken waters'. Other notable Indian placenames include Shawmut (mashauwomuk, former name for Boston, 'canoe landing place'), Neponset (a river that flows through the Dorchester section of Boston and a village of Dorchester, meaning unknown), Cuttyhunk Island (poocuohhunkkunnah, 'a point of departure'), Nantasket (a beach in Hull, 'a low-ebb tide place'), and Mystic River ('great river').

==== Cities and towns ====
- Acushnet
- Aquinnah
- Cohasset
- Mashpee
- Nahant
- Nantucket
- Natick
- Saugus
- Scituate
- Seekonk
- Swampscott

==== Cities known by previous names ====
- Agawam (Dartmouth)
- Agawam (Ipswich)
- Attitash (Amesbury)
- Cochichewick (Andover)
- Conahasset (Cohasset)
- Manamooskeagin (Abington)
- Massabequash (Marblehead)
- Meeshawn (Truro, Massachusetts)
- Menotomy (Arlington)
- Monatiquot (Braintree)
- Monomoy (Chatham)
- Nauset (Eastham)
- Nemasket (Middleborough)
- Naumkeag (Salem)
- Pentucket (Haverhill)
- Ponkapoag (Canton)
- Shawsheen (Billerica)
- Shawmut (Boston)
- Squantum (Quincy)
- Uncataquisset (Milton)
- Watuppa (Freetown)
- Wessagusset (Weymouth)
- Winnissimet (Chelsea)

==== Villages ====
- Acapesket (Falmouth)
- Annawan (Rehoboth)
- Annasnappet (Carver)
- Annisquam (Gloucester)
- Antassawamock (Mattapoisett)
- Aquashenet (Mashpee)
- Ashumet (Falmouth)
- Assabet (Maynard)
- Assinippi (Hanover)
- Assonet (Freetown)
- Attitash (Amesbury)
- Aucoot (Mattapoisett)
- Canaumet (Bourne)
- Chappaquiddick Island (Edgartown)
- Chebacco (Essex)
- Cochesett (West Bridgewater)
- Cochituate (Wayland)
- Conomo (Essex)
- Copicut (Fall River)
- Cotuit (Barnstable)
- Cummaquid (Barnstable)
- Hockanum (Barnstable)
- Humarock (Scituate)
- Hyannis (Barnstable)
- Nagog Woods, Massachusetts (Acton)
- Nobscot (Framingham)
- Keephikkon (Chilmark)
- Jamaica Plain (possibly; Boston)
- Mattapan (Boston)
- Mishamet (Dartmouth)
- Mishawum (Woburn)
- Monatiquot (Braintree)
- Nonantum (Newton)
- Onset (Wareham)
- Shawsheen (Andover)
- Siasconset (Nantucket)
- Sippecan (Marion)
- Sippewisset (Falmouth)
- Succonesset (Mashpee)
- Pawtucket (Lowell)
- Pocasset, Massachusetts (Bourne)
- Pocasset (Tiverton, Rhode Island, and Fall River, Massachusetts)
- Popponesset, Massachusetts (Mashpee)
- Teaticket, Massachusetts (Falmouth)
- Waban (Newton)
- Wamesit (Lowell)
- Waquoit (Falmouth)
- Watuppa (Fall River)
- Weweantic, Massachusetts (Wareham)
- Winheconnet (Norton)

==== Islands ====
- Abencotants
- Anuxanon
- Big Quamino Rock
- Cataumet Rock
- Chappaquiddick
- Cuttyhunk
- Monomoy
- Muskeget
- Nashawena
- Naushon
- Nonamessest
- Tuckernuck
- Uncatena
- Weepecket

==== Lakes and ponds ====
- Chebacco Lake
- Lake Cochichewick
- Hocomonco Pond
- Lake Quannapowitt
- Maquan Pond
- Monponsett Pond
- Lake Nippenicket
- Pocksha Pond
- Snipatuit Pond
- Tihonet Pond
- Tispaquin Pond
- Winnecunnet Pond

==== Rivers ====
- Annisquam River
- Assabet River
- Assonet River
- Cocasset River
- Cochato River
- Cochichewick River
- Coonamesset River
- Copicut River
- Kickemuit River
- Mashpee River
- Monatiquot River
- Mystic River
- Nasketucket River
- Neponset River
- Pamet River
- Paskamanset River
- Pocasset River
- Powwow River
- Quashnet River
- Quequechan River
- Santuit River
- Saugus River
- Satucket River
- Segreganset River
- Shumatuscacant River
- Shawsheen River
- Seapit River
- Sippican River
- Spicket River
- Tiasquam River
- Wankinco River
- Weweantic River
- Winnetuxet River

== Bibliography ==
- Little Doe Fermino, Jessie (2000). An Introduction to Wampanoag Grammar (MS thesis). Massachusetts Institute of Technology. hdl:1721.1/8740.
- Goddard, Ives (1978). "Eastern Algonquian Languages". In Trigger, Bruce G. (ed.). Handbook of North American Indians. Vol. 15: Northeast. Washington, DC: The Smithsonian Institution. pp. 70–77. ISBN 978-0-16-004575-2.
- Goddard, Ives; Bragdon, Kathleen J., eds. (1989). Native Writings in Massachusett. Philadelphia: American Philosophical Society. ISBN 0-87169-185-X.
- Moondancer; Strong Woman (2007). A Cultural History of the Native Peoples of Southern New England: Voices from Past and Present. Boulder, CO: Bauu Press. ISBN 978-0-9721349-3-4.
- Walker, Willard B. (1997). "Native Writing Systems". In Goddard, Ives (ed.). Handbook of North American Indians. Vol. 17: Languages. Washington, DC: The Smithsonian Institution. pp. 158–184. ISBN 978-0-87474-197-1.
