= Massachusett Pidgin English =

English-based contact language

- Native to: United States
- Region: New England and Long Island, particularly eastern Massachusetts.
- Ethnicity: Massachusett, Wôpanâak (Wampanoag), Pawtucket, Coweset, Nauset, other Algonquian peoples of New England and Long Island, English (ancestors of New England Yankees)
- Extinct: early 19th century
- Language family: English: English Creole; Atlantic; (Significant lexical and grammatical influences from Massachusett via Massachusett Pidgin); Massachusett Pidgin English

Language codes
- ISO 639-3: None (mis)
- IETF: cpe-u-sd-usma
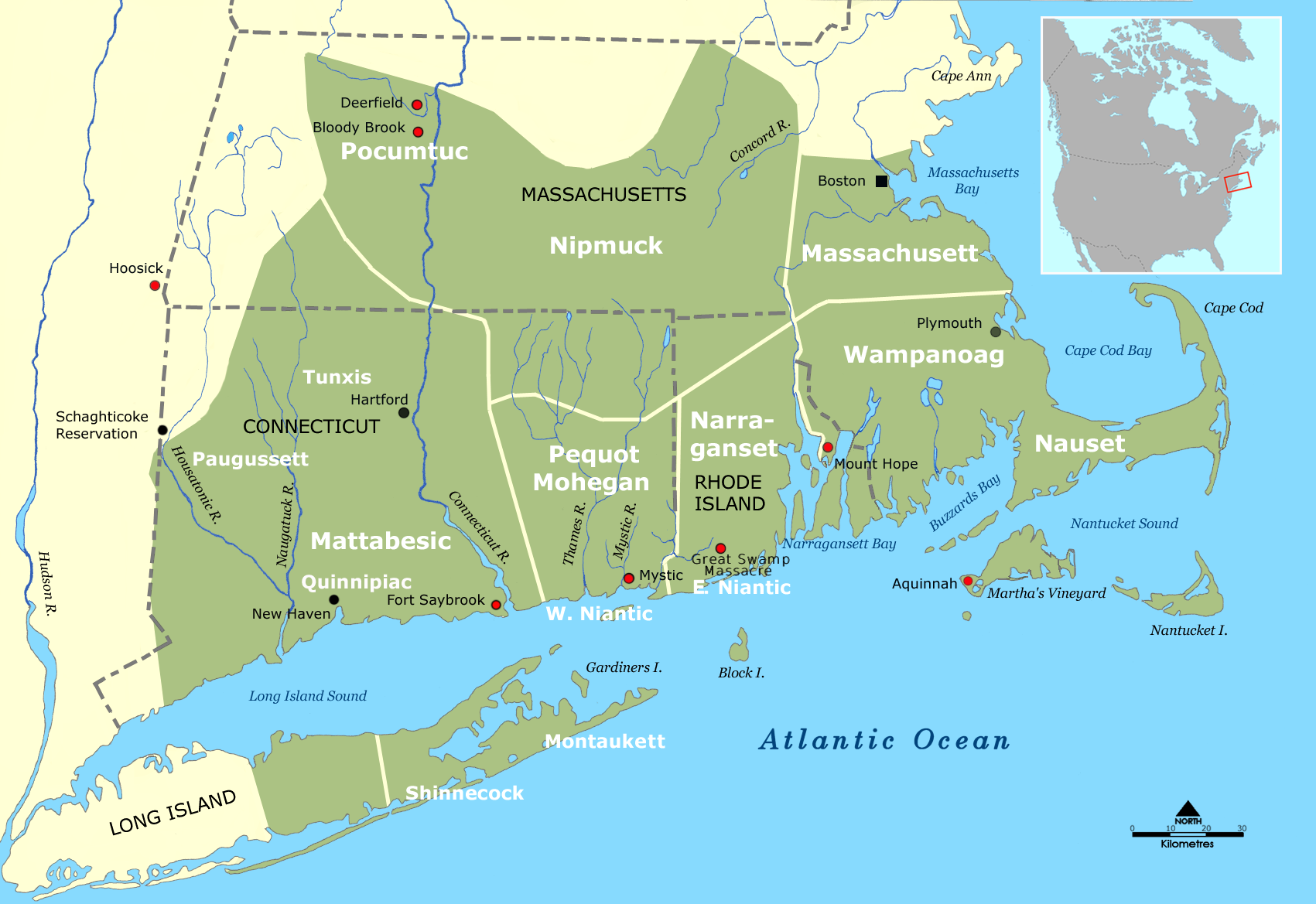
- The location of the Massachusett/Wampanoag tribe and their neighbors, c. 1600

Massachusett Pidgin English was an English-based contact language that had developed in early seventeenth century New England and Long Island as a medium of communication between the Native speakers of Algonquian languages and the English settlers that began to settle the coastal areas in 1620s. The use of Massachusett Pidgin English co-existed in Massachusett-speaking communities with their original dialects as well as Massachusett Pidgin, another contact language that was Massachusett-based. Unlike Massachusett Pidgin, which was confused with the Massachusett language by the English colonists, attestations of Massachusett Pidgin English are quite numerous. As few of the colonists were able to or willing to master either Massachusett or its Pidgin variety, those that traded and lived directly next to Indian villages communicated in Massachusett Pidgin English. The use of Massachusett Pidgin English supplanted the use of Massachusett Pidgin and likely even overtook the native language in community. In a process likely to decreolization, the speakers of Massachusett Pidgin English began to adjust their language to the English of their neighbors, and since the nineteenth century, all the descendants of the Massachusett-speaking peoples have been monolingual English speakers.

Massachusett Pidgin English and Massachusett Pidgin are of special interest to scholars of the English language as it seems that these two languages were the vectors of transmission of Algonquian loan words into the English language. The English settlers of New England called the specialized Indian vocabulary 'wigwam words,' after wigwam, the Massachusett Pidgin and Massachusett Pidgin English term for 'house' or 'home' instead of the Massachusett term wetu (weetyuw). Unfortunately, as the English settlers and their descendants pushed westward, they retained elements of Massachusett Pidgin English, especially vocabulary, in dealings with other tribes, and many of the words used innocently by the Pilgrims and Puritans of New England, such as 'squaw,' 'sannup,' 'wampum' and 'peace pipe,' are viewed by most Native peoples today as pejorative, racist insults due to their use by the English settlers and pioneers, and use of these terms by White teachers in Native American public schools is believed to be one reason for the high dropout rates of Native students in U.S. schools.

== History ==
=== English contacts prior to 1620 ===
The Pilgrim settlers were shocked to be greeted in English by Samoset with a 'Hello, Englishmen!' A visiting sachem from Monhegan Island, Samoset would later introduce Pilgrim settlers to Squanto who was even more fluent in English. Squanto would later aid the Pilgrims as an important middleman in relations with the Wampanoag tribes around them, such as that of Massasoit, but also taught them how to survive by teaching them local agricultural practices. Only a handful of visits by the settlers are recorded. Bartholomew Gosnold established a short-lived trading post on Cuttyhunk Island in 1602. John Smith mapped the region in 1612, and stopped in several Massachusett and Wampanoag villages to trade for supplies and meet the local leaders. In 1607, the Popham Colony was established, but abandoned after a year due to infighting between political factions.

Encounters were definitely more frequent than previously thought. English fishermen began setting up camps onshore in Newfoundland in 1520, and may have ventured further south to partake of the rich bounty of cod. Samoset's encounters with English fishermen on his home island were frequent enough that he was able to recount the names of several captains and their crewmen. Both Squanto and the Nauset sachem Epenow were abducted from the coast by European merchant ships and sold into slavery in Spain. However, both Squanto and Epenow managed to escape by finding work as interpreters on vessels trading along the coast until they found their way home and could reunite with their kinsmen or join other tribes. The Native American presence in Europe was so prevalent that William Shakespeare references it in The Tempest, where he writes, 'Any strange beast makes a man [prosperous], they will not give a doit to relieve a lame beggar, [but] they will give ten [pence] to see a dead Indian.' Local Native Americans explained the practise to the Pilgrims, when several locals, including an aged woman, recounted their sufferings to the Pilgrims with Samoset and Squanto translating. Details of these recollections were later written down by the Pilgrims themselves.

== Features ==
=== Massachusett Pidgin loan words ===
The majority of terms were taken from the English language. However, numerous terms were taken from the local Algonquian languages, usually via Massachusett Pidgin, to describe Indian culture, technology and material culture and local plant and animal terms. Most of these words come from Massachusett, although some words were either archaic retentions or cognate borrowings from Narragansett or the Abenakian languages, all of which were closely related. In many ways, Massachusett Pidgin English seems to be Massachusett Pidgin relexified with English words.

- netop, 'friend,' from Massachusett nétop (neetôp) /niːtãp/, 'my friend.'
- wigwam, 'house' or 'home.' Possibly Abenakian, cf. Western Abenaki wigw8m /wiːkwãm/. Massachusett form is wetu (weetyuw) /wiːtʲəw/. Pidgin form probably pronounced as *(weekuwôm) /wiːkəwãm/. Possibly an archaic retention, both wigwam and wetu derive from Proto-Algonquian *wiᐧkiwaᐧhmi Although wetu was also known, wigwam won as the general word and one that still has currency.
- sagamore, 'chief' or 'leader.' Possibly Abenakian, cf. Western Abenaki s8gm8 /sãgmã/. Massachusett Pidgin form, pronounced like *(sôkumô) /sãkəmã/, contrasts with Massachusett form is sachem (sôtyum). Both sagamore and sachem derive from Proto-Algonquian *saᐧkimaᐧwa
- squaw-sachem, 'queen,' 'female chief,' 'wife of chief,' from Massachusett squa (sqâ) and sachem (sôtyum) /sãtʲəm/, 'chief.' Proper Massachusett term is sunk-squa (sôkusqâ) /sãkəskʷaː/, 'queen,' 'female chief' or 'wife of chief,' literally 'leaderwoman.'
- wunnekin, 'good,' from Massachusett wunnégen (wuneekun) /wəniːkən/, 'it is good.'
- pappoose, 'baby.' Possibly from Narragansett pappoòs. Massachusett form is papeiss (pâpeewees}) /paːpiːwiːs/}. Compare Mohegan-Pequot pápohs /paːpuːhs/.
- nux, 'yes,' from Massachusett nukkies (nukees) /nəkiːs/, 'yes.'

=== Calques ===
Several expressions in Massachusett Pidgin English were calques of expressions and words from Massachusett or Massachusett Pigdin English. Calques are words that are semantic translations of expressions from other languages, or words that are borrowed but influenced by the variant usages in the other language.

- big to mean 'big,' 'large,' 'grand' and 'sacred,' same as the meanings of Massachusett miss (muhs) /məhs/.
- firewater, although attested later, likely influenced by Massachusett and several Algonquian languages of the expression 'water that causes suffering' or 'sickening water,' such as Massachusett onkuppe (ôhkupee) /ãhkəpiː/.
- string of wampum, from Massachusett wampumpeag, wampumpeage (wôpôpeeak) /wãpãpiːak/, 'strung white beads' or 'strings of white beads.' The colonists mistakenly thought the strung beads of wampum were currency. Shortened to wampum *(wôpôp) and peag *(peeak) in usage by the English.
- bury the hatchet, 'to make peace' or 'to withdraw a grudge,' attested in the eighteenth century, but referenced as a custom in colonial New England, where leaders of tribes would literally bury their weapons as a symbol of peace after agreements.
- all one this, from Massachusett Pidgin tatapa you, 'the same as this,' from Massachusett tatapa yeu (tâtapaw y8) /taːtapaːw juː/, 'it is similar (to something) this (thing)' or 'the same as this.' Cf. Massachusett tatapéyeu (tâtapeeyuw) /taːtapiːjəw/, 'it is alike.'
- 'me' for English 'I,' 'me,' 'my' and 'mine' and 'you' for English 'your,' 'yours' similar to the function of neen (neen) /nn/, first person pronoun, and keen (keen) /kn/, singular second person pronoun, in Massachusett.
- 'no' for English 'no' or 'not,' similar to the function of matta (mata) /mata/, negative particle, in Massachusett.

=== Massachusett phonology ===
As Massachusett Pidgin English was often spoken by peoples who spoke Massachusett or closely related languages, the influences of their native languages in pronunciation must have been substantial. It is believed that most Indians pronounced English words either as close to English as possible, such as those that interacted frequently with English speakers or for the many women and children that worked as indentured servants in the households of English settlers. Others likely substituted the closest approximate Algonquian phonology to approximate the sounds. Massachusett lacked /b/, /d/, /f/, /ɡ/, /dʒ/, /ʒ/, /θ/, /ð/ and /ŋ/ and the distinction between voiced and unvoiced consonants and permitted far fewer consonant clusters than English.

Evidence of this pronunciation interference includes different spellings of English loan words in the Massachusett documents, such as the English word 'Frenchmen' which was rendered as borrowed frenchmensog, possibly /ˈfrentʃ.mənsak/ with English-influenced pronunciation by proficient speakers, or also attested panachmonog possibly /pənãtʃmənak/ indicating influence of Massachusett phonology. A similar process occurs in Malaysian Malay, where the Arabic loanword redha is pronounced as /reðɑ/ in imitation of Classical Arabic /riðaː/ if one is educated or have familiarity with Arabic as opposed to the general pronunciation of /rələ/. Similarly, English speakers from the Commonwealth countries pronounce the French borrowing penchant as /ˈpɒ̃ʃɒ̃/, as opposed to the nativized pronunciation preferred in the U.S., /ˈpɛntʃənt/.

Two English phonemes, /r/ and /l/, were either dropped or replaced by /n/ in loan words that were adopted into Massachusett. Although this is not always shown in the documents recording Massachusett Pidgin English written by the colonists, spelling in Massachusett documents by the Indians show that words with 'r' and 'l' were replaced by 'n' due to influence of language development. Proto-Eastern Algonquian reflexes of *r were unstable in the development of Massachusett. For example, the word for 'dog' in Massachusett is annum (anum) but is alum in Nipmuc and arum in Quiripi. Similarly, the word 'share' and 'apple' often appear in Massachusett-language documents as shaan and appen, indicative of Southern New England Algonquian N-dialect interference.
