= Jessie Little Doe Baird =

Native American linguist

- Born: November 18, 1963 (age 63); Wareham, Massachusetts, United States
- Citizenship: Mashpee Wampanoag Tribe and U.S.
- Education: Massachusetts Institute of Technology
- Occupation: Linguist
- Known for: Revitalization of Wôpanâak language
- Awards: MacArthur Fellowship

Jessie Little Doe Baird (also Jessie Little Doe Fermino, born 18 November 1963) is a linguist known for her efforts to revive the Wampanoag (Wôpanâak) language. She is the co-founder of the Wôpanâak Language Reclamation Project (WLRP).

She lives in Mashpee, Massachusetts.

== Background ==
In 1992 or 1993, Baird experienced many dreams that she believed to be visions of her ancestors meeting her and speaking in their language, which she did not understand at first. According to a prophecy of her Wampanoag community, a woman of their kind would leave her home to bring back their language and "the children of those who had had a hand in breaking the language cycle would help heal it." These legends and visions were big motivators for Jessie to start teaching and working towards recovering Wôpanâak language and culture. She began raising funds for this project along with teaching the Wôpanâak language at tribal sites in Mashpee and Aquinnah.

Baird modeled her program after the Hawaiian immersion school system, which was implemented in Hawaii to help revitalize Hawaii's language and culture. This system starts with a master speaker, who works with other adult apprentices individually or a small group of people. They work intensively for 20 - 30 hours per week to master the language under a certain time period. Once those people have learned the language, they go on to teach younger, more inexperienced people so the language can be spread. Implementing this system allowed the WLRP to begin rekindling the Wampanoag language. As of 2025, more than 500 people have taken her Wôpanâak classes, ranging from preschoolers to "master apprentice" level.

== Education, database and dictionary ==
Baird studied for a master's degree at Massachusetts Institute of Technology, where she studied with linguist Dr. Kenneth L. Hale, who was a scholar of indigenous languages. Together they worked on deciphering grammatical patterns and depicted vocabulary lists from archival Wôpanâak documents. They collaborated to create a language database based on official written records, government correspondences and religious texts, an example being a 1663 Bible printed by Puritan minister John Eliot kept in the archives of MIT.

This led Baird and Hale to begin compiling a Wôpanâak-English dictionary in 1996, with more than 10,000 words. This is still being updated and added to by Baird to help her students, historians and other linguists interested in learning the Wôpanâak language.

== Advocacy and public service ==
Jessie Little Doe Baird set up the Wôpanâak Language Reclamation Project to revitalize the Wampanoag language. The project helped the Mashpee Wampanoag to create a language immersion school.

Baird and her work on Wôpanâak language reconstruction and revival are the subject of a PBS documentary, We Still Live Here: Âs Nutayuneân, directed by Anne Makepeace. The film goes over the story of how the Wôpanâak language was revived. It also goes into Wôpanâak history, how their land was taken from them, and other hardships that these people have faced.

Baird is the vice-chairwoman of the Mashpee Wampanoag Indian Tribal Council.

== Awards and honors ==
She received a MacArthur Fellowship in 2010. A week after receiving this award, "the tribe’s language project received a federal grant to implement a master-apprentice program with Jessie as the master speaker to three full-time language apprentices, Nitana Hicks, Tracy Kelly, and Melanie Roderick, who share her long-term commitment to opening a tribal charter school."

In 2017, Jessie Little Doe Baird received an honorary doctorate in social sciences from Yale University.

In 2020, Baird was named one of USA Today's "Women of the Century" for her work in reviving the Wampanoag language.
