= Massachusett Pidgin =

Massachusett-based pidgin

Pidgin Massachusett
- Massachusett Jargon
- Region: New England and Long Island, particularly eastern Massachusetts.
- Era: 17th century. Extinct early 18th century.
- Language family: Massachusett-based pidgin

Language codes
- ISO 639-3: None (mis)
- Glottolog: None
- IETF: crp-u-sd-usma

Massachusett Pidgin or Massachusett Jargon was a contact pidgin or auxiliary language derived from the Massachusett language attested in the earliest colonial records up until the mid-eighteenth century. Little is known about the language, but it shared a much simplified grammatical system, with many features similar to the better attested Delaware Jargon spoken in the nearby Hudson and Delaware watersheds. It was mutually intelligible with the other Southern New England Algonquian languages.

== History ==
=== Development ===
Massachusett Pidgin is recorded as early as 1624, when references to it appear in the colonial records. With exception of Mobilian Jargon, most of the auxiliary languages that developed in North America are thought to have been brought about by contact with Europeans. There are several factors in place that make it very likely that the language pre-dated European arrival. The Massachusett people were once a numerically dominant people of the region, with a large population supported by the fertile lands of the coastal plain and ample access to riparian and ocean food resources. With a strong population, the Massachusett sachems were head of a loose alliance of peoples, covering all the Massachusett-speaking peoples, the Nipmuc and even the unclassified peoples of the Pioneer Valley before their numbers were felled by the leptospirosis outbreak circa 1619 and subsequent virgin soil epidemics and the large numbers of English colonists that usurped their land and competed with them for resources.

Massachusett was spoken by several peoples, including not only the Massachusett, but also the Pawtucket, Wampanoag, Nauset and Coweset peoples. It was mutually intelligible with the other Southern New England Algonquian languages (SNEA), spoken in southern New England and parts of Long Island, and related to but not mutually intelligible with the Abenakian languages spoken to the north and the Delawaran languages to the west and southwest of the SNEA region.

Massachusett Pidgin and Massachusett Pidgin English are of interest to scholars of the English language and language contact, as most of the Algonquian loan words adopted from the peoples of New England were adopted through these languages and not directly from Massachusett.

=== Colonial attestation ===
The existence of Massachusett Pidgin is only inferred from colonial sources. Edward Winslow, who served as governor of the Plymouth Colony, had developed a close relationship with the Wampanoag sachem Massasoit and other local Wampanoag leaders and was one of a handful of the Pilgrims that had any command of the local 'Indian language.' In Winslow's 1624 publication Good News from New England, he describes a situation where his party of Pilgrim men came across some Wampanoag men they knew and were able to communicate, but when the Wampanoag spoke to each other, it was incomprehensible.

Winslow later on recalls the visit of the Massachusett sachem Chickatawbut. After exchanging pleasantries with the Winslow and the other representatives of the Plymouth Colony, the conversation between the sachems was not understood by Winslow save a few words. Similar accounts are recorded by the Dutch and Swedish colonists of what is now the Mid-Atlantic States and the traditional homeland of the Lenape peoples. Like Winslow, the Dutch and Swedish settlers thought they were speaking the local language, but were actually speaking pidgin varieties thereof.

Massachusett Pidgin spread with the fur trade, allowing Indians to communicate with northern and interior tribes and exchange items for beaver pelts, which were highly prized by the English settlers. As beaver became scarce in southern New England, the Indian traders and hunters had to trek further to obtain the desired pelts, likely taking the easy to learn and somewhat intelligible Massachusett Pidgin.

As the English settlers were not interested in learning the local language, and the Indians, outnumbered by English settlers, needed English to trade and participate in wider society, switched over to Massachusett Pidgin English, essentially Massachusett Pidgin with heavy English relexification. The Native peoples of New England continued to use their local dialect or language such as Massachusett, Massachusett Pidgin and Massachusett Pidgin English to communicate. Dual use of these by the Native peoples is recorded as early as 1651 in Connecticut, where trade was conducted on English colonial merchantmen with Indian interpreters possibly code-switching between Massachusett Pidgin and Massachusett Pidgin. Similarly, a court trial involving an Indian accused of stealing a hog was shown a hog's head and told tatapa you (tâtapaw y8) /taːtapaːw juː/, 'similar to this,' and in Massachusett Pidgin 'all one this' in Massachusett Pidgin English in 1704.

=== Decline ===
The Massachusett speaking peoples also adopted English, albeit imperfectly with heavy influences of Massachusett grammar and some vocabulary. The use of the Massachusett language declined in Massachusett communities in the 1750s and the 1770s in the Wampanoag communities as Massachusett Pidgin English, and later English, began to overtake the Native languages. This was part due to assimilation pressures and increased rates of intermarriage with Blacks and Whites outside the speech community.

This co-existed with the usage of Massachusett Pidgin, but as English became more and more necessary to trade and participate in society, and the new settlers were less eager to bother to learn the 'Indian language,' Massachusett Pidgin was rapidly eclipsed by the sole use of Massachusett Pidgin English.

Massachusett Pidgin may have influenced the late-stage of the Massachusett language, and many of the small number of words recorded by Speck when he visited the elderly members of the Mashpee Wampanoag tribe in the 1920s, many were actually Massachusett Pidgin derivations. The Massachusett language went extinct at the end of the nineteenth century, with the death of the last native speakers of Aquinnah, but the language had already declined as the primary language of the Indian communities in the 1770s.

== Lexicon ==
=== Massachusett ===
Most of the vocabulary is drawn from the Massachusett language, although Massachusett Pidgin does feature some shortened expressions and word compounds that would not be permissible in the normal spoken language. As the majority of the lexicon is derived from Massachusett, it is assumed that speakers, especially the Natives themselves, pronounced the words according to the rules of Massachusett phonology.

- neen, 'I' or 'me,' from Massachusett neen (neen) /niːn/, 'I' or 'me.'
- nux, 'yes,' from Massachusett nukkies (nukees) /nəkiːs/, 'yes.'
- squaw, 'woman' or 'female,' from Massachusett squa (sqâ) /skʷaː/, 'woman' or 'female.'
- matta, 'no' or 'not,' from Massachusett matta (mata) /mata/, 'no' or 'not.'
- tatapa you, 'the same as this,' from Massachusett tatapa yeu (tâtapaw y8) /taːtapaːw juː/, 'it is similar (to something) this (thing)' or 'the same as this.' Cf. Massachusett tatapéyeu (tâtapeeyuw) /taːtapiːjəw/, 'it is alike.'
- tatta, 'I do not know' or 'I do not have,' likely from Massachusett tatta(tatâh), itself a reduplication of toh (tah), a particle used to indicate the optative, or 'wishing,' mood or doubt.
- nocake, 'parched cornmeal,' from Massachusett nꝏhkik (n8hkuheek) /nuːhkəhiːk/, '(cornmeal) that which is softened.'
- squaw-sachem, 'queen,' 'female chief,' 'wife of chief,' from Massachusett squa (sqâ) and sachem (sôtyum) /sãtʲəm/, 'chief.' Proper Massachusett term is sunk-squa (sôkusqâ) /sãkəskʷaː/, 'queen,' 'female chief' or 'wife of chief,' literally 'leaderwoman.'
- netop, 'friend,' from Massachusett nétop (neetôp) /niːtãp/, 'my friend.'
- wunnekin, 'good,' from Massachusett wunnégen (wuneekun) /wəniːkən/, 'it is good.'
- wampumpeag, 'money,' from Massachusett wampumpeage (wôpôpeeak) /wãpãpiːak/, 'white shell beads.' The colonists mistakenly thought the strung beads of wampum were currency. Shortened to wampum *(wôpôp) and peag *(peeak) in usage by the English settlers.

=== Other Algonquian ===
A handful of common words were either borrowings from other Algonquian languages or were archaic retentions that were better understood by other peoples. For instance, although the Massachusett Pidgin sanomp is also found in the Massachusett-language documents, it was likely a Massachusett Pidgin borrowing from an Abenakian language, and appears as zan8mba in Western Abenaki.

- wigwam, 'house' or 'home.' Possibly Abenakian, cf. Western Abenaki wigw8m /wiːkwãm/. Massachusett form is wetu (weetyuw) /wiːtʲəw/. Pidgin form probably pronounced as *(weekuwôm) /wiːkəwãm/. Possibly an archaic retention, both wigwam and wetu derive from Proto-Algonquian *wiᐧkiwaᐧhmi Although wetu was also known, wigwam won as the general word and one that still has currency.
- sanomp, 'man' or 'married man.' Possibly Abenakian, cf. Western Abenaki zan8mba /sanãpa/. Although occurs in Massachusett as sannomp (sanôp), it is rare compared to more common wasketop (waskeetôp) /waskiːtãp/, 'man.'
- sagamore, 'chief' or 'leader.' Possibly Abenakian, cf. Western Abenaki s8gm8 /sãgmã/. Massachusett Pidgin form, pronounced like *(sôkumô) /sãkəmã/, contrasts with Massachusett form is sachem (sôtyum). Both sagamore and sachem derive from Proto-Algonquian *saᐧkimaᐧwa
- pappoose, 'baby.' Possibly from Narragansett pappoòs. Massachusett form is papeiss (pâpeewees}) /paːpiːwiːs/}. Compare Mohegan-Pequot pápohs /paːpuːhs/.

=== English ===
As Massachusett Pidgin was often used to communicate with the English settlers, it naturally incorporated numerous English terms. Hundreds of words were adopted into Massachusett from English, mainly for the new crops, domesticated animals, tools, material culture and religion of the English settlers. Many items of the English quickly became prized items of trade. Although it is uncertain to what extant these words were used in Massachusett Pidgin, the words listed below were known to have been absorbed into the Massachusett language. Due to the reduced phonemic inventory of Massachusett, most words were approximated to their closest Massachusett equivalent sounds. English /r/ and /l/ were often replaced by /n/ due to interference from N-SNEA dialect pronunciation, as Massachusett speakers were familiar with neighboring languages where cognate words with /r/ and /l/ became /n/ in Massachusett. As consonant clusters were limited, an epenthetic vowel was often inserted to ease pronunciation. English words were also overtly marked with the Massachusett declensional pronoun and verb conjugation system, producing hybrid forms.

- pigsack, 'pigs,' from English 'pigs' (pl) and Massachusett animate plural -ack (-ak) /ak/. Possibly pronounced */piːksak/ or */pəksak/.
- coneeko, 'calico cloth,' from English 'calico.'
- applesank, 'apple tree,' from English 'apples' (pl) and Massachusett ank (-ôhq) /ãhk/, 'tree.' Possibly pronounced */apənsãhk/.
- nukohtumun, 'we (exclusive) hold court,' from English 'court' and Massachusett nu..umun (nu...umun). Possibly pronounced */nəkahtəmən/.
- moneyash, 'money,' from English 'money' and Massachusett inanimate plural ash (-ash) /aʃ/. Possibly pronounced */maniːaʃ/.
- Frenchmensog, 'Frenchmen,' from hypercorrected plural of English 'Frenchmen' and Massachusett animate plural. Possibly pronounced as */panatʃ[ə]mənsak/, from variant spelling panachmansog.

== Grammatical features ==
Like Pidgin Delaware, verbs in Massachusett are simplified into the inanimate forms. For example, Massasoit is believed to have said to Winslow upon his deathbed, Matta neen wonckanet namen Winsnow (Mata neen wôkanut nâmun Winsnow), 'Oh Winslow, I shall never see thee again' but more literally 'Not I again see Winslow.' In standard Massachusett, the expected verb would be nunau (nunâw) /nənaːw/, a transitive animate verb, 'I see (someone)' or more direct (kunâwush) /kənaːwəʃ/, 'I see you,' as opposed to nâmun (nâmun) /naːmən/, the transitive inanimate 'see it.' The simplification of all the verbs to inanimate forms necessitated the need of pronouns to clarify meaning as opposed to the standard Algonquian languages which are pro-drop due to the pronominal information encoded in the verb declension.
