= The Tarratine Wars =

The Tarratine War
- Part of the American Indian Wars
Date	1607–1631
Location	New England
Result	Indecisive

Belligerents
Penobscot; Kennebec; Abenaki; Pawtucket	Tarratine; Mi'kmaq; Etechemin; Maliseet

Commanders and leaders
Bashaba †; Marchin †; Onmechin †; Nanepashemet †	Henri Membertou

Strength
Unknown	Unknown

Casualties and losses
Thousands	Unknown

The Tarratine Wars, also known as the Penobscot–Tarrantine War or Micmac Wars, was an armed conflict that sporadically occurred over a period of 25 years between the Mi'Kmaq confederacy and the members and allies of the Abenaki confederacy.

== Background ==
The arrival of the French and the subsequent creation of the fur trade created a crisis among indigenous nations across the northeast. The introduction of firearms to tribes allied with European powers brought with it a major power imbalance, as tribes which were able to secure arms soon found themselves with a great technological and military advantage against their neighbors. This coupled with a gradual scarcity of wild animals due to the fur trade caused a number of territorial disputes that escalated into intertribal violence.

== The War ==
In 1606, Marc Lescarbot and explorer Samuel de Champlain wrote how the Mi'kmaq sakmow (Grand Chief) Membertou held a funeral for his son-in-law Panoniac, a Mi'kmaw sakmow who had been killed by a member of the Passamaquoddy tribe. Seeking revenge for this and other acts of hostility, Membertou led 500 warriors in a raid on the Passamaquoddy town, Chouacoet, present-day Saco, Maine, in July, 1607, killing 20 of their warriors, including two of their leaders, Onmechin and Marchin.

In the aftermath of the attack, the Wawenock band of the Abenaki began construction of a fortress at Mecadacut, near Penobscot Bay facing the Tarratine, who were a warlike band of the Mi'kmaq with a reputation for banditry. Eventually a member tribe of the Abenaki Confederacy known as the Etechemin attempted to seek the support of the Tarratine in their bid to gain independence from the Abenaki, which reignited the war.

Violence resumed again in spring of 1615 as the Penobscots raided a Tarratine town and killed a number of men while taking women and children back as prisoners. The Tarratines soon retaliated by attacking the main village of the Penobscots in a sneak attack where they killed the Bashebe (Great Sachem) along with his family, chief warriors and ministers, the death of the Great Sachem led to a state of anarchy and civil war where prominent Sagamores fought each other to try and claim the title of Bashebe, meanwhile the Tarratine continued with their campaign and raided most of the villages around the Penobscot River.

Hoping to aid his ally, Nanepashemet sent warriors in to assist the Penobscot in repelling the invaders. The Pawtucket warriors were victorious in the few battles they had with the Tarratines and returned with Tarratine captives. The Pawtucket participation in the war later led to retaliatory raids by the Tarrrantines who traveled to Massachusetts and attacked the Pawtucket and Agawam in their homelands. In response, Nanepashemet constructed a number of defensive forts. The Tarratine sent 300 warriors to find and kill Nanepashemet. By 1619, the Tarratine discovered his whereabouts, laid siege to the fort and ultimately killed Nanepashemet. Two years later, a party from the Plymouth Colony including Edward Winslow came across his fort and grave.

The Tarrrantine arrival in Massachusetts exposed the group to the 1616-1619 epidemic known as the, "Great Dying" which had been sweeping through southern New England and had killed 90% of its population. Upon their return to Maine the warriors brought this disease back to their tribe, which resulted in the death of three fourths of the Mi'kmaq. The loss of so much of their population halted the continuation of Tarratine hostilities and essentially ended the war.

Sporadic Tarratine attacks continued until 1631, with the last reported instance of violence from August 8, 1631, stating, "The Tarentines, to the number of one hundred, came in three canoes, and in the night assaulted the wigwam of the sagamore of Agawam, by Merimack, and slew seven men, and wounded John Sagamore, and James, and some others, (whereof some died after,) and rifled a wigwam where Mr. Cradock's men kept to catch sturgeon, took away their nets and biscuit, etc."

== Aftermath ==
In 1617, the Wawenock band of the Abenaki made peace with the Tarratine. Though they never fully recovered from the war.
