= Tihonet Pond =

Lake of the United States of America

- Location within Massachusetts
- Location: Wareham, Massachusetts
- Coordinates: 41°47′25″N 70°42′56″W
- Primary inflows: Wankinco River
- Primary outflows: Wankinco River
- Basin countries: United States
- Surface area: 89 acres (36 ha)
- Settlements: Tihonet

Tihonet Pond is an 89-acre (360,000 m^{2}) pond in Wareham, Massachusetts. The Wankinco River flows through the pond. Tihonet village lies on the southern shore of the pond.

- Environmental Protection Agency
