= Indian Primer =

The Indian Primer (1669), fully The Indian primer, or, The way of training up of our Indian youth in the good knowledge of God, in the knowledge of the Scriptures and in an ability to read, was a reading primer in Eastern Algonquian commissioned for printing in New England by the English missionary John Eliot. First appearing six years after the completion of the Eliot Indian Bible, it was intended to assist in Puritan efforts to convert the Native Americans to Christianity. The Indian Primer was created within a Protestant tradition of didactic prayer books.

It preceded the The New England Primer, a reading primer designed for English-speaking colonists, which is believed to have first appeared in the 1680s.

== Contents ==
The Indian Primer begins with a translation into Algonquian of verse 6 of chapter 22 of the biblical Book of Proverbs, which in the King James Version of the verse reads:

Train up a child in the way he should go: and when he is old, he will not depart from it

For Dan Mills, "the appropriation of an Old Testament verse from the book of Proverbs reminds those able to read Algonquin that Native Americans were children to be instructed in proper behavior and controlled by Puritanical norms."

The Indian Primer then introduces the Latin script in black letter and upper and lower cases, letter combinations intended to teach pronunciation by syllable, and gives a translation of the Lord's Prayer, translated in a way that gives each English word a direct translation. This is followed by the Apostles' Creed in English, then "The Large Catechism" in Algonquian, which, according to Dan Mills, is likely based on Martin Luther's Der Große Katechismus, which includes the Ten Commandments, the Apostles' Creed, the Lord's Prayer, Holy Baptism, and the Sacrament of the Eucharist. After "The Large Catechism", there is a "Short Catechism" of three pages, likely referring to the 1646–47 Westminster Shorter Catechism which takes a question-and-answer form.
