= Holly Marsh =

Marshland in Massachusetts, US

Coordinates: 41°35′05″N 70°27′55″W

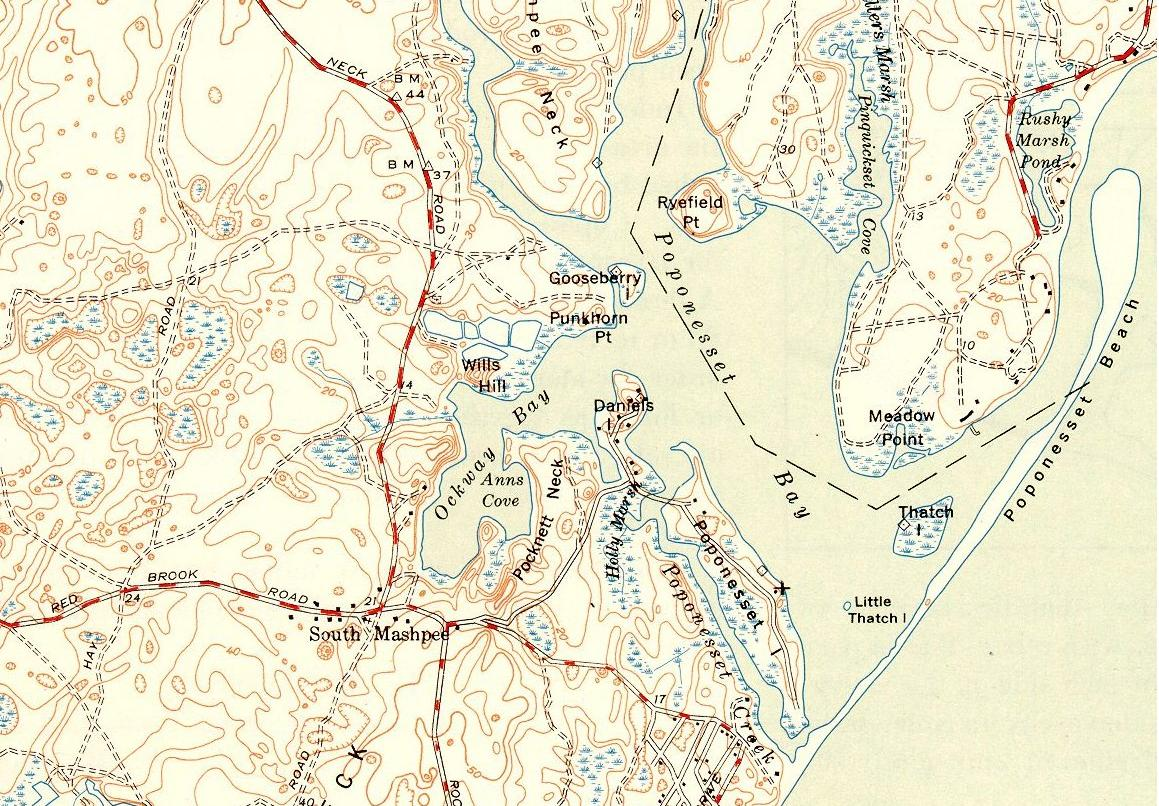
The Popponesset Bay System

Holly Marsh is a small saltwater marshland in Mashpee, Massachusetts on the shores of Popponesset Bay, Cape Cod.

The marsh starts at Daniel's Island (actually a peninsula) and extends down both the mainland side and the Popponesset Island side of the Popponesset Creek.

== Other uses ==
Mount Holly Marsh Preserve is a wetland near Mount Holly Springs, Pennsylvania. It is part of the Mount Holly Preserve and is maintained by the Nature Conservancy.
