= Popponesset Creek =

Waterway in Massachusetts, United States

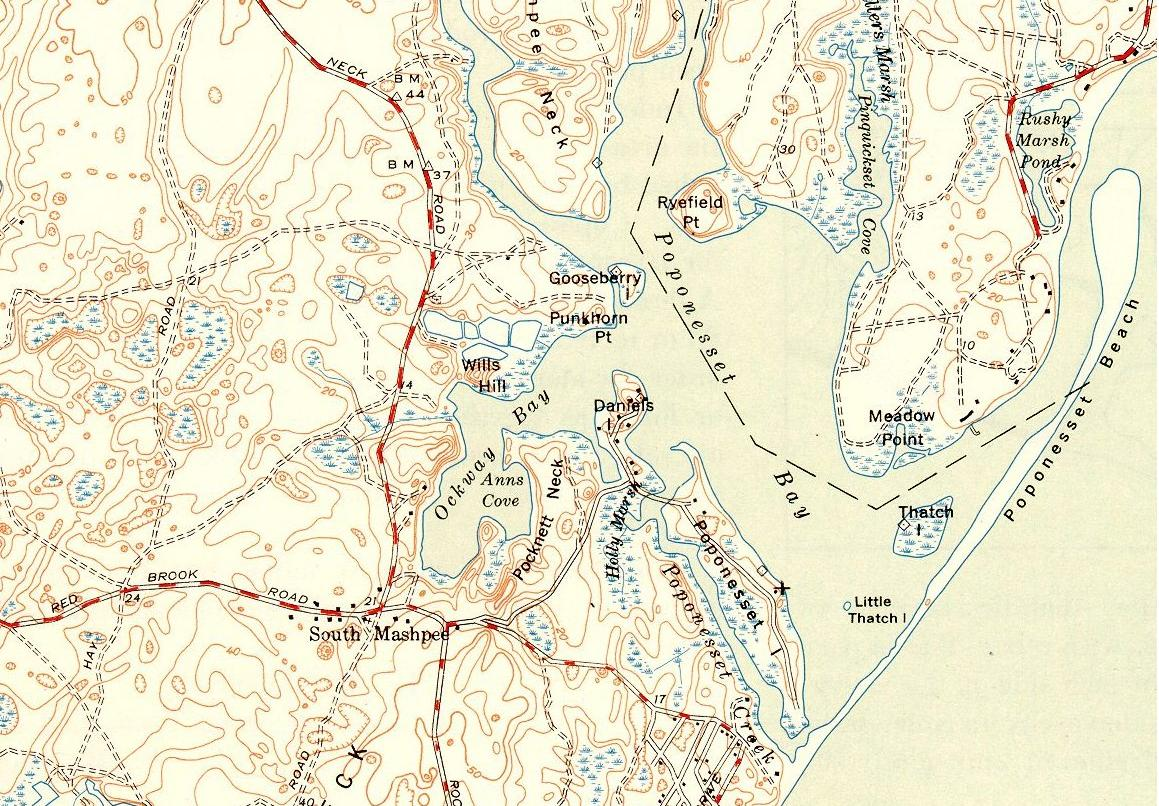
- The Popponesset Bay System
- Interactive map of Popponesset Creek
- Location: Mashpee, Massachusetts, Cape Cod
- Coordinates: 41°34′37.40″N 70°27′28.10″W
- Type: Tidal creek
- Part of: Popponesset Bay
- Primary inflows: Popponesset Bay
- Primary outflows: Popponesset Bay
- Basin countries: United States
- Surface elevation: Sea level
- Islands: Popponesset Island
- Settlements: Mashpee

Popponesset Creek is a small waterway in Mashpee, Massachusetts on Cape Cod. On both ends, it connects with Popponesset Bay.

Popponesset Creek runs from Holly Marsh down to Popponesset Peninsula and serves to separate Popponesset Island from the bay. An automobile bridge crosses Popponesset Creek from Holly Marsh to Popponesset Island.

Both sides of the creek are lined with saltwater marshland.
