= Popponesset Spit =

Beach in the U.S. state of Massachusetts

Coordinates: 41.5833°N 70.4531°W

Popponesset Spit is a spit between Popponesset Bay and Nantucket Sound. The barrier peninsula extends for about one mile (1.6 km) from the community of Popponesset in Mashpee on Cape Cod in Massachusetts and is part of the coastline known as Popponesset Beach. The tip of the peninsula is owned by the Massachusetts Audubon Society while the landward end is owned by Save Popponesset Bay.

The peninsula is now significantly shorter than seen in the Barnstable County survey of 1880. Portions of the shore have been stabilized with riprap to deter further erosion. Most of this work was done immediately after Hurricane Bob which in 1992 had opened an inlet through the beach. The peninsula is home to bird sanctuary and other conservation projects that prevent disturbance of the piping plover, an endangered species, and terns.

== See also ==
- Popponesset Island, Massachusetts
