= Robert Whitcomb =

American journalist and author

Robert Whitcomb is an American editor and writer, and chairman of Lapham's Quarterly.

== Biography ==
Robert Whitcomb grew up in Cohasset, Mass. He graduated from Dartmouth College, in 1970, with a BA in history and as a member of Phi Beta Kappa, and he received an MS in journalism from Columbia University, in 1972. He joined The Boston Herald Traveler in 1970 for a full-time job as a writer and reporter.

Whitcomb was an editor at The Wall Street Journal and at the International Herald Tribune, where he was the finance editor, and then vice president and editorial page editor of the Providence Journal. He was also the member secretary of the Aga Khan University Media Thinking Group, which helped found a media school based in Nairobi.

He has served on various nonprofit boards, including the American Library in Paris, the Providence Public Library, the Public's Radio and the local chapter of the ALS Association. He is the board chairman (as of late 2023) of the American Agora Foundation, publisher of Lapham's Quarterly.

He was a partner in the hospital consultancy Cambridge Management Group.

He is married to the painter Nancy Spears, with whom he has two adult daughters.

== Writings ==
Whitcomb co-authored Cape Wind, an environmental and social-comedy book about Cape Wind, a planned offshore wind park in Nantucket Sound, and has edited and written parts of many other books, including fiction and nonfiction, and edited scripts for several documentary films.

He has written many articles for national magazines, and twice won the Associated Press prize for best New England editorials. He is the editor of New England Diary, a weekly columnist for GoLocal24.com, and chairman of The Boston Guardian, that city's largest weekly.
