= Cape Wind =

Proposed offshore wind farm in Massachusetts, US

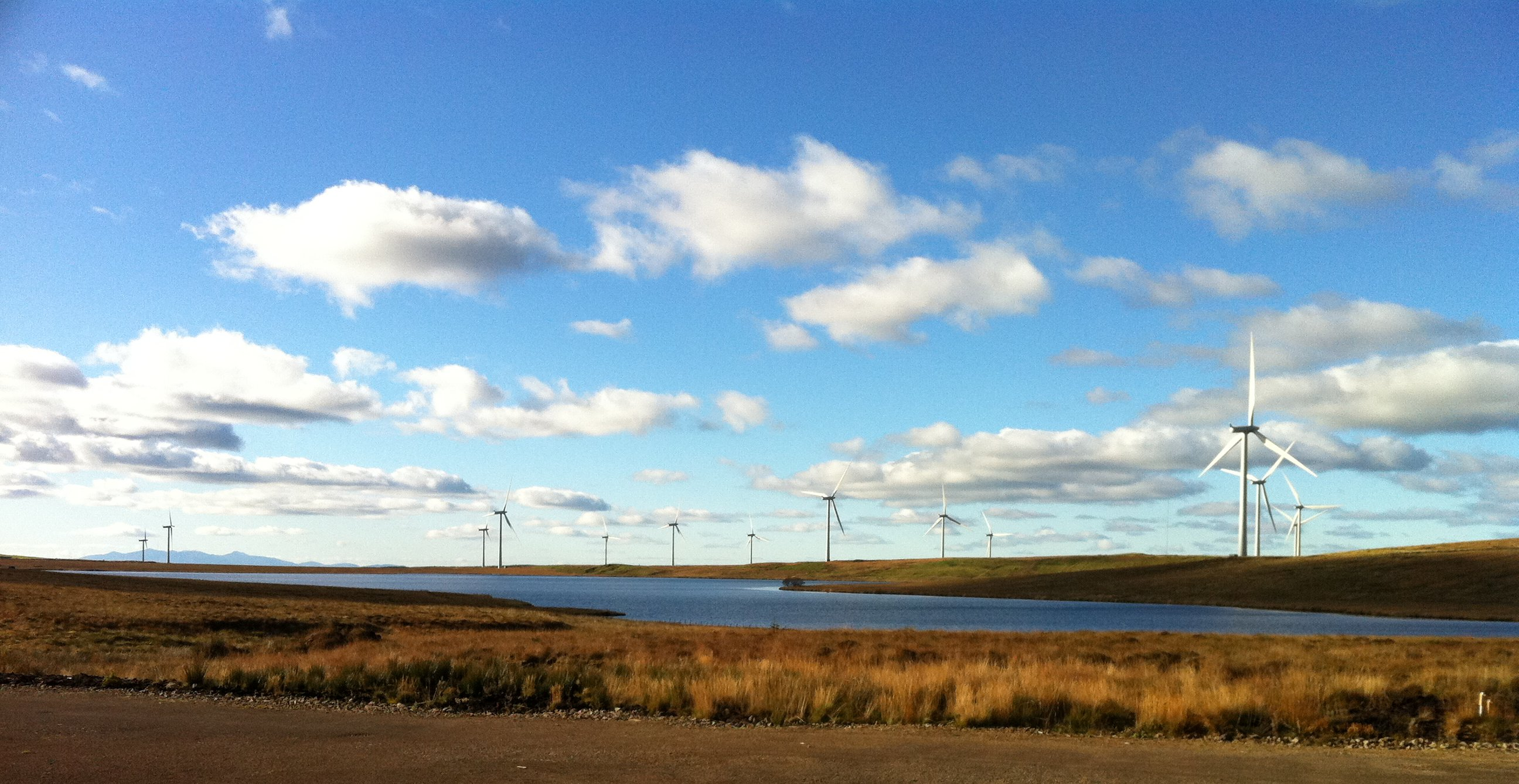
- Country: United States
- Location: Horseshoe Shoal, Nantucket Sound, Massachusetts
- Coordinates: 41.542°N 70.321°W
- Status: Defunct
- Owner: Cape Wind Associates

Wind farm
- Type: Offshore
- Hub height: 285 ft (87 m)
- Rotor diameter: 364 ft (111 m)
- Site area: 24 sq mi (62 km^{2})

Power generation
- Make and model: Siemens Wind Power
- Units planned: 130 x 3.6 MW
- Nameplate capacity: 454 MW

External links
- Website: capewind.org (archived on February 2, 2017)

The Cape Wind Project was a proposed offshore wind energy project on Horseshoe Shoal in Nantucket Sound off Cape Cod, Massachusetts, United States. It was projected to generate 1,500 gigawatt-hours of electricity a year at a first-dollar cost of $2.6 billion.

Cape Wind had arranged to borrow $2 billion from The Bank of Tokyo-Mitsubishi UFJ (BTMU), and Siemens had agreed to supply turbines for the project. Some construction began in 2013, thereby qualifying the project for the federal production tax credit, which was expiring at the end of the year.

It was approved but then lost several key contracts and suffered several licensing and legislative setbacks. National Grid and Northeast Utilities eventually terminated their power purchase agreements in January 2015, making it difficult to obtain the necessary financing for the project to progress.

The developer, Jim Gordon of Energy Management Inc., eventually terminated the lease rights for the site in late 2017.

== Plans ==
The proposed project was to cover 24 square miles (62 km^{2}) and be located 4.8 miles (7.7 km) from Mashpee, Massachusetts, on the south coast of Cape Cod, and 15.8 miles (25.4 km) from the island town of Nantucket.

Cape Wind's developer, Energy Management Inc. (EMI), was a New England–based energy company with 35 years' experience in energy conservation and development. ESS Group, Inc. of Waltham, Massachusetts, was the environmental science specialist for the project. Cape Wind was also being assisted by Woods Hole Group, K2 Management, SgurrEnergy, AWS Truepower, and PMSS. Barclays was Cape Wind's Financial Advisor. The project envisioned 130 horizontal-axis wind turbines, each with a hub height of 285 feet (87 m). The blade diameter was 364 feet (111 m), with the lowest blade tip height at 75 feet (23 m) and the top blade tip height at 440 feet (130 m). The turbines were to be sited between four and 11 miles offshore depending on the shoreline. At peak generation, the turbines were anticipated to generate 454 megawatts (MW) of electricity.

The project was expected to produce an average of 170 MW of electricity, about 75% of the average electricity demand for Cape Cod, Martha's Vineyard, and Nantucket island combined. Had it been built, it might have offset nearly a million tons of carbon dioxide a year and produced enough electricity to offset consumption of 113 million US gallons (430,000 m^{3}) of oil annually.

At the time the project was envisioned, 45% of the Cape region's electricity came from the nearby Canal Generating Plant in Sandwich, a bunker oil and natural gas run facility. The Cape Wind proposal was distinct in that it was envisioned to directly offset petroleum combustion, unlike most of the United States where electrical power generation from oil is rare and power from coal, natural gas and nuclear is more common.

Additionally, this project would have reduced the amount of oil shipped to the Canal Generating Plant; fuel for this plant had been part of two major oil spills, the first on 15 December 1976, when the tanker Argo Merchant ran aground southeast of Nantucket Island, Massachusetts spilling 7.7 million US gallons (29,000 m^{3}) of oil. The second spill occurred in April 2003, when a Bouchard Company barge carrying oil for the Mirant Canal Generating Plant ran aground, spilling 98,000 US gallons (370,000 L) of oil, which killed 450 birds and shut down 100,000 acres (400 km^{2}) of shell fishing beds.

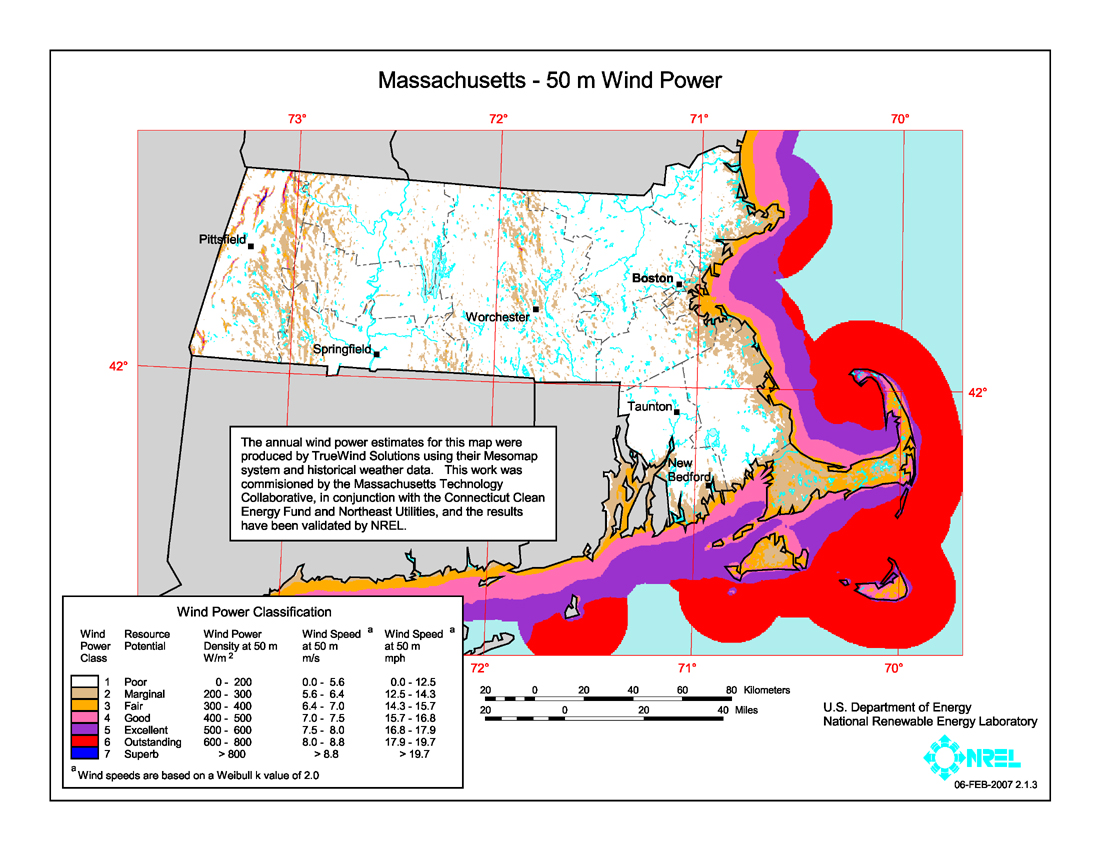
The best wind resources in Massachusetts, by far, are offshore. The Cape Wind site is between Cape Cod to the north and the islands of Nantucket, to the south, and Martha's Vineyard, to the west.

== Approval process ==
Because the proposed turbines were to be over 3 nautical miles (5.6 km; 3.5 mi) from shore, they would have been subject to federal jurisdiction. However, near-shore infrastructure including roads and power cables made the project subject to state and local jurisdiction as well. All necessary state and local pre-construction approvals were obtained by 2009. Major federal approvals were obtained 17 May 2010, with lease details and construction and operation permits to be granted as the project proceeded.

=== State and local approvals ===
At the state and local level, according to the Boston Globe, Cape Wind needed approval from the Cape Cod Commission; "a Chapter 91 license from the Department of Environmental Protection; a water quality certification from the state DEP; access permits from the Massachusetts Highway Department for work along state highways; a license from the Executive Office of Transportation for a railway crossing; orders of conditions from the Yarmouth and Barnstable Conservation Commissions; and road opening permits from Yarmouth and Barnstable."

On 11 May 2005, the Massachusetts Energy Facilities Siting Board (MEFSB) approved the application to build the wind farm. Opponents appealed the decision and on 18 December 2006 the Massachusetts Supreme Judicial Court upheld the decision.

In March 2007, the project received approval from Ian Bowles, the Massachusetts Secretary of Energy and Environmental Affairs, as required by the Massachusetts Environmental Policy Act (MEPA). In October 2007, the Cape Cod Commission declined to approve Cape Wind without further study of the impact by the developers.

On 20 June 2008, the Barnstable Superior Court dismissed four of five counts against the MEPA certificate that had been filed by opposition groups and the Town of Barnstable. The fifth count was not considered ripe for a ruling since the matter was still pending before a state agency.

On 22 May 2009, the Massachusetts Energy Facilities Siting Board issued a "Super Permit" to Cape Wind, overriding the Cape Cod Commission and obviating the need for further state and local approvals.

On 31 August 2010, the Massachusetts Supreme Judicial Court ruled 4–2 that the state had the power to overrule community opposition and granted the Cape Wind project a suite of local permits it needed to start construction.

On 28 December 2011, a ruling by "the Massachusetts Supreme Judicial Court gave its blessing to a novel power purchase agreement between Cape Wind and National Grid," as reported by the Boston Globe, and in so doing "the high court unanimously rejected criticisms by wind farm opponents of the state reviews of the agreement, under which National Grid would buy 50% of the wind farm's power."

=== Federal approvals ===
At the federal level, Cape Wind originally applied for a permit in 2001 under Section 10 of the Rivers and Harbors Act of 1899 with the US Army Corps of Engineers. The Army Corps eventually presented a draft Environmental Impact Statement (EIS). In a public comment period, many federal agencies, local governments, and community groups found that the draft EIS had deficiencies. Due to passage of the 2005 Energy Bill, the regulatory authority for off-shore energy projects had been transferred from the Army Corps to the Minerals Management Service (MMS) within the Department of the Interior. Whereas Cape Wind had expected to obtain approval quickly from the Army Corps, this transfer of authority to the MMS delayed the project.

The MMS issued a Draft Environmental Impact Statement (DEIS) in January 2008, and a Final Environmental Impact Report (FEIR) in January 2009.

On 4 January 2010, US Interior Secretary Ken Salazar called a meeting of principal parties to resolve remaining issues after the National Park Service ruled that Nantucket Sound was eligible to be listed on the National Register of Historic Places because of its cultural and spiritual significance to two Native American tribes. "After several years of review, it is now time to move the Cape Wind proposal to a final decision point. That is why I am gathering the principal parties together next week to consider the findings of the Keeper and to discuss how we might find a common-sense agreement on actions that could be taken to minimize and mitigate Cape Wind's potential impacts on historic and cultural resources. I am hopeful that an agreement among the parties can be reached by March 1. If an agreement among the parties can't be reached, I will be prepared to take the steps necessary to bring the permit process to conclusion. The public, the parties, and the permit applicants deserve certainty and resolution."

On 22 March 2010, a hearing was held before the Advisory Council on Historic Preservation. Proponents and opponents of the plan delivered testimony during the hearing. The council was to deliver their recommendations to Interior Secretary Salazar no later than 14 April 2010.

On 28 April 2010, at a news conference in the Massachusetts Statehouse alongside governor Deval Patrick, a supporter of the project, Secretary Salazar announced "I am approving the Cape Wind project." The Preferred Alternative of Horseshoe Shoal was selected by the Record of Decision.

The Federal Aviation Administration cleared the construction of the wind farm on 17 May 2010 after raising concerns that the wind turbine structures could interfere with radar system at nearby Otis Air Force Base. Cape Wind agreed to fix the base's system to ensure that it would not be affected by the wind farm. On 28 October 2011, the US Court of Appeals for the District of Columbia rejected the FAA's ruling. The court ordered the 'no hazard' determinations vacated and remanded back to the FAA. On 15 August 2012 Cape Wind again received full approval from the FAA, which determined that the wind farm would cause no danger to aircraft operations. However, Cape Wind had begun its planning, even without full federal approval.

The Alliance to Protect Nantucket Sound filed a lawsuit in June 2010, claiming that federal approvals violated the Endangered Species Act, Migratory Bird Treaty Act, and National Environmental Policy Act.

On 6 October 2010, Interior Secretary Salazar announced that a 28-year lease had been signed, which would have cost Cape Wind an annual fee of $88,278 before construction, and a two to seven percent variable operating fee during production, based on revenue from selling the energy.

On 22 November 2010, a 15-year power purchase agreement between Cape Wind and National Grid was signed for 50% of the electricity, at a price of 18.7¢/kWh, which would have added $1.50 a month to the electricity bill of an average home.

On 7 January 2011, Cape Wind announced it had received permits from the US Army Corps of Engineers and the US Environmental Protection Agency.

On 18 April 2011, the Bureau of Ocean Energy Management, Regulation and Enforcement granted its necessary approval for the project.

In Summer 2011, the Wampanoag Tribe of Gay Head (Aquinnah) filed a lawsuit against the federal government for allowing Cape Wind to move forward. Contradicting the Aquinnahs, the Pocasset Wampanoag Tribe previously had expressed support for the project.

In July 2016, an appeals court ruled that the Bureau of Ocean Energy Management had not obtained "sufficient site-specific data on seafloor" as obligated by the National Environmental Policy Act.

== Power purchase agreements ==
Cape Wind had signed a power purchase agreement with National Grid to sell half the project's output (i.e., about 750GW·h per year) for an initial price of 20.7¢/kW·h (later reduced to 18.7¢)—a price more than twice then-current retail rates (though increases in electrical prices in the winter of 2014 narrowed the difference significantly). The deal was subject to approval by the Massachusetts Department of Public Utilities (PUC). In February 2012, NSTAR Utility agreed to a PPA equivalent of 129 MW capacity, a demand from PUC for allowing NSTAR and Northeast Utilities to complete a $4.8 billion merger. The second power purchase agreement with state utility NSTAR for 27.5% of the output had also been approved by Massachusetts regulators.

In January 2015, National Grid and Northeast Utilities cited Cape Wind's failure to obtain financing by 31 December 31, 2014 as grounds for terminating their contract. National Grid spokesman Jake Navarro said the company was "disappointed that Cape Wind has been unable to meet its commitments under the contract, resulting in today's termination of the power purchase agreement". According to Cape Wind, the terminations were invalid because of contract provisions that would extend the deadlines. After NStar and National Grid cancelled their contracts with Cape Wind, Cape Wind's leases with Quonset Development Corporation (for a port facility), Falmouth Harbor Marina (for headquarters), and New Bedford Marine Commerce (for staging and construction) were terminated. Additionally, Cape Wind was suspended by Independent System Operator/New England from participating in New England's wholesale electricity markets.

== Controversy ==
Controversy surrounding Cape Wind had been focused on its proposed location in Nantucket Sound. Because Cape Wind was positioning its project as a potential ecotourism destination, it was criticized for disguising (or greenwashing) its industrial aspects.

Supporters of the project, led by the non-profit grassroots organization Clean Power Now, cited wind's ability to displace oil and gas consumption with clean, locally produced energy and claimed that the project was the best option for much-needed new generating capacity in the region. It would have supplied 75% of the average electrical needs of Cape Cod and the Islands. The Massachusetts Audubon Society conditionally endorsed the project in March 2006 as safe for birds, but asked for further studies.

Year round and summer residents expressed concerns over the location of the project: some claiming that the project would ruin scenic views from private properties as well as views from public properties like beaches, as the turbines would be only 4.8 miles from shore and therefore would decrease property values, ruin popular areas for yachting, and cause other environmental problems. The Alliance to Protect Nantucket Sound argued that Nantucket Sound was known worldwide for its wildlife and natural beauty.

Phillip Scudder, owner of the Hy-Line ferry service on Cape Cod, originally opposed the project because he wondered how to navigate around the turbines when going to Martha's Vineyard, but changed his opposition to support in light of the economic opportunity to provide "eco-tours."

Walter Cronkite drew attention by coming out against the wind farm; he later changed his opinion. Other opponents included the late Senator Ted Kennedy, former Governor Mitt Romney, and businessman Bill Koch, who has donated $1.5 million to the Alliance to Protect Nantucket Sound. Massachusetts Governor Deval Patrick and the state's junior senator John Kerry supported Cape Wind after it had passed key federal review thresholds.

Proponents suggested that some opposition was motivated in part by ownership of real-estate on Nantucket, Martha's Vineyard or the mainland and that it raised issues of environmental justice. Robert F. Kennedy Jr., whose family's Kennedy Compound is within sight of the proposed wind farm, wrote an essay for the New York Times stating his support for wind power in general, but opposing the project. However, this did not represent the view of most Massachusetts citizens: in a 2005 survey, 81% of adults supported the project, 61% of Cape Cod residents supported it, and 14% of adults opposed it.

In 2012, then-candidate for Congress Joseph Kennedy III, in a break from other Kennedy family members, announced his support for the Cape Wind project.

A 2007 book by Robert Whitcomb, Vice President and Editorial Page Editor of the Providence Journal, and Wendy Williams argued that the fight over Cape Wind involved a powerful, privileged minority imposing its will on the majority.

In 2014, a judge dismissed the 26th lawsuit against Cape Wind and commented "There comes a point at which the right to litigate can become a vexatious abuse of the democratic process."

In January 2015, Ian Bowles, the Massachusetts Energy and Environment head, cited the recent breach of contract from Cape Wind as indicating that the development most likely had been abandoned, "Presumably, this means the project will not move forward."

=== 2006 election ===
Cape Wind was an issue in the 2006 election for Governor of Massachusetts. The winner, Democrat Deval Patrick, supported the project; his Republican opponent, former Lieutenant Governor Kerry Healey, opposed it.

=== 2012 election ===
An article by Grist.org on 17 July 2012 explained that Mitt Romney strongly opposed the Cape Wind project beginning in 2006. If elected Romney could have severely affected the project's continuation, which was set to begin building in 2013. William Koch, who opposed the Cape Wind project, was also a major contributor to Romney's presidential election, donating a record two million dollars.

In the 2012 Massachusetts Senate race, Scott Brown, the Republican incumbent, opposed Cape Wind while his Democratic challenger and the election winner, Elizabeth Warren supported the project.

=== Movies and TV ===
In 2003 a documentary film entitled Wind Over Water was released about the controversy over the Cape Wind Project. The film by journalist Ole Tangen Jr. chronicled the debate as it unfolded on the Cape. An independent production, the filmmaker interviewed subjects from both sides of the debate including Jim Gordon, the driving force behind Cape Wind and Isaac Rosen, then director of the Alliance to Protect Nantucket Sound. Focusing also on wind power in general, Wind Over Water featured aerial footage of the offshore wind farm at Horns Rev in Denmark and footage of various wind farms in the U. On 6 December 2003, the film made its world and Cape Cod premiere at the Lillie Auditorium in Woods Hole.

Satirical news correspondent Jason Jones of The Daily Show also covered the Cape Wind project.

A feature-length documentary about the Cape Wind project, entitled Cape Spin: An American Power Struggle, had pre-release screenings in the summer of 2011.

=== Books ===
Wendy Williams and Robert Whitcomb wrote a book about the project's history called Cape Wind: Money, Celebrity, Class, Politics and the Battle for Our Energy Future on Nantucket Sound. In an interview, one of the authors stated that the fight over Cape Wind was a case of "a very small group of people, with more money than most of us can possibly imagine, who decided from the very beginning [...] that they didn't want it there, it would upset their martini time."

=== Public opinion survey results ===
A 2007 Opinion Research Corporation (ORC) survey of 600 state residents found that 93% of Massachusetts residents agreed that the state should be "a national leader in using cleaner and renewable energy on a large scale by moving ahead with offshore wind power" and other clean energy initiatives. The statement was supported by 78% of those living on the Cape and on the Islands.

The 2007 ORC survey also found that 84% of Massachusetts residents – including 58% of those living on the Cape and on the Islands – explicitly supported "the proposed Cape Wind offshore wind farm that would involve wind turbines being placed in Nantucket Sound about five and a half miles from the Town of Hyannis." (A June 2006 survey posed the same question and found 81% support statewide and 61% in Cape Cod/the Islands.)

In 2007, 78% of Massachusetts residents surveyed, including 61% of those living on the Cape and on the Islands, supported wind as the best energy resource to provide electricity to Cape Cod and the Islands. Statewide, the support for other alternatives was as follows: nuclear (10%); coal (4%); and other (5%).

Clean renewable energy was widely supported over nuclear power in Massachusetts, including on the Cape and on the Islands. Massachusetts residents expressed preference for solar power (91%), more energy conservation (90%), and wind power (89%) used first before resorting to more nuclear power. On the Cape and on the Islands, the views were similar, with strong support for wind power (75%); conservation (81%); and solar (84%).

2007 survey results were based on telephone interviews conducted among a sample of 600 householders aged18 and over. Interviewing was completed by Opinion Research Corporation for the Newton-based Civil Society Institute, during July and August 2007.

During the 4 November 2008 election, 87% of voters in eleven Massachusetts towns on the south shore, near but not on the Cape, voted yes on Question 4, a non-binding question that read, "Should the state representative from this district be instructed to vote in favor of legislation that would support the development of Cape Wind in Nantucket Sound and other possible future onshore and offshore wind power developments in Massachusetts?" The measure was voted on by the towns of Braintree, Holbrook, Randolph, Cohasset, Hingham, Hull, Marshfield, Scituate, Hanover, Norwell, and Rockland. A 2009 poll by the Cape Cod Chamber of Commerce showed that 55% of its members opposed the project and 41% supported it.

A 2010 poll by the Boston Globe found that 69% of respondents supported Cape Wind, and 20% opposed it. Questions about cost found that half of respondents said they would not support paying higher prices for the project's electricity. In general, however, many respondents said they would be in favor of paying higher rates if it meant getting electricity from cleaner sources. Forty-two percent said they would be willing to pay more, while seven percent were unsure.

In 2011, "Earlier that year, the Civil Society Institute commissioned an independent scientific survey of public opinion on Cape Wind that found 81% support in the State of Massachusetts, and their sub-sample of Cape and Islands residents also found more support than opposition."

In 2011, Mass Inc. polling group hosted a poll, "The 80% Challenge: A Survey of Climate Change Opinion and Action in Massachusetts". Its findings showed "when asked about future energy needs, large majorities said they would like to see more reliance on solar power (87%), wind power (86%), and natural gas (64%), far higher than levels who want to see more coal (21%), oil (14%) or nuclear power (31%)." Furthermore, "The survey showed, among many factors, strong support for renewable energy, with eight in ten residents willing to pay an extra one dollar, and 60% saying they would pay up to five dollars more for renewable energy over traditional sources like oil or coal."

A 2013 survey conducted by the University of New Hampshire Survey Center polled 503 Massachusetts residents about the Cape Wind project. More respondents opposed the project than supported it and 50% thought it should be halted. Nearly two-thirds wanted utilities to buy less expensive power instead of more expensive renewable sources.

=== Cost ===
In 2010, the Massachusetts Attorney General's office estimated that Cape Wind would ultimately cost $2.5 billion. Monetary costs of the electricity generated by the project were estimated to be double the 2010 price of traditional fossil fuels.

In 2014, the Republican side of the House voted to block a $150 million loan guarantee for Cape Wind, acknowledging that the block was narrowly targeted. The project had a $600 million loan guarantee from the Danish export credit agency, their biggest ever, and another $200 million from PensionDanmark; combined funding amounted to $1.45 billion.

== Other Cape Cod wind projects ==
According to a report in the Boston Globe 24 May 2006, Jay M. Cashman, owner of a large construction company that built part of the Big Dig, proposed to build a $750 million wind farm in Buzzards Bay, about 20 miles (32 km) west of the proposed Cape Wind site. The Cashman farm would have been closer (two miles) to shore and would have consisted of 120 turbines, each 450 feet (140 m) tall. The projected generation capacity was 300 MW. According to the Globe, some opponents of the Cape Wind project expressed interest in the Cashman plan.

In February, 2008, state law was amended removing a prohibition on the construction of electrical generating facilities within ocean sanctuaries.

Vineyard Wind began construction in 2021.

== See also ==
- Energy Policy Act of 2005
- Block Island Wind Farm
- List of offshore wind farms in the United States
- Vineyard Wind
- Mayflower Wind
- Wind power in Massachusetts
