= New Seabury, Massachusetts =

- Census-designated place
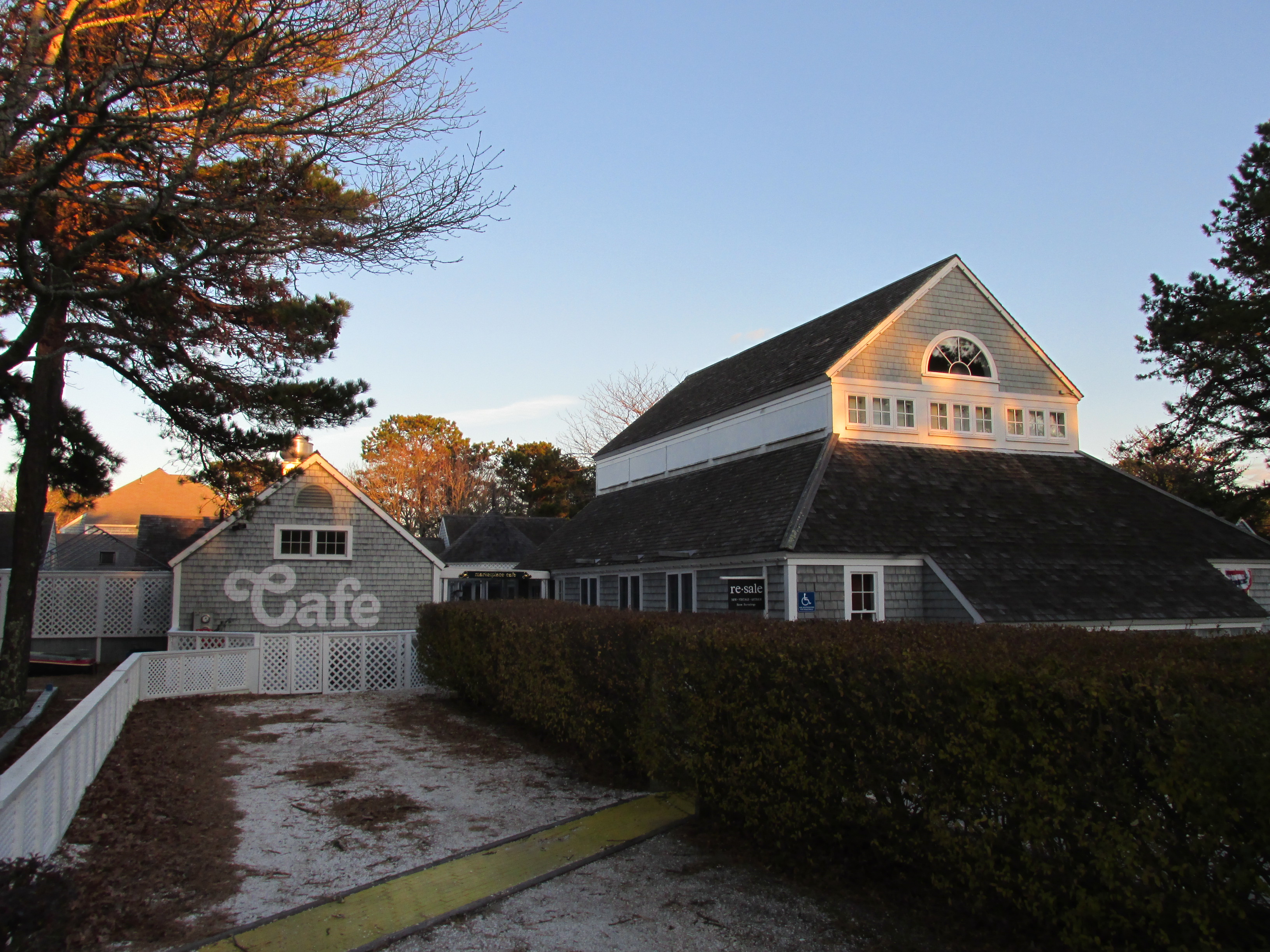
- Popponesset Marketplace

- Location in Barnstable County and the state of Massachusetts.
- Coordinates: 41°34′23″N 70°28′27″W
- Country: United States
- State: Massachusetts
- County: Barnstable
- Town: Mashpee

Area
  - Total: 2.58 sq mi (6.67 km^{2})
  - Land: 2.41 sq mi (6.24 km^{2})
  - Water: 0.17 sq mi (0.43 km^{2})
- Elevation: 26 ft (8 m)

Population (2020)
  - Total: 852
  - Density: 353.6/sq mi (136.53/km^{2})
- Time zone: UTC-5 (Eastern (EST))
  - Summer (DST): UTC-4 (EDT)
- ZIP Code: 02649 (Mashpee)
- Area code: 508
- FIPS code: 25-45500
- GNIS feature ID: 1877297

New Seabury is a census-designated place (CDP) in the town of Mashpee in Barnstable County, Massachusetts, United States, on Cape Cod. The area consists primarily of summer homes for wealthy families. Attractions include a county club and the Fells Pond, Daniels Island, and Littleneck Bay neighborhoods. As of the 2020 census, New Seabury had a population of 852. The community is located on the historic home of the Wampanoag Nation. The New Seabury area is often extended to include Popponesset and Popponesset Island, which are only accessible by road through New Seabury and are part of the New Seabury development, but are grouped separately for Census purposes.

== Native American Site ==
New Seabury came into being during the vacation-home boom for upper-income retirees, self-employed, and long-distance commuters, who fled to coastal areas of New England during the 1960s and 1970s. What was once an almost exclusively Native American populated area, became predominantly white inhabitants. Before the construction of the New Seabury Condominiums, the Wampanoag population of the area regarded land as they always had: communal. With the vacation-home boom, "the newcomers (seized) control of town government and began erecting physical and legal barriers to the lands the Wampanoags had enjoyed for countless generations, most glaringly in the form of the New Seabury condominium complex on the coast of Mashpee."

== Geography ==
New Seabury is located in the southern part of the town of Mashpee at 41°34′23″N 70°28′27″W. It is bordered to the south by Vineyard Sound and Nantucket Sound, to the east by the Popponesset and Popponesset Island CDPs, to the north by Ockway Bay, and to the west by Great Oak Road. A small portion of the CDP crosses Great Oak Road and extends west to the Great River, opposite Monomoscoy Island.

According to the United States Census Bureau, the New Seabury CDP has a total area of 2.5 square miles (6.6 km^{2}), of which 2.4 square miles (6.2 km^{2}) is land, and 0.15 square miles (0.4 km^{2}) (6.56%) is water.

== Climate ==
In a typical year, New Seabury, Massachusetts temperatures fall below 50 °F (10 °C) for 167 days per year. Annual precipitation is typically 45.4 inches per year (high for the US) and snow covers the ground 0 days per year, or 0% of the year (the lowest in the US). It may be helpful to understand the yearly precipitation by imagining nine straight days of moderate rain per year. The humidity is below 60% for approximately 27.6 days, or 7.6% of the year.

== Demographics ==
Historical population
Census	Pop.	Note	%±
2020	852		—
U.S. Decennial Census

At the 2000 census there were 815 people, 411 households, and 279 families in the CDP. The population density was 132.8/km^{2} (343.9/mi^{2}). There were 1,493 housing units at an average density of 243.2/km^{2} (630.0/mi^{2}). The racial makeup of the CDP was 95.83% White, 0.37% African American, 0.12% Native American, 0.61% Asian, 0.86% from other races, and 2.21% from two or more races. Hispanic or Latino of any race were 1.10%.

Of the 411 households 10.0% had children under the age of 18 living with them, 64.0% were married couples living together, 3.2% had a female householder with no husband present, and 32.1% were non-families. 28.7% of households were one person and 13.9% were one person aged 65 or older. The average household size was 1.98 and the average family size was 2.37.

The age distribution was 9.1% under the age of 18, 2.2% from 18 to 24, 13.9% from 25 to 44, 37.4% from 45 to 64, and 37.4% 65 or older. The median age was 59 years. For every 100 females, there were 95.4 males. For every 100 females age 18 and over, there were 93.0 males.

The median household income was $85,594 and the median family income was $94,028. Males had a median income of $60,441 versus $29,333 for females. The per capita income for the CDP was $59,130. About 1.8% of families and 1.5% of the population were below the poverty line, including none of those under age 18 and 3.8% of those age 65 or over.

== Flood and Erosion Control ==
In 2011, the Mashpee Conservation Commission permitted the construction of an alternative coastal erosion control sea wall along Shore Drive West in New Seabury which consists of wooden pilings with one-inch gaps in between that allow waves to break through the wall and for sand replenishment along the beach. This is a resilience method that lies between gray infrastructure and green infrastructure and allows for the building of banks that protect homes from coastal flooding and sea level rise while simultaneously allowing for natural sedimentation processes to occur. Through this, the system can absorb wave energy and control flooding while also facilitating erosion from the banks onto the beach; this system requires the manual placement of sand behind the pilings. Because of its permeability, this alternative sea wall is permitted under the Massachusetts Wetlands Protection Act.

Although the system has been noted to function, there has been scrutiny from the Mashpee Conservation Commission toward New Seabury's maintenance of the system. The inch-wide gaps between pilings has been noted to be blocked as a result of debris and lack of maintenance, leading to the permeable system to function as an impermeable wall. Because of this, the Mashpee Conservation Commission would like the New Seabury Properties to submit quarterly reports about the condition and upkeep of the sea wall because debris behind the wall can stop sand on the bank from replenishing the beach (1).

In 2014, homeowners on Shore Drive West applied to the Mashpee Conservation Commission to construct a very similar system along their properties that consisted of similar pilings alongside coir envelopes and fiber rolls embedded in the dunes that would facilitate bank growth and erosion control. These homeowners would be required to vegetate these dunes. While it was initially approved, neighbors appealed the decision to the MassDEP who ultimately suggested that the proposal be rejected. In spite of this, thirty-six Massachusetts state legislators joined to demand the project be allowed to continue, especially considering the precedent that the decision would set for other coastal areas. The reason for rejection was that the wooden pilings could alter sediment transport and tidal patterns which violates the Wetlands Protection Act of 1978, though the coir and fiber were permissible “soft” solutions. The ultimate suggestion was to use smaller wooden poles spaced further out than the timber pilings.
