= Clean Power Now =

Renewable energy activism organisation

Clean Power Now is based out of Hyannis, Massachusetts and has a member base of over 12,000 members in 49 states. It is a 501(c)(3) nonprofit grassroots organization working to inform citizens and empower them to support viable renewable energy projects and policies. Their belief is that new energy projects, combined with efficiency and conservation efforts will bring about a clean, healthy environment, an improved economy, and a more secure, sustainable world.

The organization's immediate focus is to increase citizen support of offshore wind power in Nantucket Sound, namely the Cape Wind Project. Cape Wind is proposing America's first offshore wind farm on Horseshoe Shoal in Nantucket Sound. Over 5 miles (8.0 km) from the nearest shore, 130 wind turbines will use the wind to produce a peak 420 megawatts of power. In average winds, Cape Wind will provide three quarters of the energy required for the Cape and Islands.

== History ==
Clean Power Now was formed in 2003 after an opposition group, The Alliance to Protect Nantucket Sound was formed against the Cape Wind project proposed in 2001. The first executive director, Matt Palmer, served for two years until in 2006 Barbara Hill, who served as project coordinator for Offshore Wind with the Massachusetts Technology Collaborative for three and a half years, assumed the role as executive director from Matt Palmer and remains there today.

== Media ==
Clean Power Now is the primary advocate for the construction of the Cape Wind Project and is an active participant in public hearings, media coverage of the project, and in documentaries.

In 2007, The Daily Show reporter Jason Jones featured Clean Power Now and Executive Director Barbara Hill as a part of his special on the Cape Wind Issue.

Cape Spin: An American Power Struggle is a feature-length documentary written, produced, and directed by Robbie Gemmel and Daniel Coffin of Rebirth Productions in association with Sundance Channel. Using the events of the Cape Wind project as a microcosm of America's struggle toward sustainability and energy independence, it is a detailed exploration of the trials and tribulations of implementing utility-scale renewable energy projects.

Clean Power Now has also produced a series of videos called The Vision series. These videos provide information about wind power and other renewable energy sources on Cape Cod and in Europe.

On the Clean Power Now website, videos from Public Hearings are available.

In 2009, RenewableEnergyWorld.com posted Clean Power Now's "The View and The Vision" video on its website. This video features the group's tour of the Nysted wind farm in Denmark. The trip was organized and led by Bill and Dorte Griswald.
