= Bliss Wind Farm =

Wind farm in Eagle, New York, U.S.

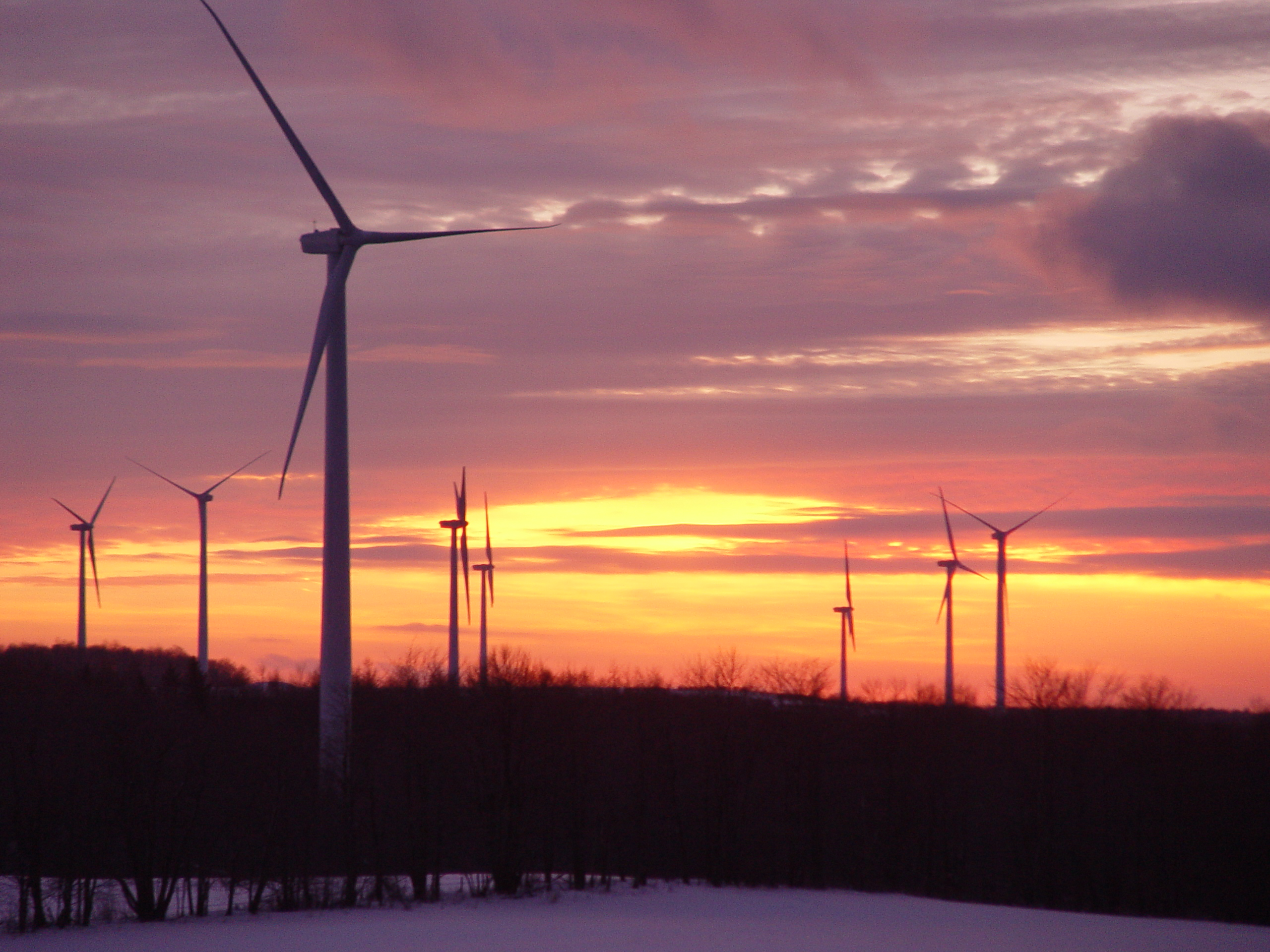
- Bliss wind farm at sunset
- Official name: Noble Bliss Windpark
- Country: USA
- Location: Wyoming County, New York
- Coordinates: 42°33′N 78°15′W
- Status: Operational
- Construction began: 2007
- Commission date: May 18, 2008
- Construction cost: $200 Million
- Owner: Noble Environmental Power

Wind farm
- Type: Onshore
- Site usage: Farm land

Power generation
- Units operational: 67
- Make and model: GE Wind Energy: 1.5MW SLE
- Nameplate capacity: 100.5 MW

External links
- Website: www.noblepower.com/our-windparks/bliss/index.html
- Commons: Related media on Commons

The Bliss Wind Farm is a 100.5 megawatt wind energy project built by Noble Environmental Power, that opened May 18, 2008. The $210-million project is in Eagle, New York in Wyoming County, and consists of 67 General Electric 1.5 megawatt turbines.

== Project history ==
- June 2007 - New York State Energy Research and Development Authority awards contract to provide renewable energy
- June 2007 - Construction begins
- June 2007 - Financing of project secured
- May 2008 - Operational

== See also ==
- Wind power in New York
