= Wind power in New York =

Electricity from wind in one U.S. state

Wind power projects in New York
Operating
Under construction
Proposed
Canceled or decommissioned

New York has 2,192 MW of installed wind power capacity as of 2022. Most of New York's wind power is located upstate, as onshore wind farms. New York has set a goal of developing 9,000 MW of offshore installed wind power capacity by 2035 that will power an estimated 6 million homes. As of October 2022, the state has five offshore wind farms in development with approximately 4,300 MW installed capacity.

== Wind farms ==
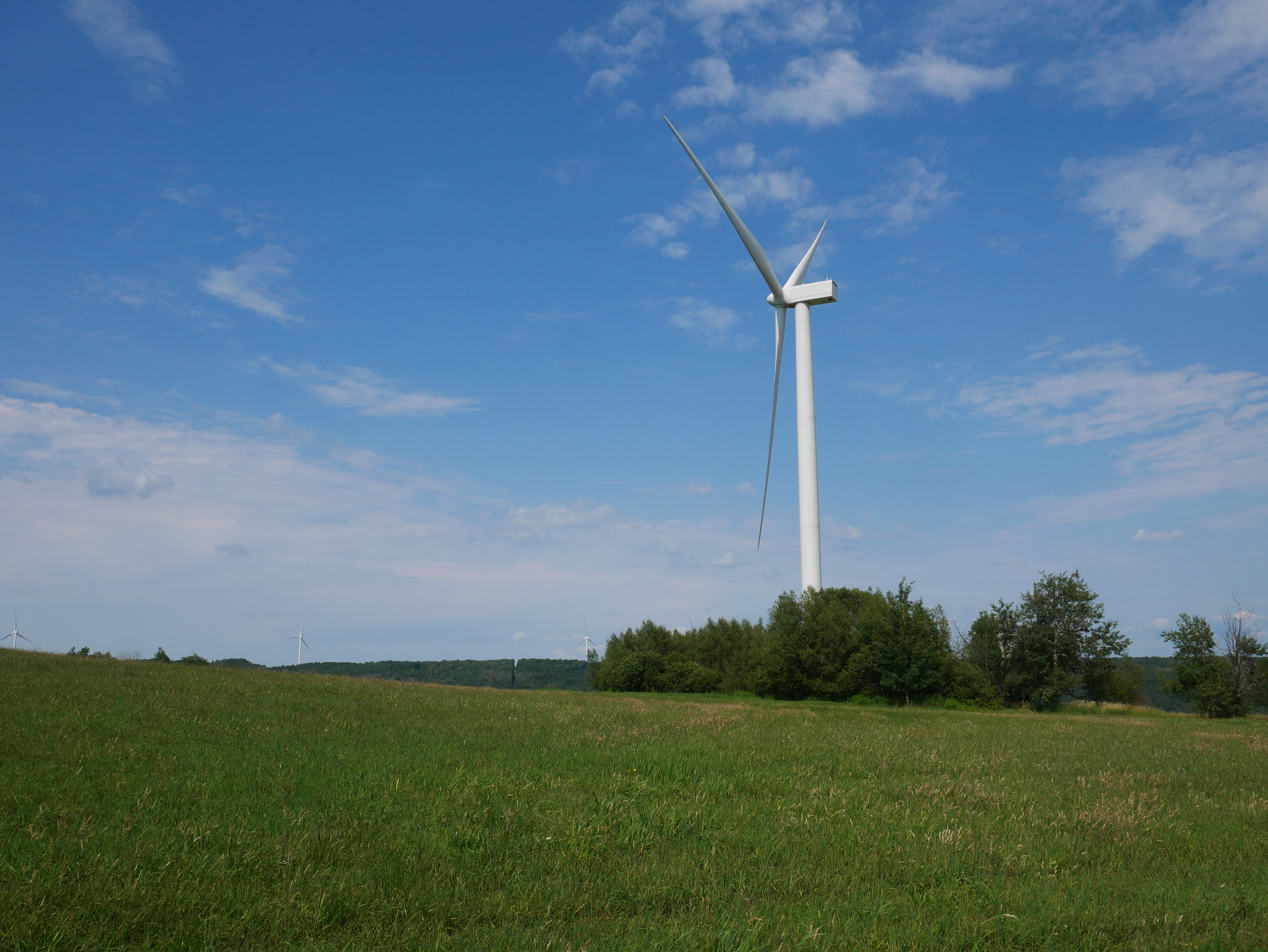
Cassadaga Wind Farm

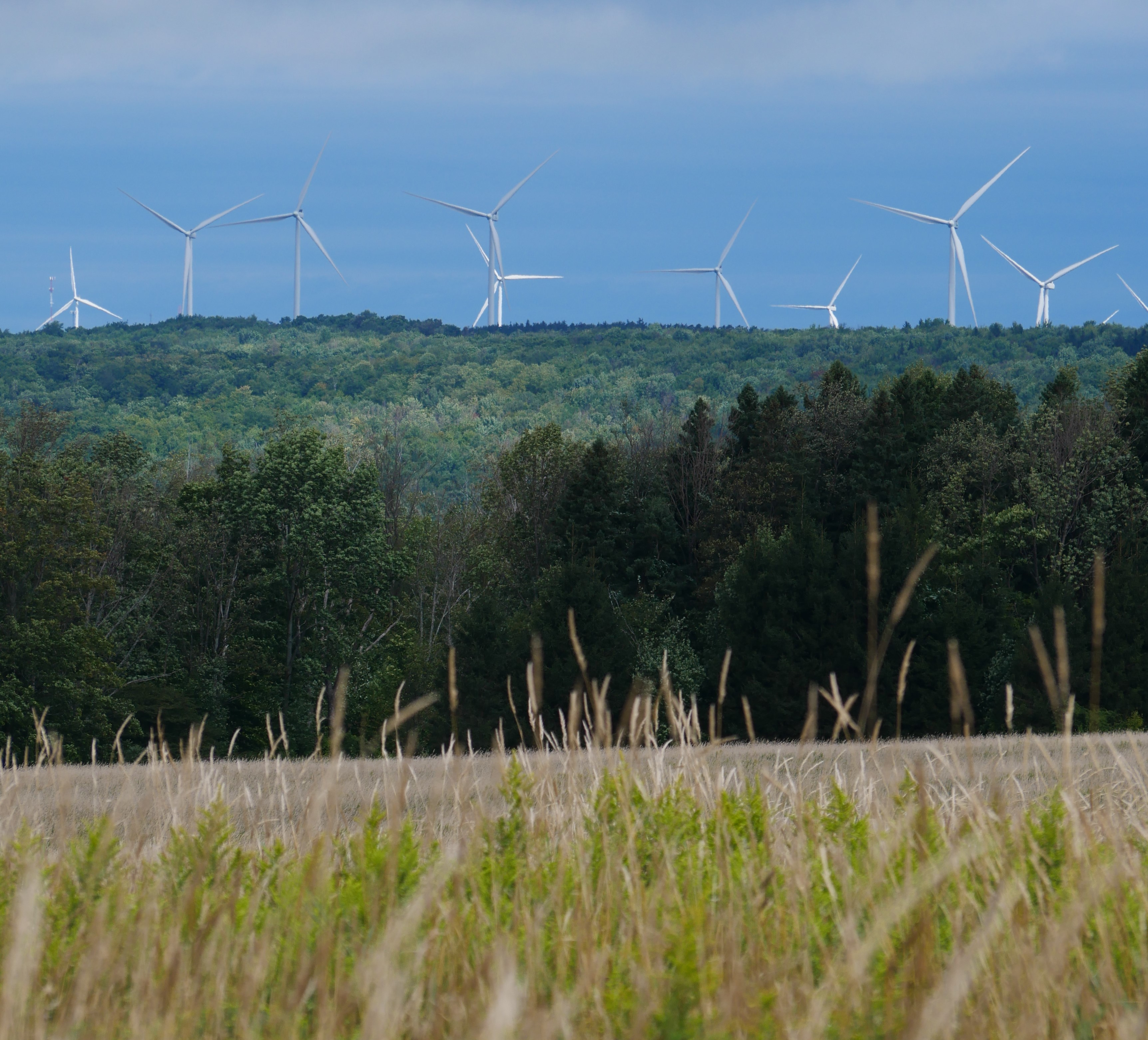
Arkwright Summit Wind Farm

The first wind farms in New York came online in 2000. They were relatively small projects. Madison Wind Farm, with a nameplate generating capacity of 11.55 MW, located in Madison County, was the first to commence operations. Also that year, the 6.6 MW Wethersfield Wind Farm in Wyoming County came on line. The following year, the 30 MW Fenner Wind Farm, also in Madison County, commenced operations.

Five years passed before Maple Ridge Wind Farm, the largest wind farm in the state of New York, located in Lewis County, with 195 Vestas model V82 1.65 megawatt (MW) wind turbines, commenced operations. Collectively, the turbines have a rated or nameplate capacity of 320 MW. Maple Ridge Wind Farm became fully operational in January 2006.

The Bliss Windpark in Wyoming County opened in May 2008 with a capacity of 100.5 megawatts. Also in 2008, the 100.5 MW Clinton Windpark, located in Clinton County, commenced operations. In February 2009, three other large wind farms — the Altona, Chateaugay, and Wethersfield Windparks — were completed in Upstate New York in Clinton, Franklin, and Wyoming counties, respectively. The projects have an installed capacity of 97.5, 106.5, and 124 MW respectively. All four use General Electric 1.5SLE wind turbines. The 112.5 MW Sheldon Wind Project in Wyoming County also came on line in 2009. In 2010, the Hardscrabble Wind Farm located in Herkimer County was constructed in the towns of Fairfield, and Norway, New York. The wind farm has 37 Gamesa G90 2.0 MW wind turbines and came online in 2011. The project generates 74 megawatts of power and is owned by Avangrid Renewables. In 2012, the 215 MW Marble River Wind Farm, in Clinton County, commenced operations. Wind farms completed in 2018 include Arkwright Summit Wind Farm and Copenhagen Wind Farm.

In September 2025, the seven turbines at Madison Wind Farm were demolished by operator EDP renewables, citing the end of their useful life (25 years), lack of replacement parts, and diminished capacity factor (14% vs planned 22%).

The capacity factor of wind farms in New York is about 30 percent. However, the effective capacity — the fraction of rated power generated during summer afternoons, the period of peak demand — is estimated to be 10% for the whole state, except for Long Island, where about 40% is forecast.

== Wind power development ==
Wind is able to provide energy without emitting greenhouse gases. More than a quarter of power of the athletic complex at Union College of Schenectady County is supported by the endorsement of tall wind turbines. In 2014, energy projects accounted for more than 1,800 MW. This is estimated to be around 2.6 of the electric power available from generation facilities in New York. While two power projects are being constructed in the state of New York, there is also a project under active review.

This series of projects is just a start for New York, the 15th windiest state in the nation. The National Renewable Energy Laboratory has confirmed that the wind resource is able to provide at least half of the needs of the state's electricity.

A NYISO study conducted in 2010, Growing Wind: Final Report of the NYISO 2010 Wind Generation Study (Sept. 2010), found that the New York power system will allow for the integration of up to 8,000 MW of wind generation with no adverse reliability impacts. At higher levels of wind generation, due to increased variability, the analysis determined that for every 1,000 MW increase between the 4,250 MW and 8,000 MW wind penetration level, the average regulation requirement increases approximately 9 percent. Further, given existing transmission constraints, at the 6,000 MW scenario modeled, 8.8% of the energy production in three areas of upstate New York (Zones C - Central, D - North, and E - Mohawk) would be "bottled" or undeliverable. With upgrades, the amount of bottled wind energy could be reduced to less than 2 percent. A similar bottling pattern was found in the 8,000 MW model. Offshore wind energy, as modeled, is fully deliverable.

In January 2015, Sims Municipal Recycling (a division of Sims Metal Management) inaugurated the New York City's only commercial-scale wind turbine at its recycling center at the South Brooklyn Marine Terminal. Built by Northern Power Systems at the cost of about $750,000, the 160 ft (49 m) tall turbine has the capacity to produce 100 kilowatts, or 4% of the center's power needs.

=== Offshore wind power ===
In 2009, utilities in the state such as the New York Power Authority and Long Island Power Authority were exploring the possibility of large-scale offshore facilities, either in the ocean or in the Great Lakes. In 2011, the New York Power Authority cancelled the Great Lakes Offshore Wind (GLOW) project.

On September 8, 2011, the New York Power Authority, Long Island Power Authority, and Con Edison (the Offshore Wind Collaborative) filed a request with the US Department of the Interior, Bureau of Ocean Energy Management (BOEM) to issue a commercial lease on the outer continental shelf to the New York Power Authority for the development of the Long Island - New York City Offshore Wind Project. This project would be located in the Atlantic Ocean off Nassau County, approximately 13 nautical miles off Rockaway Peninsula, in a long 65,000-acre wedge-shaped area between shipping channels, directionally aligned southwest of Rockaway Peninsula. The project as now configured consists of 97 offshore turbines, with a total nameplate generating capacity of 350 MW. With 194 turbines, generating capacity could be doubled to 700 MW. Given the lengthy permitting process, the Collaborative's proposed project would not be operational until 2018 at the earliest. On January 4, 2013, BOEM issued a Request for Interest (Docket ID: BOEM-2012-0083) to determine whether other parties were interested in developing the same area. In addition to the Collaborative's response, BOEM received letters of interest in a commercial lease for this area from Fishermen's Energy LLC and Energy Management, Inc.

Another offshore wind energy project that would supply electricity to New York is Deepwater ONE. On September 12, 2013, BOEM awarded two commercial offshore wind energy leases, OCS-A-0486 and OCS-A-0487, to Deepwater Wind New England LLC for development of a regional offshore wind energy project. Deepwater ONE (formerly Deepwater Wind Energy Center) would be located in the Atlantic Ocean on 256 square miles on the outer continental shelf, approximately 30 miles east of Montauk, New York, and 15 miles east of Martha's Vineyard, Massachusetts. The project would consist of 150 to 200 turbines with a total nameplate generating capacity of 900 to 1,200 MW. It includes a 98-mile, 600 MW submarine transmission line, a new regional HVDC transmission system, and a New York-Long Island interconnector to link the electrical supply system in New England and Long Island.

In October 2023, New York awarded three additional offshore wind projects with 4,032 MW capacity.

List of NYSERDA-contracted wind projects in New York State
Project	Developer	Capacity (MW)	Projected completion
Beacon Wind	Equinor Wind US LLC	1,230	2028
Empire Wind 2	Equinor Wind US LLC	1,260	2027
Empire Wind 1	Equinor Wind US LLC	816	2026
Sunrise Wind	Sunrise Wind LLC	924	2025
South Fork Wind Farm	Ørsted and Eversource	130	2023
Attentive Energy One	TotalEnergies, Rise Light & Power and Corio Generation	1,404	2030
Community Offshore Wind	RWE Offshore Renewables and National Grid Ventures	1,314 MW	2030
Excelsior Wind	Vineyard Offshore (Copenhagen Infrastructure Partners)	1,314 MW	2030

== Renewable energy incentives ==
=== Renewable Portfolio Standard ===
The New York State Public Service Commission adopted a Renewable Portfolio Standard (RPS) policy in 2004, calling for an increase in renewable energy used in the state from the then-current level of 19.3 percent (largely attributable to legacy hydroelectric power projects) to at least 25 percent by the end of 2013. In 2010, the Commission raised the standard to 30 percent by the end of 2015, and extended the program through 2015. With the RPS program due to sunset in 2015, the Commission has undertaken a program review. Unlike most states with an RPS, New York follows a central procurement model, with the New York State Energy Research and Development Authority (NYSERDA) responsible for meeting the majority of the RPS goals. NYSERDA obtains the bulk of the RPS Attributes (including any and all reductions in harmful pollutants and emissions such as carbon dioxide and oxides of sulfur and nitrogen) through a "Main Tier" competitive procurement of utility-scale renewable resources. A "Customer-Sited Tier," smaller, behind-the-meter resources provided by residential, commercial, institutional, and governmental projects, complements the Main Tier. Voluntary markets, state agency purchases, and Long Island Power Authority purchases make up the balance.

Wind power is the predominant generating technology in the Main Tier, with 21 wind farms generating or expected to generate 1,696 MW of new renewable energy by the end of 2014. As of the end of 2013, 18 wind farms funded through the Main Tier were generating 1,657 MW of new renewable energy.

=== Financial incentives ===
The New York State Energy Research and Development Authority (NYSERDA), through its On-Site Wind Turbine Incentive Program (which began in 2007), is making $13.8 million available in incentives to encourage the installation of residential, commercial, institutional, and governmental end-use wind energy systems. The program runs from December 1, 2012 through December 31, 2015, with completed applications accepted through September 30, 2015. NYSERDA will pay up to 50 percent of the total installed cost of the wind energy system to eligible installers who install new approved, grid-connected systems using qualified equipment in accordance with eligibility requirements. The installer must pass the entire incentive through to the customer. The maximum incentive is $1 million per site or customer, and the maximum turbine size is 2 MW (2,000 kW).

=== Procedural reforms ===
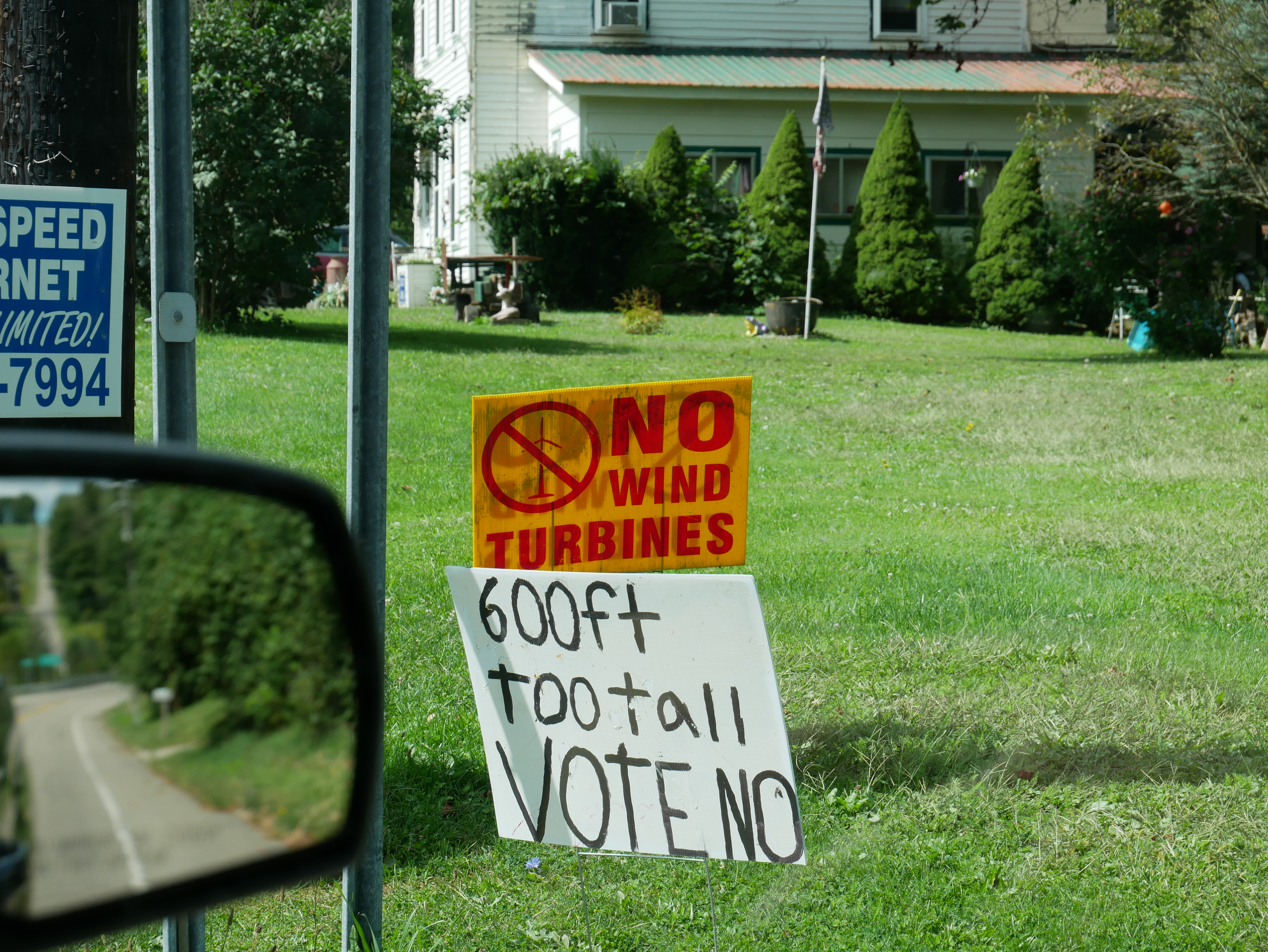
Opposition to utility-scale wind turbines in Chautauqua County

With a strong tradition of home rule and, for many year, no state requirements or guidelines for locating facilities, the siting of large facilities in New York state has generated some controversy, along with myriad, diverse municipal efforts to zone or ban wind farms. Such conditions helped to produce in summer 2009 a Code of Conduct promulgated by the state's Attorney General Andrew Cuomo and embraced by wind developers responsible for a majority of the state's facilities.

In a significant reform aimed at encouraging investment in clean energy technology, Governor Andrew Cuomo on August 4, 2011, signed into law the Power New York Act of 2011, Chapter 388 of the Laws of 2011, enacting Article 10 of the Public Service Law, establishing a unified siting review process for major electric generating facilities; that is, facilities with a generating capacity of 25 MW or more. The New York Department of Public Service and the New York Department of Environmental Conservation adopted implementing regulations on July 17, 2012: Chapter X Certification of Major Electric Generating Facilities, 16 NYCRR Part 1000 and Analyzing Environmental Justice Issues in Siting of Major Electric Generating Facilities, 6 NYCRR Part 487. After July 17, 2012, all applicants for permits to construct major electric generating facilities must follow Article 10. In addition, applicants who had applied for permits or licenses before that date, along with applicants for permits or licenses for certain other types of electric generating facilities excluded from Article 10, may elect to follow Article 10.

Article 10 creates an administrative agency lodged within the Department of Public Service, the Board on Electric Generation Siting and the Environment, to conduct the reviews and make final administrative siting decisions. The Board has seven members; five are agency heads (the "Permanent Board") and two are appointed on a project-specific basis (the local, ad hoc public members). The new law provides a unified review process for the state permits, licenses, and other approvals required to site, construct, and operate a major electric generating facility. Department of Environmental Conservation review of permit applications under federally delegated or approved Clean Air Act, Clean Water Act, and Resource Conservation and Recovery Act programs is coordinated with, and conducted through, the Article 10 review. The Department of State's coastal zone consistency determination is also coordinated with the Article 10 review. Federal permitting and licensing reviews may be coordinated with the Article 10 review. Article 10 provides for consideration of local laws, and Board decisions must provide reasons for deviation from local substantive requirements. Article 10 seeks to promote early and effective public participation in the siting process, facilitating communication between the applicant and interested persons, to minimize later delays and reduce the likelihood of litigation challenging siting decisions. It provides numerous public participation opportunities, including the distribution of "intervenor funds" derived from application fees to enable municipalities and local parties to hire technical experts and lawyers to assist them in participating in the proceeding.

Further, an expansion of the state's net metering laws in 2008 may help to grow the market for small-scale residential, agricultural, or commercial installations.

== Installed capacity ==
New York wind generation by year
Thousand megawatt-hours

New York wind power capacity by year (MW)
Year	Amount	Change	% change
1999	0	0	0%
2000	18.2	18.2	
2001	48.2	30	
2002	48.5	0.3	
2003	48.5	0	0%
2004	48.5	0	0%
2005	185.5	136.5	283%
2006	370.3	185.3	100%
2007	424.8	54.5	15%
2008	831.8	407	96%
2009	1,274.3	442.5	53%
2010	1,274.3	0	0%
2011	1,403	128.7	10%
2012	1,638	235	17%
2013	1,722	84	5%
2014	1,748	26	2%
2015	1,749	1	5%
2016	1,827	78	
2017	1,829	2	1%
2018	1,987	158	8%
2019	1,987	0	0%
2020	1,987		

== Wind generation ==
2013 wind power capacity density by state

New York wind generation (GWh, million kWh)
Year	Total	Jan	Feb	Mar	Apr	May	Jun	Jul	Aug	Sep	Oct	Nov	Dec
2001	23	2	1	2	2	2	2	2	2	2	2	2	2
2002	82	5	5	5	5	5	6	6	6	5	5	5	24
2003	41	3	3	4	3	3	3	3	3	3	4	4	5
2004	118	13	11	13	11	10	7	6	5	6	9	12	15
2005	102	9	9	11	8	6	5	5	5	8	8	15	13
2006	656	59	61	54	55	42	33	46	38	47	68	53	100
2007	832	84	93	107	87	45	50	44	51	55	65	73	78
2008	1,251	109	85	88	83	110	157	88	62	68	94	99	208
2009	2,266	163	208	176	298	222	96	153	128	134	184	202	302
2010	2,595	230	206	238	236	196	173	157	157	235	255	257	255
2011	2,831	178	326	312	325	187	173	146	157	151	242	330	304
2012	2,992	394	308	321	274	168	206	123	149	184	271	242	352
2013	3,539	422	290	312	404	280	207	145	180	205	299	445	350
2014	3,968	456	368	399	443	288	189	236	185	239	362	472	331
2015	3,977	488	343	440	395	318	220	184	195	189	390	415	401
2016	3,940	480	437	388	257	236	278	219	214	195	327	371	538
2017	4,236	368	384	427	418	360	327	249	218	250	409	479	347
2018	3,998	451	427	305	360	323	244	233	241	260	381	389	384
2019	4,457	465	414	471	449	301	328	242	255	278	393	372	489
2020	4,523	385	391	472	451	318	242	273	247	352	376	563	453
2021	4,389	315	378	535	382	325	343	233	239	341	366	415	517
2022	4,788	417	485	507	462	355	327	299	239	268	406	510	513
2023	1,489	368	568	553									

Teal background indicates the largest wind generation month for the year.

Green background indicates the largest wind generation month to date.

== See also ==
- Solar power in New York
- New York energy law
- Wind power in the United States
- Renewable energy in the United States
