= Popponesset, Massachusetts =

- Census-designated place
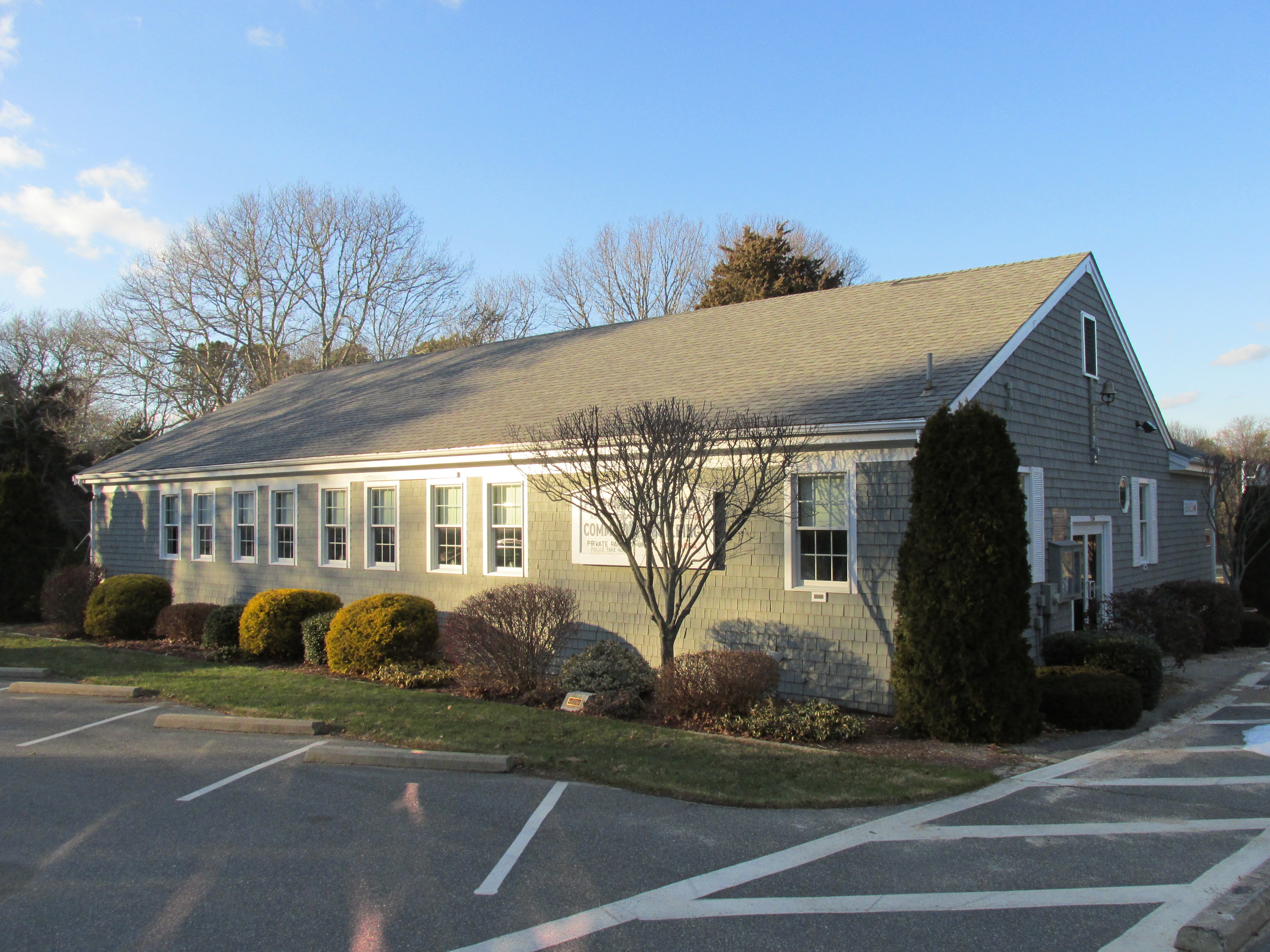
- Community Building

- Location in Barnstable County and the state of Massachusetts.
- Coordinates: 41°34′26″N 70°27′48″W
- Country: United States
- State: Massachusetts
- County: Barnstable
- Town: Mashpee

Area
  - Total: 0.32 sq mi (0.82 km^{2})
  - Land: 0.30 sq mi (0.77 km^{2})
  - Water: 0.019 sq mi (0.05 km^{2})
- Elevation: 13 ft (4.0 m)

Population (2020)
  - Total: 280
  - Density: 937.5/sq mi (361.98/km^{2})
- Time zone: UTC-5 (Eastern (EST))
  - Summer (DST): UTC-4 (EDT)
- ZIP Code: 02649 (Mashpee)
- FIPS code: 25-55070
- GNIS feature ID: 2378205

Popponesset is a census-designated place (CDP) in the town of Mashpee on Cape Cod in Barnstable County, Massachusetts, United States. As of the 2020 census, Popponesset had a population of 280. The area is part of the New Seabury community, but is treated separately for census purposes.

== Geography ==
Popponesset is located in the southern part of the town of Mashpee. It is shown on topographic maps as Popponesset Beach. It is bordered to the north and west by the New Seabury CDP and to the northeast, across Popponesset Creek, by the Popponesset Island CDP. Its southern edge is Nantucket Sound, into which extends the Popponesset Spit, separating it from Popponesset Bay.

According to the United States Census Bureau, the Popponesset CDP has a total area of 0.31 square miles (0.8 km^{2}), of which 0.012 square miles (0.03 km^{2}), or 3.66%, is water.

== Climate ==
In a typical year, Popponesset, Massachusetts temperatures fall below 50 °F (10 °C) for 167 days per year. Annual precipitation is typically 45.2 inches per year (high in the US) and snow covers the ground 0 days per year, or 0% of the year (the lowest in the US). It may be helpful to understand the yearly precipitation by imagining nine straight days of moderate rain per year. The humidity is below 60% for approximately 27.6 days, or 7.6% of the year.

== Demographics ==
Historical population
Census	Pop.	Note	%±
2020	280		—
U.S. Decennial Census

At the 2000 census there were 310 people in 167 households, including 102 families, in the CDP. The population density was 399.0/km^{2} (1,046.0/mi^{2}). There were 624 housing units at an average density of 803.1/km^{2} (2,105.5/mi^{2}). The racial makeup of the CDP was 100.00% White. Of the 167 households 7.2% had children under the age of 18 living with them, 51.5% were married couples living together, 6.6% had a female householder with no husband present, and 38.9% were non-families. 34.7% of households were one person and 22.8% were one person aged 65 or older. The average household size was 1.86 and the average family size was 2.29.

The age distribution was 7.1% under the age of 18, 3.9% from 18 to 24, 12.3% from 25 to 44, 26.5% from 45 to 64, and 50.3% 65 or older. The median age was 65 years. For every 100 females, there were 85.6 males. For every 100 females age 18 and over, there were 80.0 males.

The median household income was $48,250 and the median family income was $49,350. Males had a median income of $51,023 versus $23,661 for females. The per capita income for the CDP was $27,805. None of the population or families were below the poverty line.
