= Maple Ridge Wind Farm =

Wind farm in New York, United States

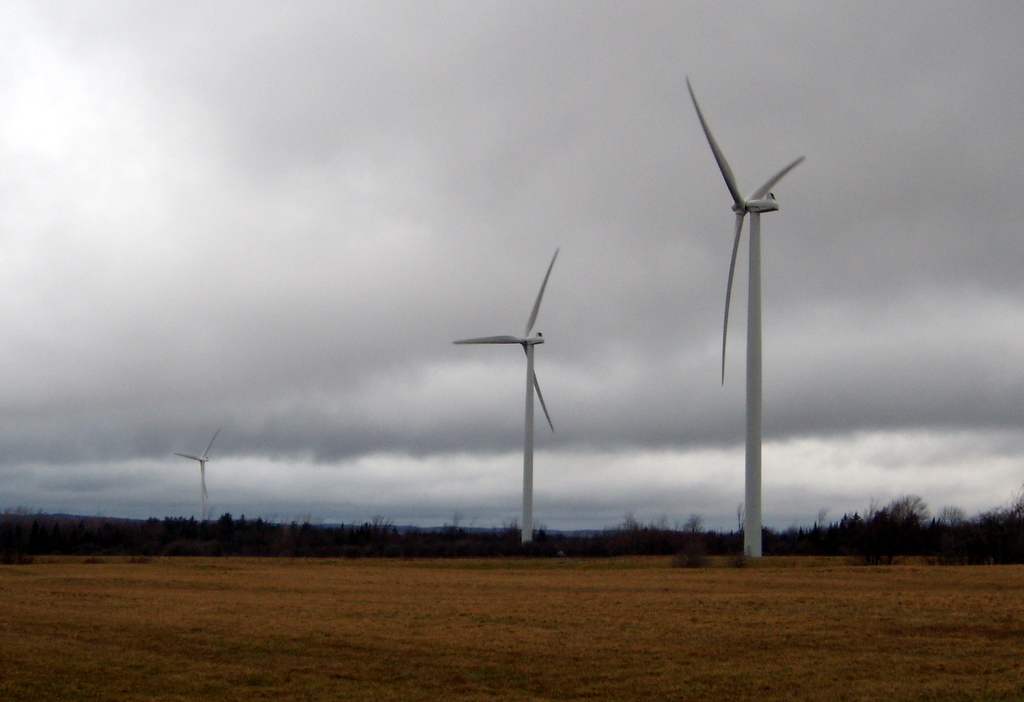
- Country: United States
- Location: Lewis County, New York
- Coordinates: 43°47′07″N 75°34′31″W
- Status: Operational
- Construction began: 2005
- Commission date: June 2006
- Owners: Avangrid Renewables, EDP Renewables North America

Wind farm
- Type: Onshore

Power generation
- Units operational: 195 turbines
- Make and model: Vestas V82-1.65 MW
- Nameplate capacity: 321.75 MW
- Capacity factor: 26.6% (average 2007-2018)
- Annual net output: 749 GW·h

External links
- Website: mapleridgewindfarm.co

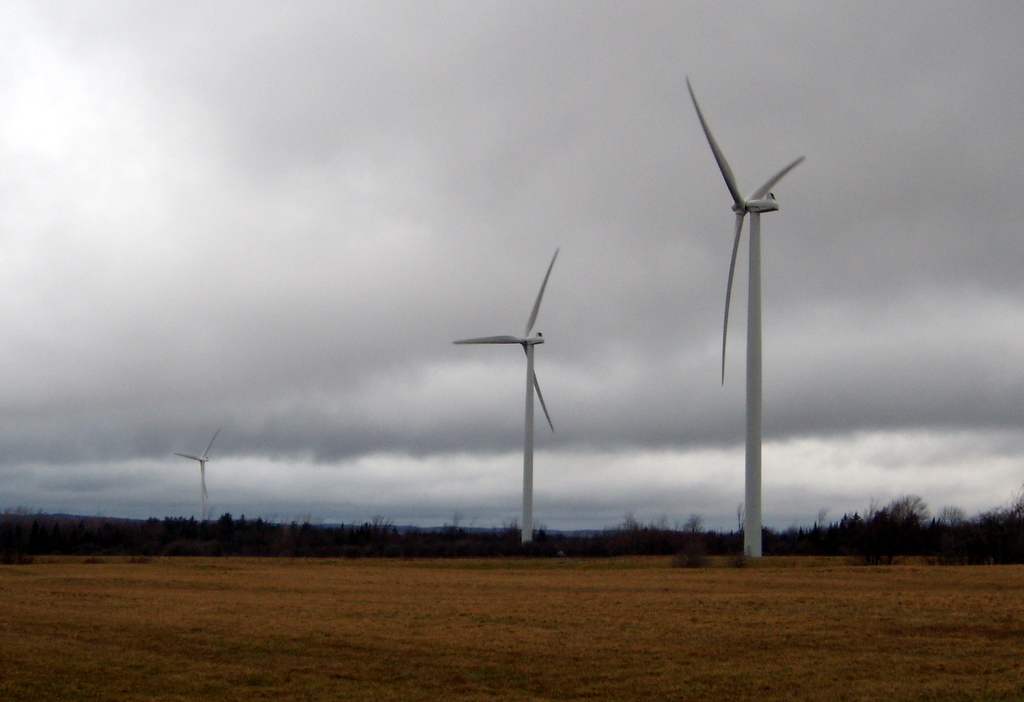
A few of the 195 Vestas V82 1.65 MW wind turbines; the height at the tip of the blade reaches 390 feet (120 m).

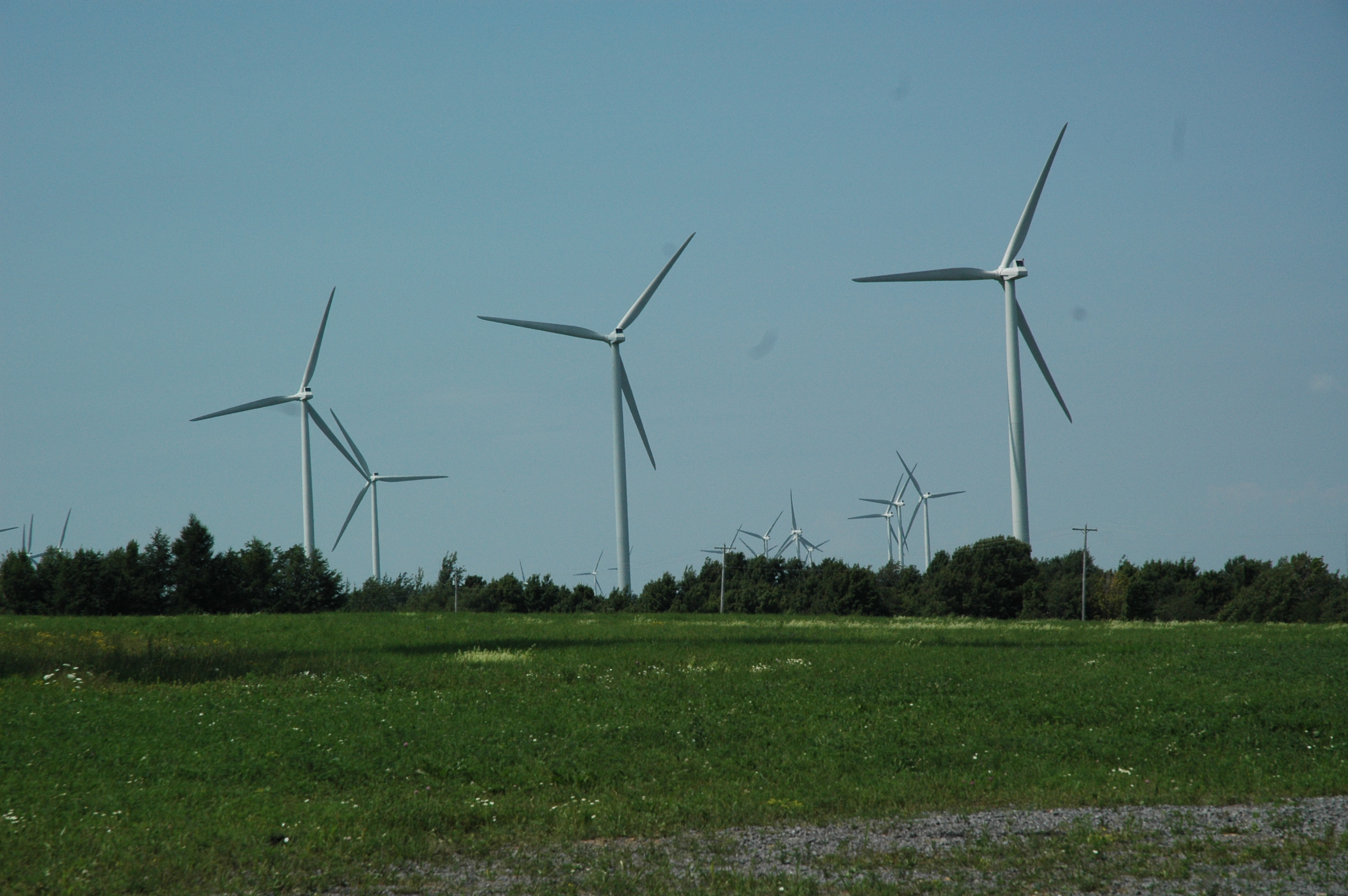
Turbines of the farm, taken in 2007

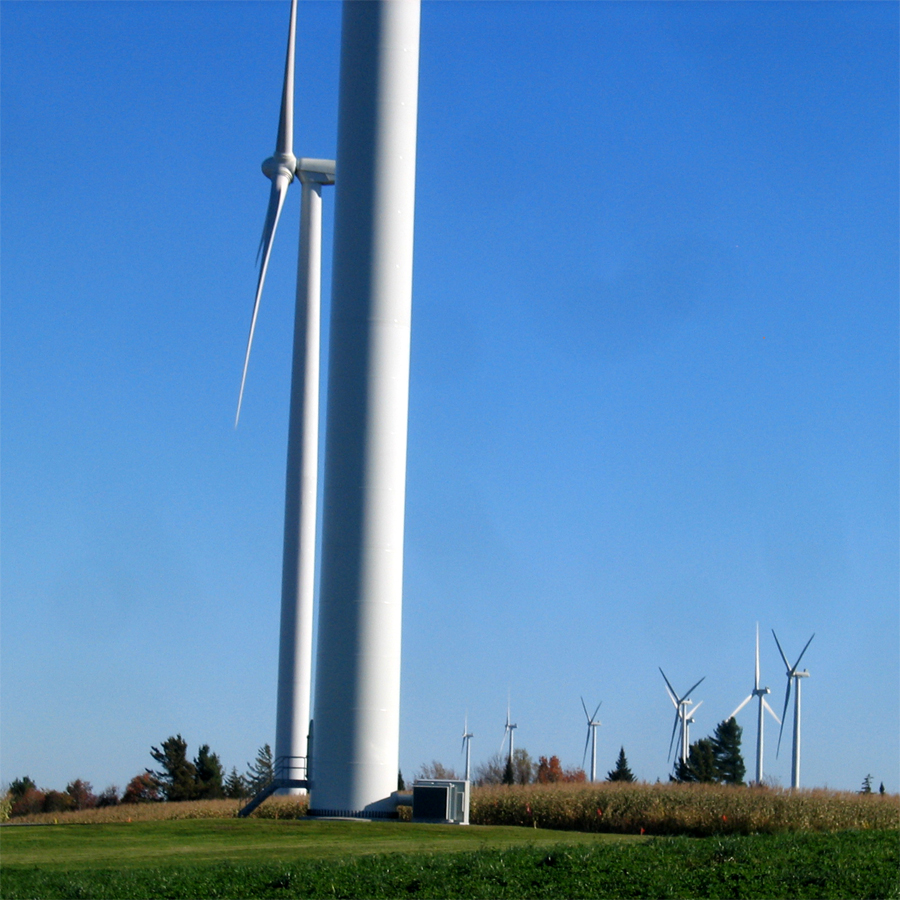
Close-up of a tower base section

Maple Ridge Wind Farm is the largest wind farm in the state of New York in the United States. Located on Tug Hill in Lewis County, the facility has 195 wind turbines. At full operation, the turbines can produce a maximum of 321.75 megawatts (MW) of electricity.

== Description ==
Maple Ridge Wind Farm, which achieved full operation in 2006, is a facility with 195 Vestas model V82 1.65 MW wind turbines. The Danish model machines were shipped in parts by sea to the United States, and via the St. Lawrence Seaway to Lake Ontario, where they were unloaded at the Oswego Port Authority. They were transported by numerous trucks to the area of the farm near Lowville, New York.

Each turbine tower is 260 feet (79 m) tall. Each turbine has blades 130 feet (40 m) long, which added to the hub diameter gives a rotor diameter of 270 feet (82 m). Collectively, the turbines can produce a maximum of nearly 322 MW.

Maple Ridge Wind Farm became fully operational in June 2006.

The wind farm is located on Tug Hill in Lewis County, New York. The site was chosen because it lies at an elevation of 1,600–1,800 feet (490–550 m); strong winds are part of the area's lake-effect weather patterns generated by nearby Lake Ontario.

Maple Ridge Wind Farm was named in honor of Lewis County's maple syrup production, for which it ranks as the top county in New York. The company generally leased a total of 21,000 acres (85 km^{2}) of land for its facility, in an area used primarily as pasture and for the cultivation of feed-crops. NPR reported mixed reactions among the neighbors to the wind farm operations.

== Electricity production ==
Maple Ridge Wind Electricity Generation (MW·h)
Year	Total Annual MW·h
2005	2,550
2006	543,936
2007	707,797
2008	751,386
2009	718,696
2010	701,519
2011	750,174
2012	723,940
2013	751,393
2014	813,135
2015	783,219
2016	764,322
2017	786,732
2018	739,631
Average (2007–2018) --->	749,329

== See also ==
- New York energy law
- Wind power in New York
- Wind power in the United States
