= Eagle, New York =

- Town
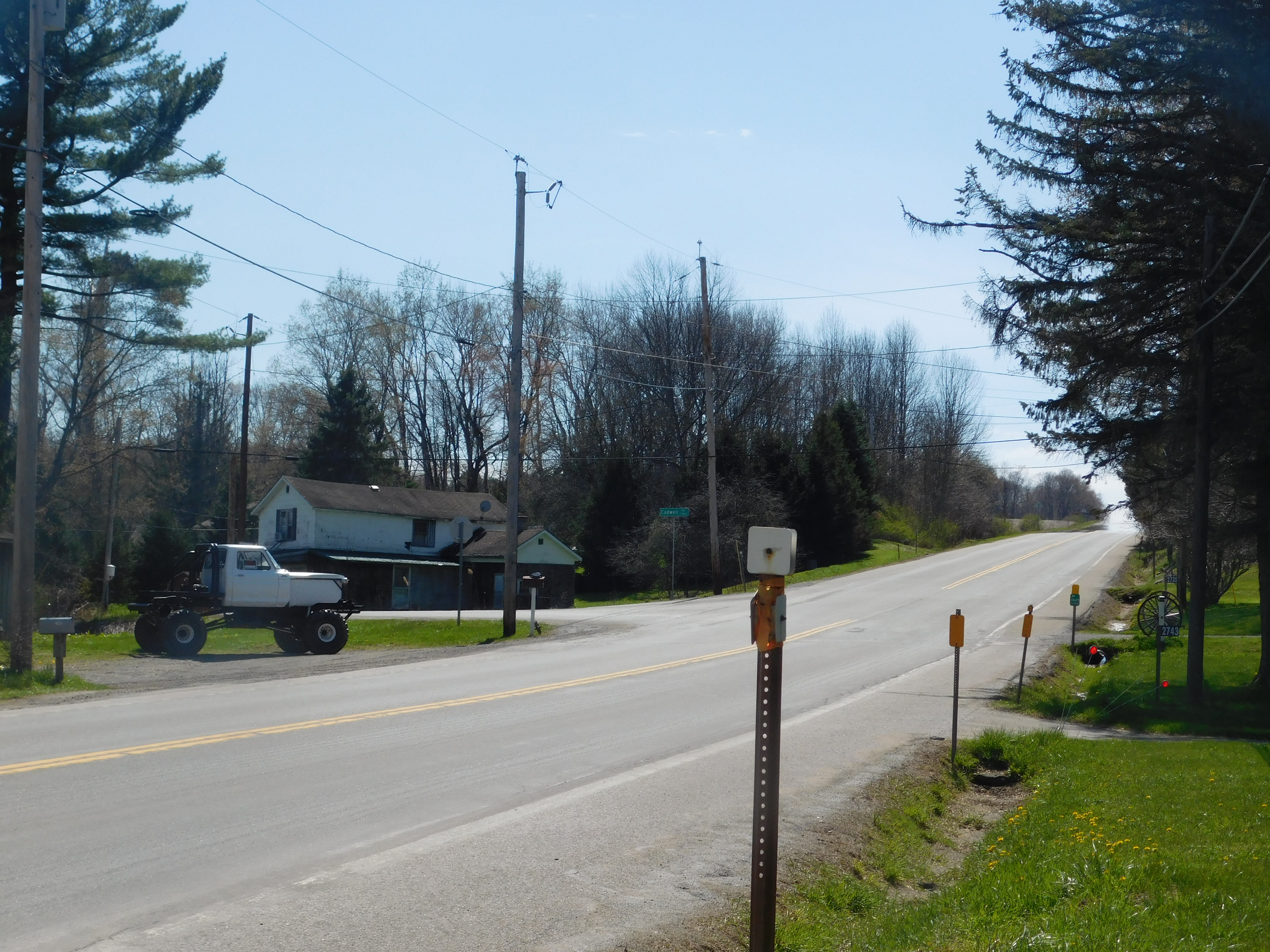
- Route 39 westbound in Eagle hamlet.

- Location within Wyoming County and New York

- Location within the state of New York Eagle (the United States)
- Coordinates: 42°34′4″N 78°15′17″W
- Country: United States
- State: New York
- County: Wyoming

Government
  - Town Supervisor: Brett Hastings (R)

Area
  - Total: 36.47 sq mi (94.46 km^{2})
  - Land: 36.28 sq mi (93.97 km^{2})
  - Water: 0.19 sq mi (0.49 km^{2})
- Elevation: 1,913 ft (583 m)

Population (2010)
  - Total: 1,192
  - Estimate (2016): 1,168
  - Density: 32.2/sq mi (12.43/km^{2})
- Time zone: UTC-5 (Eastern (EST))
  - Summer (DST): UTC-4 (EDT)
- FIPS code: 36-21369
- GNIS feature ID: 0978914

Eagle is an incorporated town in Wyoming County, New York. The population was 1,194 at the 2000 census. The town is on the south border of the county.

== History ==
The town of Eagle was established in 1817 from a division of the town of Arcade.

== Geography ==
According to the United States Census Bureau, the town has a total area of 36.5 square miles (95 km^{2}), of which 36.4 square miles (94 km^{2}) is land and 0.1 square miles (0.26 km^{2}) (0.38%) is water.

Due to a prevailing wind, Eagle is the home of the Bliss Wind Farm.

The south town line is the border of Allegany County, New York.

== Demographics ==
Historical population
Census	Pop.	Note	%±
1840	1,187		—
1850	1,381		16.3%
1860	1,312		−5.0%
1870	1,040		−20.7%
1880	1,203		15.7%
1890	1,131		−6.0%
1900	1,114		−1.5%
1910	1,141		2.4%
1920	1,059		−7.2%
1930	960		−9.3%
1940	922		−4.0%
1950	868		−5.9%
1960	896		3.2%
1970	996		11.2%
1980	1,216		22.1%
1990	1,155		−5.0%
2000	1,194		3.4%
2010	1,192		−0.2%
2016 (est.)	1,168		−2.0%
U.S. Decennial Census

As of the census of 2000, there were 1,194 people, 424 households, and 326 families residing in the town. The population density was 32.8 inhabitants per square mile (12.7/km^{2}). There were 535 housing units at an average density of 14.7 per square mile (5.7/km^{2}). The racial makeup of the town was 98.66% White, 0.25% African American, 0.08% Native American, 0.17% Asian, and 0.84% from two or more races. Hispanic or Latino of any race were 0.08% of the population.

There were 424 households, out of which 37.7% had children under the age of 18 living with them, 63.2% were married couples living together, 10.4% had a female householder with no husband present, and 23.1% were non-families. 18.6% of all households were made up of individuals, and 7.3% had someone living alone who was 65 years of age or older. The average household size was 2.82 and the average family size was 3.21.

In the town, the population was spread out, with 30.8% under the age of 18, 4.9% from 18 to 24, 30.9% from 25 to 44, 23.4% from 45 to 64, and 10.0% who were 65 years of age or older. The median age was 36 years. For every 100 females, there were 99.7 males. For every 100 females age 18 and over, there were 96.7 males.

The median income for a household in the town was $36,765, and the median income for a family was $41,116. Males had a median income of $32,007 versus $22,216 for females. The per capita income for the town was $20,829. About 6.7% of families and 11.3% of the population were below the poverty line, including 17.3% of those under age 18 and 4.8% of those age 65 or over.

The population of cows in Eagle is larger than the human population.

== Communities and locations in Eagle ==
- Bliss – A hamlet and census-designated place at the Route 39 and 362 junction.
- Eagle – The hamlet of Eagle is on Route 39 near the border with the town of Arcade.
- Eagle Center – A hamlet on Centerville and Telegraph Roads, south of Bliss, known locally as Todwaddle.
