= Popponesset Bay =

Bay in Massachusetts, United States

Coordinates: 41°35′30″N 70°27′33″W

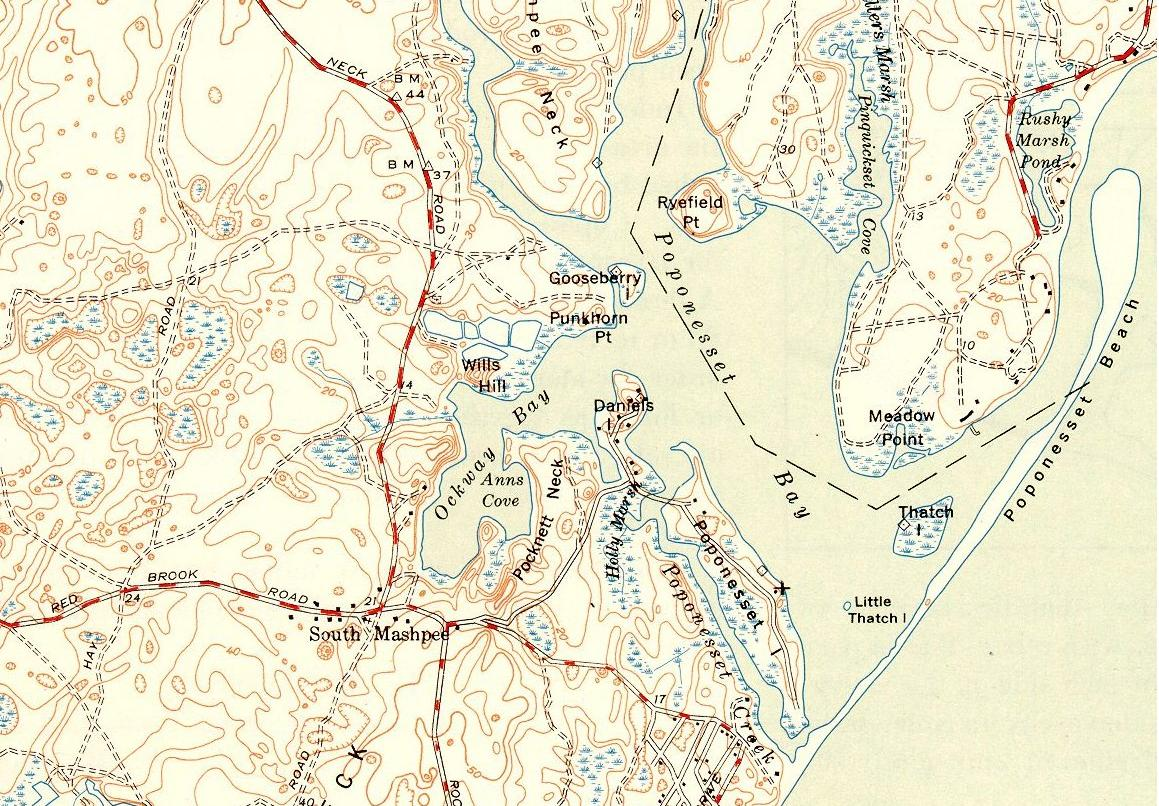
The Popponesset Bay System

Popponesset Bay System is a group of bays located at the towns of Mashpee (north & west) and Barnstable (east), on Cape Cod, Massachusetts with a southern shore bounded by water from Nantucket Sound.

Popponesset Bay has the following tributary sub-embayments:

- Ockway Bay
- Shoestring Bay
- Mashpee River Estuary
- Pinquickset Cove

The bay system is fed by the Mashpee River and Santuit River. Popponesset Creek is not a tributary but rather connects with the bay on both ends and separates Popponesset Island from the mainland.

The bay's watershed is distributed among the towns of Mashpee, Barnstable and Sandwich, Massachusetts. The town of Sandwich does have jurisdiction over land and associated land uses in the uppermost portions of the Popponesset Bay watershed. Portions of the Popponesset Bay watershed that exist within the Town of Sandwich are mostly situated above the Mashpee and Wakeby Ponds.

Popponesset Bay has experienced problems with eutrophication from high nitrogen loads in the groundwater and runoff from the watersheds.

The present bay results from tidal flooding of drowned river valleys formed primarily by the Mashpee and Santuit Rivers as a result of a risen sea level. The Bay is separated from Nantucket Sound by Popponesset Peninsula, a barrier spit which extends from the southwestern shore and is mostly occupied by Popponesset Beach. Popponesset Beach is known to the locals as simply "The Spit."

Popponesset Bay has a second beach in the form of a sand bar in the middle of the bay, which is submersed during high tide. This island is known as Low Tide Island.

The bay exchanges tidal water with Nantucket Sound through a single maintained inlet. The shore to the north of the inlet has been stabilized with riprap as has the heavily residential southern portion of Popponesset Beach. The current spit is significantly shorter than seen in the 1880 Barnstable County survey.

The village of Popponesset takes its name from these waters.
