= Solar power in New York =

Overview of solar power in the U.S. state of New York

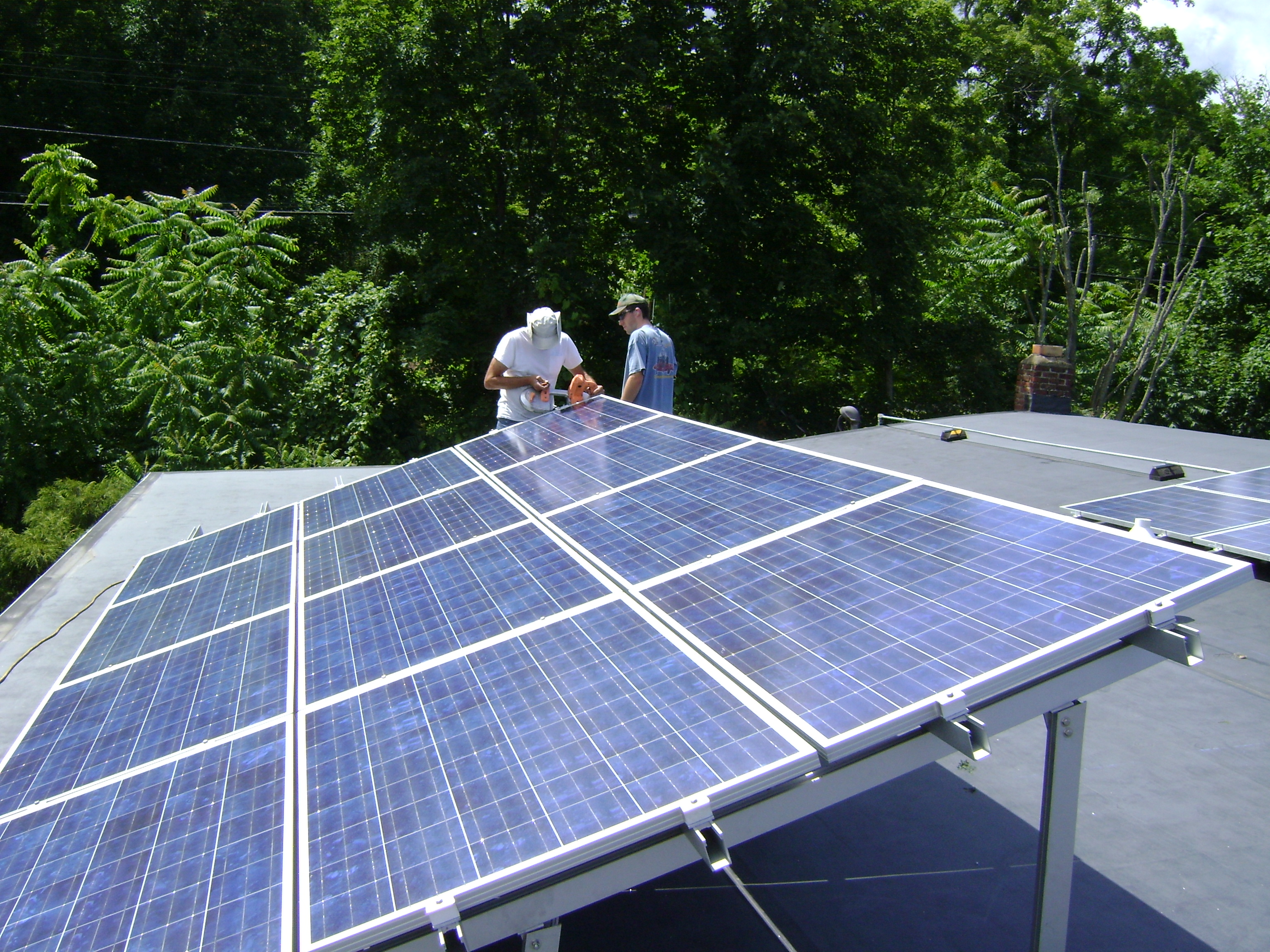
Installing rooftop solar panels in Poughkeepsie

New York had a renewable portfolio standard of 30% from renewable sources by 2015. In 2015, 24% was renewable, 6% short of the goal. Wind is the predominant generating technology. In 2018, the New York State Energy Research and Development Authority awarded long-term contracts to 22 utility-scale solar farms, totaling a combined capacity of 646 MW.

In 2012, LIPA adopted a power purchase agreement (limited to 50 MW), which paid $0.22/kWh for solar generation for installations ranging from 50 kW to 20 MW. A $500 to $5000 application fee favored larger power plants and represented roughly the first 10 days of generation for a 50 kW to 500 kW system, but less than 2 hours of generation for a 20 MW installation. The term of the agreement was 20 years, and systems had to be interconnected to the grid at the 13.2 kV level. Unlike the feed-in tariff programs in many other places, customers paid for their own electricity as if they were not generating any, making this actually a power purchase agreement, and not a feed-in tariff. LIPA owned the SRECs (which could be worth more than they were paying for the electricity). A bill to establish SRECs in New York failed to pass in 2012 . 50 MW of solar power would meet the average needs of about 7,000 households, or less than 1% of the electricity supplied by LIPA. 5 MW was reserved for systems less than 150 kW, and 10 MW for systems from 150 to 500 kW. The remaining 35 MW was available to systems of all sizes. If fully subscribed in the first year, the average household would pay an estimated $0.44/month to pay for the program, which would generate an estimated 79.4 million kWh/year. Estimated costs were based on an average avoided cost rate of $0.075/kWh, although peak generation costs could exceed $0.22/kWh, eliminating any cost. LIPA's total generation capacity, in 2011, was 6,800 MW.

In 2023, the New York State Energy Research and Development Authority approved 14 new large-scale solar projects, totaling more than 1 gigawatt of capacity.

As of December 2025, solar power supplies electricity to approximately 1.27 million homes in New York, accounting for 6.56% of the state's total electricity generation.

New York has one of the largest community solar program, with more than 1,700 MW installed, providing savings to more than 400,000 customers.

New York remained the leading community solar market nationally in 2025, adding 624 MWdc of new capacity despite a 20% year-over-year decline, as cumulative U.S. community solar installations surpassed 10 GWdc for the first time.

New York's largest solar project, Morris Ridge Solar, came online in December 2024 with 229 MWdc/177 MWac.

== Statistics ==
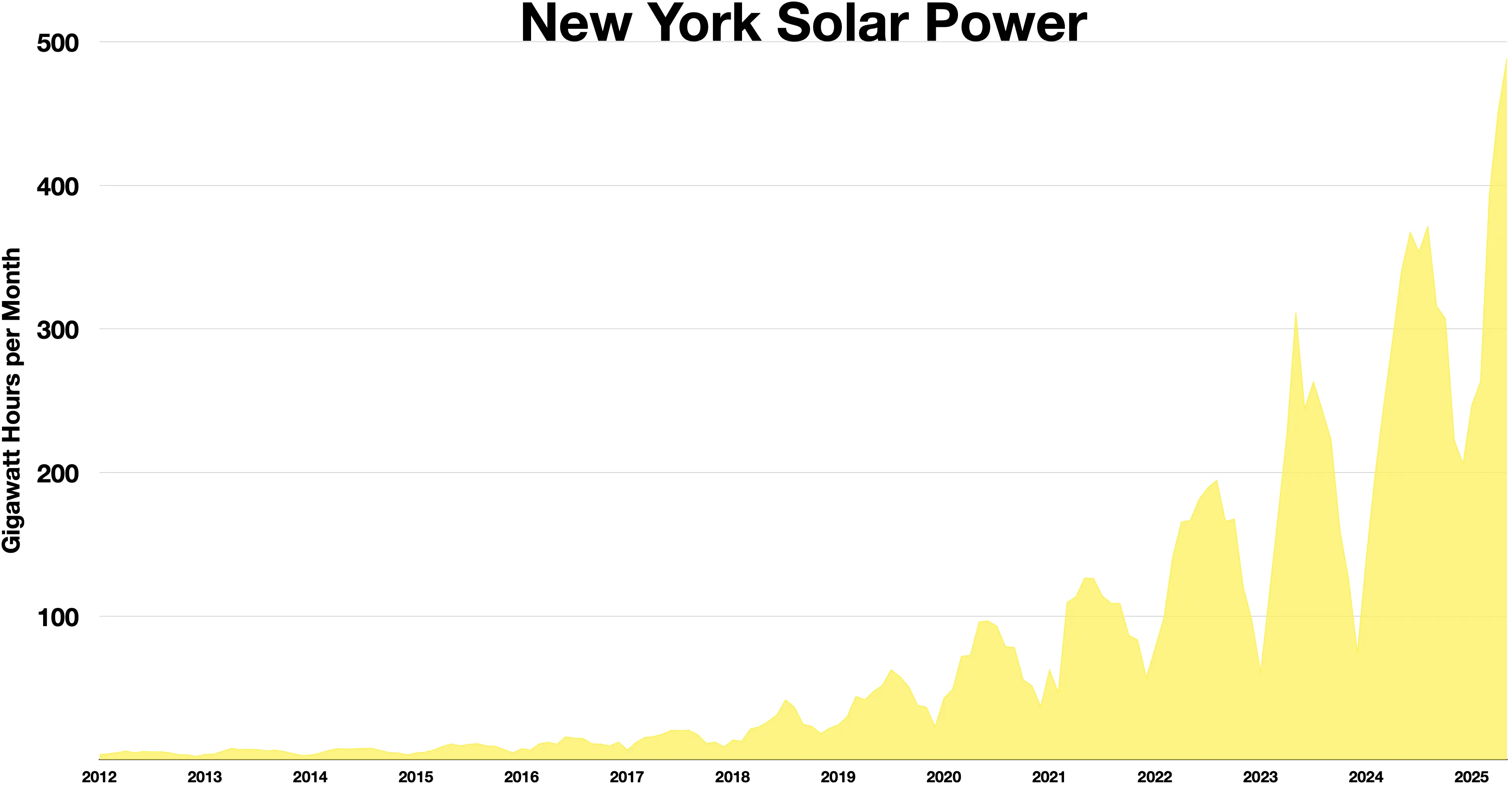
New York solar power

Installed photovoltaics (MW)
Year	Total	Installed
2007	15.4	
2008	21.9	6.5
2009	33.9	12
2010	55.5	21.6
2011	123.8	68.3
2012	179.4	55.6
2013	240.5	61.1
2014	397	147
2015	638	241
2016	937	186
2017	1,038	101
2018	1,073	35 (partial)
2019	1,571	498
2020	2,724.4	1,153.4
2021	3,380.6	656.2
2022	4,259	878.4
2023	5,560	937
2024		861

Utility-scale solar generation in New York (GWh)
Year	Total	Jan	Feb	Mar	Apr	May	Jun	Jul	Aug	Sep	Oct	Nov	Dec
2011	6	0	0	0	0	0	0	0	0	0	0	3	3
2012	52	3	4	5	6	5	6	5	5	5	3	3	2
2013	53	4	4	6	8	7	7	7	6	7	6	4	3
2014	72	3	4	6	8	7	8	8	8	6	5	5	3
2015	101	5	5	7	9	11	10	11	11	10	10	7	5
2016	139	8	7	11	12	11	16	15	15	11	11	10	12
2017	182	7	12	16	16	18	21	21	21	18	11	12	9
2018	297	14	13	22	23	27	31	42	37	25	23	18	22
2019	524	25	31	46	43	49	54	65	60	52	39	37	23
2020	839	44	50	73	74	98	99	95	80	80	57	52	37
2021	1,159	63	47	111	115	128	128	116	111	110	88	84	58
2022	1,787	78	99	143	168	169	184	192	197	168	169	122	98
2023	2,235	61	117	173	229	314	246	265	245	224	161	126	74
2024	3,128	62	181	222	254	355	358	389	343	349	310	197	108
2025		261	274	409	462	497	546	588	588	494	422	324	

== See also ==
- List of power stations in New York
- Wind power in New York
- Solar 1
- Solar power in the United States
- Renewable energy in the United States
