= Energy Management Inc =

Energy Management Inc (EMI) is a Boston-based energy company that was founded by Jim Gordon in 1975. EMI began as a marketing company for existing energy conservation and management products. The company eventually hired its own engineers and began to design custom energy solutions for New England manufacturing companies, and later began building its own power generation facilities. In the 1980s, EMI became one of the first developers of natural gas-fired power plants in New England. Most recently, EMI is the developer of the proposed Cape Wind project in Nantucket Sound.

== History ==
Jim Gordon founded EMI during the 1970s energy crisis when he realized that energy would be an important issue in the future. EMI sold existing energy conservation products on the market to Boston area companies hurting from the high energy prices. EMI then started to hire engineers and develop custom solutions that would help its clients save money by conserving and re-using energy. This strategy was effective while energy prices remained high and companies were looking for ways to save on energy costs. But when energy prices fell in the 1980s, the company could no longer survive on this business alone.

=== Natural Gas ===
With the passage of the National Energy Act in 1978, small energy producers were allowed and incentivized to compete in the U.S. energy production market. EMI took advantage of this legislation and built a wood-chip powered electric plant in Alexandria, New Hampshire which opened in 1986. EMI then built 3 more natural gas powered plants. In the early 1990s, the Federal Energy Regulatory Commission made the energy market more open and competitive. It allowed the sale of electricity on the wholesale market in 1992 and then allowed open access to the electric transmission system to producers in 1995. EMI positioned itself to profit from this deregulation by building three new merchant natural gas powered plants that would be financed without a long-term contract for purchase of its electricity. EMI built these merchant plants in Dighton, Massachusetts (commissioned in July 1999), Rhode Island, and Maine. EMI sold all of its plants by 2001.

=== Cape Wind ===
In 2001 Gordon proposed an offshore farm of wind turbines in Nantucket Sound. The proposed 500-megawatt, 130 turbine Cape Wind project quickly became controversial due to community concerns over the project. Cape Wind received federal approval by the U.S. Secretary of the Interior Ken Salazar on April 28, 2010.
