= Arkwright Summit Wind Farm =

Wind farm in Arkwright, New York, United States

Coordinates: 42.436656°N 79.307121°W

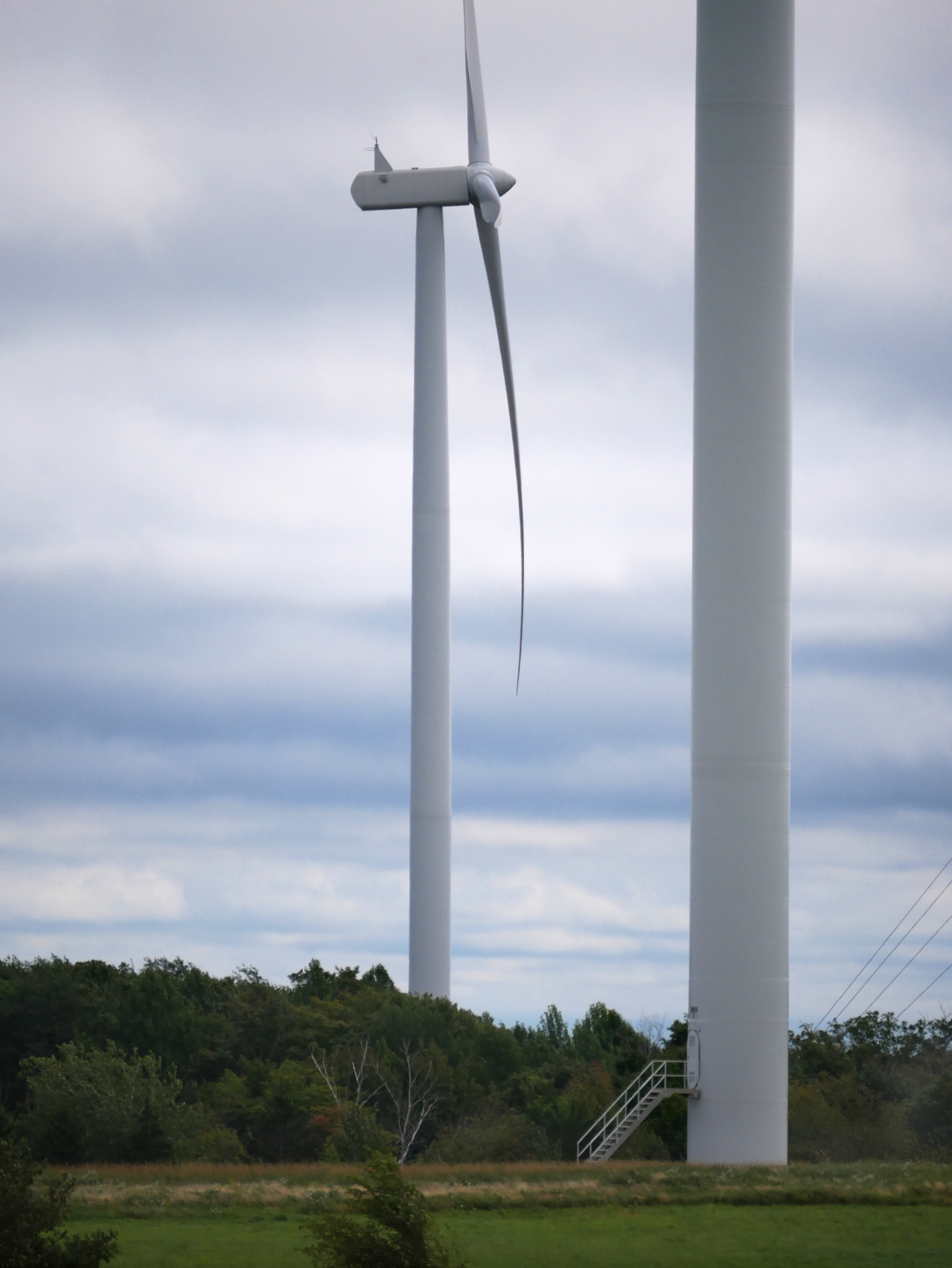
Two turbines in the Arkwright Summit Wind Farm

The Arkwright Summit Wind Farm is a 78.4 megawatt wind farm in Arkwright, New York. It uses 36 Vestas V110 turbines, 32 of which are rated at 2.2 megawatts and 4 of which are rated at 2.0 megawatts. The wind farm provides power for about 35,000 New York homes. The wind farm is located in Chautauqua County, within the Town of Arkwright, and the project connects to the grid in the Town of Pomfret. It was installed in 2018 and was developed and operated by EDP Renewables.

== 2019 Lawsuit ==
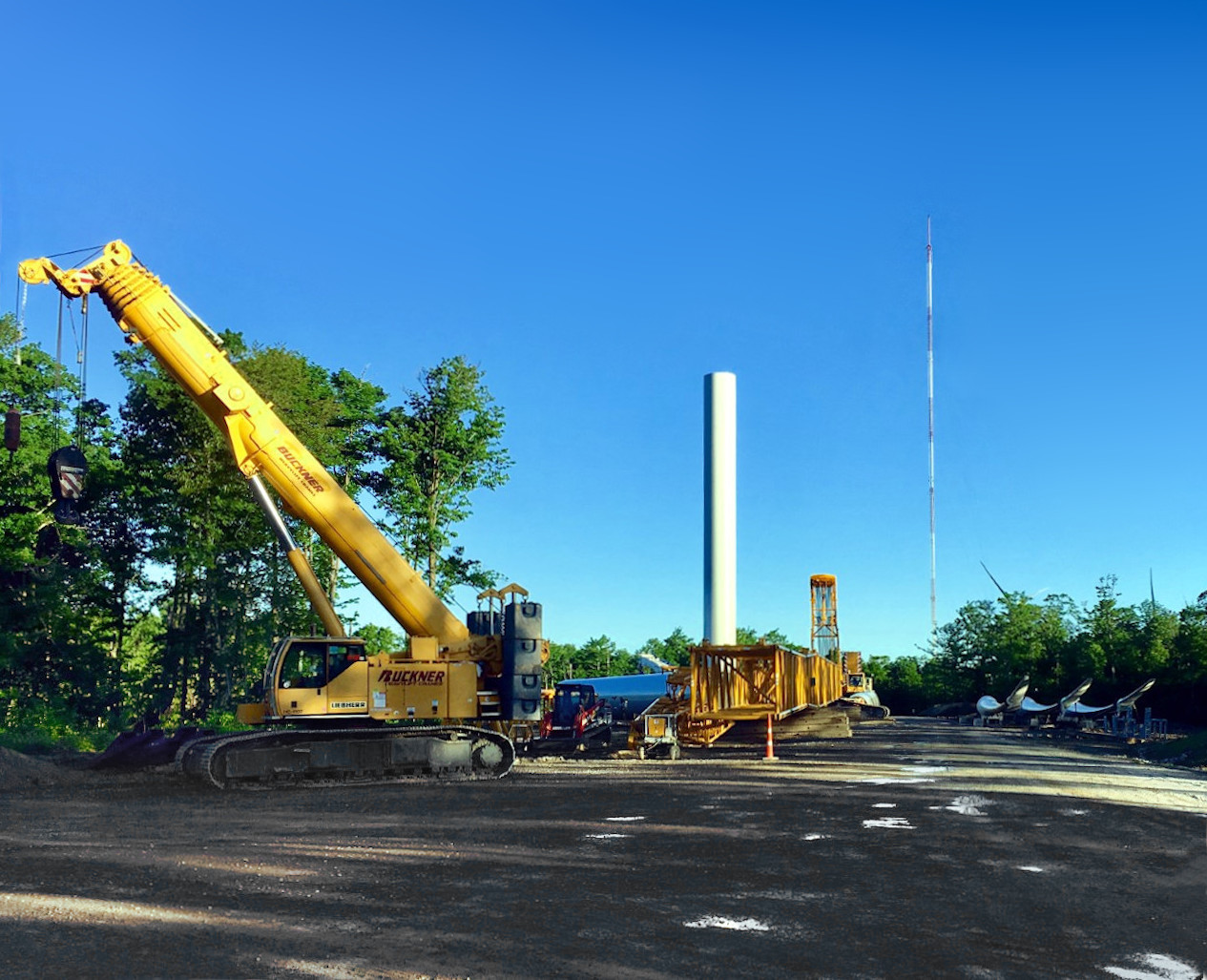
Arkwright Summit Wind Farm under construction in 2018.

In September 2019, over one hundred residents and landowners filed a lawsuit in the Supreme Court of New York against EDP Renewables, citing ill health effects due to turbine placement too close to homes, and diminished property values.

== See also ==
- New York energy law
