= Wind Over Water =

Wind Over Water: The Cape Wind Story
- Directed by: Ole Tangen Jr.
- Release date: 2003
- Country: United States
- Language: English

Wind Over Water: The Cape Wind Story is an independent documentary film which chronicles the controversy over the Cape Wind Project. The film, by journalist Ole Tangen Jr. documented both sides of the debate as it unfolded on the Cape. An independent production, the filmmaker interviewed numerous people involved with the project including Jim Gordon of Cape Wind and Isaac Rosen, then director of the Alliance to Protect Nantucket Sound.

Focusing also on wind power in general, Wind Over Water features aerial footage of the offshore wind farm at Horns Rev in Denmark and footage from various wind farms in the US.

The film had its world premiere on December 6, 2003, at Lillie Auditorium, Woods Hole, MA. It has also been screened across the USA and in Canada and New Zealand.

== See also ==
- Alliance to Protect Nantucket Sound
- Cape Cod
- Cape Wind Associates
- Cape Wind Project
