= Popponesset Island, Massachusetts =

Popponesset Island
- Census-designated place
- Location in Barnstable County and the state of Massachusetts.
- Coordinates: 41°35′8″N 70°27′32″W
- Country: United States
- State: Massachusetts
- County: Barnstable
- Town: Mashpee

Area
  - Total: 0.38 sq mi (0.99 km^{2})
  - Land: 0.073 sq mi (0.19 km^{2})
  - Water: 0.31 sq mi (0.80 km^{2})
- Elevation: 0 ft (0 m)

Population (2020)
  - Total: 45
  - Density: 625.3/sq mi (241.42/km^{2})
- Time zone: UTC−5 (Eastern (EST))
  - Summer (DST): UTC−4 (EDT)
- ZIP Code: 02649
- FIPS code: 25-55090
- GNIS feature ID: 2378206

Popponesset Island is an island and census-designated place (CDP) in the town of Mashpee in Barnstable County, Massachusetts, United States. As of the 2020 census, Popponesset Island had a population of 45.

== Geography ==
Popponesset Island is located in the southeastern part of the town of Mashpee. It lies in Popponesset Bay, an arm of Nantucket Sound, and is separated from the mainland of Cape Cod by the narrow Popponesset Creek. The CDP of New Seabury is to the west, across Popponesset Creek, and the Popponesset CDP is to the southwest. The town of Barnstable is to the northeast, across Popponesset Bay.

According to the United States Census Bureau, the Popponesset Island CDP has a total area of 0.39 square miles (1.0 km^{2}), of which 0.077 square miles (0.2 km^{2}) is land, and 0.31 square miles (0.8 km^{2}) (81.16%) is water.

== History ==
During World War II, Popponesset Island was used for amphibious assault training.

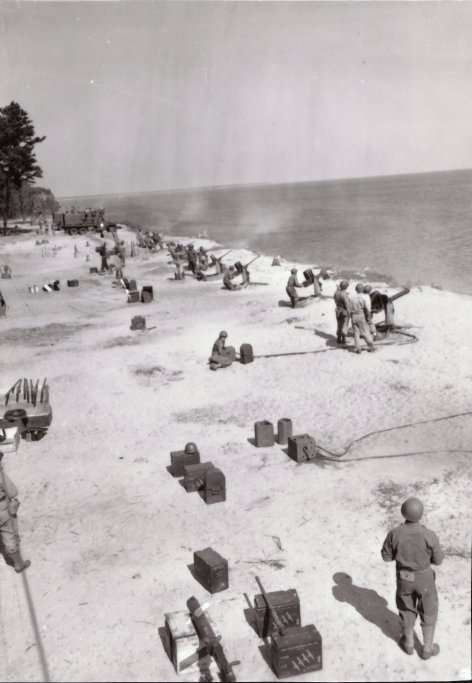
Trainees conduct artillery training.

== Demographics ==
Historical population
Census	Pop.	Note	%±
2020	45		—
U.S. Decennial Census

At the 2000 census there were 39 people, 19 households, and 12 families living in the CDP. The population density was 188.2/km^{2} (502.1/mi^{2}). There were 69 housing units at an average density of 333.0/km^{2} (888.3/mi^{2}). The racial makeup of the CDP was 100.00% White. Of the 19 households 15.8% had children under the age of 18 living with them, 57.9% were married couples living together, 5.3% had a female householder with no husband present, and 31.6% were non-families. Of all households 31.6% were one person and 21.1% were one person aged 65 or older. The average household size was 2.05 and the average family size was 2.54.

The age distribution was 17.9% under the age of 18, 10.3% from 25 to 44, 35.9% from 45 to 64, and 35.9% 65 or older. The median age was 58 years. For every 100 females, there were 85.7 males. For every 100 females age 18 and over, there were 113.3 males.

The median household income was $65,179; median incomes for families, males and females are unknown, due to the small size of the population. The per capita income for the CDP was $48,815. None of the population were below the poverty line.
