= Nantucket Sound =

Area of the Atlantic Ocean off Massachusetts, USA

Coordinates: 41°20′0″N 70°14′58″W

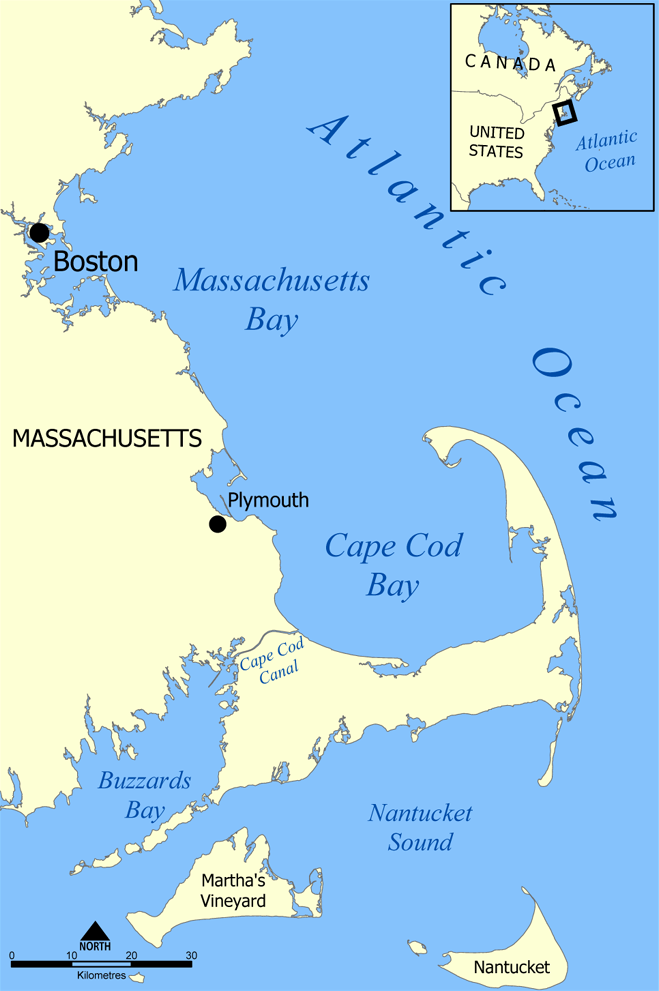
Nantucket Sound lies between Cape Cod, Martha's Vineyard, and Nantucket.

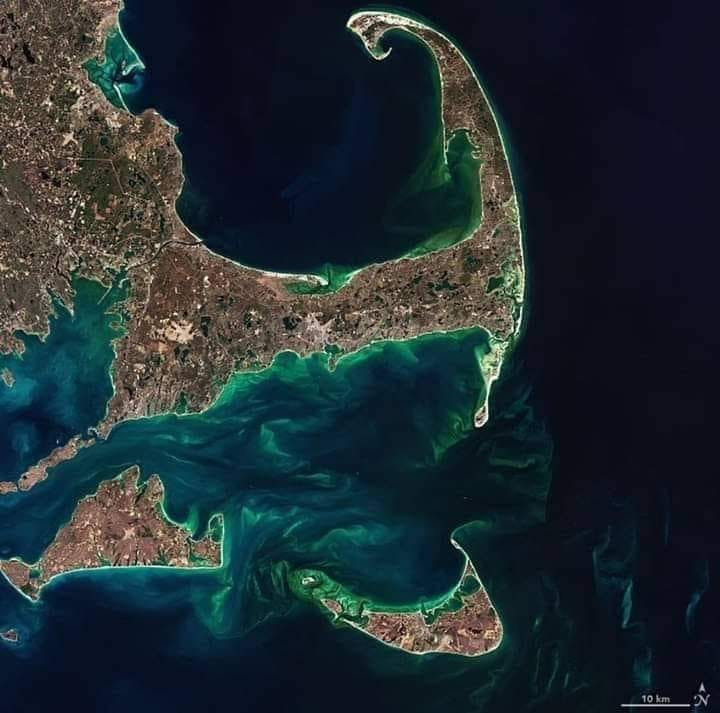
Nantucket Sound, Cape Cod, Martha's Vineyard and Nantucket

Nantucket Sound is a roughly triangular area of the Atlantic Ocean offshore from the U.S. state of Massachusetts. It is 30 miles (48 km) long and 25 miles (40 km) wide, and is enclosed by Cape Cod on the north, Nantucket on the south, and Martha's Vineyard on the west. Between Cape Cod and Martha's Vineyard it is connected to the Vineyard Sound. Ports on Nantucket Sound include Nantucket and Hyannis, Massachusetts.

Nantucket Sound possesses significant marine habitat for a diversity of ecologically and economically important species. "The Sound" has particular significance for several federally protected species of wildlife and a variety of commercially and recreationally valuable fisheries.

The Sound is located at a confluence of the cold Labrador Currents and the warm Gulf Stream. This creates a unique coastal habitat representing the southern range for Northern Atlantic species and the northern range for Mid-Atlantic species. Nantucket Sound has much biological diversity and contains habitats that range from open sea to salt marshes, as well as warm-water beaches on the Cape and Islands coasts. Nantucket Sound is well known for the numerous shoals within its boundaries.

== See also ==
- The Woods Hole, Martha's Vineyard and Nantucket Steamship Authority—providing ferry service in the Sound
- Wind Over Water—A documentary film about the wind farm proposed for Nantucket Sound.
