= Chappaquiddick Tribe of the Wampanoag Indian Nation =

Cultural organization in Martha's Vineyard, Massachusetts

Chappaquiddick Tribe of the Wampanoag Indian Nation Corp
- Named after: Chappaquiddick Island
- Type: 501(c)(3) Public Charity
- Tax ID no.: 04-3283589
- Purpose: Ethnic/Immigrant Services (P84)
- Headquarters: Hyde Park, Massachusetts
- Location: United States
- Members: 300 (2017)
- Official language: English
- President: Diane L. Williams
- Vice President: Kym Ayala
- Revenue: $74,791 (2025)
- Expenses: $128,434 (2025)
- Website: chappaquiddickwampanoag.org

The Chappaquiddick Tribe of the Wampanoag Indian Nation is a nonprofit organization that self-identifies as a Native American tribe but is not recognized as a tribe by the federal government or by any state government. Members identify as descendants of the Wampanoag, a Native American tribe in Massachusetts.

They have about 300 members and are based in Hyde Park, Massachusetts, and South Yarmouth, Massachusetts. Many members of the group trace their ancestry to Love Madison Prince, who was born 1801.

They are named for Chappaquiddick Island, whose name comes from a New England Algonquian language term, translating as "island adjacent to the mainland".

The Chappaquiddick Tribe of the Wampanoag Indian Nation should not be confused with the similarly named Chappaquiddic Indian Band of Massachusetts, based in Pocasset, Massachusetts. They are another unrecognized organization that sent a letter of intent to petition for federal recognition in 2007.

== Status ==
There are two federally recognized tribes in Massachusetts, the Mashpee Wampanoag Tribe and the Wampanoag Tribe of Gay Head, as well as two state-recognized tribes, the Herring Pond Wampanoag Tribe and the Hassanamisco Nipmuc. The Chappaquidick Tribe of the Wampanoag Indian Nation does not have recognition from either the state or the federal government.

=== Petition for federal recognition ===
Aleatha Dickerson of Andover, Massachusetts, filed a letter of intent to petition for federal recognition on May 21, 2007. However, the organization did not follow through with a completed petition for federal recognition.

== Nonprofit ==
The Chappaquiddick Tribe of the Wampanoag Indian Nation incorporated as a 501(c)(3) public charity in 2025, located in Hyde Park, Massachusetts.

Their focus includes the arts, culture, and humanities as well as cultural and ethnic awareness.

For fiscal year 2025, the nonprofit had assets of $63,484, a revenue of $74,791, and expenses of $128,434. The organization received grants from Health Resources in Action in Boston, PayPal Giving Fund, and the New Hampshire Charitable Foundation.

Their officers and board of directors are as follows:

- President: Diane L. Williams
- Vice President: Kym Ayala
- Secretary: Tonia Raymond
- Treasurer: Ahmad Cary
- Director: Tashawna Holman-Kearney
- Director: Bryan Hull
- Director: Destiny Kearney
- Director: Meredith McGoings
- Director: Penny Monk
- Director: Shana Simmons
- Director: Kara Roselle Smith
- Director: Leonard Trey Washington III
- Director: Ariel Wynn
- Director: Barbara Wyche

== See also ==
- Briggs Report (1849)
- Earle Report
- List of organizations that self-identify as Native American tribes
- Native American recognition in the United States
