= Earle Report =

The Earle Report was a report commissioned by the Massachusetts Senate in 1859 and published in 1861. Compiled by John Milton Earle, the report lists Native Americans living in Massachusetts at the time, such as the Wampanoag and the Nipmuc.

== About ==
John Milton Earle was appointed "Commissioner of the Indians" by the Commonwealth of Massachusetts in 1859. Compiled in 1859, the Earle Report was published in 1861.

Eligibility for citizenship in the federally recognized Mashpee Wampanoag Tribe is determined by direct lineal descent from an ancestor listed on the 1861 Earle Report.

A proclamation from the Commonwealth of Massachusetts acknowledging the Herring Pond Wampanoag Tribe as a state recognized tribe in Massachusetts states that ancestors of the Herring Pond Wampanoag are documented on the Earle Report.

== Notable people listed on the Earle Report ==
- Zerviah Gould Mitchell (Fall River)
- Simon Johnson (deacon) (Gay Head)

== See also ==
- Briggs Report (1849)
- Chappaquiddick Tribe of the Wampanoag Indian Nation
- Hassanamisco Nipmuc
- Native American tribal rolls
  - Baker Roll
  - Dawes Rolls
  - United Keetoowah Band Base Roll
- Webster/Dudley Band of Chaubunagungamaug Nipmuck Indians
