= Watson F. Hammond =

Watson F. Hammond (May 24, 1837 – December 9, 1919) was the first Native American to sit in the Great and General Court of Massachusetts.

== Early life ==
Hammond was born in 1837 in the North End of Boston, Massachusetts to John Hammon of Sag Harbor, Long Island and Catherine F. Hammond. a Montauk Indian He had two siblings, Frances C. Hammond (Mingo) and John Hammond. John owned over 50 acres of land on Mashpee Neck on Cape Cod. John died when Watson was seven, and Watson was sent to live with an uncle in Mashpee at the Attaquin Hotel.

== Professional career ==
At the age of 14, Hammond sailed to the north Pacific Ocean on board the Liverpool, a whaling ship out of New Bedford, Massachusetts. The ship, under the command of Captain Weston Swift, hunted bowhead whales for 20 months. While in the bay of Port Clarence, the ship struck a reef and began to sink.

They were rescued by the ship Helen Augusta, a ship sailing from Holmes Hole, Martha's Vineyard. They were towed to a Russian port on St. Lawrence Island, in the Bering Sea, more than 167 miles away. The ship was not salvageable, so the cargo was loaded onto the Helen Augusta. The Liverpool was then set on fire and sank, while Watson sailed home on the Helen Augusta. Following his maiden voyage, he spent the next 15 years working as a seaman.

Watson loved the outdoors and was a successful cranberry farmer on the Mashpee River. He was also an inventor, and patented a cranberry separator in 1883.

== Personal life ==
In 1869 he married Rebecca C. Amos, the daughter of "Blind Joe" Amos, the famous Baptist preacher. Together they had seven children: Jeremiah Hammond, Nellie W. Hammond, Chief Lorenzo (Len) Tandy Hammond, Edith L. Hammond, Charles N. Hammond, Elizabeth Hammond, Charles H Hammond, Alice C Hammond, and Caroline (Carrie) F Pells. The oldest, Charles, became a teacher and Town Clerk in Mashpee. Watson's son Lorenzo, was known as Chief Little Bear of the Wampanoag nation and took over leadership of the tribe from his cousin Nelson D. Simons, a grand-nephew of Watson Hammond. Watson Hammond is buried near the Mashpee Old Indian Meeting House.

== Elected official ==
Watson held every office in Mashpee: town clerk, moderator, selectman, surveyor, and treasurer. He was also the leader of the Mashpee people in addition to being a deacon of his church and a manager of Attaquin Hotel. In 1885 he was elected to serve in the Great and General Court of Massachusetts, representing both Barnstable and Mashpee. Like most of the voters of town of Mashpee, Hammond was a Republican, but there were far more voters in Barnstable. The incumbent, Capt. Zenas E. Crowell of Hyannis was retiring.

Hammond beat "Cranberry King" A. D. Makepeace, the Democratic candidate, by a margin of 77 votes out of 432 cast. His victory party was hosted by the Republican boss, General John Reed at the Samuel Hooper House in Cotuit .
