= Leroy C. Perry =

Leroy C. Perry (also known as Aasamequin or Yellow Feather) (1873–1960) was a Baptist minister from Rhode Island and Massachusetts who served as the first modern sachem of the Pocassett (Wampanoag) serving from 1928 to 1960.

== Early life, family, and career ==
Leroy C. Perry (and his twin Royal) was born in Tiverton, Rhode Island on November 19, 1874 to Commodore Oliver Hazard Perry, an African American Civil War veteran originally from South Carolina, and his wife, Rachel E.M. Crank, a Wampanoag who was a direct ancestor of Massasoit. Perry grew up largely in Fall River's Indian town and then downtown Fall River where he worked at the Weetamoe mill and as a custodian at the Calhoun Avenue School before being called into the ministry. He received tutoring at the school where he worked in Greek, German, French and Latin, and eventually became an elder and preacher at the Narragansett Indian Church in Charlestown, Rhode Island, then the Indian church in Westerly, Rhode Island and other churches in Providence, Rhode Island. In 1928 he first married Sarah Collins in 1896 who died of tuberculosis after the birth of their second child, and then he married in 1901 Hattie Gross who died in 1907 while giving birth to Hazel. Then in 1907 he remarried to Susie F. Gladding Perry in 1908 and remained married until her death in a fire in 1946. He married last to Cynthia Taylor Perry who outlived him. Perry had three children, Nada, Earl, and Hazel.

== Leadership of Wampanoag and ministry on Martha's Vineyard ==
At a powwow in 1928 Perry was elected sachem of the Pocassets and swore in other leaders shortly afterwards including Lorenzo Hammond of the Mashpee. Perry also worked as pastor of the Gay Head Baptist Church from 1933 to 1940 and he was a longtime resident of Gay Head on Martha's Vineyard where he purchased a home in 1939 on Dukes County Avenue from Hezikiah Madison, another Native American. Perry died in 1960 and was buried with his wife in the Oak Grove Cemetery.
