= Lorenzo Hammond =

Lorenzo Tandy Hammond (1871–1959) (also known as Little Bear) was a Mashpee Wampanoag Tribe chief, plumber, and inventor.

Lorenzo Tandy Hammond was born in 1871 in Mashpee to Watson Hammond, a Republican politician, and Rebecca C. Amos, the daughter of a prominent Baptist minister. A short time after an October 1928 meeting at the Herring Pond Baptist Church, the tribe selected Lorenzo Hammond as chief of the Mashpees after his cousin Nelson D. Simons had ended his leadership role in the tribe. Hammond was sworn in by the newly elected Chief Sachem, Rev. Leroy C. Perry, of Pocasset, who ruled the entire Wampanoag Nation. Hammond lived in Cotuit for many years and worked as a very successful plumber for Nickerson Plumbing. He was a "gifted artist" and "invented the Victor Wellpoint (patented by a Cotuit plumber), a cranberry separator, and a bicycle brake." He died in 1959.
