= Simon Johnson (deacon) =

Native American politician (1794–1875)

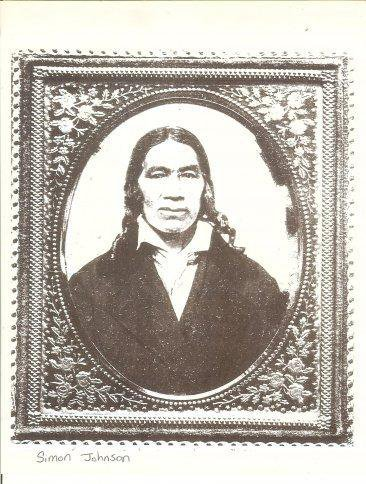
- Born: 1794; Gay Head, now Aquinnah, Massachusetts, U.S.
- Died: 1875 (aged 80–81)
- Occupations: Deacon, Politician, Lifesaving Station Manager
- Known for: community leader, opposition to division of the commons
- Spouse: Hannah Cooper
- Children: Simon Johnson Jr.

Deacon Simon Johnson (1794 – 1875) was a political and religious leader in Gay Head, Massachusetts throughout the mid-nineteenth century. He also managed the Massachusetts Humane Society Gay Head Lifesaving Station, where he recruited volunteer rescue mission volunteers from a pool of either fishermen or whalers.

== Petitions to the Commonwealth of Massachusetts ==
Johnson signed onto many petitions to the Commonwealth of Massachusetts alongside other Proprietors of Gayhead . He is the known author of one such petition concerning premature and unauthorized cranberry harvesting. The petition, signed by Johnson and 77 others Proprietors, asks the commonwealth to enact Penal Laws that would punish anyone who harvests the cranberry bogs without the tribe's permission.

== Social status ==
Due to his high social stature, Deacon Simon was mentioned by multiple writers who visited Aquinnah. In Harper's Magazine, David Hunter Strother, writing under his pen name "Porte Crayon," describes Simon Johnson as holding "authority by a mixed tenure- uniting the character of the Indian chief with that of the New England Deacon." Additionally, the Gazetter of Massachusetts mentioned Johnson and Zaccheus Howwoswee, listing them as "highly esteemed citizens."

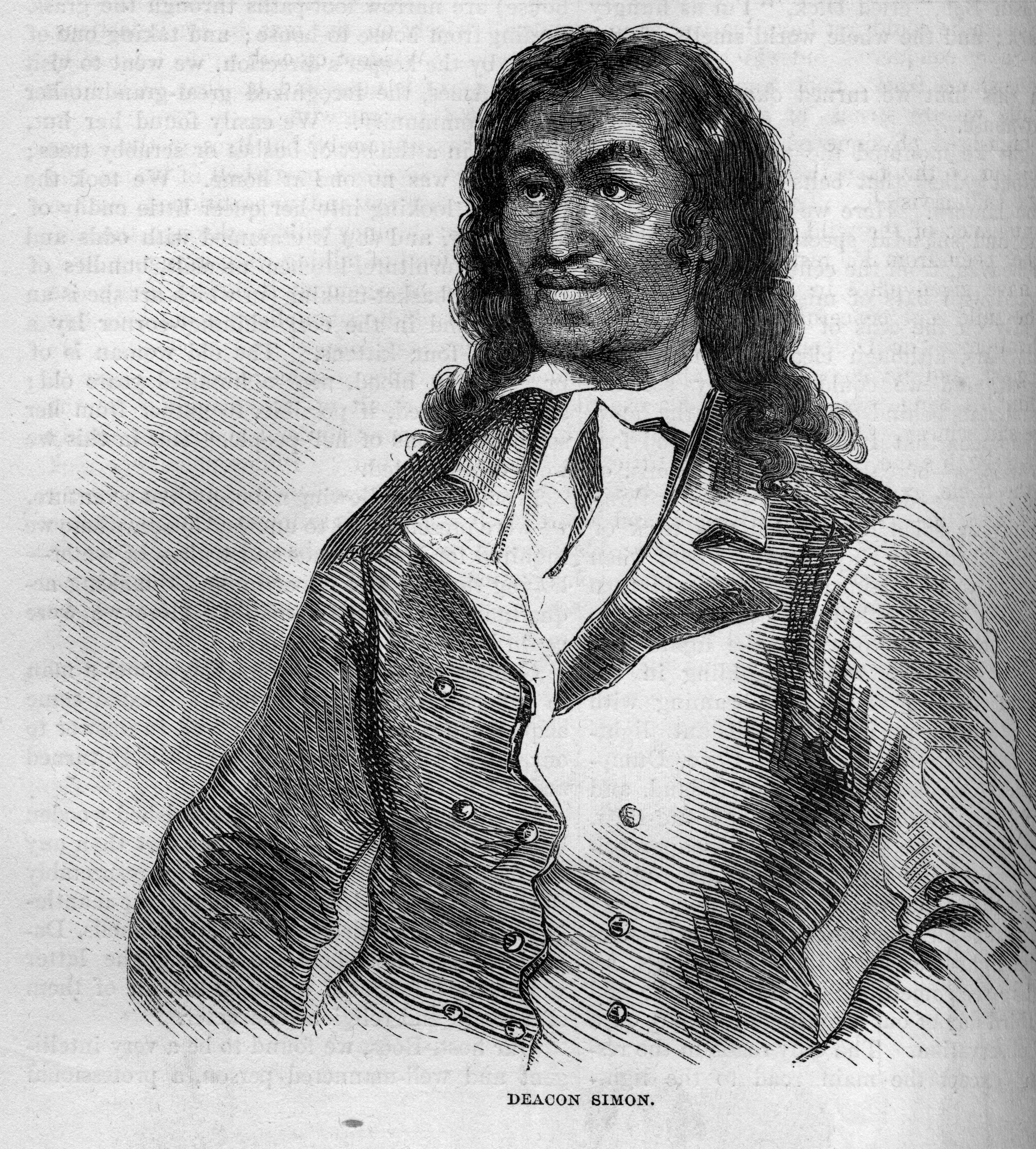
Illustration of "Deacon Simon"

In 1861, he was listed as Gay Head Wampanoag on the Earle Report.

== Lifesaving Station ==
Johnson also was the manager of the Gayhead-based "Massachusetts Humane Society" Lifesaving Station.
