= Zenas E. Crowell =

American sailor (died 1886)

Zenas E. Crowell was a clipper ship captain and sat in the Great and General Court of Massachusetts. He retired in 1885 and died the next year. He was succeeded by Watson F. Hammond.
