= Ebenezer Quippish =

Ebenezer Quippish (also known as Chief Red Jacket or Eben Quieppish or Ebenezer Queppish or Mushquipetohkos) (1859–1933) was a leader of the Mashpee Wampanoag Tribe in Mashpee, Massachusetts. He was known for helping to lead a cultural revival in Mashpee in the 1920s, and was also a traditional basket weaver, chef, hunting/fishing guide, seaman/whaler, and member of Buffalo Bill's Wild West Show.

== Early life and work as a seaman and performer ==
Eben Quippish was born in 1859 in Mashpee to Joseph Quippish and Jemima Pocknett, and as a young man possibly attended the Carlisle Indian Industrial School. In 1877 Ebenezer Queppish sailed on the whaling barque "Josephine." In 1880 Quippish was still working as a seaman. After eventually leaving his job as a seaman, Quippish worked in the Montana Charlie Indian show, then the Healy and Bigelow show, and finally Buffalo Bill Cody's Wild West Show as a horseback rider.

== Later career as a cook, fisherman, craftsman, and cultural leader ==
When the Wild West Show toured Europe, Quippish learned to cook and upon his return to Massachusetts, he cooked at the Tenampo Club in Marstons Mills, Massachusetts, a fishing and hunting resort on Mystic Lake. Queppish also worked as a fisherman and fishing and hunting guide. Throughout his life Quippish supplemented his income by making traditional Wampanoag baskets in the manner learned from his father, and some of Quippish's baskets (and handmade fishing dip nets) are now in museums including the Smithsonian's National Museum of the American Indian. Quippish worked with fellow Mashpee Nelson D. Simons in the 1910s and 1920s to keep alive various Wampanoag cultural traditions and organizations culminating in the 1928 powwow meeting of the various Wampanoag branches. In 1929 as one of the last traditional basketmakers of his generation, Queppish taught Mohegan folklorist, Gladys Tantaguideon how to make an offering basket. Quippish died on January 7, 1933, at Cape Cod Hospital in Barnstable after being hit by a car and was buried in the Mashpee Town Cemetery. His closest surviving relative was his sister, Priscilla Quieppish Pells.
