= Briggs Report (1849) =

The Briggs Report, also known as the Bird Report, was a report commissioned by the Massachusetts Legislature in 1849. Compiled by F.W. Bird, Whiting Griswold, and Cyrus Weekes, the report lists Native Americans living in Massachusetts at the time, such as the Wampanoag and the Nipmuc. The report is named after George N. Briggs, the Governor of Massachusetts at the time.

== About ==
The Herring Pond Wampanoag Tribe, a state-recognized tribe in Massachusetts, uses the Briggs Report and the 1861 Earle Report to trace lineal descent.

== See also ==
- Chappaquiddick Tribe of the Wampanoag Indian Nation
- Native American tribal rolls
  - Baker Roll
  - Dawes Rolls
  - United Keetoowah Band Base Roll
