= Nelson D. Simons =

Mashpee Wampanoag Tribe chief

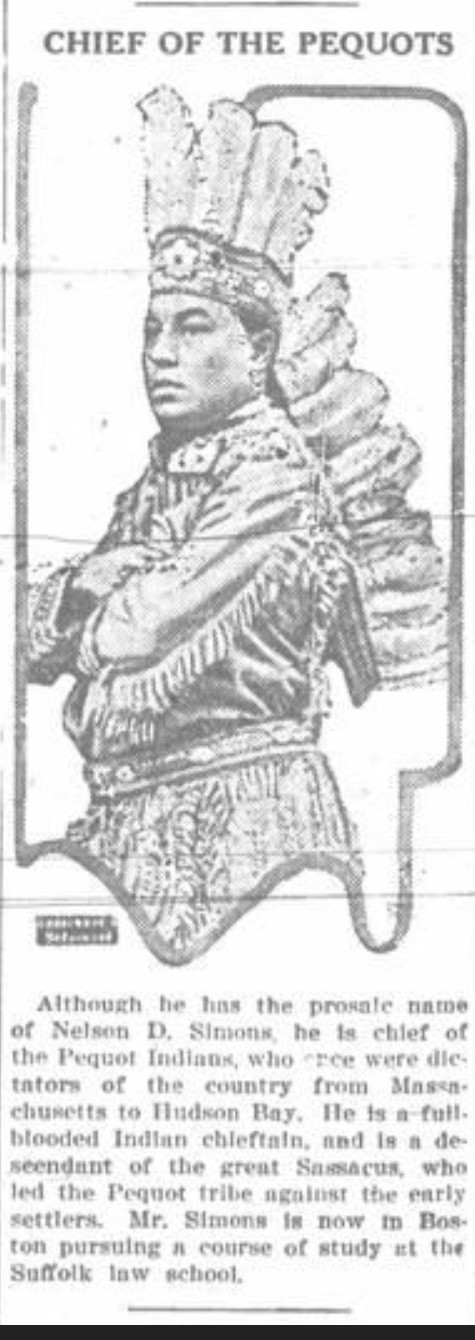
Nelson D. Simons, featured as a "Pequot" chief and descendant of Sassacus, while describing his enrollment at Suffolk Law in Boston in 1921

Nelson Drue Simons (also known as Wabum Annug (Morning Star) and Chief Morning Star and Nelson D. Simon) (1885-1953) was a Mashpee Wampanoag Tribe chief from 1916 to 1928 and government official who was also the first known Native American graduate of Suffolk University Law School in Boston.

== Early life and education at Carisle ==
Nelson Drue Simons was born on November 23, 1885 to Isaac Simon, a seaman, whaler, and farmer and Ella Frances Mingo Simon of Mashpee, Massachusetts, and Nelson had at least five siblings (including Edward, Lily, Zepheniah, Ellen, and Eva). In addition to his Wampanoag heritage, Simons was also of at least partial Pequot ancestry and was purportedly a descendant of Sassacus. From 1896 to 1904 he attended the Mashpee Public Schools. After his father's death in 1905 Nelson Simons and his siblings attended Carlisle Indian Industrial School in Pennsylvania. Simons attended Carlisle from 1909 to 1914 and was president of Carlisle YMCA, a Lieutenant of the school's Company B, and attended the Second Presbyterian Church. and published articles in the Carlisle Arrow. Simons provided written testimony to Congress supporting the YMCA at Carlisle. At Carlisle Simons trained in plumbing and pipe fitting.

== Leadership at Mashpee, Suffolk Law School and career ==
After graduation, Simons returned to Mashpee, Massachusetts and succeeded his maternal great-uncle Watson F. Hammond as town clerk in 1915 and as tribal chief the upon his uncle's death the following year. From 1914 to at least 1917 he reported his occupation as "cranberrying," but by 1920 Simons was working as a plumber. He also had a small farm with a cow and requested a Carlisle student to work for him during the summer of 1915. Simons was leader of the Mashpee tribe from approximately 1916 through the 1920s and helped lead a cultural revival there working closely with Eben Quippish, another tribal leader, and Simons re-dedicated the Old Indian Meeting House in 1922. Simons also served as Mashpee's tax collector, and he was appointed postmaster after petitioning for U.S. Mail service in Mashpee. He matriculated at Suffolk University Law School in Boston in 1921 and graduated in 1925. At Suffolk he published an article in the 1921 Suffolk Register entitled, "Possibilities of Spare Moments." Simons was also a poet and published at least one poem in 1922 about Mashpee. Simon's sister Lillian, also was a published poet. As a tribal leader in 1928, Simons helped unite the Mashpee, Herring Pond, and Gay Head communities with their first joint powwow. Simons purportedly left Mashpee around 1929, and his cousin, Lorenzo Tandy Hammond, became the tribal leader, and for the rest of his life Simons lived around Cambridge, Massachusetts working various jobs, including as a chaffeur, carpenter and janitor until his death in 1953. He was never married according to the 1950 U.S. Census.
