= Joan Tavares Avant =

Mashpee Wampanoag tribal leader, historian and writer

- Granny Squannit

Mashpee Wampanoag Tribal President, Tribal Historian, and writer leader

Personal details
- Born: April 14, 1940 (age 86) Honolulu, Hawaii, United States
- Relations: Mabel Pocknett Avant (Grandmother)
- Education: University of Massachusetts Boston, B.A in human services 1993; Cambridge College, master's degree in education, 1995
- Known for: Author of People of the First Light; Director of Indian Education in the Mashpee Public Schools, columnist for the Mashpee Enterprise

Joan Tavares Avant (born April 14, 1940), also known as Granny Squannit, is an educator, Mashpee Wampanoag tribal leader, historian, and writer living in Mashpee, Massachusetts. Avant served as the Mashpee Public School Director of Indian Education and was a founding Trustee of the Wôpanâak language immersion program. As a tribal leader, Avant has served as Tribal President, Tribal Housing Commissioner, Clan Mother, and Professional Tribal Elder. Her writer's credits include a long-running column in the Mashpee Enterprise, editing the National League of American Pen Women's newsletter, and People of the First Light (2010).

== Biography ==
Joan Tavares Avant is the granddaughter of respected Mashpee leader Mabel Pocknett Avant (Nokomis). Avant has served three terms as Tribal President, four terms as Tribal Historian, and was the Director of Indian Education in the Mashpee Public School System for 26 years where she developed a Wampanoag curriculum along with teaching and promoting history and cultural awareness to Native parents, students and non-Natives. She has worked with Wampanoag families for over 30 years regarding social issues and has served in the court as a Professional Tribal Elder for family in crises (IQUA). In that latter capacity, she worked to provide guidance and promote cultural awareness to local Wampanoag students and teachers, as well as to provide school day care and tutoring services. She worked with Native and non-Native educators to create a curriculum that highlighted local Wampanoag elders, culture, history, legends, and values.

In 1993, the Falmouth Affirmative Action Committee recognized Avant for her work with education. In November 2012 she was featured in the CBS News segment Wampanoag: Reviving the language discussing the Wampanoag Language Reclamation Project. Avant remains actively involved in the Mashpee community as a Clan Mother, Commissioner for the Tribal Housing Commission, and member of the Mashpee Historical Commission. She also serves on the Mittark Committee, which publishes Nashauonk Mittark, the monthly Mashpee Wampanoag newsletter.

Avant is mother to four children, grandmother to five grandchildren, great-grandmother to 3 great-grandchildren, and has two unadopted adult children, all which she loves dearly. She is also one of seven clan mothers, the Deer clan mother of her tribe.

== Education ==
Avant received a Bachelor of Arts in human services in 1993 at the age of 53 from the University of Massachusetts Boston, and a master's degree in education at Cambridge College in 1995. She is currently working on a doctoral degree in Education at the University of Massachusetts Amherst.

== Publications ==
Avant has had a long career as a columnist for the Mashpee Enterprise, in which she currently writes a column titled "Tales From Granny Squannit," and has also written for the Cape Cod Times. Two of her articles, Now, and Always, Wampanaog and With Intent to Civilize, have been featured in the Cultural Survival quarterly magazine. She is also an editor of the National League of American Pen Women’s newsletter.

She has also self-published two books: Wampanoag cooking: A prelude to the soon-to-be-published book Wampanoag foods & legends (1993) and People of the First Light (2010). The latter is a compilation of personal memoirs, Wampanoag history, and recipes, focusing on Avant's own experiences in the Mashpee Community.

== The Tale of Granny Squannit ==
Granny Squannit is one of the oldest Wampanoag legends. An old medicine woman with long black hair covering the single eye in her forehead, she snatches away children who misbehave, taking them away in her canoe to her cave in Cummaquid to scare them into being good. However, Granny Squannit also has a benevolent side, giving presents to good children and guiding sailors who leave her gifts. Every Halloween, Avant dresses up as Granny and greets (often scaring them in the process) Mashpee children as they walk through the woods.

After playing Granny Squannit for adults, children and organizations and keeping her alive through writings for 20 years, Avant was given "Granny Squannit" as her native name from their tribal medicine man. She continues to write articles on Granny Squannit, even having her own column titled "Tales from Granny Squannit" in the Mashpee Enterprise in recent years. She also has a black and white tattoo of Granny Squannit on her right arm.

== Today ==
Joan writes, "I am honored to serve as a founding trustee for the WLRP project to open a K-3 immersion charter school in the fall of 2015. It has been my forever passion to not only preserve the culture but to assist making wise pedagogic decisions for our children and families in their own public recognized tribal school".
