= Wampanoag =

Native American tribes in Massachusetts

Wôpanâak
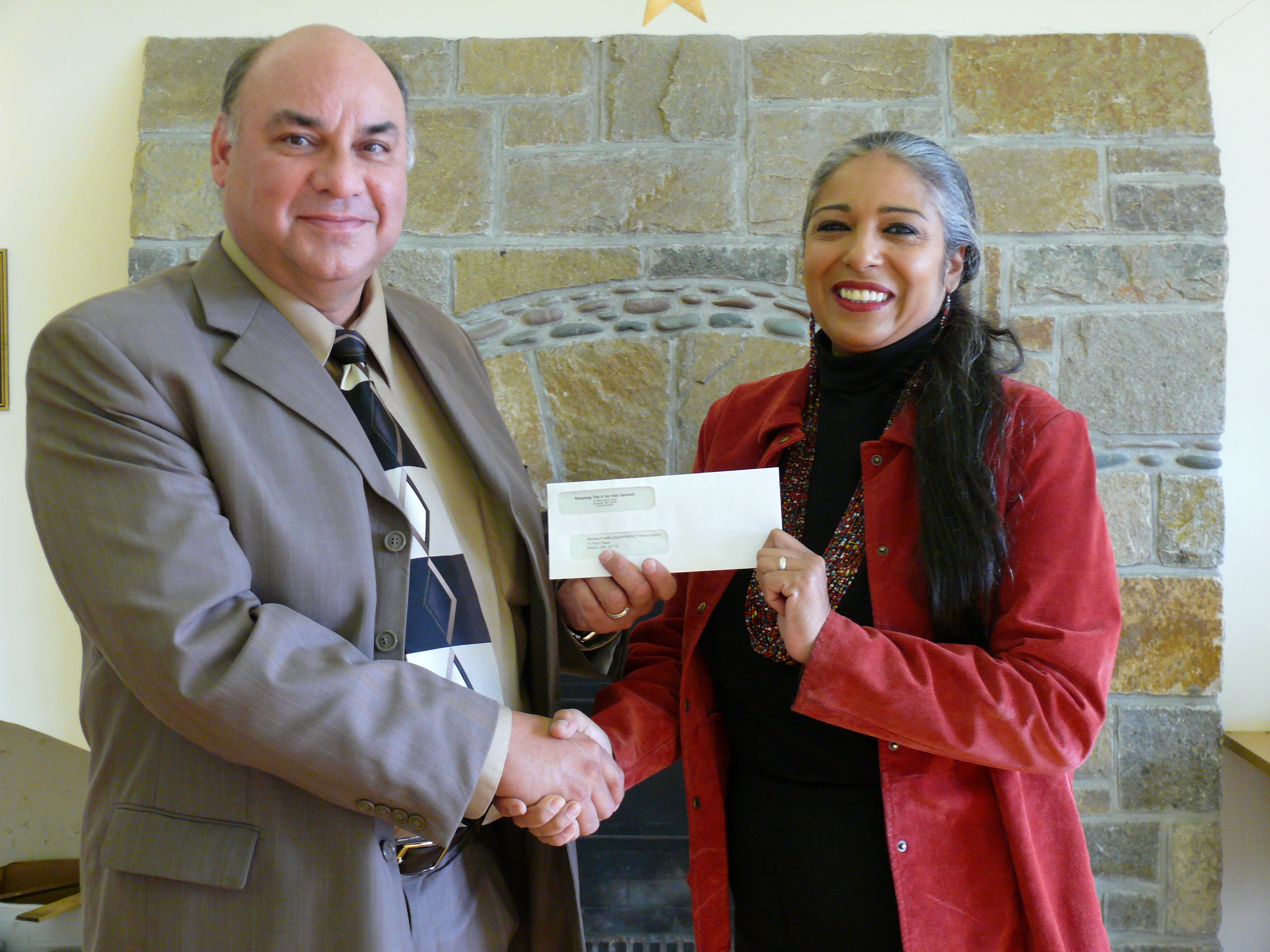
- Cheryl Andrews-Maltais (right), Chairperson of the Wampanoag Tribe of Aquinnah with a MassDOT engineer

Total population
- 2,756 (2010 census), 3,841 (2023)

Regions with significant populations
- Massachusetts, formerly Rhode Island

Languages
- English, historically Wôpanâak

Religion
- Indigenous religion, Christianity

Related ethnic groups
- Massachusett, Agawam, Nauset Naumkeag, and other Algonquian peoples

The Wampanoag, also rendered Wôpanâak, are a Native American people of the Northeastern Woodlands currently based in southeastern Massachusetts and formerly parts of eastern Rhode Island. Their historical territory includes the islands currently known as Martha's Vineyard and Nantucket.

Two Wampanoag tribes are federally recognized:

- Mashpee Wampanoag Tribe
- Wampanoag Tribe of Gay Head (Aquinnah).

The Wampanoag language, also known as Massachusett, is a Southern New England Algonquian language.

Before English contact in the 17th century, the Wampanoag numbered as many as 40,000 people living in 67 villages. These villages covered the territory along the east coast as far as Wessagusset (present-day Weymouth), all of Cape Cod and the islands of Natocket (Nantucket) and Noepe (Martha's Vineyard), and southeast as far as Pokanoket (now Bristol and Warren, Rhode Island). The Wampanoag lived on this land for more than 12,000 years.

From 1615 to 1619, a leptospirosis epidemic reduced the population of the Wampanoag and neighboring tribes. The drastic depopulation facilitated the English colonization of the Massachusetts Bay Colony. More than 50 years later, Wampanoag Chief Sachem Metacom and his allies waged King Philip's War (1675–1676) against the colonists. The war resulted in the death of 40 percent of the surviving Wampanoag. New England colonists sold many Wampanoag men into slavery in Bermuda, the West Indies, or on plantations and farms in North America.

Wampanoag people continue to live in historical homelands and maintain central aspects of their culture. Oral history, ceremonies, song, dance, social gatherings, hunting, and fishing remain important traditional ways of life to the Wampanoag. In 2015, the federal government declared 150 acres of land in Mashpee and 170 acres of land in Taunton as the Mashpee Wampanoag Tribe’s initial Indian reservation. The Mashpee tribe has approximately 3,200 enrolled citizens. The Aquinnah tribe has 901 enrolled citizens. Early 21st-century population estimates indicated a total of 4,500 Wampanoag descendants. Wampanoag activists have been reviving the Wampanoag language; Mashpee High School began a course teaching the language in 2018.

== Name ==
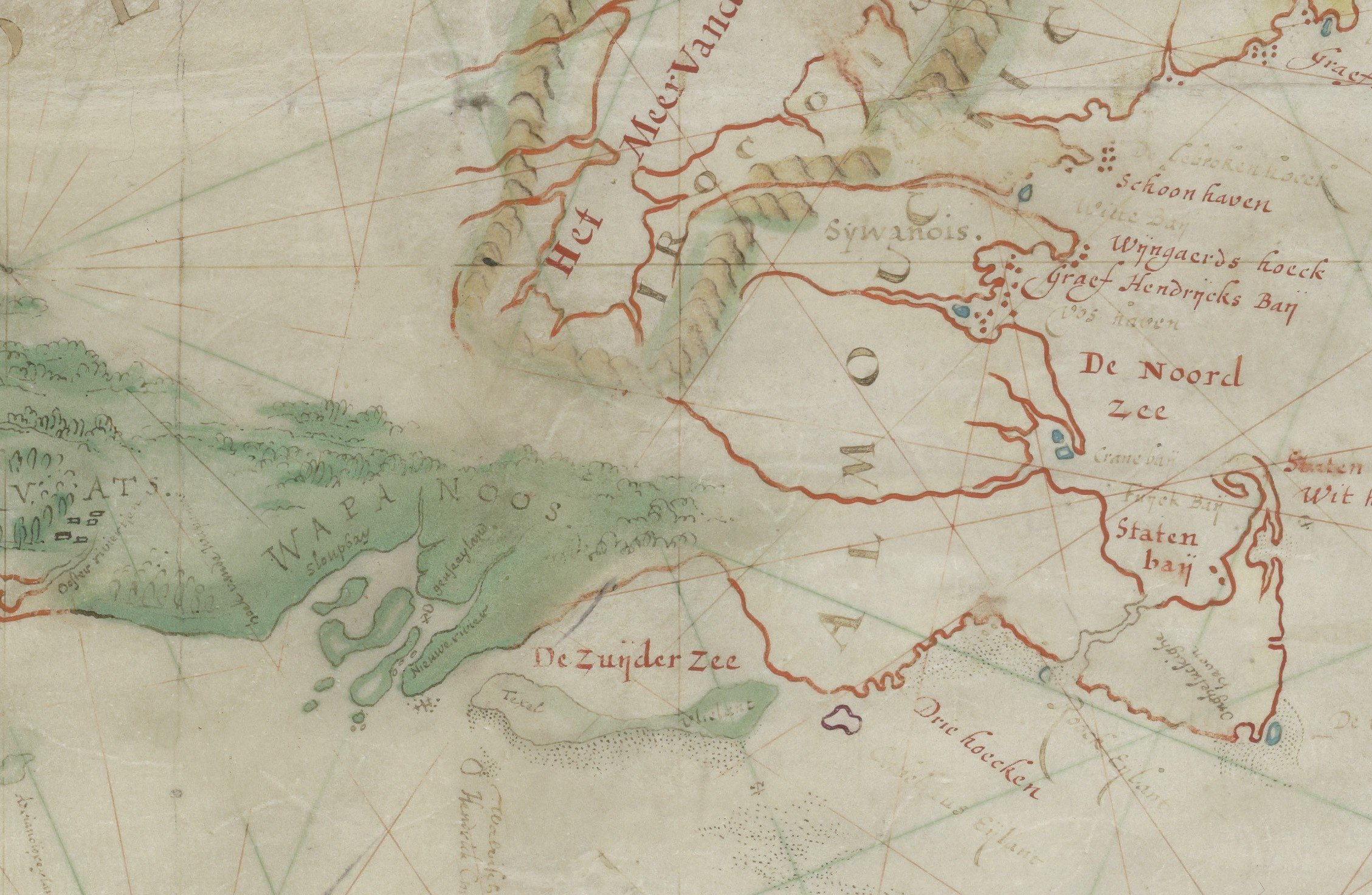
"Wapanoos" in Adriaen Block's map of North America based on his 1614 voyage on the Tyger and the Onrust.

Wampanoag came from a Proto-Eastern Algonquin word *wapan translating as "dawn" or "east," and Wôpanâak became the Narragansett language term, translating as "an eastern person or people of the dawn," which was anglicized to Wampanoag by the 18th century.

Wapanoos was first documented on Adriaen Block's 1614 map, which was the earliest European representation of the Wampanoag territory. Increase Mather first recorded Wampanoag in 1676 to describe the alliance of tribes who fought against the English in King Philip's War.

In 1616, John Smith referred to one of the Wampanoag tribes as the Pokanoket. The earliest colonial records and reports used Pokanoket as the name of the tribe whose leaders (the Massasoit Ousemequin until 1661, his son Wamsutta from 1661 to 1662, and Metacomet from 1662 to 1676) led the Wampanoag confederation at the time the English began settling southeastern New England.

== Wampanoag groups and locations ==
Map of Wampanoag territory c. 1620

| Group | Area inhabited |
|---|---|
| Assawompsett Nemasket | Lakeville, Middleborough and Taunton, Massachusetts |
| Assonet | Assonet Neck, Assonet-Freetown, Greater New Bedford |
| Gay Head or Aquinnah | Western point of Martha's Vineyard |
| Chappaquiddick | Chappaquiddick Island |
| Nantucket | Nantucket Island |
| Nauset | Cape Cod |
| Mashpee | Cape Cod |
| Patuxet | Eastern Massachusetts, on Plymouth Bay |
| Pokanoket | East Bay of Rhode Island including Warren, Rhode Island, and parts of Seekonk, Massachusetts |
| Pocasset | Fall River, Massachusetts, Tiverton, Rhode Island |
| Herring Pond | Plymouth & Cape Cod |

== Culture ==
The Wampanoag people were semi-sedentary with seasonal movements between sites in southern New England. The men often traveled far north and south along the Eastern seaboard for seasonal fishing expeditions, and sometimes stayed in those distant locations for weeks and months at a time. The women cultivated varieties of the "three sisters" (maize, climbing beans, and squash) as the staples of their diet, supplemented by wild fruits and nuts, as well as fish and game caught by the men. Each community had authority over a well-defined territory from which the people derived their livelihood through a seasonal round of fishing, planting, harvesting, and hunting. Southern New England was populated by various tribes, so hunting grounds had strictly defined boundaries.

The Wampanoag were matrilineal, like other Indigenous peoples of the Northeastern Woodlands, with hereditary status passed through the maternal line. They were also matrifocal; when a young couple married, they lived with the woman's family. Women owned property, and female elders could approve selection of chiefs or sachems. Men acted in most of the political roles for relations with other bands and tribes, as well as for warfare. Women passed plots of land to their female descendants, regardless of their marital status.

Food production among the Wampanoag, like many Native societies, was divided along gender lines. Men and women had specific tasks. Women played an active role in many of the stages of food production and processing, so they had important sociopolitical, economic, and spiritual roles in their communities. Wampanoag men were mainly responsible for hunting and fishing, while women took care of farming and gathering wild fruits, nuts, berries, and shellfish. Women were responsible for up to 75 percent of all food production in Wampanoag societies.

The Wampanoag were organized into a confederation in which a head sachem presided over a number of other sachems. The colonists often referred to him as "king", but the position of a sachem differed in many ways from a king. They were selected by women elders and were bound to consult their own councilors within their tribe, as well as any of the "petty sachems" in the region. They were also responsible for arranging trade privileges, as well as protecting their allies in exchange for material tribute. Both women and men could hold the position of sachem, and women were sometimes chosen over close male relatives.

Pre-marital sexual experimentation was accepted, although the Wampanoag expected fidelity within unions after marriage. Roger Williams (1603–1683) said that "single fornication they count no sin, but after Marriage... they count it heinous for either of them to be false." Polygamy was practiced among the Wampanoag, although monogamy was the norm. Some elite men could take several wives for political or social reasons, and multiple wives were a symbol of wealth. Women were the producers and distributors of corn and other food products. Marriage and conjugal unions were not as important as ties of clan and kinship.

== Language and revival ==
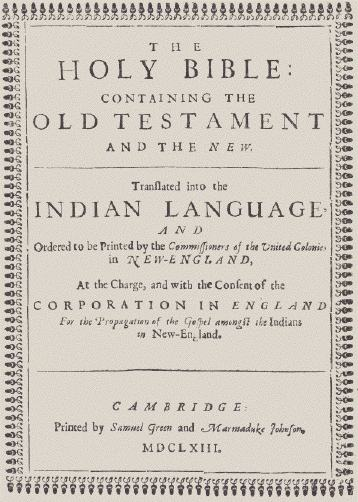
Title page of the Eliot Indian Bible (completed in 1663), a bible translated into the Massachusett language and the first Bible printed in British North America.

The Wampanoag originally spoke Wôpanâak, a dialect of the Massachusett language, which belongs to the Algonquian languages family. The first Bible published in America was a 1663 translation into Algonquin by missionary John Eliot. He created an orthography, which he taught to the Wampanoag. Many became literate, using Wampanoag for letters, deeds, and historic documents.

The rapid decline of Wampanoag speakers began after the American Revolution. Neal Salisbury and Colin G. Calloway suggest that New England Indian communities suffered from gender imbalances at this time due to premature male deaths, especially due to warfare and their work in the hazardous trades of whaling and shipping. They posit that many Wampanoag women married outside their linguistic groups, making it difficult for them to maintain the various Wampanoag dialects.

Jessie Little Doe Baird (Mashpee Wampanoag) founded the Wôpanâak Language Reclamation Project in 1993. The program has taught some children, who have become the first speakers of Wôpanâak in more than a century. The project is training teachers to reach more children and to develop a curriculum for a Wôpanâak-based school. Baird has developed a 10,000-word Wôpanâak-English dictionary by consulting archival Wôpanâak documents and using linguistic methods to reconstruct unattested words. For this project she was awarded a MacArthur Fellowship in 2010. She has also produced a grammar, collections of stories, and other books. Mashpee High School began a course in 2018 teaching the language.

== History ==
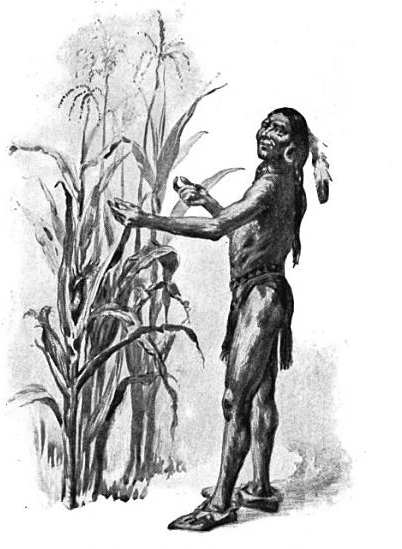
Tisquantum helped the Plymouth colonists learn to cultivate corn.

Contacts between the Wampanoag and colonists began in the 16th century when European merchant vessels and fishing boats traveled along the coast of New England. In 1524, Giovanni de Verrazano contacted various tribes such as the Wampanoag and the Narragansett in modern day Rhode Island. Captain Thomas Hunt captured several Wampanoag in 1614 and sold them in Spain as slaves. A Patuxet named Tisquantum (or Squanto) was ransomed by Spanish monks who focused on education and evangelization before he escaped. He accompanied an expedition to Newfoundland as an interpreter, then made his way back to his homeland in 1619, only to discover that the entire Patuxet tribe had died in an epidemic.

The Wampanoag suffered from an epidemic between 1616 and 1619, long thought to be smallpox introduced by contact with Europeans. However, a 2010 study suggests that the epidemic was leptospirosis, introduced by rat reservoirs on European ships. The groups most devastated by the illness were those who had traded heavily with the French and the disease was likely a virgin soil epidemic. Alfred Crosby has estimated population losses to be as high as 90 percent among the Massachusett and mainland Pokanoket.

In 1620, the Pilgrims arrived in Plymouth, and Tisquantum and other Wampanoag taught them how to cultivate the varieties of corn, squash, and beans (the Three Sisters) that flourished in New England, as well as how to catch and process fish and collect seafood. They enabled the Pilgrims to survive their first winters, and Squanto lived with them and acted as a middleman between them and Massasoit, the Wampanoag sachem. In Mourt's Relation, initial contact between the Pilgrims and the Wampanoag was recorded as beginning in the spring of 1621.

The Wampanoag are commonly depicted in pop culture as attending the First Thanksgiving. However many American Indians and historians argue against the romanticized story of the Wampanoag celebrating together with the colonists. One primary account of the 1621 event was written by a firsthand observer states that there were Indians at the celebration but nothing more.

Massasoit became gravely ill in the winter of 1623, but he was nursed back to health by the colonists. In 1632, the Narragansetts attacked Massasoit's village in Sowam, but the colonists helped the Wampanoag to drive them back.

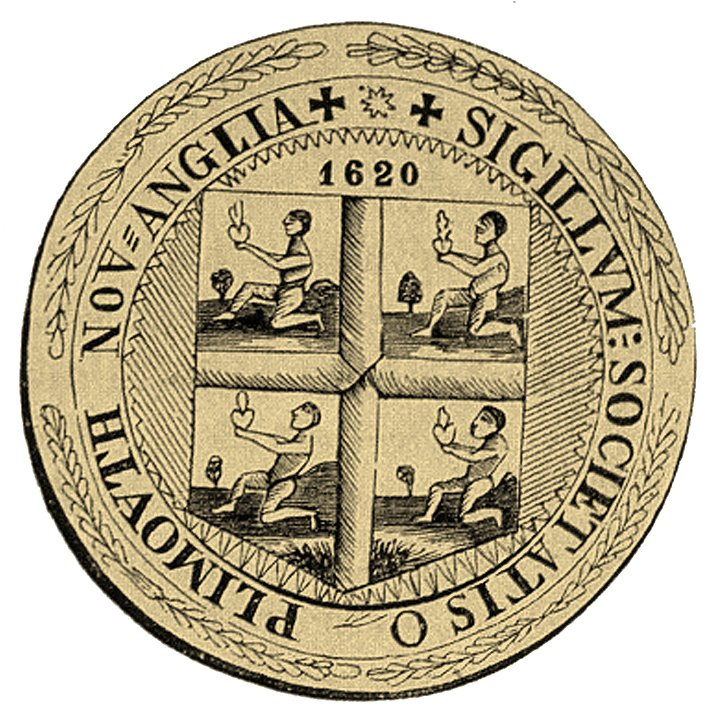
Seal of Plymouth Colony

After 1632, the Plymouth Colony was outnumbered by the growing Puritan settlements around Boston. The colonists expanded westward into the Connecticut River Valley. In 1638, they destroyed the powerful Pequot Confederation. In 1643, the Mohegans defeated the Narragansetts in a war with support from the colonists, and they became the dominant tribe in southern New England.

=== Conversion to Christianity ===
After 1650, John Eliot and other Puritan missionaries sought to convert local tribes to Christianity, and those that converted settled in 14 Praying towns. Eliot and his colleagues hoped that the Indians would adopt practices such as monogamous marriage, agriculture, and jurisprudence. The high levels of epidemics among the Indians may have motivated some conversions. Salisbury suggests that the survivors suffered a type of spiritual crisis because their medical and religious leaders had been unable to prevent the epidemic losses.

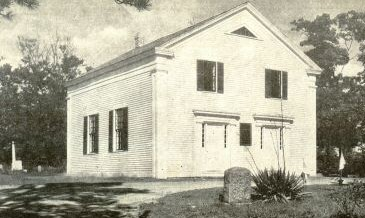
"Old Indian Meeting House" built in 1684 in Mashpee, Massachusetts, the oldest Indian church building in the United States

Individual towns and regions had differing expectations for Indian conversions. In most of Eliot's mainland praying towns, religious converts were also expected to follow colonial laws and manners and to adopt the material trappings of colonial life. Eliot and other ministers relied on praise and rewards for those who conformed, rather than punishing those who did not. The Christian Indian settlements of Martha's Vineyard were noted for a great deal of sharing and mixing between Wampanoag and colonial ways of life. Wampanoag converts often continued their traditional practices in dress, hairstyle, and governance. The Martha's Vineyard converts were not required to attend church and they often maintained traditional cultural practices, such as mourning rituals.

The Wampanoag women were more likely to convert to Christianity than the men. Experience Mayhew said that "it seems to be a Truth with respect to our Indians, so far as my knowledge of them extend, that there have been, and are a greater number of their Women appearing pious than of the men among them" in his text "Indian Converts". The frequency of female conversion created a problem for missionaries, who wanted to establish patriarchal family and societal structures among them. Women had control of property, and inheritance and descent passed through their line, including hereditary leadership for men. Wampanoag women on Martha's Vineyard were the spiritual leaders of their households. In general, English ministers agreed that it was preferable for women to subvert the patriarchal model and assume a dominant spiritual role than it was for their husbands to remain unconverted. Experience Mayhew asked, "How can those Wives answer it unto God who do not Use their utmost Endeavors to Perswade and oblige their husbands to maintain Prayer in their families?" In some cases, Wampanoag women converts accepted changed gender roles under colonial custom, while others practiced their traditional roles of shared power as Christians.

=== Metacomet (King Philip) ===
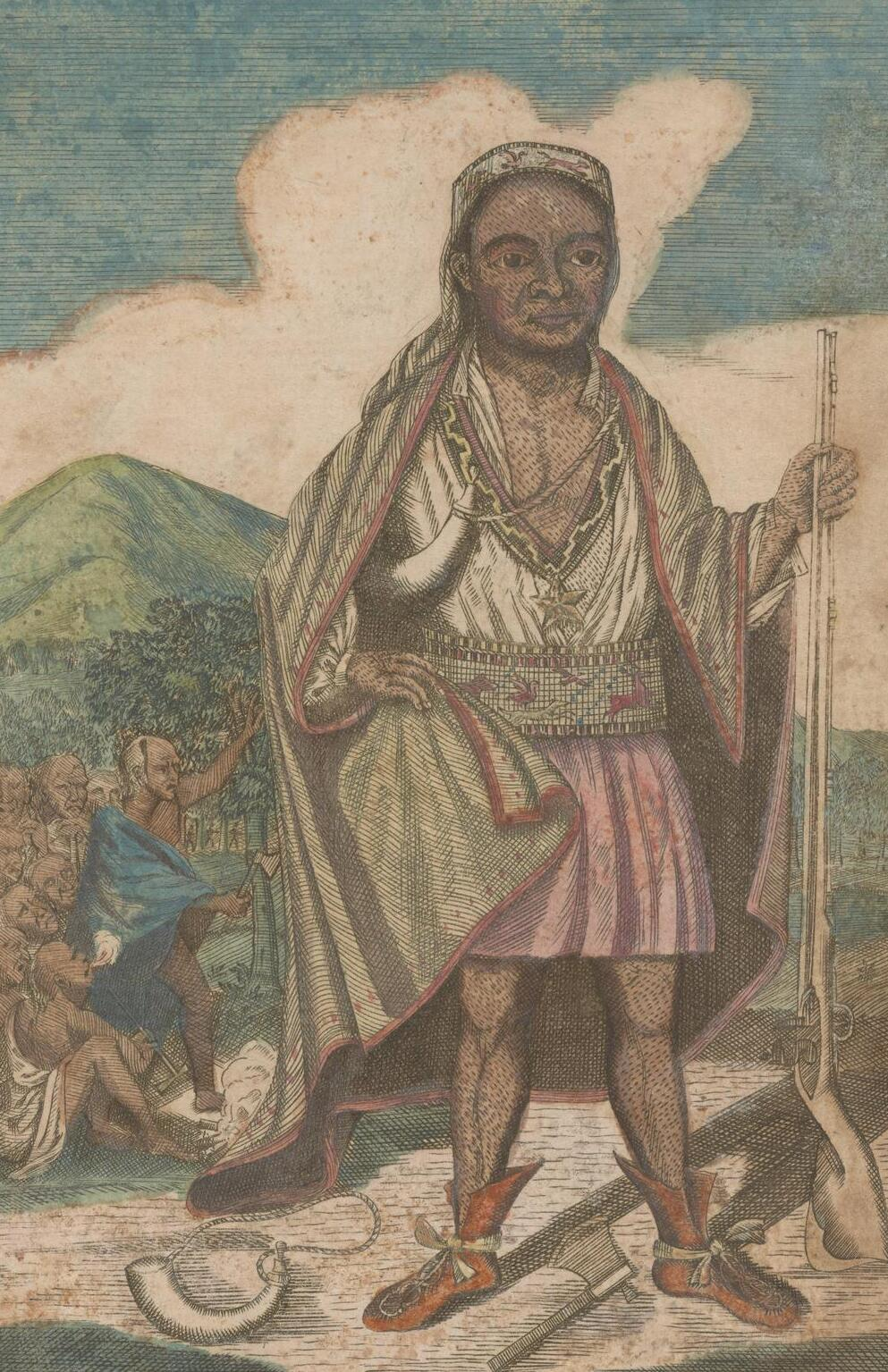
Philip, King of Mount Hope, 1772, by Paul Revere

Massasoit was among those Indians who adopted colonial customs. He asked the legislators in Plymouth near the end of his life to give both of his sons English names. The older son Wamsutta was given the name Alexander, and his younger brother Metacom was named Philip. After his father's death, Alexander became the sachem of the Wampanoag. The colonists invited him to Plymouth to talk, but Wamsutta became seriously ill on the way home and died shortly after. The Wampanoag were told that he died of fever, but many Indians thought that he had been poisoned. The following year, his brother Philip (Metacom) became sachem of the Wampanoag.

Under Philip's leadership, the relationship changed dramatically between the Wampanoag and the colonists. Philip believed that the ever-increasing colonists would eventually take over everything — not only land, but also their culture, their way of life, and their religion — so he decided to limit the further expansion of colonial settlements. The Wampanoag numbered only 1,000, and Philip began to visit other tribes to build alliances among those who also wanted to push out the colonists. At that time, the population colonists in southern New England was already more than double that of the Indians, at 35,000 to 15,000. In 1671, Philip was called to Taunton, Massachusetts, where he listened to the accusations of the colonists, and signed an agreement that required the Wampanoag to give up their firearms. To be on the safe side, he did not take part in the subsequent dinner. His men never delivered their weapons.

Philip gradually gained the Nipmuck, Pocomtuc, and Narragansett as allies, and the beginning of the uprising was first planned for the spring of 1676. In March 1675, however, John Sassamon was murdered. Sassamon was a Christian Indian raised in Natick, one of the praying towns. He was educated at Harvard College and had served as a scribe, interpreter, and counselor to Philip and the Wampanoag. But, a week before his death, Sassamon reported to Plymouth governor Josiah Winslow that Philip was planning a war against the colonists.

Sassamon was found dead under the ice of Assawompsett Pond a week later. A Christian Indian accused three Wampanoag warriors of his murder. The colonists took the three captive and hanged them in June 1675 after a trial by a jury of 12 colonists and six Christian Indians. This execution, combined with rumors that the colonists wanted to capture Philip, was a catalyst for war. Philip called a council of war on Mount Hope. Most Wampanoag wanted to follow him, except the Nauset on Cape Cod and the small groups on the offshore islands. Allies included the Nipmuc, Pocomtuc, some Pennacook, and eastern Abenaki from farther north. The Narragansett remained neutral at the beginning of the war.

=== King Philip's War ===
On June 20, 1675, some Wampanoag attacked colonists in Swansea, Massachusetts, and laid siege to the town. Five days later, they destroyed it completely, leading to King Philip's War. The united tribes in southern New England attacked 52 of 90 colonial settlements and partially burned them down.

At the outbreak of the war, many Indians offered to fight with the colonists against King Philip and his allies, serving as warriors, scouts, advisers, and spies. Mistrust and hostility eventually caused the colonists to discontinue Indian assistance, even though they were invaluable in the war. The Massachusetts government moved many Christian Indians to Deer Island in Boston Harbor, in part to protect the " praying Indians" from vigilantes, but also as a precautionary measure to prevent rebellion and sedition from them. Mary Rowlandson's The Sovereignty and Goodness of God is an account of her months of captivity by the Wampanoag during King Philip's War in which she expressed shock at the cruelties from Christian Indians.

From Massachusetts, the war spread to other parts of New England. The Kennebec, Pigwacket (Pequawkets), and Arosaguntacook from Maine joined in the war against the colonists. The Narragansetts of Rhode Island gave up their neutrality after the colonists attacked one of their fortified villages. The Narragansetts lost more than 600 people and 20 sachems in the battle which became known as the "Great Swamp Massacre". Their leader Canonchet was able to flee and led a large group of Narragansett warriors west to join King Philip's warriors.

The war turned against Philip in the spring of 1676, following a winter of hunger and deprivation. The colonial troops set out after Canonchet and took him captive. After a firing squad executed him, colonists quartered his corpse and sent his head to Hartford, Connecticut, where it was set on public display.

During the summer months, Philip escaped from his pursuers and went to a hideout on Mount Hope in Rhode Island. Colonial forces attacked in August, killing and capturing 173 Wampanoags. Philip barely escaped capture, but his wife and their nine-year-old son were captured and put on a ship at Plymouth. They were then sold as slaves in Bermuda (originally part of the Colony of Virginia). On August 12, 1676, colonial troops surrounded Philip's camp, and soon shot and killed him.

=== Consequences of the war ===
With the death of Metacomet and most of their leaders, the Wampanoags were nearly exterminated; over 40% were killed (Pokanoket Tribe Pokanoket Nation). The Narragansetts and Nipmucks suffered similar rates of losses, and many small tribes in southern New England were finished. In addition, many Wampanoag were sold into slavery. Male captives were generally sold to slave traders and transported to the West Indies, Bermuda, Virginia, or the Iberian Peninsula. The colonists used the women and children as slaves or indentured servants in New England, depending on the colony. Massachusetts resettled the remaining Wampanoags in Natick, Wamesit, Punkapoag, and Hassanamesit, four of the original 14 praying towns. These were the only ones to be resettled after the war. Overall, approximately 5,000 Indians (40 percent of their population) and 2,500 colonists (5 percent) were killed in King Philip's War.

=== 18th to 20th century ===
==== Mashpee ====
The exception to relocation was the coastal islands' Wampanoag groups, who had stayed neutral through the war. The colonists forced the Wampanoag of the mainland to resettle with the Saconnet (Sekonnet), or with the Nauset into the praying towns in Barnstable County. Mashpee is the largest Indian reservation set aside in Massachusetts, and is located on Cape Cod. In 1660, the colonists allotted the natives about 50 square miles (130 km^{2}) there, and beginning in 1665 they had self-government, adopting an English-style court of law and trials. Mashpee sachems Wepquish and Tookenchosin declared in 1665 that this land would not be able to be sold to non-Mashpee without the unanimous consent of the tribe, writing "We freely give these lands forementioned unto the South Sea Indians and their children forever: and not to be sold or given away from them by anyone without all their consents thereunto." An Indian Deed relating to the Petition of Reuben Cognehew presented a provision established by a representative of the community named Quatchatisset establishing that the allotment would " for ever not to be sold or given or alienated from them [his descendants] or any part of these lands." Property deeds in 1671 recorded this area known as the Mashpee Plantation as consisting of around 55 square miles of land. The area was integrated into the district of Mashpee in 1763.

In 1788, after the American Revolutionary War, the state revoked the Wampanoag ability to self-govern, considering it a failure. It appointed a supervisory committee consisting of five European-American members, with no Wampanoag. In 1834, the state returned a certain degree of self-government to the First Nations People, and although the First Nations People were far from autonomous, they continued in this manner. To support assimilation, in 1842 the state violated the Nonintercourse Act when it illegally allocated plots from 2,000 acres (8.1 km^{2}) of their communal 13,000 acres (53 km^{2}), to be distributed in 60-acre (240,000 m^{2}) parcels to each household for subsistence farming, although New England communities were adopting other types of economies. The state passed laws to try to control white encroachment on the reservation; some stole wood from its forests. A large region, once rich in wood, fish, and game, it was considered highly desirable by the whites. With competition between whites and the Wampanoag, conflicts were more frequent than for more isolated native settlements elsewhere in the state. In 1870, each member of the Mashpee tribe over the age of 18 was granted 60 acres of land for private ownership, effectively dismantling the thousands of acres of common tribal lands, and by 1871, non-Mashpee land ownership of the choicest portions of land purchased from impoverished Mashpee, leading to significant loss of Mashpee land ownership.

==== Wampanoag on Martha's Vineyard ====
On Martha's Vineyard in the 18th and 19th centuries, there were three reservations—Chappaquiddick, Christiantown and Gay Head. The Chappaquiddick Reservation was part of a small island of the same name and was located on the eastern point of that island. As the result of the sale of land in 1789, the natives lost valuable areas, and the remaining land was distributed among the Indian residents in 1810. In 1823 the laws were changed, in order to hinder those trying to get rid of the natives and to implement a visible beginning of a civic organization. Around 1849, they owned 692 acres (2.80 km^{2}) of infertile land, and many of the residents moved to nearby Edgartown, so that they could practice a trade and obtain some civil rights.

Christiantown was originally a praying town on the northwest side of Martha's Vineyard, northwest of Tisbury. In 1849 the reservation still consisted of 390 acres (1.6 km^{2}), of which all but 10 were distributed among the residents. The land, kept under community ownership, yielded very few crops and the tribe members left it to get paying jobs in the cities. Wampanoag oral history tells that Christiantown was wiped out in 1888 by a smallpox epidemic.

The third reservation on Martha's Vineyard was constructed in 1711 by the New England Company (founded in 1649) to Christianize the natives. They bought land for the Gay Head natives who had lived there since before 1642. There was considerable dispute about how the land should be cultivated, as the colony had leased the better sections to the whites at low interest. The original goal of creating an undisturbed center for missionary work was quickly forgotten. The state finally created a reservation on a peninsula on the western point of Martha's Vineyard and named it Gay Head. This region was connected to the main island by an isthmus; it enabled the isolation desired by the Wampanoag. In 1849 they had 2,400 acres (9.7 km^{2}) there, of which 500 acres were distributed among the tribe members. The rest was communal property. In contrast to the other reservation groups, the tribe had no guardian or headman. When they needed advice on legal questions, they asked the guardian of the Chappaquiddick Reservation, but other matters they handled themselves. The band used usufruct title, meaning that members had no legal claim to their land and allowed the tribal members free rein over their choice of land, as well as over cultivation and building, in order to make their ownership clear. They did not allow whites to settle on their land. They made strict laws regulating membership in the tribe. As a result, they were able to strengthen the groups' ties to each other, and they did not lose their tribal identity until long after other groups had lost theirs.

The Wampanoag on Nantucket Island were almost completely destroyed by an unknown plague in 1763; the last Nantucket Wampanoag died in 1855.

== Sachems of the Wampanoag ==
| Indigene Name | Name of Colonizators | Time of Reign | Affinity | Remarks |
|---|---|---|---|---|
| Wasamegin | Massasoit | before 1621–1662 | | Brother 'Quadequina' as Co-Sachem |
| Wamsutta | Alexander Pokanoket | 1662 | Son of the Predecessor | |
| Metacomet | Philip Pokanoket | 1662–1676 | Brother of the Predecessor | |

== Current status ==
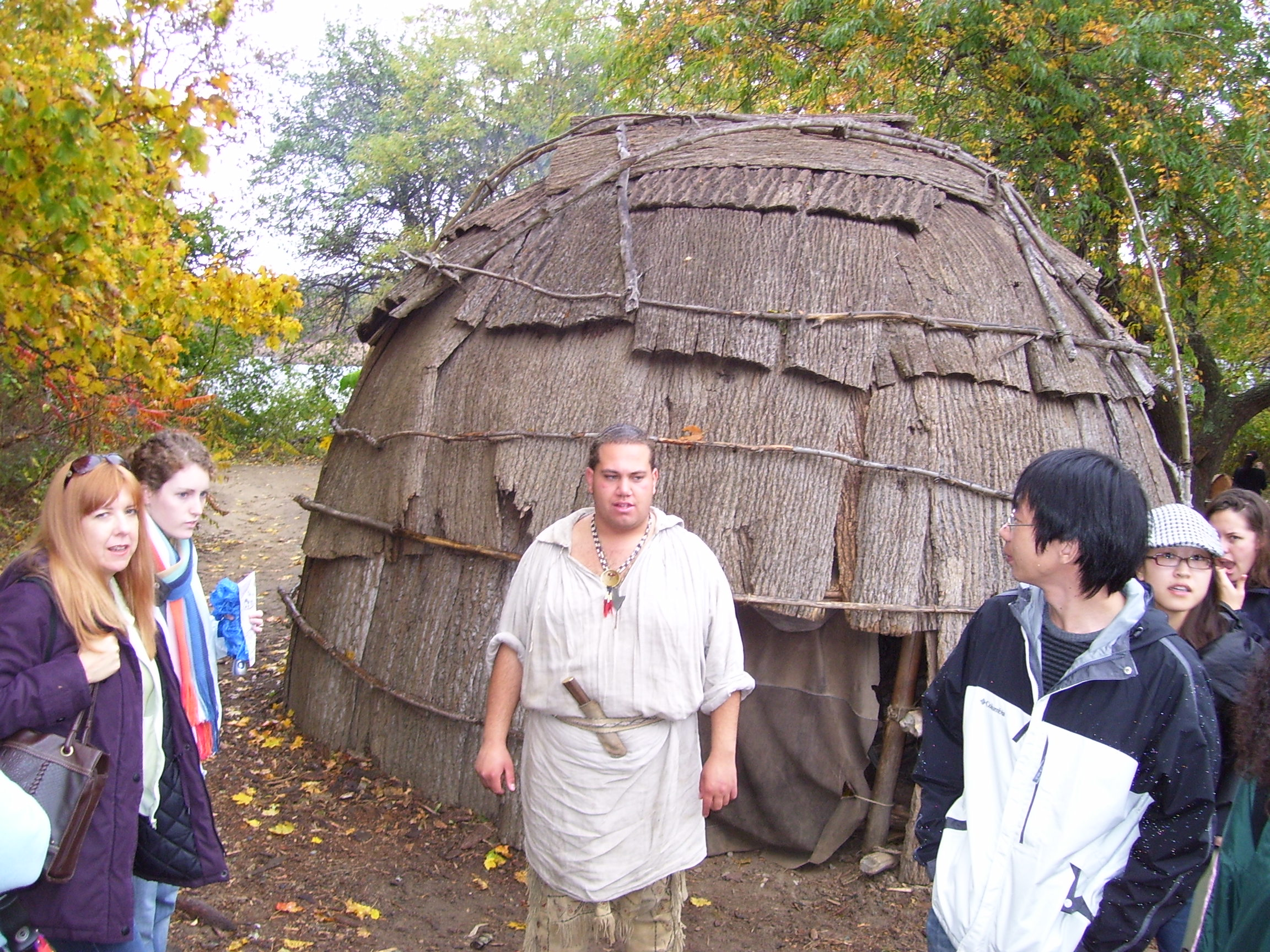
Wampanoag educator at Plimoth Patuxet

Today, there are two federally recognized Wampanoag tribes and one state-recognized Wampanoag tribe.

A project titled "Massachusetts Native Peoples and the Social Contract: A Reassessment for Our Times" began in 2015 to serve as an updated report on the cultural, linguistic, and economic state of Wampanoag peoples, including those from federally and non-federally recognized tribes.

=== Federally recognized Wampanoag tribes ===
==== Mashpee Wampanoag Tribe ====
The Mashpee Wampanoag Tribe has about 3,200 enrolled citizens. The Mashpee Wampanoag Tribal Council was established in 1972 under the leadership of its first president, Russell "Fast Turtle" Peters. In 1974, the Council petitioned the Bureau of Indian Affairs for recognition. In 1976, the tribe sued the Town of Mashpee for the return of ancestral homelands. The case was lost, but the tribe continued to pursue federal recognition for three decades.

Since 1924, they have held an annual powwow at the beginning of July in Mashpee. This first powwow was held at the New Light Baptist Church, at the time called Pondville Church, in Pondville, Massachusetts.

In 2000, the Mashpee Wampanoag council was headed by chairman Glenn Marshall. Marshall led the group until 2007 when it was disclosed that he had a prior rape conviction, had lied about having a military record, and was under investigation associated for improprieties associated with the tribe's casino lobbying efforts. Marshall was succeeded by tribal council vice chair Shawn Hendricks. He held the position until Marshall pleaded guilty in 2009 to federal charges of embezzlement, wire fraud, mail fraud, tax evasion, and election finance law violations. He steered tens of thousands of dollars in illegal campaign contributions to politicians through the tribe's hired lobbyist Jack Abramoff, who was convicted of numerous charges in a much larger scheme. Following the arrests of Abramoff and Marshall, the newly recognized Mashpee Tribe led by new chair Shawn Hendricks, continued to work with Abramoff lobbyist colleague Kevin A. Ring pursuing their Indian gaming-related interests. Ring was subsequently convicted on corruption charges linked to his work for the Mashpee band. Tribal elders who had sought access to the tribal council records detailing the council's involvement in this scandal via a complaint filed in Barnstable Municipal Court were shunned by the council and banned them from the tribe for seven years.

In 2009, the tribe elected council member Cedric Cromwell to the position of council chair and president. Cromwell ran a campaign based on reforms and distancing himself from the previous chairmen, even though he had served as a councilor for the prior six years during which the Marshall and Abramoff scandals took place – including voting for the shunning of tribe members who tried to investigate. A challenge to Cromwell's election by defeated candidates following allegations of tampering with voting and enrollment records was filed with the Tribal Court, and Cromwell's administration has been hampered by a series of protest by Elders over casino-related finances.

The Mashpee Wampanoag tribal offices are located in Mashpee on Cape Cod. After decades of legal disputes, the Mashpee Wampanoag obtained provisional recognition as an Indian tribe from the Bureau of Indian Affairs in April 2006, and official Federal recognition in February 2007. Tribal members own some land, as well as land held in common by Wampanoag descendants at both Chapaquddick and Christiantown. Descendants have also purchased land in Middleborough, Massachusetts, upon which the tribe under Glenn A. Marshall's leadership had lobbied to build a casino. The tribe has moved its plans to Taunton, Massachusetts, but their territorial rights have been challenged by the Pocasset Wampanoag Tribe of the Pokanoket Nation, an organization not recognized as a tribe.

But Indian gaming operations are regulated by the National Indian Gaming Commission established by the Indian Gaming Regulatory Act. It contains a general prohibition against gaming on lands acquired into trust after October 17, 1988. The tribe's attempts to gain approvals have been met with legal and government approval challenges.

The Wampanoag Tribe's plan as of 2011 had agreement for financing by the Malaysian Genting Group and has the political support of Massachusetts Senator John Kerry, Massachusetts Governor Deval Patrick, and former Massachusetts Congressman Bill Delahunt, who is working as a lobbyist to represent the casino project. Both Kerry and Delahunt received campaign contributions from the Wampanoag Tribe in transactions authorized by Glenn Marshall as part of the Abramoff lobbying scandal.

In November 2011, the Massachusetts legislature passed a law to license up to three sites for gaming resort casinos and one for a slot machine parlor. The Wampanoag are given a "headstart" to develop plans for a casino in southeastern part of the state.

A December 2021 ruling from the United States Department of the Interior gives the Mashpee Wampanoag "substantial control" over 320 acres on Cape Cod. The Obama administration had put the land in federal trust, but the Trump administration reversed that decision. A federal judge blocked that action and the federal government appealed, but the Biden administration dropped the appeal.

==== Wampanoag Tribe of Gay Head (Aquinnah) ====
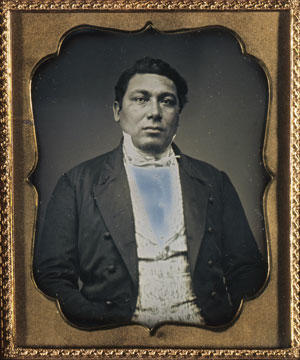
Amos Hoskins, an Aquinnah Wampanoag Whaling Captain

The Wampanoag Tribe of Gay Head (Aquinnah) are headquartered in Aquinnah, Massachusetts. Aquinnah translates as "land under the hill". They are the only Wampanoag tribe to have a formal land-in-trust reservation, which is located on Martha's Vineyard. Their reservation consists of 485 acres (1.96 km^{2}), located on the outermost southwest part of the island. In 1972, Aquinnah Wampanoag descendants formed the Wampanoag Tribal Council of Gay Head, Inc., to achieve self-determination and federal recognition. The Bureau of Indian Affairs recognized the tribe in 1987. The Aquinnah tribe has about 901 enrolled citizens.

Gladys Widdiss (Aquinnah Wampanoag), a tribal historian and potter, served as the President of the Wampanoag Tribe of Gay Head from 1978 to 1987. The Aquinnah Wampanoag Tribe of Gay Head won federal recognition from the United States government during her tenure. Under Widdis, the Aquinnah Wampanoag also acquired the Herring Creek, the Gay Head Cliffs, and the cranberry bogs surrounding Gay Head (now called Aquinnah) during her presidency.

The Aquinnah Wampanoag are led by tribal council chair Cheryl Andrews-Maltais, who was elected to the post in November 2007. In 2010, Andrews-Maltais put forward plans for the development of an Aquinnah reservation casino, which was met with opposition by state and local officials.

=== State-recognized tribe ===
The Herring Pond Wampanoag Tribe is a state-recognized tribe based in Plymouth, Massachusetts. Massachusetts Governor Maura Healey granted them state recognition on November 19, 2024, through Executive Order 637.

== Cultural heritage groups ==
Numerous organizations that self-identify as Native American tribes identify as Wampanoag. The Massachusetts' Commission on Indian Affairs works with some of these organizations.

Some groups have submitted letters of intent to petition for federal acknowledgment, but none have actively petitioned for federal acknowledgment. Unrecognized groups who identify as being of Wampanoag descent include:

1. Assawompsett-Nemasket Band of Wampanoags
2. Assonet Band of Wampanoags
3. Chappaquiddick Wampanoag Tribe, South Yarmouth, MA (Letter of Intent to Petition 05/21/2007)
4. Massachuset-Ponkapoag Tribal Council, Holliston, MA
5. Nova Scotia Wampanoag Council, Clark's Harbour, NS
6. Pocasset Wampanoag Indian Tribe, Great Falls, MA. (Letter of Intent to Petition 1/23/1995)
7. Seaconke Wampanoag Tribe, Warwick, RI (Letter of Intent to Petition 10/29/1998)

== Demographics ==
| Year | Number | Note | Source |
|---|---|---|---|
| 1610 | 6,600 | mainland 3,600; islands 3,000 | James Mooney |
| 1620 | 5,000 | mainland 2,000 (after the epidemics); islands 3,000 | unknown |
| 1677 | 400 | mainland (after King Philip's War) | general estimate |
| 2000 | 2,336 | Wampanoag | US Census |
| 2010 | 2,756 | Wampanoag | US Census |

== Notable historical Wampanoag people ==
Note: Contemporary people are listed under their specific tribes.

- Askamaboo, 17th-century female Nantucket sachem
- Crispus Attucks, first person killed in Boston Massacre
- Caleb Cheeshahteaumuck, the first American Indian to graduate from Harvard College
- Corbitant, 17th-century sachem of the Pocasset
- Massasoit, the sachem who befriended the Mayflower pilgrims
- Metacom or Metacomet, Massasoit's second son, also called Philip, who initiated King Philip's War (1675–1676)
- John Sassamon, early translator
- Wamsutta, Massasoit's oldest son, also known as Alexander
- Weetamoo of the Pocasset, a woman who supported Metacom and drowned crossing the Taunton River during King Philip's War; one of her husbands was Wamsutta, a brother to King Phillip (Metacom)

== Representation in other media ==
- Tashtego was a fictional Wampanoag harpooneer from Gay Head in Herman Melville's novel Moby Dick.
- Wampanoag history from 1621 to King Philip's War is depicted in the first part of We Shall Remain, a 2009 documentary.

== See also ==
- The City of Columbus was an 1884 shipwreck where a group of Wampanoag risked their lives to save passengers
- Briggs Report (1849)
- Cuttyhunk
- Earle Report
- Federally recognized tribes
- List of early settlers of Rhode Island
- Native American tribes in Massachusetts
- Old Indian Meeting House, 1684 church
- State recognized tribes in the United States
