= Cedric Cromwell =

- Born: Cedric D. Cromwell; 1965 (age 60–61); Boston, Massachusetts, U.S.
- Other names: Running Bear, Qaqeemasq
- Known for: Tenure as tribal council chairman of the Mashpee Wampanoag
- Criminal charges: Extortion under color of official right (3 counts); Conspiracy to commit extortion under color of official right (1 count); Filing a false tax return (4 counts)
- Penalty: Prison (42 months) and restitution ($270,763)

Cedric Cromwell (also known as Running Bear, or Qaqeemasq in Wôpanâak; born 1965) is the former tribal council chairman of the Mashpee Wampanoag tribe of Massachusetts. Elected in 2009 as chairman, Cedric Cromwell was the head of the official elected government for the 2,600-member federally recognized tribe. Cromwell was removed from office in 2020 after being federally indicted; he was subsequently convicted of extortion and sentenced to prison.

== Biography ==
Cromwell is the son of James Oliver Cromwell of Yarmouth, Nova Scotia, and Constance "Lone Eagless" Tobey-Cromwell of Dorchester, Massachusetts. She served as the Wampanoag tribal secretary.

== Tribal activities ==
Cromwell was elected to the tribal council and served for eight years before being elected chairman in 2009. He was elected as part of a reform movement following the resignation of the former chairman, Glenn Marshall, who pleaded guilty on "federal embezzling, mail fraud and election finance charges".

Cromwell gained financial backing for the tribe's casino development effort from the Malaysian billionaire Lim Goh Tong and his Kien Huat Realty arm of the Genting Group. The chairman hired the former U.S. representative Bill Delahunt to lobby on behalf of the tribe.

Because the Wampanoag have long been without a reservation, Cromwell was committed to securing federal lands in trust for the tribe. Under state and federal gaming laws, such land is necessary as a sovereign base for the tribal plan to establish a gaming casino resort, with plans to include hotels, restaurants, slot machine parlors and retail shopping. The previous council chair, Glenn Marshall, had similar proposals for a Mashpee Wampanoag land-in-trust reservation, including the establishment of an international free-trade zone and Native American wholesale banking operations independent from state and federal regulators.

Cromwell traveled to Washington, D.C., to lobby on Native American issues. He supported the Native CLASS Act to improve education of Native American children, and the equal treatment of all Indian tribes by the federal government. He testified before the Senate Committee on Indian Affairs. He worked to gain Congressional approval for legislation to enable the Wampanoag to acquire land for the government to hold in trust. However, the Supreme Court decision of Carcieri v. Salazar (2012) ruled that tribes not under federal jurisdiction in 1934 could not acquire land that could be classified as trust land by the Department of Interior. Any land they acquired would be treated in common with other privately held land.

=== Criminal charges and conviction ===
In November 2020, Cromwell and the owner of an architectural firm in Providence, Rhode Island, were arrested and subsequently indicted for multiple bribery and extortion charges; Cromwell was removed from his tribal post. In May 2022, Cromwell was convicted of "three counts of extortion under color of official right and one count of conspiracy to commit extortion under color of official right". In July 2025, Cromwell pleaded guilty to four counts of filing a false tax return. In November 2025, Cromwell was sentenced to 42 months in prison, ordered to pay $270,763 in restitution, and ordered to pay $51,849 in a forfeiture money judgment.

== See also ==
- Deval Patrick#Casino gaming
- Genting Group#Resort and casino properties
- Bill Delahunt#Lobbying
