= Herring Pond Wampanoag Tribe =

State-recognized tribe in Massachusetts

- Named after: Great Herring Pond, Wampanoag people
- Formation: 1997
- Founded at: Plymouth, Massachusetts
- Type: state-recognized tribe, nonprofit organization
- Tax ID no.: EIN 26-2227626
- Headquarters: Plymouth, Massachusetts
- Location: United States
- Official language: English
- President: Melissa A. Ferrietti
- Subsidiaries: Herring Pond Wampanoag Tribal Council, Inc.
- Affiliations: National Congress of American Indians
- Website: herringpondtribe.org

The Herring Pond Wampanoag Tribe is a state-recognized tribe and nonprofit organization in Massachusetts. The members of the tribe are descendants of Wampanoag people. They are based in Plymouth, Massachusetts. Their nonprofit organization is named the Herring Pond Wampanoag Tribal Council, Inc.

The Herring Pond Wampanoag Tribe is not a federally recognized tribe. However, they gained formal state recognition on November 19, 2024, through Massachusetts Governor Maura Healey's Executive Order No. 637. Before 2024, the Herring Pond was recognized as a Native American tribal group in Massachusetts by the Commonwealth's Commission on Indian Affairs (MCIA), although this recognition lacked the force of law. The Herring Pond Wampanoag Tribe has not submitted a documented petition to the Bureau of Indian Affairs for federal acknowledgment through the administrative procedures under 25 C.F.R. Part 83, one of the three ways a Native American group may become federally recognized.

== History ==
In 1838, a petition signed by John V. Conet and other members of the tribe requested assistance from the state to build a schoolhouse, noting that they had previously sent children to a white school until they were "deprived that privilege in part." The petitioners offered an old meeting house for use as a schoolhouse, although the meeting house was in need of repairs. George N. Briggs, Commissioner of The District Of Marshpee and the Treasurer of The Herring Pond Indians, and Charles Marston, Commissioner of the Herring Pond Plantation, submitted a report in 1849 on the financial claims and expenditures made by members of the tribe and noted that the territory of the community of 60 people totaled about 2,500 acres.

=== Earle Report ===
The Report to the governor and Council, concerning the Indians of the Commonwealth, under the act of April 6, 1859, written by state commissioner of Indian affairs John Milton Earle, included a report on the Herring Pond Indians, a tribe that lived on the east side of Herring Pond near Cape Cod Bay and Sandwich. Milton reported that 67 people lived in the community and that the community experienced a high mortality rate. In 1850, Funds were given to the community by the state, and Earle expressed concern that the funding, which was at $7,604.63 in 1859, would be depleted within a few years. Additionally, the Williams Fund of Harvard College donated $200 annually to provide a missionary to serve the community. Children in the community attended local schools, and members of the tribe worked in carpentry, as seamen, and as farmers or laborers.

=== Newspapers ===
Newspaper reports from the 19th century noted a community of Indigenous and African American people at Great Herring Pond, which may reference the Herring Pond Wampanoag Tribe. A charity was created in 1811 to support a group called the Herring Pond Indians. In 1857, a church was dedicated at Herring Pond by Rev. William Jackson of New Bedford and Rev. E. Kelley of Philadelphia, both Black ministers. The article announcing the church dedication noted that the crowd consisted of Indigenous and African American people. By 1869, the community was referred to as the Herring Pond Indians, with their population listed as 67 inhabitants living on 3,000 acres of land between Herring Pond and Cape Cod Bay.

In May 1894, the community of Indigenous inhabitants in the Great Herring Pond village spoke out against what they perceived as a violation of their fishing rights, claiming that citizens of Sandwich and Bourne were abusing their river access. An agreement regarding herring fisheries had been established years prior to the conflict, stipulating that each family in the aforementioned towns and the Great Herring Pond village would receive a barrel of fish during the Alewife migration season. However, residents of the Great Herring Pond village claimed to have received only their promised amount.

=== Digital Records ===
A database called The Native Northeast Portal was established by researchers to collect digitized and transcribed records relating to Indigenous communities of the Northeast. These primary source materials originated in partner institutions collaborating with the portal to make records more accessible. Notably, these records are annotated and reviewed by contemporary descendent community representatives. Documents relating to the Herring Pond Wampanoag Tribe have been collected within the portal, including an 1811 contract that referenced an Indigenous community at Great Herring Pond as well as other contracts, correspondence, and genealogical records. A full listing of materials available relating to this community is on a page that includes an introduction by representatives of the Herring Pond Wampanoag Tribe.

== Nonprofit organization ==
The Herring Pond Wampanoag Tribal Council, Inc. was incorporated as a 501(c)(3) nonprofit organization in 1997. Kathryn Hunt of Plymouth, Massachusetts, is the registered agent.

The officers include:

- President/Chair: Melissa A. Harding Ferretti
- Treasurer: Kerina Silva
- Vice-chair: Hazel Harding Currence
- Secretary:
- Member: Ronald Harding
- Member:
- Member:
- Medicine Man: Troy Currence.

== Land ==
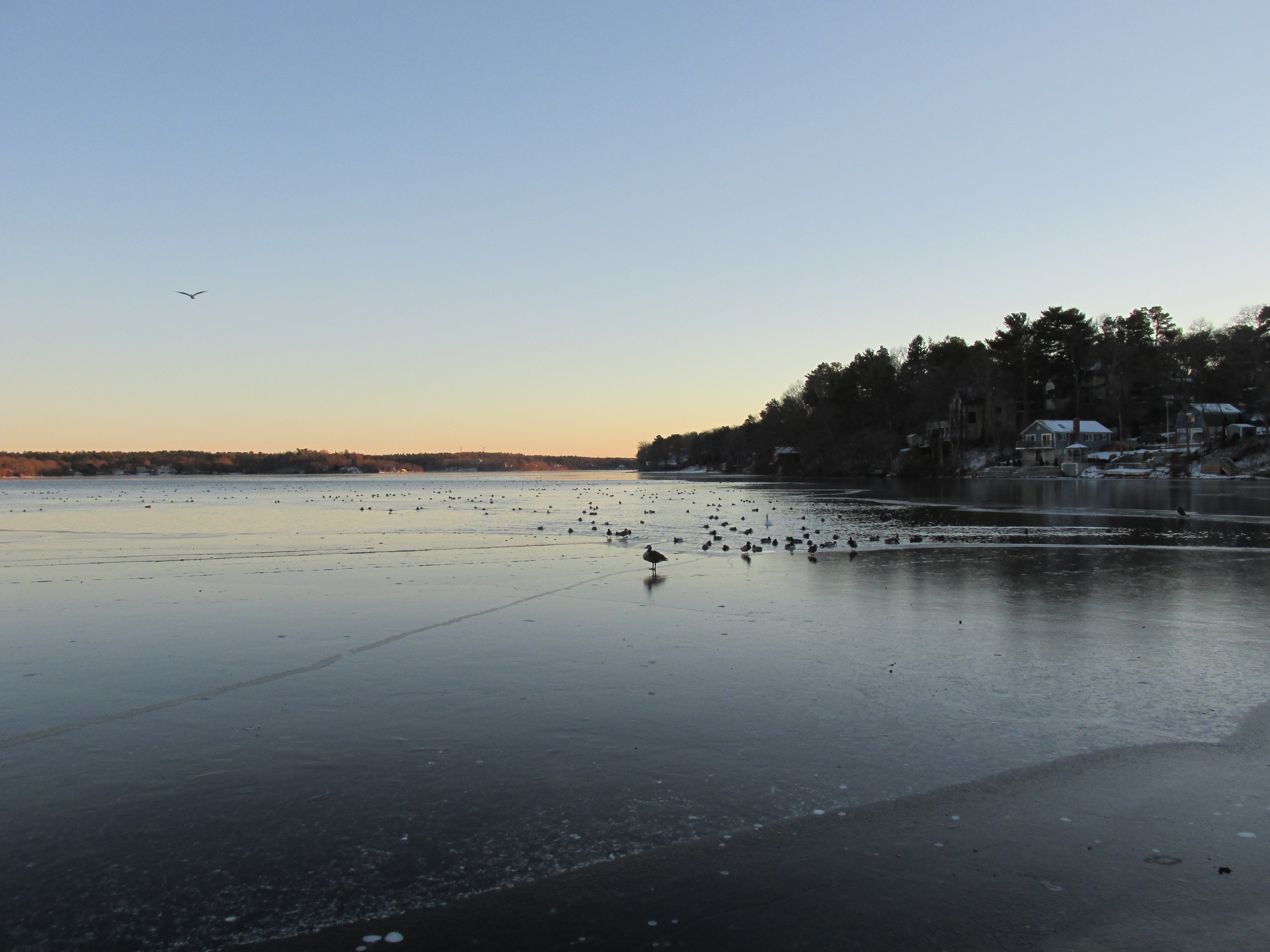
The Great Herring Pond, Cedarville, Massachusetts

The Herring Pong Wampanoag Tribe, Inc. has asserted historic land claims to three parcels of land totaling approximately 3,000 acres. An Act Concerning the Plantation of Herring Pond was passed in 1850, identifying lands belonging to the Herring Pond Indians and establishing that the land would be partitioned by the commissioner of the district of Marshpee and two individuals appointed by the Massachusetts state governor. Under this act, each family would receive 15 acres of land for a home lot, with the remaining land serving as common land. In 1977, members of the tribe began to consult legal means of restoring land ownership following successful court cases in the restoration of Indigenous land ownership across the country. The Town of Plymouth deeded the Pondville Indian Meetinghouse and a six-acre property near the Great Herring Pond to the Herring Pong Wampanoag Tribe, Inc. in 2022.

In December 2018, ownership of a six-acre historical burial ground in Plymouth, Massachusetts, was transferred to the Herring Pond Wampanoag Tribe, Inc. This burial ground included descendants of revered elders in the Herring Pond Wampanoag Tribe. The transfer of the burial ground to the tribe required the participation of the tribe in a bidding process for the land and consultation from city officials due to the lack of precedence in transferring a burial ground to a tribe. Members of the tribe have since worked to restore and protect the cemetery grounds.

== Affiliations ==
The Herring Pond Wampanoag Tribe is a member of the National Congress of American Indians, who lists it as being "state recognized" and in the Northeast Region.

The federally recognized Mashpee Wampanoag Tribe considers the Herring Pond Wampanoag Tribe to be a "sister tribe". After the Commonwealth of Massachusetts granted state recognition to the Herring Pond Wampanoag Tribe in 2024, the Mashpee Wampanoag Tribe issued a media release stating they considered it "a monumental day for the entire Wampanoag Nation".

== Activities ==
The Herring Pond Wampanoag were historically one of the praying towns that the Commonwealth of Massachusetts set up in the colonial era.

The Herring Pond Wampanoag Tribe is involved in the Wampanoag Language Reclamation Project. In 1924, they helped organize the annual powwow at the beginning of July. The first few powwows were held at the Herring Pond Wampanoag Meetinghouse before expanding and moving to Mashpee, Massachusetts.

In 2020, the Sheehan Family Companies of Kingston, Massachusetts, awarded the Herring Pond Wampanoag Tribe a three-year grant of $156,000 "to preserve, promote, and protect the cultural, spiritual, and economic well-being of its tribal members, educate youth, and promote awareness among the public about tribal history and rights."

The Nellie Mae Education Foundation in Quincy, Massachusetts, donated $100,000 in operating funds to the Herring Pond Wampanoag Tribe, Inc. in 2021.

The Native Youth Empowerment Foundation of Massachusetts awarded the Herring Pond Wampanoag Tribe, Inc. a $145,00 Capacity Building Grant in 2022 "to preserve, promote and protect the cultural, spiritual and economic well-being of its tribal youth and preservation of its tribal homeland. In 2023, the tribe partnered with the Plymouth Public Library and Community Art Collaborative to create a coloring book that presented Herring Pond Wampanoag history to the community. This project was a continuation of a 2021 project called "Illuminating Stories" that highlighted Herring Pond Wampanoag history.

An annual mishoon burn is held by the Herring Pond Wampanoag Tribe in order to foster intertribal relations within the Herring Pond Wampanoag tribe and other Wampanoag sister tribes.

== See also ==
- State-recognized tribes in the United States
- Frank Gouldsmith Speck photograph collection, containing images of the Herring Pond Wampanoag people
- 400 Years of Wampanoag History by Melissa Ferretti
