= Mashpee Wampanoag Tribe =

Native American tribe in Massachusetts

Mâseepee Wôpanâak

Total population
- 3,200

Regions with significant populations
- United States (Massachusetts)

Languages
- English, Wampanoag

Religion
- traditional tribal religion

Related ethnic groups
- other Wampanoag people

The Mashpee Wampanoag Tribe (formerly Mashpee Wampanoag Indian Tribal Council, Inc.) is one of two federally recognized tribes of Wampanoag people in Massachusetts, United States. Recognized in 2007, they are headquartered in Mashpee on Cape Cod. The other Wampanoag tribe is the Wampanoag Tribe of Gay Head (Aquinnah) on Martha's Vineyard.

The tribe has its own health services, police force, court system, and education departments.

In March 2024, the Mashpee Wampanoag Tribe had approximately 3,200 enrolled citizens. Their 170 acres in Mashpee, as well as an additional 150 acres in Taunton, Massachusetts, were taken into trust on their behalf by the US Department of Interior in 2015, establishing these parcels as reservation land.

== History ==
The historic Algonquian-speaking Wampanoag are one of 69 tribes of the original Wampanoag Nation; they are the Native people encountered by the English colonists of the New Plymouth Colony in the 17th century. The Wampanoag also controlled a considerable amount of coastal area. They are one of the several Algonquian-speaking tribal nations in what are now considered Massachusetts and Rhode Island. The Wampanoag and English (later European Americans) have interacted and shaped each other's cultures for centuries, with marriage between the groups also taking place.

English colonists began to settle in and around the traditional tribal community of present-day Mashpee, Massachusetts, which was also called Marshapoag (Big Pond), and Saukatukett (South Sea) when Rev Leverech of Sandwich began preaching there in the 1630s. He was later replaced in 1658 by missionary Rev Richard Bourne, from the neighboring town of Sandwich. In 1629, the Mashpee Wampanoag, along with eight other Wampanoag tribes, granted “Indian Title” to the King of England to a tract of land that would become Plymouth Colony. In 1660, Bourne assisted the tribe in codifying the territory in at least one of two deeds. Beginning in 1665, the Wampanoag, petitioned the General Court for Mashpee’s status as a ‘praying town’, a form of government established by missionary Rev John Eliot and confirmed by the General Court of the colony. In May 1666, a delegation of English leaders, including Richard Bourne, John Eliot and his son, John Cotton, Thomas Mayhew, and two Wampanoag interpreters convened a week-long meeting in Mashpee to hear from the Tribe regarding their petition (hearing the confessions) and report back to the General Court. The petition being granted, the Mashpees now governed themselves via the law of ‘praying towns’. Praying Town status afforded tribes protection of the English Crown and a greater chance to remain on their homelands. While this helped to maintain tenure in the land, these new laws also patterned English systems of justice and took away freedoms of the Wampanoag to live traditionally.

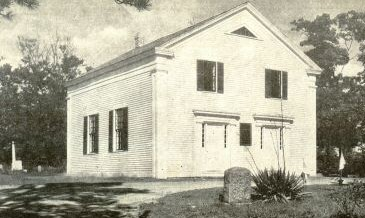
The "Old Indian Meeting House", built in 1684 at Mashpee, is the oldest Native American church in the United States.

Following the Wampanoag defeat in King Philip's War (1675–1676), those on the mainland were resettled with the Sakonnet in present-day Rhode Island. Other Wampanoag were forced to settle in the praying towns, such as Mashpee, in Barnstable County on Cape Cod. The colonists sold many Wampanoag men into slavery in the Caribbean, and enslaved women and children in New England.

The colonists designated Mashpee on Cape Cod as the largest Native American reservation in Massachusetts. The town's name is an Anglicization of a Native name, Mâseepee: mâs meaning "large" and, upee meaning "water." It is named for Mashpee/Wakeby Pond, the largest fresh water pond on Cape Cod.

In 1763, the British Crown designated Mashpee as a plantation of the Massachusetts Bay Colony, against the will of the Wampanoag. By this designation, the Crown gave the colonial district of Mashpee authority to integrate into its territory the area governed by the Mashpee Wampanoag. The colony gave the natives the "right" to elect their own officials to maintain order in their area, but otherwise subjected them to colonial government. The Wampanoag population of the plantation declined steadily due to social disruption and infectious disease contracted from the colonists. They also suffered from continuing encroachment on their lands by the English.

Following the American Revolutionary War, the State in 1788 revoked Mashpee self-government, which European-American officials considered a failure. They appointed a committee of overseers, consisting of five European-American members, to supervise the Mashpee. When William Apess, a Pequot Methodist preacher, helped the Mashpee Wampanoag lead a peaceful protest in 1837 against the overseers, the governor threatened a military response. Rule by the overseers resulted in the loss of additional Wampanoag lands.

Due to intermarriage between Black and Wampanoag people dating to the 1700s, many Mashpee Wampanoag people have African ancestry.

=== 19th-century restrictions and land loss ===
In 1834, the state returned a certain level of self-government to the Wampanoag, although they were not completely autonomous. With the idea that emulating European-American farming would encourage assimilation, in 1842, the state broke up some of the Wampanoag communal land. It distributed 2,000 acres (8.1 km^{2}) of their 13,000-acre (53 km^{2}) property in allotments of 60-acre (240,000 m^{2}) parcels to heads of households, so that each family could have individual ownership for subsistence farming.

The legislature passed laws prohibiting European Americans from encroaching on Wampanoag land, but the state did not enforce these. The competing settlers also stole wood from the reservation. The Wampanoag held a large region, once rich in wood, fish and game, which was desired by white settlers. They envied the growing community of Mashpee. The Mashpee Indians suffered more conflicts with their white neighbors than did other more isolated or less desirable Indian settlements in the state.

In 1870, the state, against a vote of the tribe, incorporated the Town of Mashpee as a town. It was the second-to-last jurisdiction on the Cape to undergo the process. Mashpee Wampanoag held every seat in Town Government until 1967. With European Americans moving to Mashpee in growing numbers and taking seats in town government, ultimately the Mashpee Wampanoag lost control of town government. The majority of the Tribe’s citizens live in and around Mashpee today. Many also worked on whaling and other ships that operated from Cape and other Massachusetts ports in the 19th century. They continue to identify as Mashpee Wampanoag by their common culture. Census rolls of the Tribe grew from marriages and mixed-race children as they formed unions with neighbors.

=== 20th century ===
In the early 1900s, tribal members Ebenezer Quippish and Nelson D. Simons helped lead a cultural revival in Mashpee and to rededicate the Old Indian Meeting House.

Beginning in the 1970s, the Mashpee Wampanoag worked to regain its political power; it sought federal recognition of its tribal status by the federal government. The Mashpee Wampanoag Tribal Council, Inc was incorporated in 1972 under the leadership of its first president, Russell "Fast Turtle" Peters. In 1974, the Council petitioned the Bureau of Indian Affairs for recognition. Like other "landless" tribes of the Atlantic Coast area, they encountered difficulties documenting their continuity. The recognition process required documentation of continued existence since first contact with European arrivals. In many areas, outsiders assumed that, as tribes became multi-racial, they no longer were "Indians." But the Mashpee Wampanoag had experience in continuing their culture, and most of their descendants identified as Wampanoag. The federal acknowledgment petition documents were a collection of 54,000 pages before the petition was considered by the Department of Interior's Office of Federal Acknowledgement.

In 1976, the tribe filed a landmark land claim lawsuit, suing the Town of Mashpee for the return of ancestral homelands. The US District Court ruled that, lacking federal recognition as a tribe, the Mashpee Wampanoag people had no standing to pursue the land claim. The tribe continued to pursue federal recognition for three decades, gaining it in 2007.

=== 21st century ===
In 2000, the Mashpee Wampanoag Council was headed by chairman Glenn Marshall. Marshall led the group until 2007, when it was disclosed that he had a prior conviction for rape, had lied about having a military record, and was under investigation associated with the tribe's casino lobbying efforts.

Marshall was removed from office by the Tribe and was a succeeded by tribal council vice-chair Shawn Hendricks. He held the position until Marshall pleaded guilty in 2009 to federal charges of embezzling, wire fraud, mail fraud, tax evasion, and election finance law violations. Marshall had steered tens of thousands of dollars in illegal campaign contributions to politicians through the tribe's hired lobbyist Jack Abramoff. The latter was convicted of numerous charges in a much larger fraud scheme associated with Native American gaming, especially related to his representation of a Mississippi tribe.

On May 23, 2007, the Mashpee Tribe gained formal federal recognition as a tribe. Led by its chairman Shawn Hendricks, who was elected to succeed Marshall, tribe representatives worked with Abramoff's lobbyist colleague Kevin A. Ring to pursue a plan to develop Indian gaming, as this seemed a route to generate revenues to help the tribe take care of its people. In 2008, Ring was indicted and convicted on federal corruption charges linked to his work for the Mashpee band.

During this period, there was considerable internal tension within the tribe. Tribal elders sought access to the tribal council records detailing the council's involvement in the Ring scandal, filing a complaint in Barnstable Municipal Court. The tribal council voted to formally "shun" these members, banning these elders from the tribe for seven years. The federal government had also sought records from the tribe as part of its 2007 investigation into Abramoff and his colleagues.

In 2009 the tribe elected council member Cedric Cromwell to the position of council chair and president. Cromwell's campaign had promised reforms. He worked to distance himself from the previous chairmen, although he had served on the tribal council for the prior six years during which the Marshall and Abramoff scandals took place. He was among those who voted to shun tribal members who tried to investigate. A challenge to Cromwell's election by defeated candidates, following allegations of tampering with voting and enrollment records, was filed with the Tribal Court.

Cromwell's administration has been hampered by a series of protests by elders over casino-related finances.

Meanwhile, the tribe continued to negotiate with the state to gain a license to develop a casino on its land in Taunton. In 2013, the Mashpee tribe and the state formed a compromise that would see the group giving Massachusetts "17 percent of all casino revenue" generated. However, these payments were tentative, and depended "on the state not licensing a[nother] casino in the region."

In September 2015, the Department of Interior took into trust 321 acres in Mashpee and Taunton, MA as a reservation for the Mashpee Wampanoag, who had held the land in fee simple. As reported by Casino.org, "This is a reclamation of land that was once ours," tribal chairman Cedric Cromwell told The Boston Globe. "Tribal lands once stretched from Cape Ann to Rhode Island, and this new reservation represents only a dot on the map, but it feels really good."

On March 27, 2020, the Bureau of Indian Affairs reportedly told the tribe that their reservation will be dis-established and their land taken out of trust, per an order from Secretary of the Interior David Bernhardt. Cedric Cromwell, the tribal chair, said this action is "unnecessary" and "cruel." "This is an existential crisis for tribes," said Jean-Luc Pierite, of the North American Indian Center of Boston, a Boston-based social services provider and advocacy group. On June 6, a US District Court ruling reversed the Department of Interior's ruling and ordered the DOI to maintain the reservation status of the tribe's 321 acres of land until the department issues a new decision. On February 20, 2021, the federal government decided to drop the legal battle against the Mashpee lands.

On November 13, 2020, the chairman of the Mashpee Wampanoag Tribe and a small business owner from Warwick, Rhode Island, were indicted on two counts of accepting or paying bribes as an agent of an Indian tribal government and one count of conspiring to commit bribery. Chairman Cromwell was also indicted on four counts of extortion under color of official right and one count of conspiring to commit extortion. According to the indictment, Cromwell contracted with an architecture company owned by David DeQuattro, in connection with the Wampanoag Tribe’s plans to build a resort and casino in Taunton.

In May 2021, Brian Weeden was elected chairman of the Mashpee Wampanoag’s Tribal Council, as the youngest person ever to serve in this capacity.

In 2022, in partial resolution of the architectural firm bribery case, former chair Cedric Cromwell was required to repay $210,000 and was sentenced to three years in prison, and David DeQuattro "was sentenced to a year of probation under home confinement."

The Mashpee Wampanoag Tribe considers the Herring Pond Wampanoag Tribe to be a "sister tribe". After the Commonwealth of Massachusetts granted state recognition to the Herring Pond Wampanoag Tribe in 2024, the Mashpee Wampanoag Tribe issued a media release stating they considered it "a monumental day for the entire Wampanoag Nation".

== Citizenship ==
The Mashpee Wampanoag Tribal Council has established criteria for enrollment as a citizen. The tribe requires that a person be able to document descent from recognized citizens, must live in or near Mashpee, and be active in the tribe.

There is currently a moratorium on membership enrollment with no end date in sight.

== Land and casino ==
Location of the land holdings of the Mashpee Wampanoag Tribe

After gaining federal recognition, the tribe lobbied the state for approval to build a casino on their Mashpee land. Indian gaming operations are regulated by the National Indian Gaming Commission established by the Indian Gaming Regulatory Act. It contains a general prohibition against gaming on lands acquired into trust by federally recognized tribes after October 17, 1988, the date of the act. The tribe's attempts to gain approvals have been met with legal and government approval challenges, as it did not continuously control a reservation before this date. It had become landless because of colonial and local Massachusetts town actions against it.

In November 2011, the Massachusetts legislature passed a law to license up to three sites, each in a separate region of the state, for gaming resort casinos and one for a slot machine parlor. The Wampanoag were given a "headstart" to develop plans for a casino in southeastern part of the state.

The tribe proposed a $500 million casino on land owned in Taunton, Massachusetts, which it then had under a purchase agreement. This is about 48 miles driving distance from Mashpee. They were challenged by the Pocasset Wampanoag, which was also seeking an agreement for a casino. The state said it would accept the tribe's bid for a casino at that location, as one of three the state intends to authorize. By 2014, the tribe was completing an FEIS for development of the property in Taunton, as well as property it owns in Mashpee. The latter is to be developed for administrative office needs.

By 2010, the Wampanoag Tribe's plan had agreement for financing by the Malaysian Genting Group. It had gained the political support of Massachusetts Senator John Kerry, Massachusetts Governor Deval Patrick, and former Massachusetts Congressman Bill Delahunt, who is working as a lobbyist to represent the casino project. Both Kerry and Delahunt received campaign contributions from the Wampanoag Tribe in transactions authorized by Glenn Marshall. Marshall was later implicated in the Jack Abramoff lobbying scandal.

In 2025, a welcome center for the First Light Casino development was opened in Taunton, MA. The 2,000-square-foot facility features ten slot machines and is intended to serve as a preview of a future casino.

=== Land trust ===
In September 2015, the Bureau of Indian Affairs, an agency within the U.S. Department of the Interior, approved the tribe's application to take 321 acres of land into federal trust to create the Mashpee Wampanoag reservation; this included 170 acres of land the tribe already controlled in Mashpee and also gave the tribe jurisdiction over 150 newly acquired acres in Taunton.

In February 2016, a group of Taunton property owners filed a lawsuit in U.S. District Court against the Mashpee Wampanoag's plans to build a gaming casino on the tribe's land in Taunton. They challenged the land-into-trust deal, citing Carcieri v. Salazar (2009), a U.S. Supreme Court decision which held that the government could not take land into trust for tribes recognized after the 1934 Indian Reorganization Act. The City of Taunton filed a brief in favor of the casino, as its residents had voted strongly in favor of its development, and Interior Department lawyers brought into question of Congress' original intent in making the 1934 law.

Meanwhile, despite the court challenge, the Mashpee Wampanoag began development of the Taunton site.

In July 2016, the U.S. district court found that the BIA had exceeded its authority, entered summary judgment for the plaintiffs, and ordered the matter remanded to the BIA. In February 2020, the First Circuit Court of Appeals sided with the district court, maintaining that the Department of Interior lacked authority to take tribal land into trust for the benefit of the tribe. On March 27, 2020, the Trump administration announced it would remove over 300 acres of land from the federal trust and take away the designation of "reservation." A hearing was scheduled for U.S. District Court in Washington, D.C., on May 7, 2020.

A federal judge blocked Trump administration actions, a ruling the federal government appealed. The Biden administration dropped the appeal. A December 2021 ruling from the Department of the Interior gives the Mashpee Wampanoag "substantial control" over the land.

== In popular culture ==
A documentary video, Mashpee (1999), describes the effect of 1970s land claims by the Wampanoag.

== Notable Mashpee Wampanoag ==
- Joan Tavares Avant, author, historian
- Jessie Little Doe Baird, linguist
- Sonny Dove, professional basketball player, New York City Basketball Hall of Fame
- Mwalim, musician, writer, and educator

== See also ==
- Native American tribes in Massachusetts
