= Tom Landry =

American football coach and player (1924–2000)

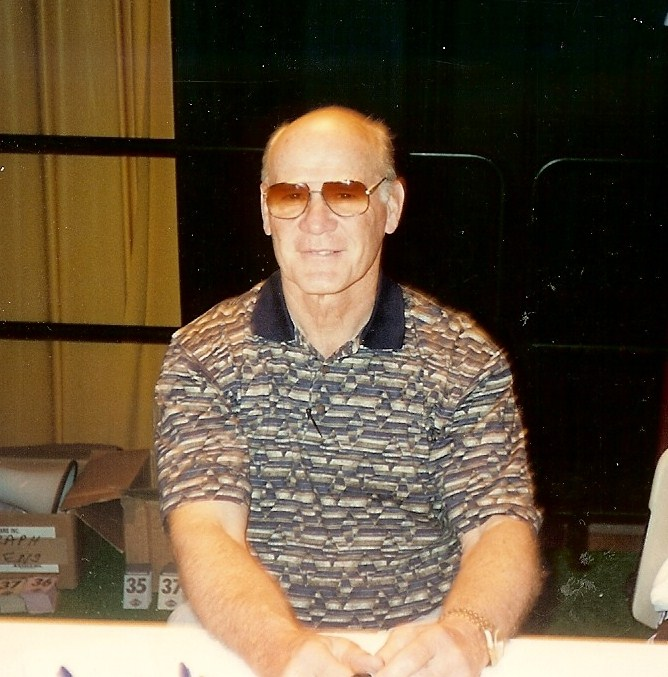
- Landry in 1997

No. 85, 49
- Positions: Safety; Punter

Personal information
- Born: September 11, 1924; Mission, Texas, U.S.
- Died: February 12, 2000 (aged 75); Dallas, Texas, U.S.
- Listed height: 6 ft 1 in (1.85 m)
- Listed weight: 195 lb (88 kg)

Career information
- High school: Mission
- College: Texas (1946–1948)
- NFL draft: 1947: 20th round, 184th overall pick

Career history

Playing
- New York Yankees (1949); New York Giants (1950–1955)

Coaching
- New York Giants (1954–1959) Defensive coordinator; Dallas Cowboys (1960–1988) Head coach

Awards and highlights
- As a player: First-team All-Pro (1954); Pro Bowl (1954); 2× NFL punting yards leader (1952, 1955); AAFC punting yards leader (1949); 55th greatest New York Giant of all-time; Second-team All-SWC (1947); As a head coach: 2× Super Bowl champion (VI, XII); NFL Coach of the Year (1966); UPI NFL Coach of the Year (1966, 1975); SN NFL Coach of the Year (1966); NFL 100th Anniversary All-Time Team; Dallas Cowboys Ring of Honor; As an assistant coach: NFL champion (1956)

Career AAFC/NFL statistics
- Punts: 389
- Punting yards: 15,900
- Punting average: 40.9
- Longest punt: 69
- Interceptions: 32
- Interception yards: 404
- Fumble recoveries: 10
- Defensive touchdowns: 5
- Stats at Pro Football Reference

Head coaching record
- Regular season: 250–162–6 (.605)
- Postseason: 20–16 (.556)
- Career: 270–178–6 (.601)
- Military career
- Allegiance: United States
- Branch: U.S. Army Air Corps
- Service years: 1942–1945
- Rank: Second Lieutenant
- Units: Eighth Air Force; 493d Bombardment Group; 860th Bombardment Squadron
- Conflicts: World War II; Air War Over Europe; Combined Bomber Offensive
- Coaching profile at Pro Football Reference
- Pro Football Hall of Fame

Thomas Wade Landry (/ˈlændri/ LAN-dree; September 11, 1924 – February 12, 2000) was an American professional football coach, player, and World War II bomber pilot. Regarded as one of the greatest head coaches of all time, he was the first head coach of the Dallas Cowboys in the National Football League (NFL), a position he held for 29 seasons. During his coaching career, he created many new formations and methods, such as the now default 4–3 defense that is used by a majority of teams in the NFL, and the "flex defense" system made famous by the "Doomsday Defense" squads he built during his tenure with the Cowboys. His 29 consecutive years from 1960 to 1988 as the coach of one team is an NFL record, (Note: George Halas served as head coach of the Chicago Bears for a total of 40 years in four different stints of ten years each.) along with his 20 consecutive winning seasons, which is considered to be his most impressive professional accomplishment.

In addition to his record 20 consecutive winning seasons from 1966 to 1985, Landry won two Super Bowl titles in Super Bowl VI and XII, five NFC titles, and 13 divisional titles. He compiled a 270–178–6 record, the fifth-most wins all-time for an NFL coach, and his 20 career playoff victories are the third-most of any coach in NFL history. Landry was also named the NFL Coach of the Year in 1966 and the NFC Coach of the Year in 1975.

From 1966 to 1982, a span of 17 years, Dallas played in 12 NFL or NFC Championship games. Furthermore, the Cowboys appeared in 10 NFC Championship games in the 13-year span from 1970 to 1982. Leading the Cowboys to three Super Bowl appearances in four years between 1975 and 1978, and five in nine years between 1970 and 1978, along with being on television more than any other NFL team, resulted in the Cowboys receiving the label of "America's Team", a title he did not appreciate because he felt it would bring on extra motivation from the rest of the league to compete with the Cowboys. He was inducted into the Pro Football Hall of Fame in 1990 as a head coach.

== Early life ==
Born in Mission, Texas, to Ray (an auto mechanic and volunteer fireman) and Ruth (Coffman) Landry, Tom was the second of four children (Robert, Tom, Ruthie, and Jack). Landry's father had suffered from rheumatism, and relocated to the warmer climate of Texas from Illinois. Ray Landry was an athlete, making his mark locally as a pitcher and football player. Tom played quarterback and punter for Mission High School, where he led his team to a 12–0 record in his senior season. The Mission High School football stadium is named Tom Landry Stadium and is home to the Mission Eagles and Mission Patriots which also bears the Pro Football Hall of Fame logo.

Landry attended the University of Texas at Austin as an industrial engineering major. Landry had given thought to enrolling at Mississippi State University, where his friend John Tripson was an All-American, but did not want to be far away from his friends and family in Texas. The main driving force in keeping him from enrolling at Mississippi State University was the notion that it would be too long a travel for his parents to see him play college football.

== U.S. Army Air Corps ==
He interrupted his education after a semester to serve in the United States Army Air Corps during World War II. Landry was inspired to join the armed forces by his brother, Robert Landry, who had enlisted in the Army Air Corps after the attack on Pearl Harbor. While ferrying a B-17 over to England, Robert's plane had gone down over the North Atlantic, close to Iceland. Several weeks passed before the Army was able to officially declare Robert Landry dead. Landry completed basic training at Sheppard Field near Wichita Falls, Texas (now Sheppard AFB), and preflight training at Kelly Air Force Base (now Kelly Field), near San Antonio, Texas. Despite an unnerving first experience flying in a bomber, in which the plane's engine died, Landry committed himself to being a pilot. At the age of 19, Landry was transferred to Sioux City, Iowa, where he qualified as a pilot on the B-17 four-engine bomber. Landry earned his wings and a commission as a Second Lieutenant at Lubbock Army Air Field, and was assigned to the 493d Bombardment Group at RAF Debach, England, in the 860th Bombardment Squadron, part of Eighth Air Force, in Ipswich. From November 1944 to April 1945, he completed a combat tour of 26 missions, (his entire crew went on 29 missions and Landry did not go on three of them), he also survived a crash landing in Belgium after his bomber ran out of fuel.

He returned to his studies at the University of Texas in the fall of 1946. On the football team, he played fullback and defensive back on the Texas Longhorns' bowl game winners on New Year's Day of 1948 and 1949. At UT, he was a member of the Texas Cowboys and Delta Kappa Epsilon fraternity (Omega Chi chapter). He received his bachelor's degree from UT in 1949. In 1952, he earned a master's degree in industrial engineering from the University of Houston.

== Playing career ==
Landry was selected in the 19th round (128th overall) of the 1948 AAFC Draft. He played one season in the All-America Football Conference for the New York Yankees, then moved in 1950 across town to the New York Giants.

Landry was also selected by the New York Giants in the 20th round (184th overall) of the 1947 NFL draft.

After the 1949 season, the AAFC folded, and the Yankees were not among the teams absorbed by the NFL. The New York Giants exercised their territorial rights and selected Landry in a dispersal draft. Under the guidance of Giants head coach Steve Owen, Landry got his first taste of coaching. Instead of explaining the 6–1–4 defense to the players, Owen called Landry up to the front, and asked him to explain the defense to his teammates. Landry got up, and explained what the defense would do to counter the offense, and this became Landry's first coaching experience. The 1953 season would be a season to forget, with the lowest point coming in a 62–10 loss at the hands of the Cleveland Browns. This loss would ultimately cost Coach Owen his job, and would again have Landry pondering his future. In 1954, he was selected as an All-Pro. He played through the 1955 season, and acted as a player-assistant coach the last two years, 1954 through 1955, under the guidance of new Giants head coach Jim Lee Howell. Landry ended his playing career with 32 interceptions in only 80 games, which he returned for 404 yards and three touchdowns. He also recovered 10 fumbles (seven defensive), returning them for 67 yards and two touchdowns.

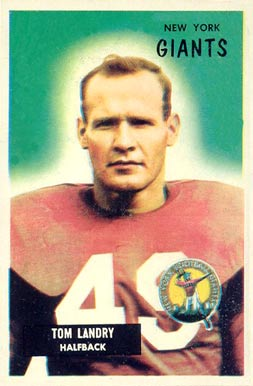
Landry on a 1955 Bowman football card

=== Career statistics ===
Led the NFL
Led the AAFC

=== Defense ===
Year	Team	Games		Interceptions					Fumbles			
Year	Team	GP	GS	Int	Yards	Avg	Lng	TD	Fmb	FR	Yds	TD
1949	NY Yankees	12	1	1	44	44	44	0	0	0	0	0
1950	NY Giants	12	12	2	0	0	0	0	0	2	41	1
1951	NY Giants	12	10	8	121	15.1	55	2	0	1	9	1
1952	NY Giants	12	11	8	99	12.4	30	1	5	3	3	0
1953	NY Giants	12	11	3	55	18.3	30	0	1	1	0	0
1954	NY Giants	12	12	8	71	8.9	27	0	1	2	14	0
1955	NY Giants	12	12	2	14	7	10	0	0	1	0	0
Career (1949–1955)		84	69	32	404	12.6	55	3	7	10	67	2
AAFC stats (1949)		12	1	1	44	44	44	0	0	0	0	0
NFL stats (1950–55)		72	68	31	360	11.6	55	3	7	10	67	2

=== Special teams ===
Year	Team	G	Punting					Kick returns				Punt returns			
Year	Team	G	Punts	Yards	Avg	Long	Block	KR	Yards	Avg	TD	PR	Yards	Avg	TD
1949	NY Yankees	12	51	2,249	44.1	–	2	2	39	19.5	0	3	52	17.3	0
1950	NY Giants	10	58	2,136	36.8	61	1	–	–	–	–	–	–	–	–
1951	NY Giants	12	15	638	42.5	59	0	1	0	0.0	0	1	0	0.0	0
1952	NY Giants	12	82	3,363	41.0	61	1	1	20	20.0	0	10	88	8.8	0
1953	NY Giants	12	44	1,772	40.3	60	0	2	38	19.0	0	1	5	5.0	0
1954	NY Giants	12	64	2,720	42.5	61	0	–	–	–	–	–	–	–	–
1955	NY Giants	12	75	3,022	40.3	69	1	–	–	–	–	–	–	–	–
Career (1949–1955)		82	389	15,900	40.9	69	5	6	97	16.2	0	15	145	9.7	0
AAFC stats (1949)		12	51	2,249	44.1	–	2	2	39	19.5	0	3	52	17.3	0
NFL stats (1950–55)		70	338	13,651	40.4	69	3	4	58	14.5	0	12	93	7.8	0

== Coaching career ==
For the 1954 football season, Landry became the defensive coordinator of the Giants, opposite Vince Lombardi, who was the offensive coordinator. Landry stayed on as a full-time defensive coordinator after his retirement, and led one of the best defensive units in the league from 1956 to 1959. The two coaches created a fanatical loyalty on a team that they coached to three appearances in the NFL championship game in four years. The Giants beat the Paddy Driscoll-led Chicago Bears 47–7 in 1956, but lost to the Baltimore Colts in 1958 and 1959.

In 1960, he became the first head coach of the Dallas Cowboys, a position he held for 29 seasons (1960–88). The Cowboys started with difficulties, recording an 0–11–1 record during their first season, with five or fewer wins in each of their next four. Despite this early futility, in 1964, Landry was given a 10-year extension by owner Clint Murchison Jr. It would prove to be a wise move, as Landry's hard work and determination paid off, and the Cowboys improved to a 7–7 record in 1965. In 1966, they surprised the NFL by posting 10 wins and making it all the way to the NFL Championship game. Dallas lost the game to Lombardi's Green Bay Packers, but this season was but a modest display of what lay ahead. In 1967, the Cowboys lost again to Lombardi's Packers, this time by a score of 21-17 in a game which took place on a cold, wintry day in Green Bay.

=== The Great Innovator ===
Landry developed the now-popular "4–3 defense" while serving as Giants defensive coordinator. It was called "4–3" because it featured four down linemen (two ends and two defensive tackles on either side of the offensive center) and three linebackers – middle, left, and right. The innovation was the middle linebacker. Previously, a lineman was placed directly over the center. Landry had this person stand up and move back two yards. The Giants' middle linebacker was the legendary Sam Huff.

Landry built the 4–3 defense around me. It revolutionized defense and opened the door for all the variations of zones and man-to-man coverage, which are used in conjunction with it today. —Sam Huff

When he came to Dallas, Landry refined the 4–3 even further, specifically to counter Lombardi's "run to daylight" strategy. Lombardi's offense was built around sending the running back through any open space, rather than a specific assigned hole. Landry reasoned that the best counter was a defense that flowed to possible daylight and blotted it out. The result was the "Flex Defense," which assigned the defenders specific areas of the field to cover. When Landry first implemented it in 1964, fans were initially mystified when they saw the Cowboys defense not swarming to the ball. However, the skeptics were won over when ball carriers invariably ran right into the arms of one of Landry's defenders. The Flex Defense worked so well that Landry had to create an offense to score on it, one which disguised an otherwise simple play with multiple formations.

Landry did not always search inside the traditional college football pipeline for talent. For example, he recruited several soccer players from Latin America, such as Efren Herrera and Rafael Septién, to compete for the job of placekicker for the Cowboys. Landry looked to the world of track and field for speedy skill-position players. For example, Bob Hayes, once considered the fastest man in the world, was drafted by and played wide receiver for the Cowboys under Landry.

Landry produced a very large coaching tree. In 1986, five NFL head coaches were former Landry assistants: Mike Ditka, Dan Reeves, John Mackovic, Gene Stallings, and Raymond Berry.

=== Coaching in the Super Bowl ===
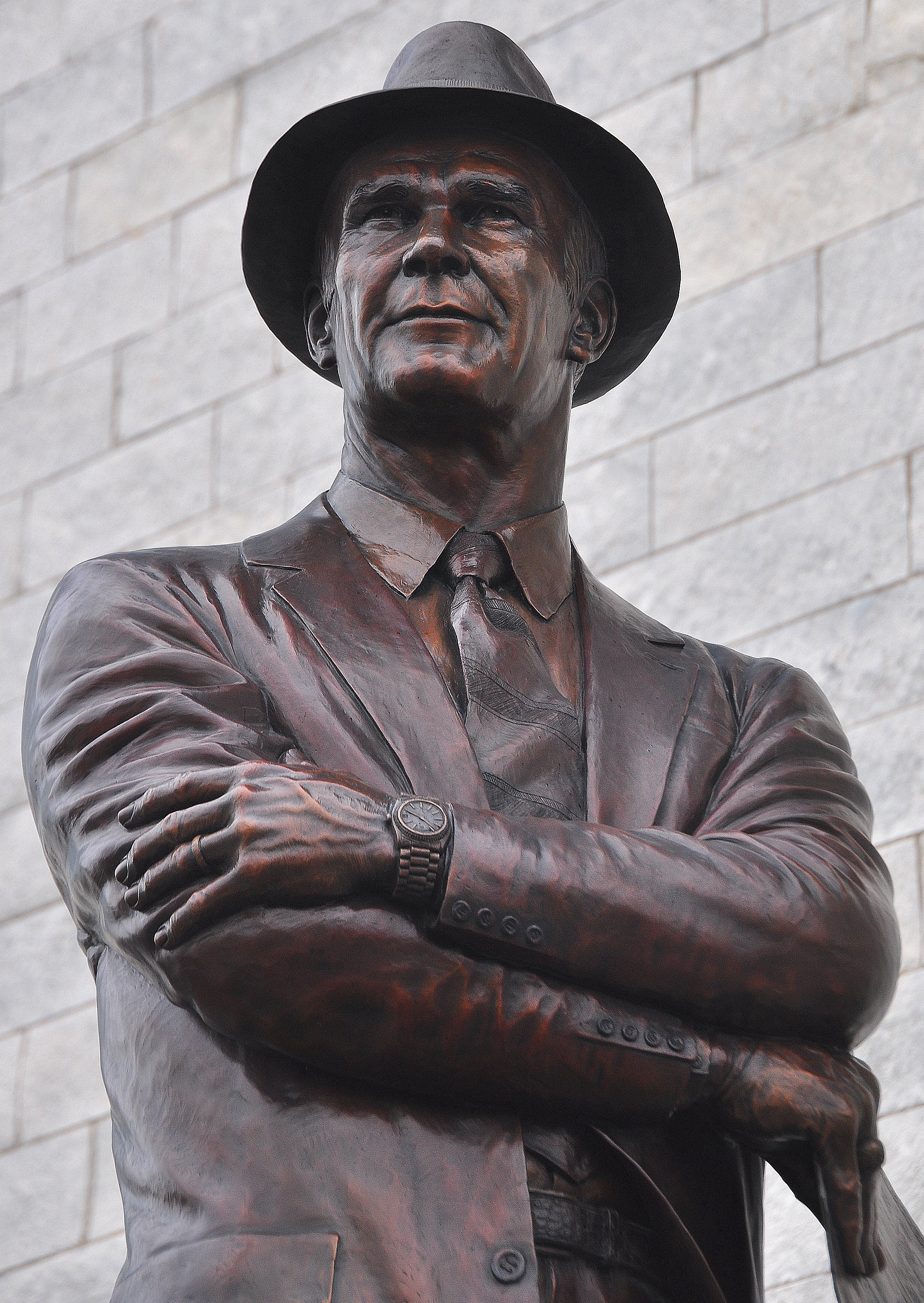
Statue of Landry outside of AT&T Stadium

While Landry's Cowboys are known for their two Super Bowls against Chuck Noll and the Pittsburgh Steelers, Landry also led Dallas to three other Super Bowls. Landry was 2–3 in the Super Bowl, winning both in New Orleans and losing all three at the Miami Orange Bowl.

Landry coached the Cowboys to their first Super Bowl win in Super Bowl VI, defeating the Miami Dolphins 24–3, holding the Dolphins to a single field goal. This win came a year after the Cowboys lost Super Bowl V to the Baltimore Colts. The Cowboys lost Super Bowl X, their first battle with the Pittsburgh Steelers, in a game that is heralded as a classic. The rematch in Super Bowl XIII would be just as good, with the Cowboys being a Jackie Smith catch away from tying the Steelers and keeping pace early in the third quarter; instead, Pittsburgh scored twice in succession and put the game away. Before the Super Bowl XIII rematch, Cowboys linebacker Thomas "Hollywood" Henderson famously stated, "Terry Bradshaw couldn't spell c-a-t if you spotted him the C and the T." Landry recalled in his autobiography how he cringed when he heard that, because he did not feel that Bradshaw needed additional motivation in a big game like the Super Bowl.

=== Dismissal and legacy ===
During the 1980s, the Cowboys won two division championships, made five playoff appearances, and reached the NFC Championship Game in three consecutive seasons (1980–1982). However, they failed to reach the Super Bowl during the decade. The team's 1982 NFC Championship Game loss was Landry's final conference championship game appearance; the preceding week's win was his final playoff victory.

In 1984, Dallas businessman Bum Bright bought the team from Murchison. As the Cowboys suffered through progressively poorer seasons (their record falling from 10–6 in 1985 to 7–9 in 1986, 7–8 in 1987, and 3–13 in 1988), Bright became disenchanted with the team. Landry's game strategies and single-mindedness during these seasons left him open to public criticism.

Landry signed a three-year contract in the summer of 1987. However, general manager Tex Schramm brought in Paul Hackett as a new offensive coach in 1986, and in 1987, he hired offensive line coach Jim Erkenbeck and special-teams coach Mike Solari. Some suggested that Schramm's moves divided the coaching staff, a plan to first undermine and then dismiss Landry. Bright, who usually stayed behind the scenes, publicly criticized Landry after a home loss to the Atlanta Falcons in 1987, saying that he was "horrified" at the play-calling and complaining, "It doesn't seem like we've got anybody in charge who knows what he's doing, other than Tex." Bright's belief that former first-round draft picks Danny Noonan and Herschel Walker were not being used enough further put him at odds with the coaching staff. On the day after the Cowboys lost to the Detroit Lions, a team that had entered the game tied for the worst record in the NFL, Schramm said on his radio show, "There's an old saying, 'If the teacher doesn't teach, the student doesn't learn.'" Nonetheless, Bright maintained his hands-off approach on the team while Schramm retained his confidence in Landry.

Landry's Cowboys finished the 1988 season 3–13, the worst record in the league. His record as head coach fell to 270–178–6. It was the Cowboys' third consecutive losing season and the fourth time in five years that they had missed the playoffs. Nonetheless, Landry felt confident he could correct the mistakes he had been making in recent years. In February 1989, before the start of the 1989 season, as he dismissed or reassigned his assistants, he remained determined to coach into the 1990s "unless I get fired." Landry had one year left on his contract, which paid $1 million per season.

Meanwhile, Bright had suffered major losses in his banking, real estate, and oil businesses; during the savings and loan crisis, Bright's Savings and Loan was taken over by the FSLIC. With most of the rest of his fortune tied up in the Cowboys, Bright was forced to put the team up for sale. Bright ultimately sold the team to Jerry Jones, who fired Landry on February 25, 1989, one day after closing on the purchase. Jones hired Jimmy Johnson, his former teammate at the University of Arkansas, who had been serving as head coach for the Miami Hurricanes. Schramm was in tears at the press conference that announced the coaching change; he was forced out as general manager shortly afterwards. Schramm and Landry had been together for 29 years, each being the only person to serve in their respective position since the Cowboys' inception in 1960. When Landry met with his players two days later to tell them how much he would miss them, he began to cry, and the players responded with a standing ovation. He had spent 40 consecutive years at field level in the AAFC and NFL: five as a player (1949–1953), two as a player-assistant coach (1954–1955), four as an assistant coach (1956–1959), and 29 as a head coach.

Jones received immediate backlash for his decision to fire Landry, while the former coach received an outpouring of public support. Despite Landry's recent poor performance, Cowboys fans felt disillusioned that the only coach in the team's history had been removed so unceremoniously. NFL commissioner Pete Rozelle compared the firing to the death of former Green Bay Packers coach Vince Lombardi. President George H.W. Bush, who had previously represented Texas in the House of Representatives, called Landry "an inspiration to all who ever watched or played the game of football."

Jones stated he never considered retaining Landry and that he would not have purchased the team unless he could hire Johnson as coach. In 1990, Bright said that he regretted the backlash that Jones had faced for firing Landry. Bright recounted that he had been willing to fire Landry himself as early as 1987, but that Schramm had told him that there was no suitable replacement who was ready to assume the job. By 1993, relations between Jones and Landry had improved, and Landry was inducted into the Ring of Honor at Texas Stadium.

Landry's last work in professional football was as a limited partner of the San Antonio Riders of the World League of American Football in 1992.

== Head coaching record ==
Team	Year	Regular season					Postseason			
Team	Year	Won	Lost	Ties	Win %	Finish	Won	Lost	Win %	Result
DAL	1960	0	11	1	.042	7th in NFL West	—	—	—	—
DAL	1961	4	9	1	.321	6th in NFL East	—	—	—	—
DAL	1962	5	8	1	.393	5th in NFL East	—	—	—	—
DAL	1963	4	10	0	.286	5th in NFL East	—	—	—	—
DAL	1964	5	8	1	.393	5th in NFL East	—	—	—	—
DAL	1965	7	7	0	.500	2nd in NFL East	—	—	—	—
DAL	1966	10	3	1	.750	1st in NFL East	0	1	.000	Lost to Green Bay Packers in NFL Championship Game
DAL	1967	9	5	0	.643	1st in NFL Capitol	1	1	.500	Lost to Green Bay Packers in NFL Championship Game
DAL	1968	12	2	0	.857	1st in NFL Capitol	0	1	.000	Lost to Cleveland Browns in Eastern Conference Championship Game
DAL	1969	11	2	1	.821	1st in NFL Capitol	0	1	.000	Lost to Cleveland Browns in Eastern Conference Championship Game
DAL	1970	10	4	0	.714	1st in NFC East	2	1	.667	Lost to Baltimore Colts in Super Bowl V
DAL	1971	11	3	0	.786	1st in NFC East	3	0	1.000	Super Bowl VI champions
DAL	1972	10	4	0	.714	2nd in NFC East	1	1	.500	Lost to Washington Redskins in NFC Championship Game
DAL	1973	10	4	0	.714	1st in NFC East	1	1	.500	Lost to Minnesota Vikings in NFC Championship Game
DAL	1974	8	6	0	.571	3rd in NFC East	—	—	—	—
DAL	1975	10	4	0	.714	2nd in NFC East	2	1	.667	Lost to Pittsburgh Steelers in Super Bowl X
DAL	1976	11	3	0	.786	1st in NFC East	0	1	.000	Lost to Los Angeles Rams in NFC Divisional Game
DAL	1977	12	2	0	.857	1st in NFC East	3	0	1.000	Super Bowl XII champions
DAL	1978	12	4	0	.750	1st in NFC East	2	1	.667	Lost to Pittsburgh Steelers in Super Bowl XIII
DAL	1979	11	5	0	.688	1st in NFC East	0	1	.000	Lost to Los Angeles Rams in NFC Divisional Game
DAL	1980	12	4	0	.750	2nd in NFC East	2	1	.667	Lost to Philadelphia Eagles in NFC Championship Game
DAL	1981	12	4	0	.750	1st in NFC East	1	1	.500	Lost to San Francisco 49ers in NFC Championship Game
DAL	1982	6	3	0	.667	2nd in NFC	2	1	.667	Lost to Washington Redskins in NFC Championship Game
DAL	1983	12	4	0	.750	2nd in NFC East	0	1	.000	Lost to Los Angeles Rams in NFC Wild Card Game
DAL	1984	9	7	0	.563	4th in NFC East	—	—	—	—
DAL	1985	10	6	0	.667	1st in NFC East	0	1	.000	Lost to Los Angeles Rams in NFC Divisional Game
DAL	1986	7	9	0	.438	3rd in NFC East	—	—	—	—
DAL	1987	7	8	0	.467	2nd in NFC East	—	—	—	—
DAL	1988	3	13	0	.188	5th in NFC East	—	—	—	—
Total		250	162	6	.605		20	16	.556	

== In popular culture ==
- On December 24, 1959, while defensive coach of the Giants, Landry pretended to be Catholic missionary Father William A. Lightning on the panel game To Tell The Truth.
- The Machiavellian coach in Peter Gent's novel North Dallas Forty is based on Tom Landry. G.D. Spradlin played the role in the film of the same name.
- In the animated sitcom King of the Hill, the middle school in Arlen is named "Tom Landry Middle School", and Landry is a personal hero of the show's main character Hank Hill. He mentions being "mortified" because he went to work on the date of Landry's death after his cousin Dusty (guest star Dusty Hill of ZZ Top) had previously tricked him into thinking Landry had died, and he thought it was a repeat of that prank. Hank also has a Tom Landry ceramic plate that he sometimes consults in times of need, on one occasion saying, "Where did I go wrong, Tom?" Landry also occasionally appears to Hank in dream sequences to counsel him in times of need, such as during Hank's varnish-induced hallucination in the episode "Hillennium" and in "Trans-Fascism", when he tells Hank the consequences of breaking the law.
- In an episode of The Simpsons ("You Only Move Twice"), Homer Simpson buys Landry's trademark fedora in an effort to improve his leadership qualities, and is shown in several later episodes wearing the hat. Landry is also featured in the season 7 episode "Marge Be Not Proud" as one of the Christmas carolers introduced by Krusty the Clown early in the episode.
- In a Campbell's Chunky Soup commercial, the game takes place in a fictional Reginald H. White Memorial Park, on the corner of Landry Road and Halas Drive.

== Awards and honors ==
- 1966: National Football League Coach of the Year Award
- 1978: Recipient of the Golden Plate Award of the American Academy of Achievement
- 1989: Honored by the city of Dallas
- 1990: Inducted into Pro Football Hall of Fame
- 1991: Inducted into National High School Hall of Fame
- 1993: Inducted into Dallas Cowboys' Ring of Honor

== Personal life ==
Landry married Alicia Wiggs on January 28, 1949. They had a son and two daughters. He was a Christian, attending Highland Park Methodist Church, at times even giving sermons there. On January 22, 2021, the Dallas Cowboys announced that Alicia had died the previous day at the age of 91.

When coaching on the sidelines Landry always wore a suit and tie with his trademark fedora.

== Death ==
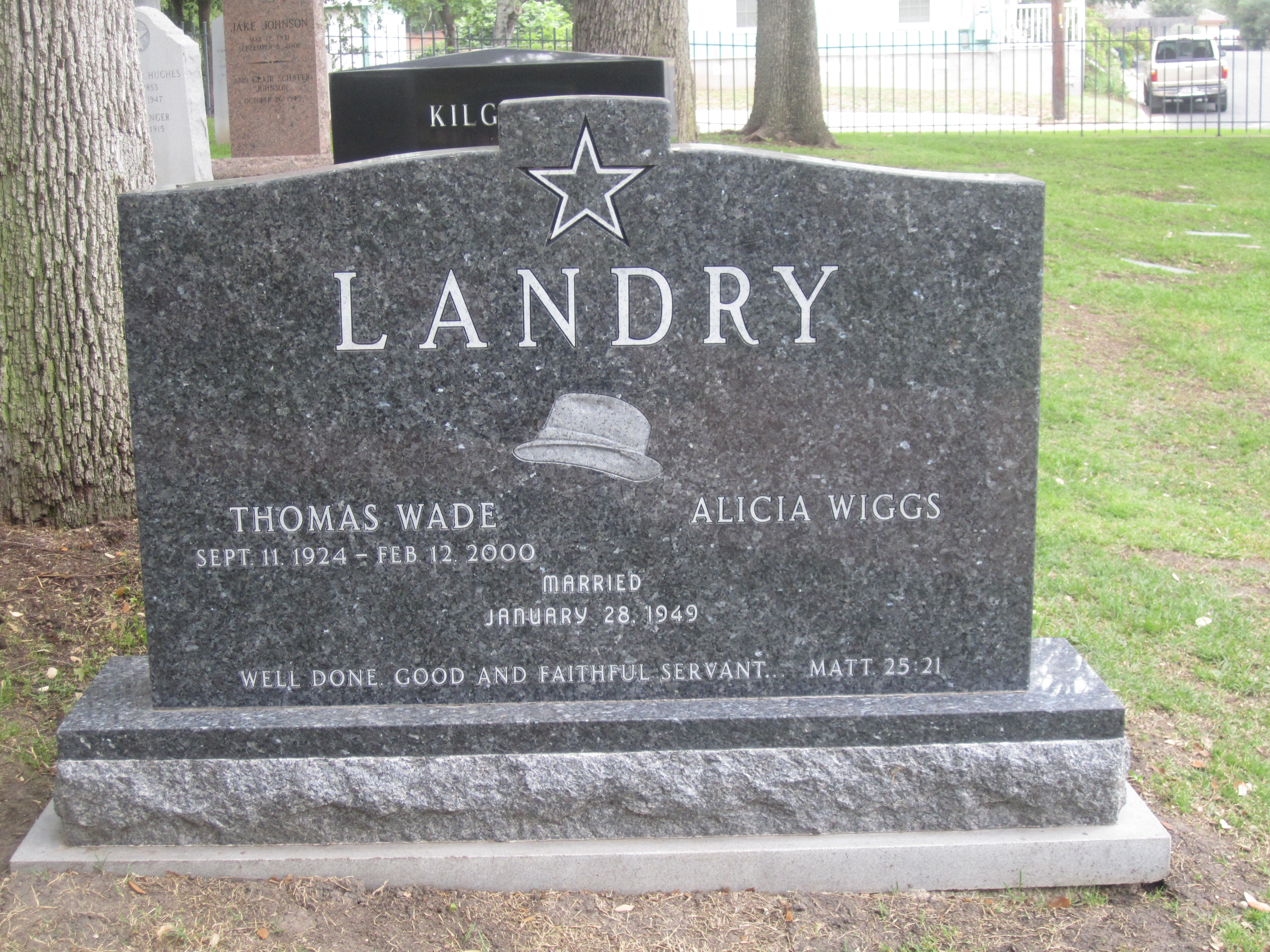
Landry's cenotaph at Texas State Cemetery

Landry was diagnosed with leukemia in May 1999. He died nine months later on February 12, 2000, at the age of 75.

Landry's funeral service was held at Highland Park United Methodist Church, where he was an active and committed member for 43 years. He was interred in the Sparkman-Hillcrest Memorial Park Cemetery in Dallas. A cenotaph dedicated to Landry, complete with a depiction of his fedora, was placed in the official Texas State Cemetery in Austin at the family's request.

The Cowboys wore a patch on their uniforms during the 2000 season depicting Landry's trademark fedora. A bronze statue of Landry stood outside of Texas Stadium, and now stands in front of AT&T Stadium since the Cowboys relocated in 2009. The section of Interstate 30 between Dallas and Fort Worth was named the Tom Landry Highway by the Texas Legislature in 2001. The football stadium in Landry's hometown of Mission, Texas, was named Tom Landry Stadium to honor one of the city's most famous former residents. Similarly, Trinity Christian Academy's stadium in Addison, Texas, is named Tom Landry Stadium in honor of Landry's extensive involvement and support of the school. An elementary school in the Carrollton-Farmers Branch Independent School district, very near the Cowboys former training facility in Valley Ranch, is also named in honor of Landry. The Tom Landry Welcome Center at Dallas Baptist University, where he was a frequent chapel speaker and award recipient, was posthumously dedicated to him in 2002.

In 2013, a major new biography of Landry was published, entitled The Last Cowboy.

== See also ==
- List of National Football League head coaches with 50 wins
- List of National Football League head coaches with 200 wins

== Bibliography ==
- Cavanaugh, Jack (2008). Giants Among Men. New York: Random House. ISBN 978-1-58836-697-9.
