= Stanley P. Friedman =

American author and photographer

- Born: February 3, 1925
- Died: July 14, 2006 (aged 81)
- Occupation: Journalist
- Children: Josh Max (journalist)
- Military career
- Allegiance: United States
- Branch: United States Army
- Rank: 2nd Lieutenant
- Units: 861st Bomb Squadron, 493d Bombardment Group, 3rd Bomb Division, Eighth Air Force
- Conflicts: WWII, Europe
- Awards: Air Medal, silver cluster

Stanley Philip Friedman (February 3, 1925 – July 14, 2006) was an American author and photographer based in New York City, and a bombardier in the 8th Air Corps from 1943 to 1945.

Friedman published numerous articles in such magazines and newspapers as Cavalier, Esquire, New York Magazine, The New York Times and the Village Voice on such subjects as Jackson Pollock, sharing his name with other notable Stanley Friedmans, spotting a UFO in Westchester County (an event also covered by local media as dozens of other witnesses had seen it) and photographers who cover crime in NYC on the overnight shift. He was the author of "The Magnificent Kennedy Women" (1964) "The Kennedy Family Scrapbook" (1978) and "Ronald Reagan - His Life Story in Pictures". (1986) He was also the co-author, with television news reporter Robert McNeil on "The Way We Were: 1963, The Year Kennedy Was Shot."

== World War II ==
Friedman was born in Seattle and attended Garfield High School. He enlisted in the US Army Air Corps during World War II, as a 2nd Lieutenant. He became a bombardier, first of B-24, and then B-17, aircraft, and flew 36 missions over Belgium, France, Holland, and Germany in the 861st Bomb Squadron, 493d Bombardment Group, 3rd Bomb Division, Eighth Air Force.

After his tour in the European Theater of Operations, he gained his commission and trained to become a pilot. He was released from the Air Corps at the convenience of the Army on 17 October 1945, after the war's end. For his service in operations over Normandy, the Rhineland, and the Ardennes, he received the Air Medal with one silver cluster.

== Photography ==
After the war, Friedman took a degree in English Literature from the University of Washington. He then moved to New York City, where he began shooting hundreds of photos in his spare time. He also worked in the photo department of United Press International from 1960 to 1981. Many of the prints appeared in prominent newspapers, including a widely circulated photo showing Friedman's wife Jean and his small son Nick expressing surprise at a seemingly broken water fountain's suddenly springing to life. Another photo, one of Henry Cabot Lodge Jr., former U.S. Ambassador to the United Nations, and his wife on a bench in Central Park, appeared on the front page of the New York Herald Tribune.

== Writing ==
After an incident where Friedman, attempting a nature shot while perched precariously on a log over a stream, fell and doused himself and his camera, he focused his efforts primarily on writing. He wrote four books: The Magnificent Kennedy Women, Ronald Reagan: His Life Story in Pictures, The Kennedy Family Scrapbook, and under the pseudonym Ike Macgillicuddy, True Quotes. Friedman was also photo editor of Robert MacNeil's book, The Way We Were: 1963, The Year Kennedy Was Shot.

Friedman wrote articles freelance for The New York Times, New York, Esquire, National Lampoon, and the Village Voice. He conceived of a layout for a 1981 Esquire article "Got the Picture?", which went on to win a national design award. It consisted of a two-page spread containing empty rectangles where photos might logically appear, under which captions written by Friedman described famous events in modern history that were so prominent in the public mind that many swore they had seen the photographs, though none existed. Among them: Nikita Khrushchev using his shoe as a gavel on the dais during a U.N. speech and Babe Ruth pointing to center field in the 1932 World Series prior to hitting a home run there.

== Death ==
Friedman vowed to pursue his writing career "until they find me dead at the keyboard." True to his word, his end came just a few feet away from his computer, in his sleep, on July 14, 2006. The screen contained a poem Friedman was composing.

He was buried, as per his wishes, with a cup of coffee and a New York Times in his coffin. His epitaph: "Fifty Years on the Writer's Rock Pile."

== Works ==
- Friedman, Stanley P. (1964), The Magnificent Kennedy Women, Monarch Books
- Friedman, Stanley P.; Kligman, Ruth (1973), Loopholes in "Blue Poles", NYM Corporation, OCLC 922648057, "originally published as an article", New York, vol. 6, no. 44, October 29, 1973, ISSN 0028-7369
- Friedman, Stanley P. (May 2, 1977), "Camera Rascals", New York, vol. 10, no. 18, p. 42, ISSN 0028-7369
- Friedman, Stanley P. (1978), The Kennedy Family Scrapbook, Grosset & Dunlap, ISBN 978-0448148359
- Friedman, Stanley P.; as Ike Macgillicuddy (1980), True quotes, Dell, ISBN 978-0440586340
- Friedman, Stanley P. (1986), Ronald Reagan, His Life Story in Pictures: His Life Story in Pictures, Dodd Mead, ISBN 978-0-396-08827-1
