= 962nd Airborne Air Control Squadron =

962d Airborne Air Control Squadron (962 AACS)

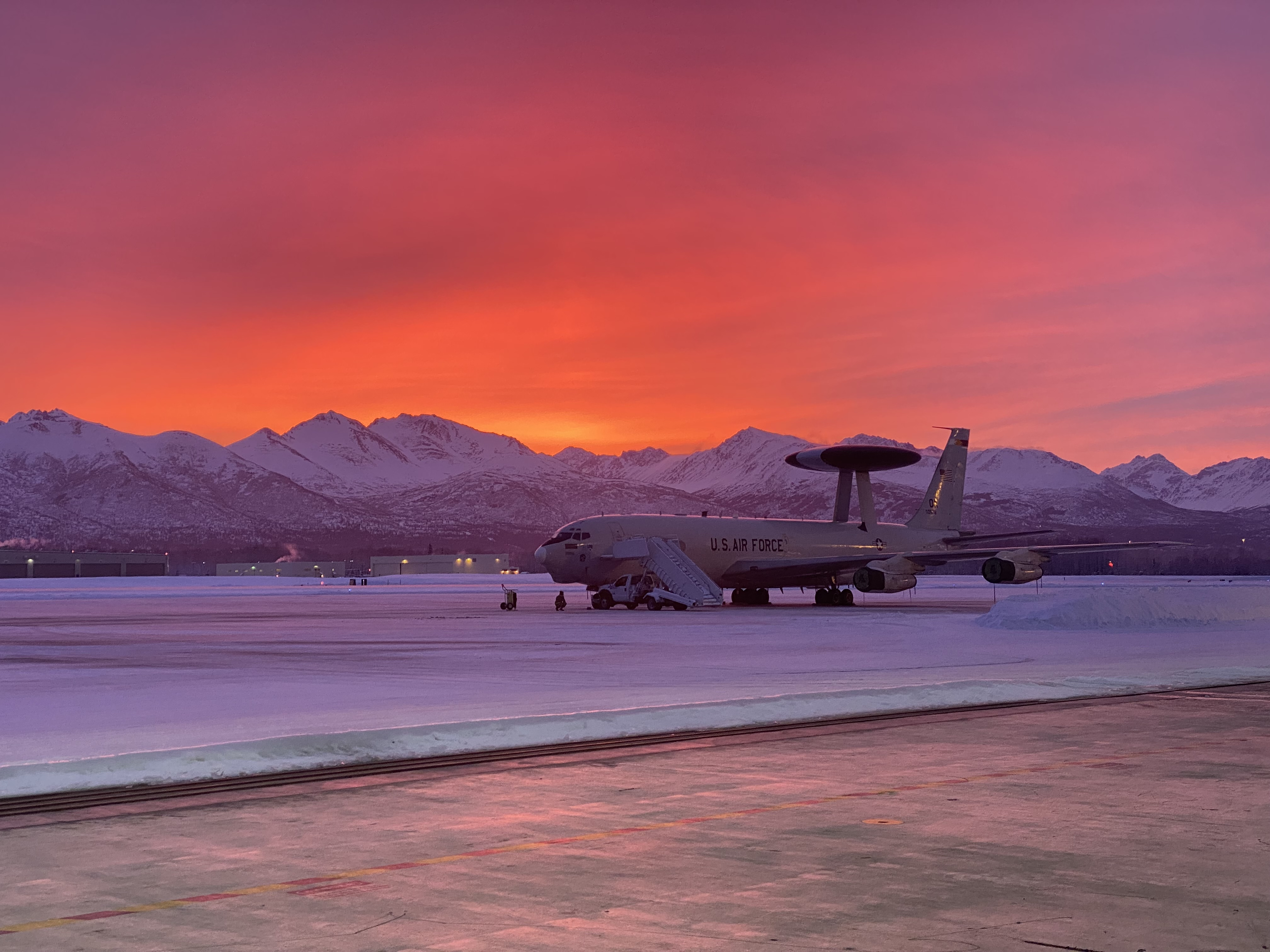
- Squadron E-3G Sentry (AWACS) aircraft on the ramp at Elmendorf
- Active: 1943–1945; 1955–1969; 1986–present
- Country: United States
- Branch: United States Air Force
- Role: Airborne Battle Management Command and Control
- Part of: Pacific Air Forces
- Garrison/HQ: Joint Base Elmendorf-Richardson
- Motto: Eyes of the Eagle
- Anniversaries: 22 September (YUKLA 27 crash)
- Engagements: European Theater of Operations
- Decorations: Air Force Outstanding Unit Award

Commanders
- Current commander: Lt Col David Shaffer
- Notable commanders: Lt Col Jared Lemmons (2024-2026); Lt Col Clint Hammer (2022-2024); Lt Col Pamela Boyarski (2020-2022); Lt Col James Stone (2018-2020); Lt Col Michelle Shicks (2016-2018); Lt Col Eric Gonzalez (2014-2016); Lt Col Michael Erickson (2012-2014); Lt Col Michael Mote (2010-2012); Lt Col Michael Homola (2008-2010); Lt Col Russel Armstrong (2006-2008); Lt Col Roger Brown (2004-2006); Lt Col Mark Nakanishi (2002-2004); Lt Col Cristof Cordes (2001-2002); Lt Col James Eisenhart (1999-2001); Lt Col William Macbeth (1997-1999); Lt Col William Carter (1995-1997); Lt Col John Newsom (1994-1995); Lt Col Richard Strom (1992-1994); Lt Col Sammy Todd (1990-1992); Lt Col Thomas Toops (1988-1990); Lt Col Joseph Moynihan (1986-1988)

Insignia
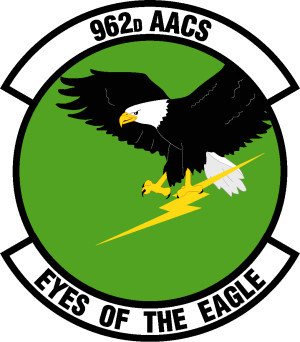
- 962d Airborne Air Control Squadron emblem (Note: Approved 23 October 1995.)

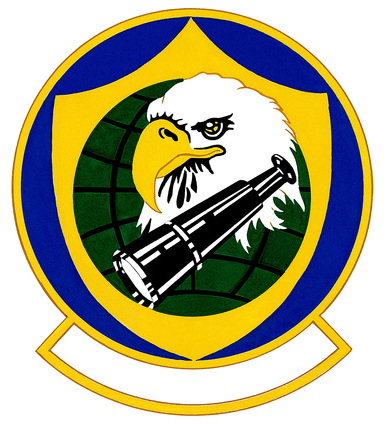
- 962d Airborne Warning & Control Sq emblem (Note: Approved 6 August 1986.)

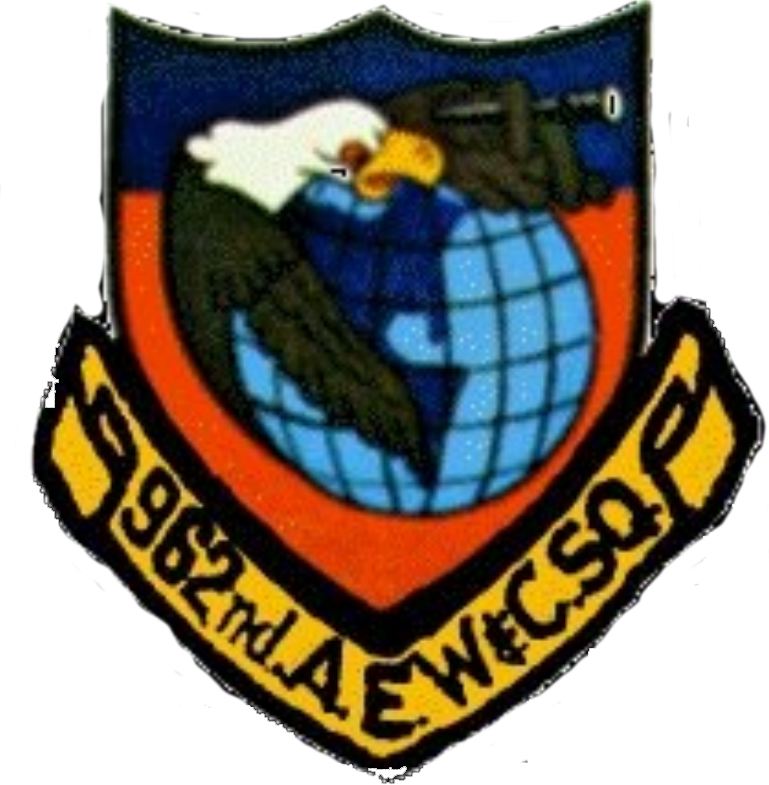
- Patch with 962d Airborne Early Warning and Control Squadron emblem (Note: Approved 14 February 1957.)
- Squadron fuselage code (World War II) (Note: The 493d Group used single letter squadron codes, unlike other Eighth Air Force units, which used two letter codes. Watkins, p. 122.): C

The 962d Airborne Air Control Squadron is part of the 3rd Wing at Joint Base Elmendorf-Richardson, Alaska. It operates the Boeing E-3G Sentry aircraft conducting airborne battle management command and control missions. The squadron's first predecessor was the 862d Bombardment Squadron, a heavy bomber unit that saw combat during World War II in the European Theater of Operations, where it participated in the strategic bombing campaign against Germany. Toward the end of the war, the squadron operated fighter aircraft, acting as a scouting force for bomber formations. After V-E Day, the squadron returned the United States and was inactivated.

The second predecessor of the squadron was activated at Otis Air Force Base, Massachusetts as the 962d Airborne Early Warning and Control Squadron in 1955. It performed surveillance and warning missions off the Atlantic coast until inactivating in 1969. The two squadrons were consolidated into a single unit in 1985. The consolidated squadron was activated in Alaska the following year and has provided surveillance, detection and control of airpower since then.

== Mission ==
The 962d Airborne Air Control Squadron provides United States Indo-Pacific Command with long-range airborne surveillance, detection, identification, and command and control capabilities for both regional and deployed operations. It also supports North American Aerospace Defense Command's air defense of its Alaska NORAD Region.

== History ==
=== World War II ===
==== Initial activation and training in the United States ====
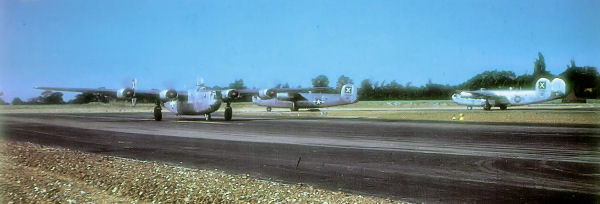
B-24s of the 493d Bomb Group at Debach

The squadron's first predecessor, the 862d Bombardment Squadron, was first activated at McCook Army Air Field, Nebraska as one of the original four squadrons of the 493d Bombardment Group. The formation of the squadron was delayed by an administrative error that caused some of the unit's cadre to report to Davis-Monthan Field, Arizona instead of McCook. It was not until January 1944 that all personnel were at McCook. By this time, the squadron had transferred on paper to Elveden Hall, England. The ground personnel of the squadron in the United States had been used to form Boeing B-29 Superfortress units being activated by Second Air Force, while the air echelon remained in Nebraska to conduct training on their assigned Consolidated B-24 Liberators. Meanwhile, Eighth Air Force formed a new ground echelon for the squadron in England from other units assigned to the 3d Bombardment Division. This ground echelon moved to the squadron's combat station, RAF Debach, in April 1944. The squadron's air echelon departed for England via the northern ferry route on 1 May, while a small ground component left McCook and sailed from Boston, Massachusetts on the SS Brazil on 12 May 1944.

==== Combat in Europe ====
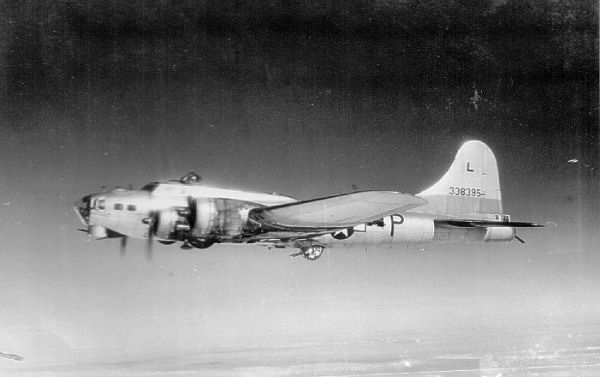
493d Bomb Group B-17 (Note: Aircraft is Boeing B-17G-85-BO Flying Fortress, serial 43-38395, fuselage code P-L, Taylor Made with the 863d Bombardment Squadron. This plane was transferred to the 862d in 1945 and given fuselage code C-F. This plane survived the war and was stored at Kingman Army Air Field until it was scrapped in July 1946. Baugher, Joe (14 May 2023). "1943 USAF Serial Numbers". Joe Baugher.)

The squadron flew its first combat mission on D-Day, 6 June 1944. It continued to fly Liberators until 24 August 1944, when it was withdrawn from combat to convert to Boeing B-17 Flying Fortresses, along with other units of the 93d Bombardment Wing, as Eighth Air Force concentrated all its Liberators in the 2d Bombardment Division. It resumed combat missions with the B-17 on 8 September 1944. The squadron concentrated its attacks on military and industrial targets in Germany, attacking an ordnance depot in Magdeburg, factories near Frankfurt, and a synthetic oil manufacturing plant at Merseburg. It also attacked lines of communications, including a railroad tunnel at Ahrweiler, bridges at Irlich, and marshalling yards near Cologne.

The squadron was occasionally diverted from the strategic bombing campaign to attack tactical targets. It supported Operation Overlord, the Normandy invasion, striking artillery batteries, airfields and bridges. It struck enemy ground forces south of Caen and during Operation Cobra, the breakout at St Lo. It bombed German fortifications to support Operation Market Garden, airborne attacks attempting to secure a bridgehead across the Rhine in the Netherlands and attacked communications during the Battle of the Bulge. Toward the end of the war, it also supported Operation Varsity, the airborne assault across the Rhine in Germany.

On 1 February 1945, the squadron designation replaced the 3d Scouting Force and moved to RAF Wormingford, while the squadron's personnel were distributed among the other squadrons of the 493d Group. The scouting forces had been established in each division of VIII Bomber Command to precede bomber formations and warn of adverse weather or enemy opposition. The force was equipped with North American P-51 Mustangs flown by experienced bomber pilots, while wingmen were fighter pilots. After hostilities and the need for a scouting force ended, the squadron was reformed at Debach in the 493d Group in May. The squadron flew food-dropping missions in early May. The squadron air echelon departed Debach on 30 June, while the ground echelon sailed for home aboard the RMS Queen Elizabeth on 6 August 1945. In late August, the squadron assembled at Sioux Falls Army Air Field, South Dakota, where it was inactivated on 28 August 1945.

=== Airborne warning and control ===
==== Air Defense of the Atlantic coast ====
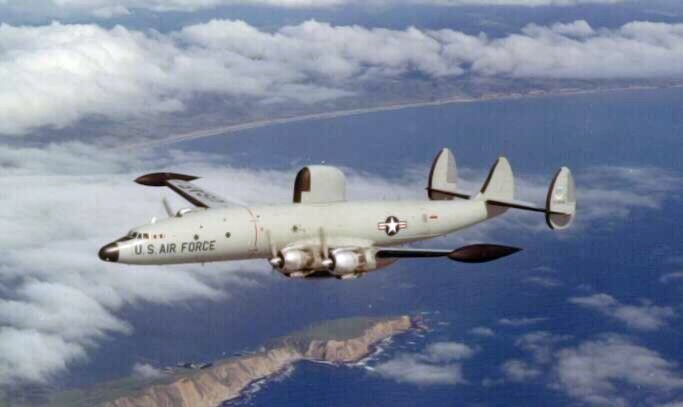
Lockheed EC-121D

The second predecessor of the unit, the 962d Airborne Early Warning and Control Squadron, was activated at Otis Air Force Base, Massachusetts on 8 July 1955. The squadron's primary tactical aircraft was the Lockheed EC-121 Warning Star, although it flew other models of the Constellation as well. At Otis, it was assigned to the 551st Airborne Early Warning and Control Wing of Air Defense Command (ADC). The squadron mission was to extend ADC's early warning system radar coverage seaward beyond that provided by ADC's land radars. The unit also provided navigation and communications assistance to U.S. and allied aircraft crossing the Atlantic Ocean and conducted search and rescue operations. The 962d was inactivated on 31 December 1969.

==== Alaskan operations ====
The 962d was consolidated with the 862d Bombardment Squadron as the 962d Airborne Warning and Control Squadron while inactive in 1985. The consolidated unit was activated on 8 July 1986, at Elmendorf Air Force Base. The 962d was assigned to the 28th Air Division at Tinker Air Force Base, Oklahoma, which controlled all Boeing E-3 Sentry aircraft. The mission of the 962d was to provide the Eleventh Air Force commander (who also commanded the Alaska NORAD Region) with a survivable radar platform to extend the surveillance coverage of land-based radars operated by the Alaskan Regional Operational Control Center. The squadron's airborne radars could detect threats at ranges outside the ground-based radar coverage areas to position interceptors to intercept them before they enter U.S. airspace. Between 1986 and 2007, the squadron assisted in the interception of 68 Soviet Air Force aircraft.

In May 1992, the 28th Air Division was inactivated and the squadron was briefly assigned to the 552d Operations Group. This assignment was brief, since the Air Force had decided that units on a base should all be assigned to one wing under what was named the Objective Wing organization. In October 1992, the squadron was reassigned to the 3rd Operations Group of Elmendorf's host 3rd Wing at Elmendorf. It also acquired the mission of being ready to deploy in support of United States Pacific Command. In August 1994, the 962d was redesignated the 962d Airborne Air Control Squadron.

On 22 September 1995, the squadron experienced its worst single accident. Aircraft YUKLA 27 rolled for takeoff at 0746 Alaska Standard Time, remaining airborne only 42 seconds due to a massive birdstrike resulting in catastrophic engine damage. The crash resulted in the deaths of 22 U.S. Air Force and two Royal Canadian Air Force personnel. Today, squadron aircrews take part in exercises such as RED FLAG-ALASKA, NORTHERN EDGE, COPE NORTH, and TALISMAN SABRE to remain prepared for contingency operations in the Pacific, while also maintaining a continuous alert presence for the homeland defense mission.

== Lineage ==
862d Bombardment Squadron

- Constituted as the 862d Bombardment Squadron (Heavy) on 14 September 1943

Activated on 1 November 1943
Redesignated 862d Bombardment Squadron, Heavy on 21 February 1944
Inactivated on 28 Aug 1945

- Consolidated with the 962d Airborne Warning and Control Support Squadron as the 962d Airborne Warning and Control Squadron on 19 September 1985

962d Airborne Air Control Squadron

- Constituted as the 962d Airborne Early Warning and Control Squadron on 30 March 1955

Activated on 8 July 1955
Inactivated on 31 December 1969

- Redesignated 962d Airborne Warning and Control Support Squadron on 31 July 1979
- Consolidated with the 862d Bombardment Squadron as the 962d Airborne Warning and Control Squadron on 19 September 1985

Activated on 1 July 1986
Redesignated 962d Airborne Air Control Squadron on 1 August 1994

=== Assignments ===
- 493d Bombardment Group, 1 November 1943 – 28 August 1945 (attached to 3rd Air Division, 17 February–7 May 1945)
- 551st Airborne Early Warning and Control Wing, 8 July 1955 – 31 December 1969
- 28th Air Division, 1 July 1986
- 552d Operations Group, 29 May 1992
- 3d Operations Group, 1 May 1993 – present

=== Stations ===
- McCook Army Air Field, Nebraska, 1 November 1943 – 1 January 1944
- Elveden Hall (Station 116), (Note: Elveden Hall was a manor, not an airfield. It was also known as Camp Blainey. Anderson, pp. 9, 12.) England, 1 January 1944
- RAF Debach (Station 152), England, 17 April 1944
- RAF Wormingford (Station 159), England, 17 February 1945
- RAF Debach (Station 152), England, 18 May–6 August 1945
- Sioux Falls Army Air Field, South Dakota, c. 13–28 Aug 1945
- Otis Air Force Base, Massachusetts, 8 July 1955 – 31 December 1969
- Elmendorf Air Force Base, Alaska, 1 July 1986 – present

=== Aircraft ===
- Consolidated B-24 Liberator (1944)
- Boeing B-17 Flying Fortress (1944–1945)
- North American P-51 Mustang (1945)
- Lockheed C-121 Constellation (1955–1969)
- Lockheed EC-121 Warning Star (1955–1969)
- Lockheed RC-121 Warning Star (1955–1969)
- Boeing E-3 Sentry (1986 – present)
