= Stanley Friedman =

Stanley Friedman may refer to:

- Stanley M. Friedman (born 1936), deputy mayor of New York City
- Stanley P. Friedman (1925–2006), American author and photographer
