= Debach =

Village in Suffolk, England

Coordinates: 52°08′N 1°17′E

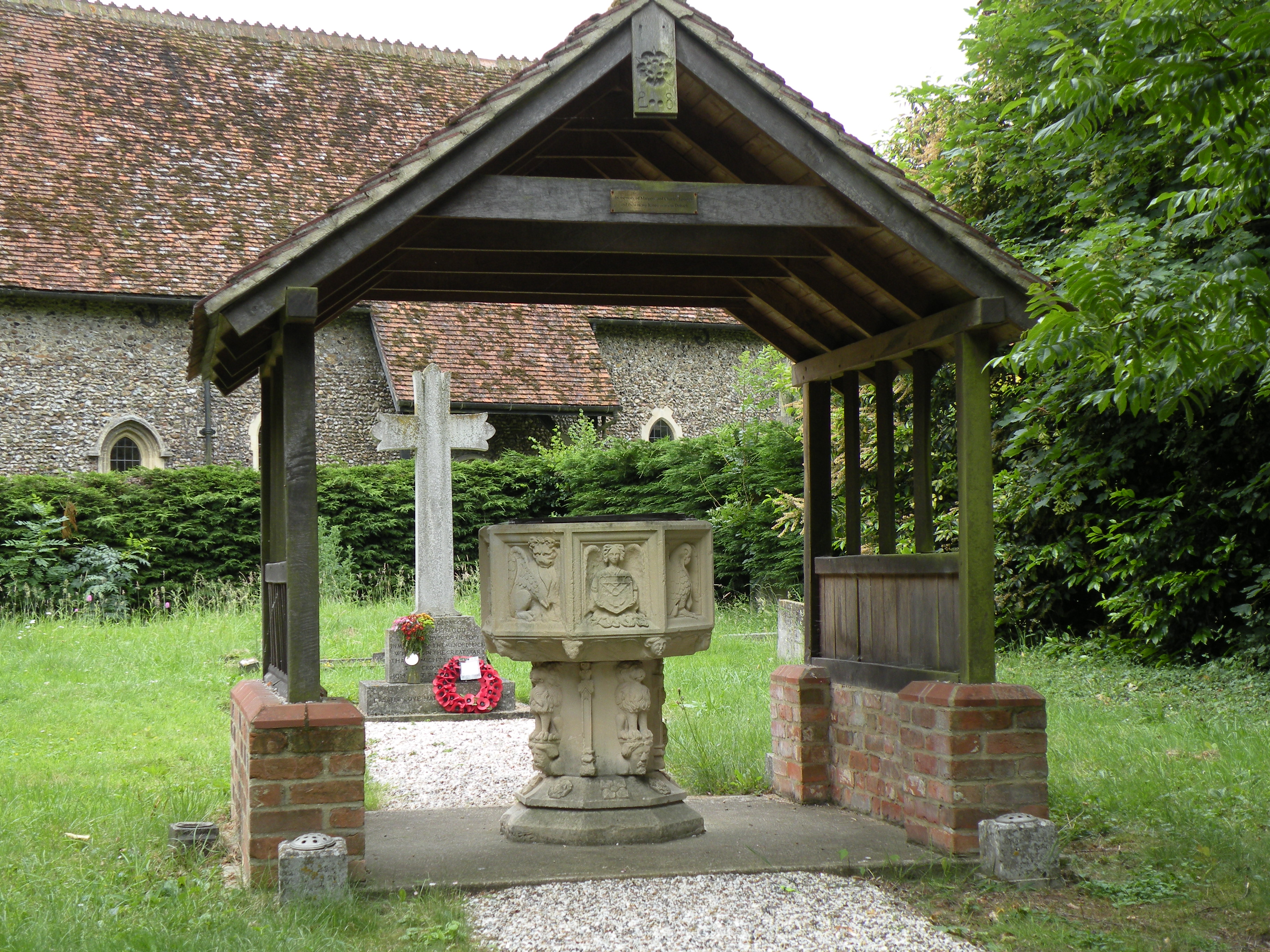
The lychgate, font and war memorial

Debach audio is a small village about four miles northwest of Woodbridge, Suffolk, UK.

== History ==
=== Medieval ===
At the time of the Domesday Book, 1086, it was called Debenbeis or Debeis, Depebecs, Debec or Debes and located in the Hundred of Wilford. The book lists the landowners there at that time as Count Alan, Roger Bigot - the Sheriff of Norfolk and Suffolk, and Sturstan son of Widdow and Roger de Poitou from him, The Bishop of Bayeux, William de Warenne, Geoffrey de Mandeville and Ranulph Peveril. There were 9.5 households in the village and the taxable value to the lord at that time was £0.2. The survey recorded that the village's resources included an acre of meadow, one church and 0.06 acres of church land.

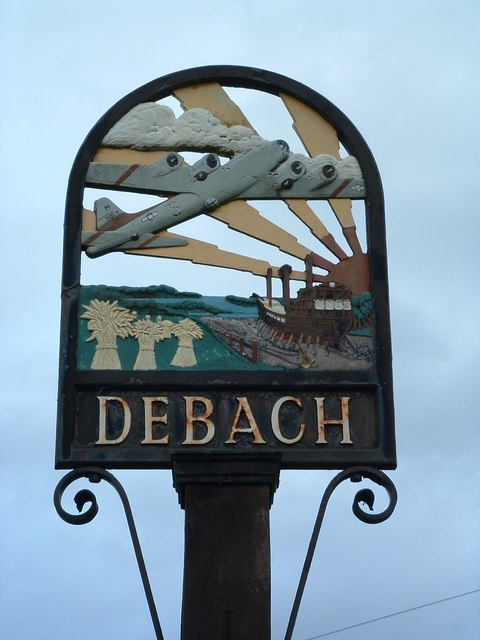
Debach village sign

In 1066, Edric Grimm had been the overlord of Debach.

=== Modern ===
The 2001 census recorded 30 households in the village with a total population of 75. The population was estimated to consist of 80 people in 2005, including Boulge and increasing again to 126 according to the 2011 Census. These figures were notably smaller than those recorded in 19th-century censuses:- in 1801 the population of Debach was 117, in 1851 there was a total population of 113 in 25 households and in 1881 a total of 138 people lived there in 29 households with about 66% of those whose occupation was recorded being employed directly in agriculture. The population peaked at 140 in 1901 and 1911 and was still 127 in 1951 but fell by 1961 to 90.

During the Second World War the parish housed a Royal Air Force Station, RAF Debach, a bomber airfield which was transferred to the USAAF and became home to the 493rd Bombardment Group. The airfield closed soon after the war and was used as a prisoner-of-war camp in 1945 for German prisoners. Parts of the runway are still visible, but are in a poor state. The former airfield is now the site of Debach Enterprises, grain storage, a cafe and is also home to the Green Label food company, situated at Loomswood Farm, which specialises in the production of Gressingham duck.

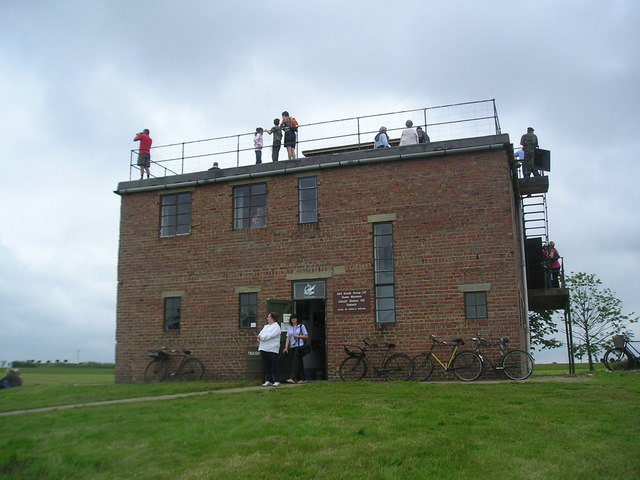
The control tower at Debach airfield

== All Saints' Church ==
The former parish church of Debach dates back to the 13th century and was renovated in 1794. It was almost completely rebuilt and enlarged by George Gilbert Scott, 1854–1856. The work cost £1500, £400 of which was borrowed and only partially repaid which led to a local scandal and drove the aggrieved lender to publish a book in 1879 entitled How the Parish Of Debach Borrowed £400 And Refused To Pay It All Back.

The small local population resulted in there being only a handful of worshippers at the church in the 1960s and it was deconsecrated in 1971; the building was sold in 1979 to become a private residence. The 16th-century bell was bought by St Andrew's Church, Redlingfield in Suffolk and the wooden stand-alone belfry rotted away. Gravestones were moved to the front garden area where the village war memorial is also situated. The church building has also had its stained glass removed and the carved stone font has been moved to the front garden area. All Saints House, the former church, is a Grade II listed building.

== Notable residents ==
The author Ronald Blythe wrote the book Akenfield while living in Debach in 1966-7 and mentions the village - "a tiny parish of some eighty souls" - in the preface to the book.

Debach was the birthplace and home of Jimmy "Holy Jim" Knights (1882–1981), a singer of traditional East Anglian folk and music hall songs, whose renditions of such tunes were recorded by collectors of traditional music performances when he was more than 90 years old in the 1970s.
