= 361st Expeditionary Reconnaissance Squadron =

361st Expeditionary Reconnaissance Squadron

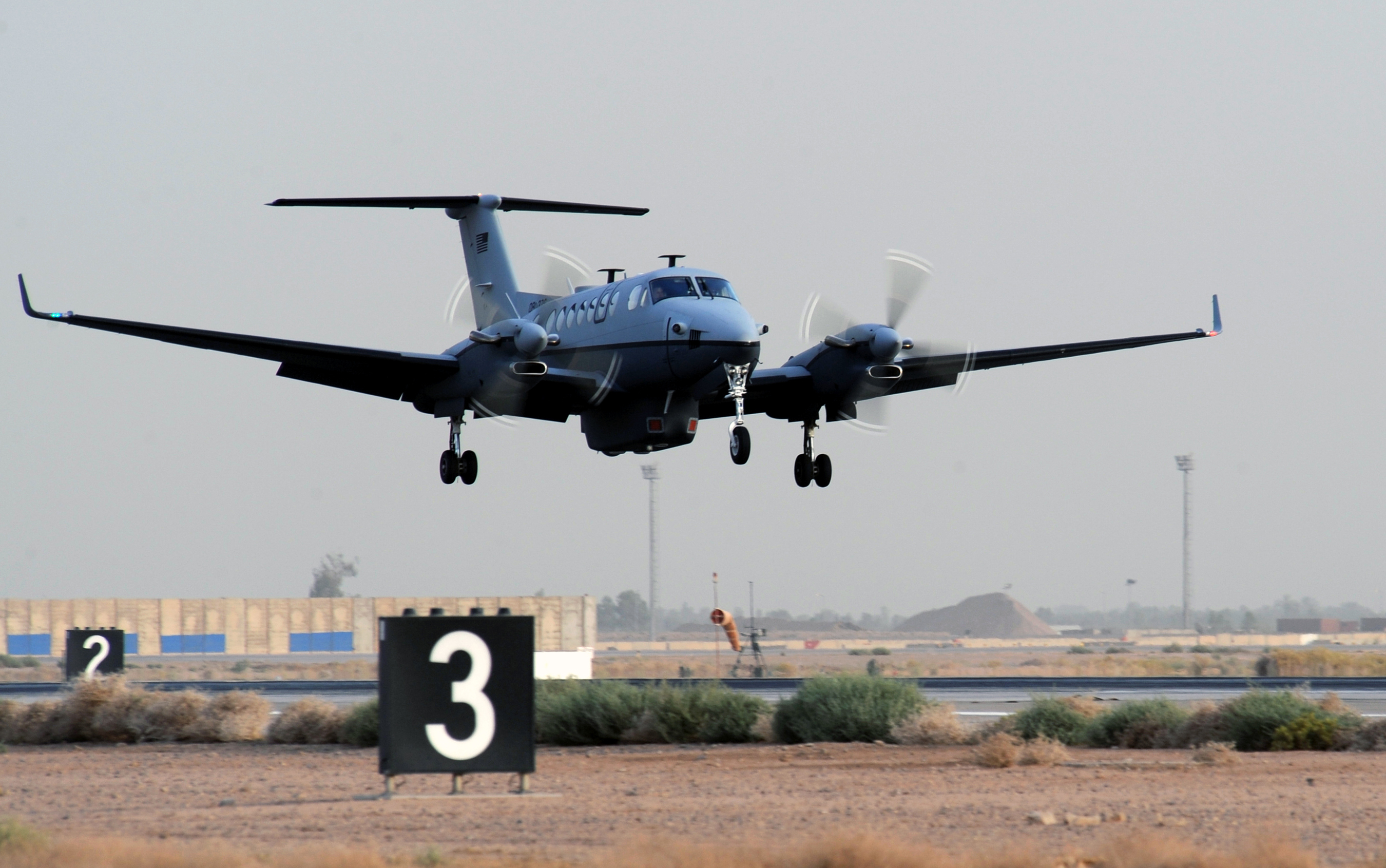
- MC-12 Liberty lands after a combat sortie
- Active: 1943–1945; 1966–1971; 1972–1974; 2007; 2010–2014
- Country: United States
- Branch: United States Air Force
- Role: Reconnaissance
- Part of: United States Air Forces Central Command
- Mottos: Find, Fix, Finish
- Engagements: European Theater of Operations; War on terrorism
- Decorations: Presidential Unit Citation; Air Force Meritorious Unit Award; Air Force Outstanding Unit Award with Combat "V" Device; Air Force Outstanding Unit Award; Vietnamese Gallantry Cross with Palm

Insignia
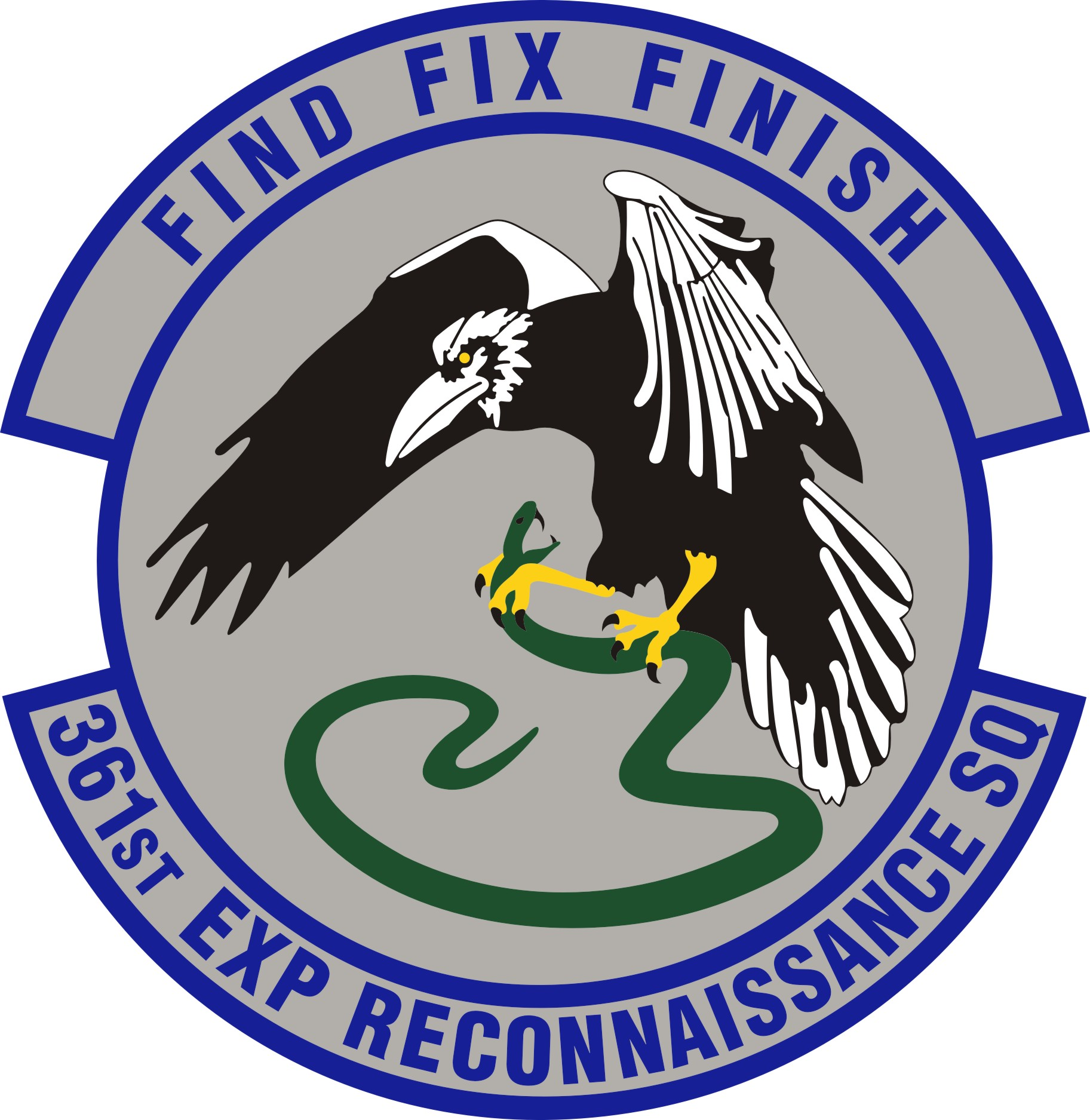
- 361 Expeditionary Reconnaissance Sq emblem
- World War II squadron fuselage code (Note: The 493d Group used single letter squadron codes, unlike other Eighth Air Force units, which used two letter codes. Watkins, p. 122.): B
- Vietnam War Tail Code: AL

The 361st Expeditionary Reconnaissance Squadron is a provisional United States Air Force unit. It was most recently assigned to the 451st Air Expeditionary Group at Kandahar Airfield, Afghanistan, where it was inactivated on 1 September 2014.

The squadron's first predecessor was the 861st Bombardment Squadron, a United States Army Air Forces unit that was assigned to the 493d Bombardment Group during World War II. It was part of the last bombardment group to be assigned to Eighth Air Force. It flew combat missions until V-E Day, then returned to the United States for inactivation.

The squadron's other predecessor, the 361st Reconnaissance Squadron was formed during the Vietnam War, flying Douglas EC-47 aircraft, performing electronic surveillance in Vietnam and Thailand until inactivating in 1974, when the United States withdrew from Southeast Asia. The squadrons were consolidated in 1985, then converted to provisional status as an expeditionary unit.

== History ==
=== World War II ===
==== Initial activation and training in the United States ====
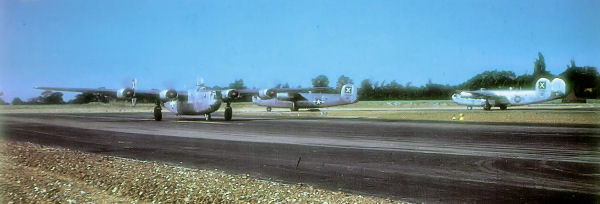
B-24s of the 493d Bomb Group at Debach

The 861st Bombardment Squadron, the first predecessor of the squadron, was first activated at McCook Army Air Field, Nebraska as one of the original four squadrons of the 493d Bombardment Group. The formation of the squadron was delayed by an administrative error that caused some of the unit's cadre to report to Davis-Monthan Field, Arizona instead of McCook. It was not until January that all personnel were at McCook. By this time, the squadron had transferred on paper to Elveden Hall, England. The ground personnel of the squadron in the United States had been used to form Boeing B-29 Superfortress units being activated by Second Air Force, while the air echelon remained in Nebraska to conduct training on their assigned Consolidated B-24 Liberators. Meanwhile, Eighth Air Force formed a new ground echelon for the squadron in England from other units assigned to the 3d Bombardment Division. This ground echelon moved to the squadron's combat station, RAF Debach, (Note: Unlike the majority of World War II Army Air Forces bases in Britain, Debach was built by Army aviation engineers. Anderson, p. 6.) in April 1944. The squadron's air echelon departed for England via the northern ferry route on 1 May, while a small ground component left McCook and sailed from Boston, Massachusetts on the SS Brazil (1928) on 12 May 1944.

==== Combat in Europe ====
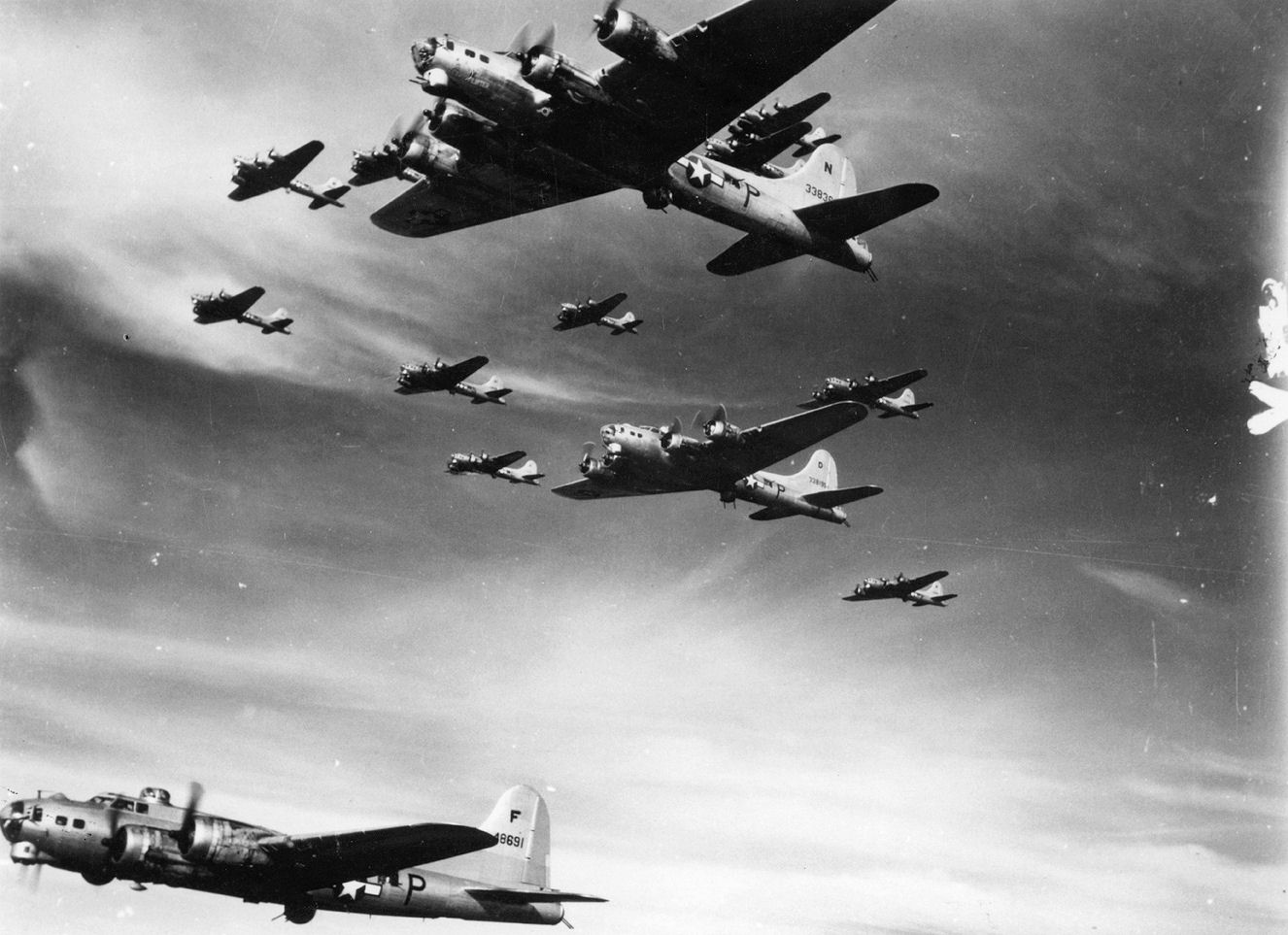
493d Bombardment Group B-17 formation

The squadron flew its first combat mission on D-Day, 6 June 1944. It continued to fly Liberators until 24 August 1944, when it was withdrawn from combat to convert to Boeing B-17 Flying Fortresses, along with other groups of the 93d Bombardment Wing, as Eighth Air Force concentrated all its Liberators in the 2d Bombardment Division. It resumed combat missions with the B-17 on 8 September 1944. The squadron concentrated its attacks on military and industrial targets in Germany, attacking an ordnance depot in Magdeburg, factories near Frankfurt, and a synthetic oil manufacturing plant at Merseburg. It also attacked lines of communications, including a railroad tunnel at Ahrweiler, bridges at Irlich, and marshalling yards near Cologne.

The squadron was occasionally diverted to attack tactical targets. It supported Operation Overlord, the Normandy invasion, striking artillery batteries, airfields and bridges. It struck enemy ground forces south of Caen and during Operation Cobra, the breakout at St Lo. It bombed German fortifications to support Operation Market Garden, airborne attacks attempting to secure a bridgehead across the Rhine in the Netherlands and attacked communications during the Battle of the Bulge. Toward the end of the war, it also supported Operation Varsity, the airborne assault across the Rhine in Germany.

The squadron flew its last combat mission against marshalling yards near Nauen on 20 April 1945, although it flew food-dropping missions in early May. The squadron air echelon departed Debach on 30 June, while the ground echelon sailed for home aboard the RMS Queen Elizabeth on 6 August 1945. In late August, the squadron assembled at Sioux Falls Army Air Field, South Dakota, where it was inactivated on 28 August 1945.

=== Vietnam War ===
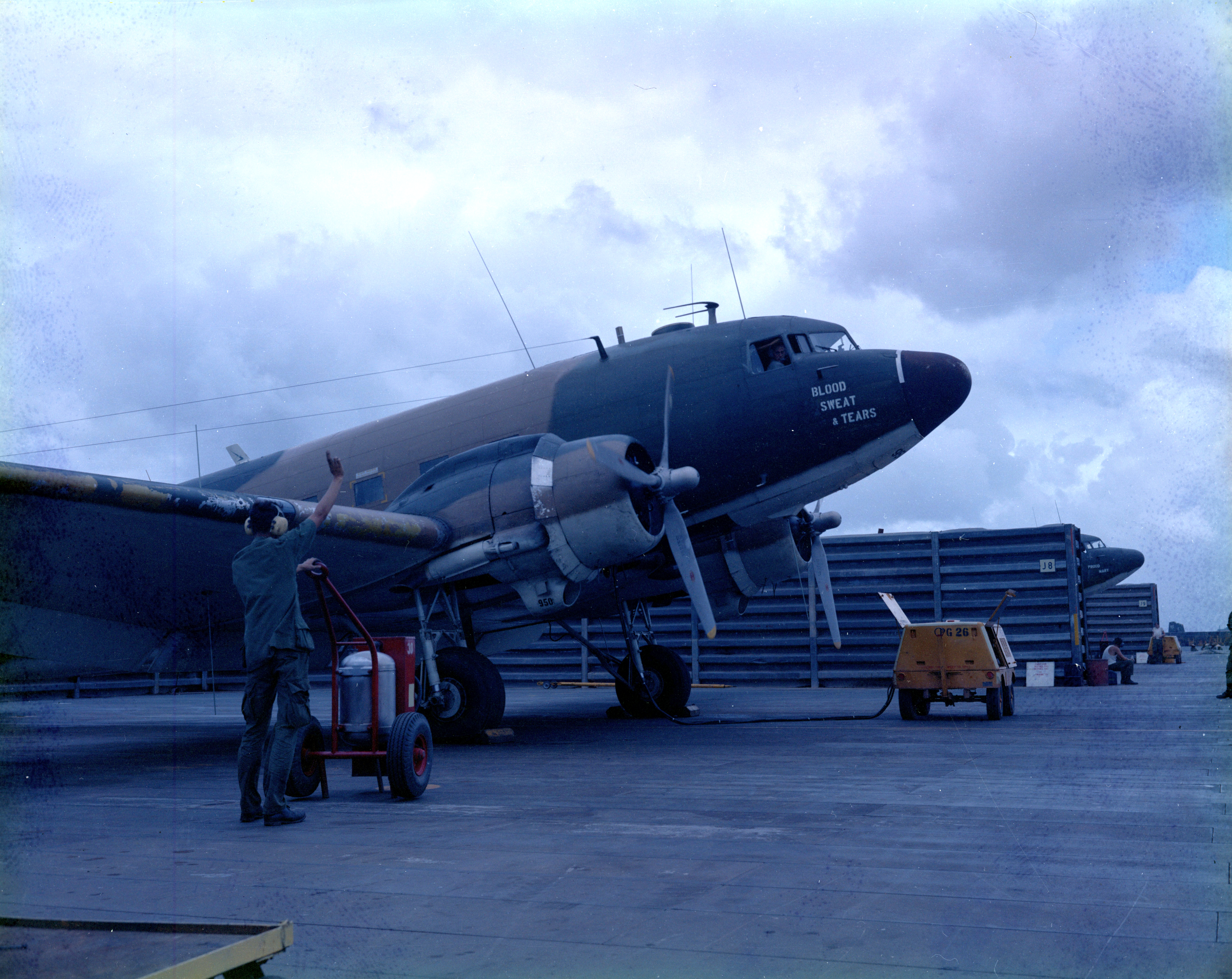
Squadron EC-47N in its revetment at Phu Cat Air Base (Note: Aircraft is Douglas a EC-47N Skytrain. Originally constructed as Douglas C-47A-75-DL, serial 42-100950. It was modified in June 1966 as an RC-47N and transferred to the VNAF in November 1972. Baugher, Joe (7 August 2023). "1942 USAF Serial Numbers". Joe Baugher.)

In January 1966, Military Assistance Command Vietnam expressed a requirement for airborne radio direction finding (ARDF) to intercept enemy radio traffic to locate enemy units. That month, the Air Force began Project Phyllis Ann, which modified 35 Douglas C-47 Skytrains by installing AN/ARD-18 direction finding equipment in them..

The squadron's second predecessor, 361st Reconnaissance Squadron, was organized at Nha Trang Air Base, South Vietnam in April 1966, flying RC-47 aircraft equipped for ARDF. Detachment 1 of the 6994th Security Squadron operated the planes' direction finding equipment. In July 1966, Detachment 1 of the squadron was established at Pleiku Air Base, although its first "Electric Goony" did not arrive until December. On 1 February 1967, Detachment 1 was discontinued and transferred its personnel and equipment to the newly organized 362d Reconnaissance Squadron.

In the spring of 1967, the squadron was redesignated the 361st Tactical Electronic Warfare Squadron and its RC-47 aircraft became EC-47s. Its mission equipment changed its name from AN/ARD-18 to AN/ALR-34, (Note: Under the Army Navy (AN/) system for naming electronics systems by platform/system/purpose, ARD stood for Aircraft Radio Detection, while ALR stood for Aircraft Countermeasures Receiver. Martin, Year of the Offensive.) and Project Phyllis Ann became Project Compass Dart.

During the November 1967 Battle of Dak To, squadron ARDF identified NVA units moving toward the Dak To Base Camp. During the battle, squadron identification of the location of enemy units was used to target Boeing B-52 Stratofortress strikes on "known base areas, infiltration routes and strong points." Squadron provided ARDF frequently provided location information for B-52 strikes.

In late February 1968, a squadron aircraft returning to base from a mission picked up signals coming from the South China Sea. ARDF fixes were made on three of the four transmitters, which were trawlers transporting arms to the Viet Cong. The locations were transmitted to the Navy's Operation Market Time blockading force, which sank one trawler and forced the other two aground in "one of the most significant victories" of the operation.

Operations over Laos became increasingly dangerous with the increase in air defenses there. In March 1968, a squadron aircraft, Brew 41, operating in the Steel Tiger area was hit by 37mm fire. The pilot was able to crash land the plane on an abandoned Special Forces camp across the border in South Vietnam.

The squadron moved to Thailand in 1972 as part of the USAF drawdown in South Vietnam. It continued missions over Indochina until 15 August 1973 when United States military flights over Indochina were halted by congressional mandate. The squadron trained in Thailand until its inactivation on 30 June 1974.

=== War on terrorism ===
The squadron reactivated as the 361st Expeditionary Reconnaissance Squadron as part of the war on terrorism in 2003. Assigned to first the 407th Air Expeditionary Group, then later the 451st Air Expeditionary Group, the squadron operated a variety of surveillance & reconnaissance aircraft before the United States withdrew from Iraq in 2011 and Afghanistan in 2014.

== Lineage ==
861st Bombardment Squadron

- Constituted as the 861st Bombardment Squadron (Heavy) on 14 September 1943

Activated on 1 November 1943
Redesignated 861st Bombardment Squadron, Heavy on 21 February 1944
Inactivated on 28 August 1945

- Consolidated with the 361st Tactical Electronic Warfare Squadron as the 361st Tactical Electronic Warfare Squadron on 19 September 1985

361st Reconnaissance Squadron

- Constituted as the 361st Reconnaissance Squadron and activated on 4 April 1966 (not organized)

Organized on 8 April 1966
Redesignated 361st Tactical Electronic Warfare Squadron on 15 March 1967
Inactivated on 1 December 1971

- Activated on 1 September 1972

Inactivated on 30 June 1974

- Consolidated with the 861st Bombardment Squadron on 19 September 1985

Redesignated 361st Expeditionary Reconnaissance Squadron and converted to provisional status
Activated c. December 2007
Inactivated unknown
Activated 1 May 2010
Inactivated on 1 September 2014

=== Assignments ===
- 493d Bombardment Group, 1 November 1943 – 28 August 1945
- Pacific Air Forces, 4 April 1966 (not organized)
- 460th Tactical Reconnaissance Wing, 8 April 1966
- 483d Tactical Airlift Wing, 31 August 1971 – 1 December 1971
- 56th Special Operations Wing, 1 September 1972 – 30 June 1974
- Air Combat Command to activate or inactivate as needed

407th Air Expeditionary Group, c. November 2007 – unknown
451st Air Expeditionary Group, 20 May 2010 – 1 September 2014

=== Stations ===
- McCook Army Air Field, Nebraska, 1 November 1943 – 1 Jan 1944
- Elveden Hall (Station 116), (Note: Elveden Hall was a manor house, not an airfield. Anderson, p. 9. It was also referred to as Camp Blainey. Anderson, p. 12.) England, 1 January 1944
- RAF Debach (Station 152), England, 17 April 1944 – 6 August 1945
- Sioux Falls Army Air Field, South Dakota, c. 13–28 August 1945
- Nha Trang Air Base, Republic of Vietnam, 8 April 1966
- Phu Cat Air Base, Republic of Vietnam, 1 September 1969 – 1 December 1971
- Nakhon Phanom Royal Thai Air Force Base, Thailand, 1 September 1972 – 30 June 1974
- Ali Air Base, Iraq, c. November 2007
- Kandahar Airfield, Afghanistan, 20 May 2010 – 1 September 2014

=== Aircraft ===
- Consolidated B-24 Liberator, 1943–1944
- Boeing B-17 Flying Fortress. 1944-1945
- Douglas C-47 Skytrain, 1967-1971, 1972-1974
- Douglas EC-47H Skytrain, 1967-1971, 1972-1974
- Beechcraft MC-12W Liberty, 2010-2014

=== Awards and campaigns ===
Award streamer	Award	Dates	Notes
	Presidential Unit Citation	8 April 1966-13 June 1967	361st Reconnaissance Squadron (later 361st Tactical Electronic Warfare Squadron)
	Presidential Unit Citation	1 September 1967-10 July 1968	361st Tactical Electronic Warfare Squadron
	Presidential Unit Citation	11 July 1968-31 August 1969	361st Tactical Electronic Warfare Squadron
	Presidential Unit Citation	1 February 1971-31 March 1971	361st Tactical Electronic Warfare Squadron
	Air Force Meritorious Unit Award	1 June 2011-31 January 2012	361st Expeditionary Reconnaissance Squadron
	Air Force Meritorious Unit Award	1 February 2012-31 January 2013	361st Expeditionary Reconnaissance Squadron
	Air Force Meritorious Unit Award	1 February 2013-1 April 2014	361st Expeditionary Reconnaissance Squadron
	Air Force Meritorious Unit Award	1 October 2014-9 April 2015	361st Expeditionary Reconnaissance Squadron
	Air Force Meritorious Unit Award	15 May 2014-2 May 2016	361st Expeditionary Reconnaissance Squadron
	Air Force Outstanding Unit Award with Combat "V" Device	1 July 1969-30 June 1970	361st Tactical Electronic Warfare Squadron
	Air Force Outstanding Unit Award with Combat "V" Device	1 July 1970-30 June 1971	361st Tactical Electronic Warfare Squadron
	Air Force Outstanding Unit Award with Combat "V" Device	1 September 1971-31 December 1971	361st Tactical Electronic Warfare Squadron
	Air Force Outstanding Unit Award with Combat "V" Device	23 February 1973-28 February 1974	361st Tactical Electronic Warfare Squadron
	Air Force Outstanding Unit Award	15 April 1966-31 May 1967	361st Reconnaissance Squadron (later 361st Tactical Electronic Warfare Squadron)
	Vietnamese Gallantry Cross with Palm	8 April 1966-14 Mar 1967	361st Reconnaissance Squadron
	Vietnamese Gallantry Cross with Palm	15 March 1967-1 September 1972	361st Tactical Electronic Warfare Squadron

Campaign Streamer	Campaign	Dates	Notes
	Air Combat, EAME Theater	1 January 1944 – 11 May 1945	861st Bombardment Squadron
	Normandy	6 June 1944 – 24 July 1944	861st Bombardment Squadron
	Northern France	25 July 1944 – 14 September 1944	861st Bombardment Squadron
	Rhineland	15 September 1944 – 21 March 1945	861st Bombardment Squadron
	Ardennes-Alsace	16 December 1944 – 25 January 1945	861st Bombardment Squadron
	Central Europe	22 March 1944 – 21 May 1945	861st Bombardment Squadron
	Vietnam Air	8 April 1966 – 28 June 1966	361st Reconnaissance Squadron
	Vietnam Air Offensive	29 June 1966 – 8 March 1967	361st Reconnaissance Squadron
	Vietnam Air Offensive, Phase II	9 March 1967 – 31 March 1968	361st Reconnaissance Squadron (later 361st Tactical Electronic Warfare Squadron)
	Vietnam Air/Ground	22 January 1968 – 7 July 1968	361st Tactical Electronic Warfare Squadron
	Vietnam Air Offensive, Phase III	1 April 1968 – 31 October 1968	361st Tactical Electronic Warfare Squadron
	Vietnam Air Offensive, Phase IV	1 November 1968 – 22 February 1969	361st Tactical Electronic Warfare Squadron
	Tet 1969/Counteroffensive	23 February 1969 – 8 June 1969	361st Tactical Electronic Warfare Squadron
	Vietnam Summer-Fall 1969	9 June 1969 – 31 October 1969	361st Tactical Electronic Warfare Squadron
	Vietnam Winter-Spring 1970	3 November 1969 – 30 April 1970	361st Tactical Electronic Warfare Squadron
	Sanctuary Counteroffensive	1 May 1970 – 30 June 1970	361st Tactical Electronic Warfare Squadron
	Southwest Monsoon	1 July 1970 – 30 November 1970	361st Tactical Electronic Warfare Squadron
	Commando Hunt V	1 December 1970 – 14 May 1971	361st Tactical Electronic Warfare Squadron
	Commando Hunt VI	15 May 1971 – 31 July 1971	361st Tactical Electronic Warfare Squadron
	Commando Hunt VII	1 November 1971 – 29 March 1972	361st Tactical Electronic Warfare Squadron
	Iraqi Surge	10 January 2007 – 31 December 2008	361st Expeditionary Reconnaissance Squadron
	Iraqi Sovereignty	1 January 2009 – 31 August 2010	361st Expeditionary Reconnaissance Squadron
	Global War on Terror Expeditionary Medal		361st Expeditionary Reconnaissance Squadron

== See also ==
- Baron 52
