= 860th Bombardment Squadron =

860th Bombardment Squadron (later 967th Airborne Warning & Control Squadron)
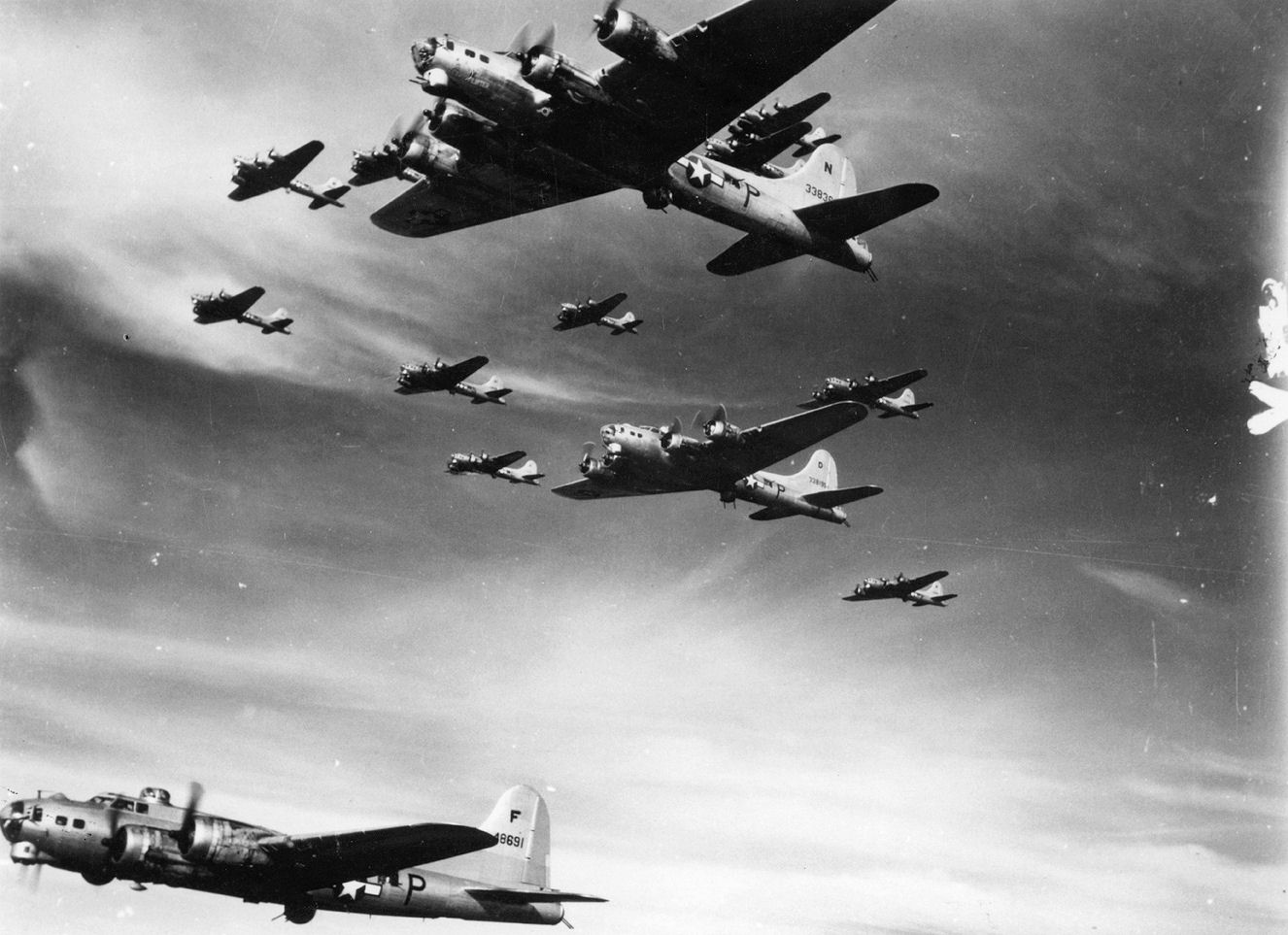
- 493d Bombardment Group B-17 Flying Fortress Formation
- Active: 1942-1945; 1959-1962
- Country: United States
- Branch: United States Air Force
- Role: Bombardment
- Motto: Defensor Pacem (Latin for 'Defender of Peace') (1959-1962)
- Engagements: European Theater of Operations

Insignia
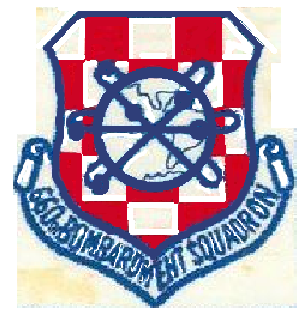
- 660th Bombardment Squadron emblem (1959-1962)

The 860th Bombardment Squadron is a former United States Army Air Forces unit that was assigned to the 493d Bombardment Group during World War II. It was part of the last bombardment group to be assigned to Eighth Air Force. It flew combat missions until V-E Day, then returned to the United States for inactivation. In 1985, the squadron was consolidated with the 660th Bombardment Squadron, a Strategic Air Command unit that flew Boeing B-47 Stratojets during the Cold War. Although the two squadrons were consolidated as the 967th Airborne Warning and Control Squadron, they have never been active under that designation.

== History ==
=== World War II ===
==== Initial activation and training in the United States ====
The 860th Bombardment Squadron was first activated in September 1943 at McCook Army Air Field, Nebraska as one of the original four squadrons of the 493d Bombardment Group. The formation of the squadron was delayed by an administrative error that caused some of the unit's cadre to report to Davis-Monthan Field, Arizona instead of McCook. It was not until January 1944 that all personnel were at McCook. By this time, the squadron had transferred on paper to Elveden Hall, England. The ground personnel of the squadron in the United States had been used to form Boeing B-29 Superfortress units being activated by Second Air Force, while the air echelon remained in Nebraska to conduct training on their assigned Consolidated B-24 Liberators. Meanwhile, Eighth Air Force formed a new ground echelon for the squadron in England from other units assigned to the 3d Bombardment Division. This ground echelon moved to the squadron's combat station, RAF Debach, in April 1944. The squadron's air echelon departed for England via the northern ferry route on 1 May, while a small ground component left McCook and sailed from Boston, Massachusetts on the SS Brazil (1928) on 12 May 1944.

==== Combat in Europe ====
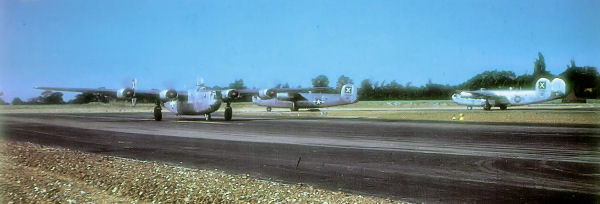
B-24s of the 493d Bomb Group at Debach

The squadron flew its first combat mission on D-Day, 6 June 1944. It continued to fly Liberators until 24 August 1944, when it was withdrawn from combat to convert to Boeing B-17 Flying Fortresses, along with other units of the 93d Bombardment Wing, as Eighth Air Force concentrated all its Liberators in the 2d Bombardment Division. It resumed combat missions with the B-17 on 8 September 1944. The squadron concentrated its attacks on military and industrial targets in Germany, attacking an ordnance depot in Magdeburg, factories near Frankfurt, and a synthetic oil manufacturing plant at Merseburg. It also attacked lines of communications, including a railroad tunnel at Ahrweiler, bridges at Irlich, and marshalling yards near Cologne.

The squadron was occasionally diverted from the strategic bombing campaign to attack tactical targets. It supported Operation Overlord, the Normandy invasion, striking artillery batteries, airfields and bridges. It struck enemy ground forces south of Caen and during Operation Cobra, the breakout at St Lo. It bombed German fortifications to support Operation Market Garden, airborne attacks attempting to secure a bridgehead across the Rhine in the Netherlands, and attacked communications during the Battle of the Bulge. Toward the end of the war, it also supported Operation Varsity, the airborne assault across the Rhine in Germany.

The squadron flew its last combat mission against marshalling yards near Nauen on 20 April 1945, although it flew food-dropping missions in early May. The squadron air echelon departed Debach on 30 June, while the ground echelon sailed for home aboard the RMS Queen Elizabeth on 6 August 1945. In late August, the squadron assembled at Sioux Falls Army Air Field, South Dakota, where it was inactivated on 28 August 1945.

=== Strategic Air Command ===
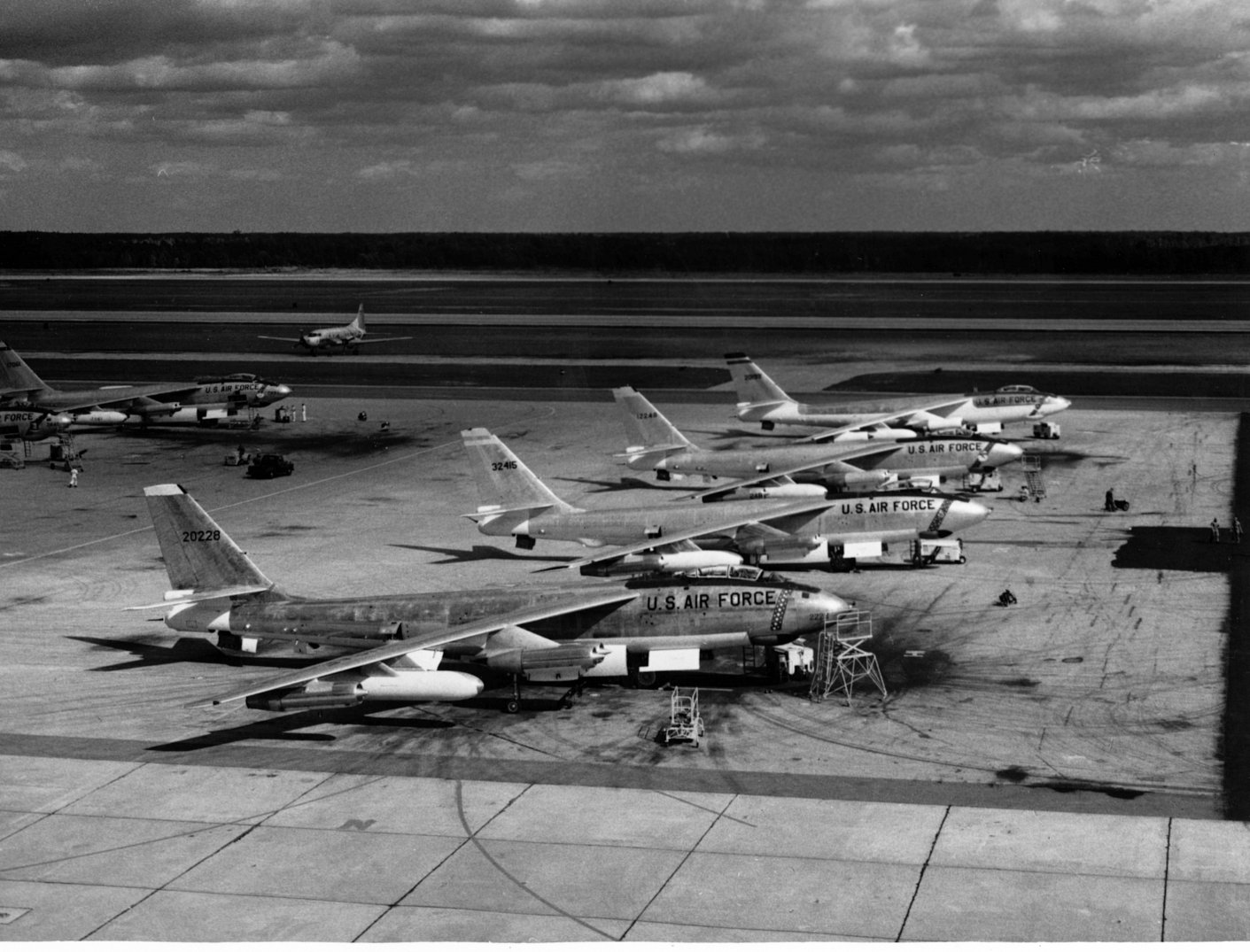
B-47s of Strategic Air Command

Starting in 1958, the Boeing B-47 Stratojet wings of Strategic Air Command (SAC) began to assume an alert posture at their home bases, reducing the amount of time spent on alert at overseas bases. The SAC alert cycle divided itself into four parts: planning, flying, alert and rest to meet General Thomas S. Power's initial goal of maintaining one third of SAC's planes on fifteen minute ground alert, fully fueled and ready for combat to reduce vulnerability to a Soviet missile strike. To implement this new system, B-47 wings reorganized from three to four squadrons. The 660th Bombardment Squadron was activated at Forbes Air Force Base, Kansas as the fourth squadron of the 40th Bombardment Wing. The SAC alert commitment was increased to half the wing's aircraft in 1962 and the four squadron pattern no longer met the alert cycle commitment, so the squadron was inactivated on 1 January 1962.

=== Consolidation ===
In September 1985, the 860th Bombardment Squadron and the 660th Bombardment Squadron were consolidated as the 967th Airborne Warning and Control Squadron.

== Lineage ==
860th Bombardment Squadron

- Constituted as the 860th Bombardment Squadron (Heavy) on 14 September 1943

Activated on 1 November 1943
Redesignated 860 Bombardment Squadron, Heavy on 21 February 1944
Inactivated on 28 August 1945
Consolidated with the 660th Bombardment Squadron as the 967th Airborne Warning and Control Squadron on 19 September 1985

967th Airborne Warning and Control Squadron

- Constituted in 1958 as the 660th Bombardment Squadron, Medium

Activated on 1 February 1959
Inactivated on 1 January 1962

- Consolidated with the 860th Bombardment Squadron as the 967th Airborne Warning and Control Squadron on 15 September 1985

=== Assignments ===
- 493d Bombardment Group, 1 November 1943 – 28 August 1945
- 40th Bombardment Wing, 1 February 1959 – 1 January 1962

=== Stations ===
- McCook Army Air Field, Nebraska, 1 November 1943 – 1 January 1944
- Elveden Hall, England (Station 116), England, 1 January 1944
- RAF Debach (Station 152), England, 17 April 1944 – 6 August 1945
- Sioux Falls Army Air Field, South Dakota, c. 13–28 August 1945
- Forbes Air Force Base, Kansas, 1 February 1959 - 1 January 1962

=== Aircraft ===
- Consolidated B-24 Liberator, 1943–1944
- Boeing B-17 Flying Fortress, 1944-1945
- Boeing B-47 Stratojet, 1959-1962

=== Campaigns ===
Campaign Streamer	Campaign	Dates	Notes
	Air Combat, EAME Theater	1 January 1944 – 11 May 1945	860th Bombardment Squadron
	Normandy	6 June 1944 – 24 July 1944	860th Bombardment Squadron
	Northern France	25 July 1944 – 14 September 1944	860th Bombardment Squadron
	Rhineland	15 September 1944 – 21 March 1945	860th Bombardment Squadron
	Ardennes-Alsace	16 December 1944 – 25 January 1945	860th Bombardment Squadron
	Central Europe	22 March 1944 – 21 May 1945	860th Bombardment Squadron

== See also ==
- B-17 Flying Fortress units of the United States Army Air Forces
- B-24 Liberator units of the United States Army Air Forces
- List of B-47 units of the United States Air Force
