= RAF Debach =

Former RAF station in Suffolk, England

RAF Debach USAAF Station 152
- Located Near Woodbridge, Suffolk
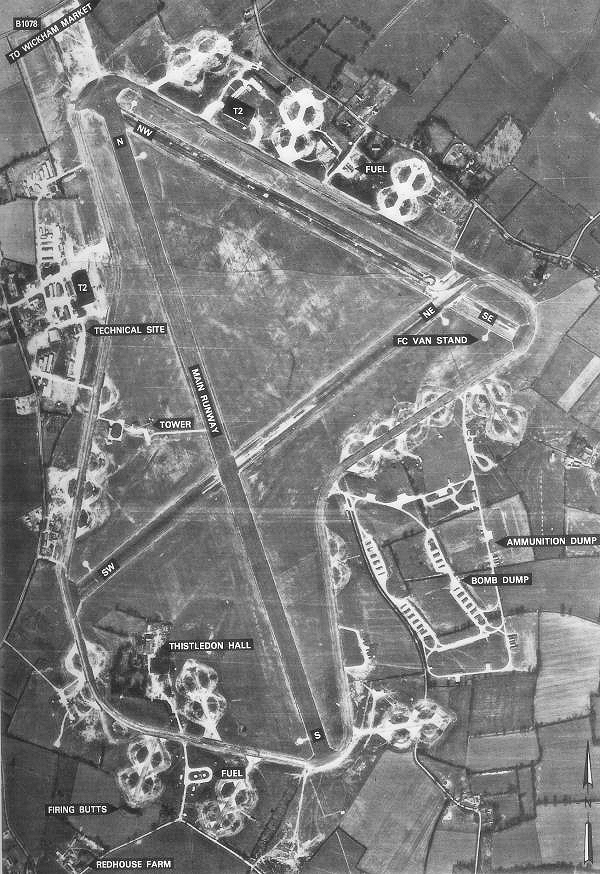
- Aerial Photo of Debach Airfield - 15 April 1946

Site information
- Type: Royal Air Force station
- Controlled by: Royal Air Force; United States Army Air Forces

Location
- RAF Debach, shown within Suffolk
- Coordinates: 52°08′19.95″N 001°16′11.06″E

Site history
- Built: 1943
- In use: 1944-1946
- Battles/wars: European Theatre of World War II; Air Offensive, Europe July 1942 - May 1945

Royal Air Force Debach or more simply RAF Debach is a former Royal Air Force station located at Debach, 3 miles (4.8 km) northwest of Woodbridge, Suffolk, England.

== United States Army Air Forces use ==
Debach was one of the last Eighth Air Force heavy bomber stations to be occupied, being built by the 820th Engineer Battalion (Aviation) of the US Army during 1943/1944. It was assigned USAAF designation Station 152 (DC).

USAAF Station Units assigned to RAF Debach were:

- 480th Sub-Depot
- 18th Weather Squadron
- 330th Station Complement Squadron
- 1143rd Military Police Company
- 1227th Quartermaster Company
- 1788th Ordnance Supply & Maintenance Company
- 878th Chemical Company
- 2117th Engineer Fire Fighting Platoon

=== 493rd Bombardment Group (Heavy) ===
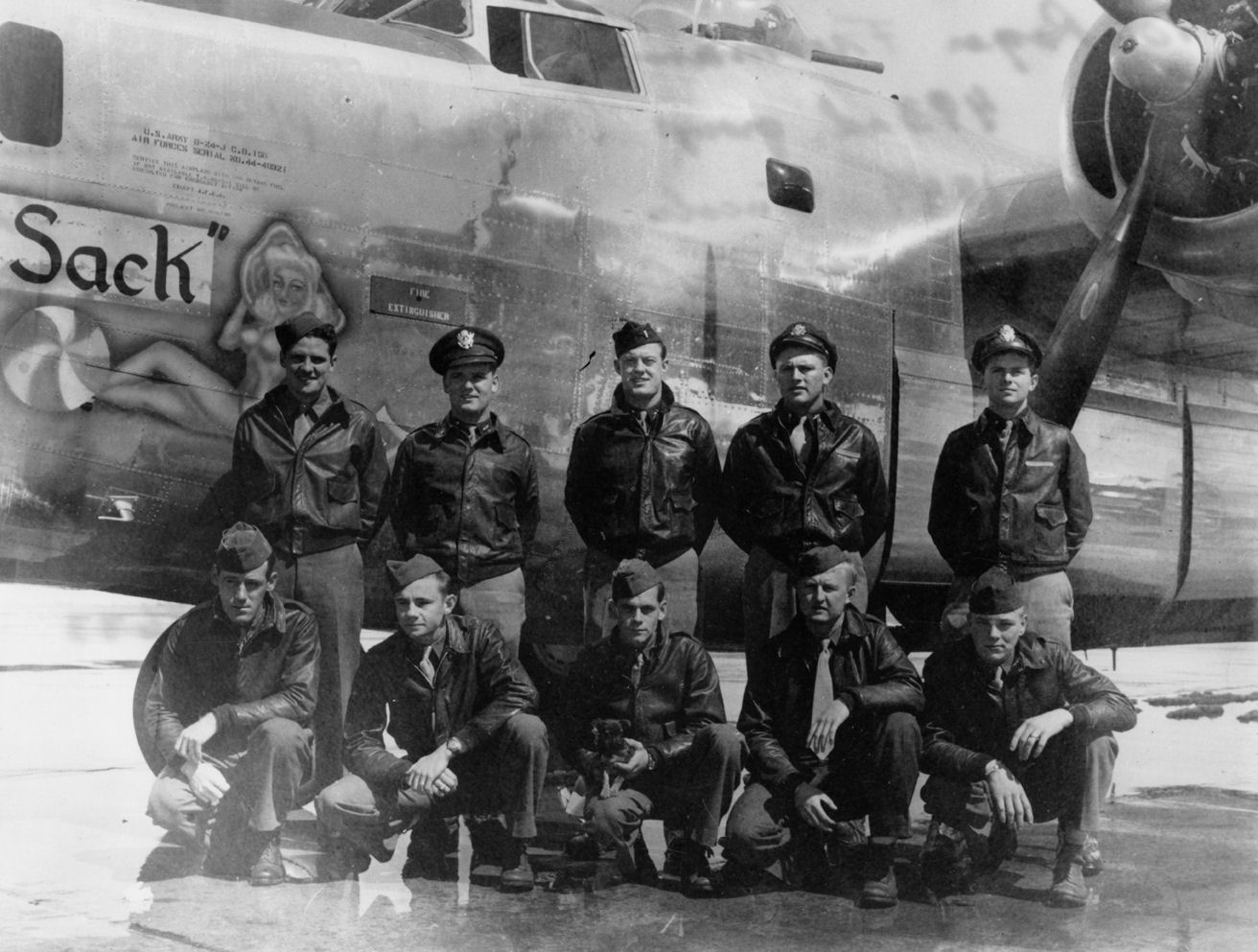
Crew photo of 493d Bombardment Group Consolidated B-24J Liberator 44-40321 "Old Sack", RAF Debach, Photo taken spring 1944.

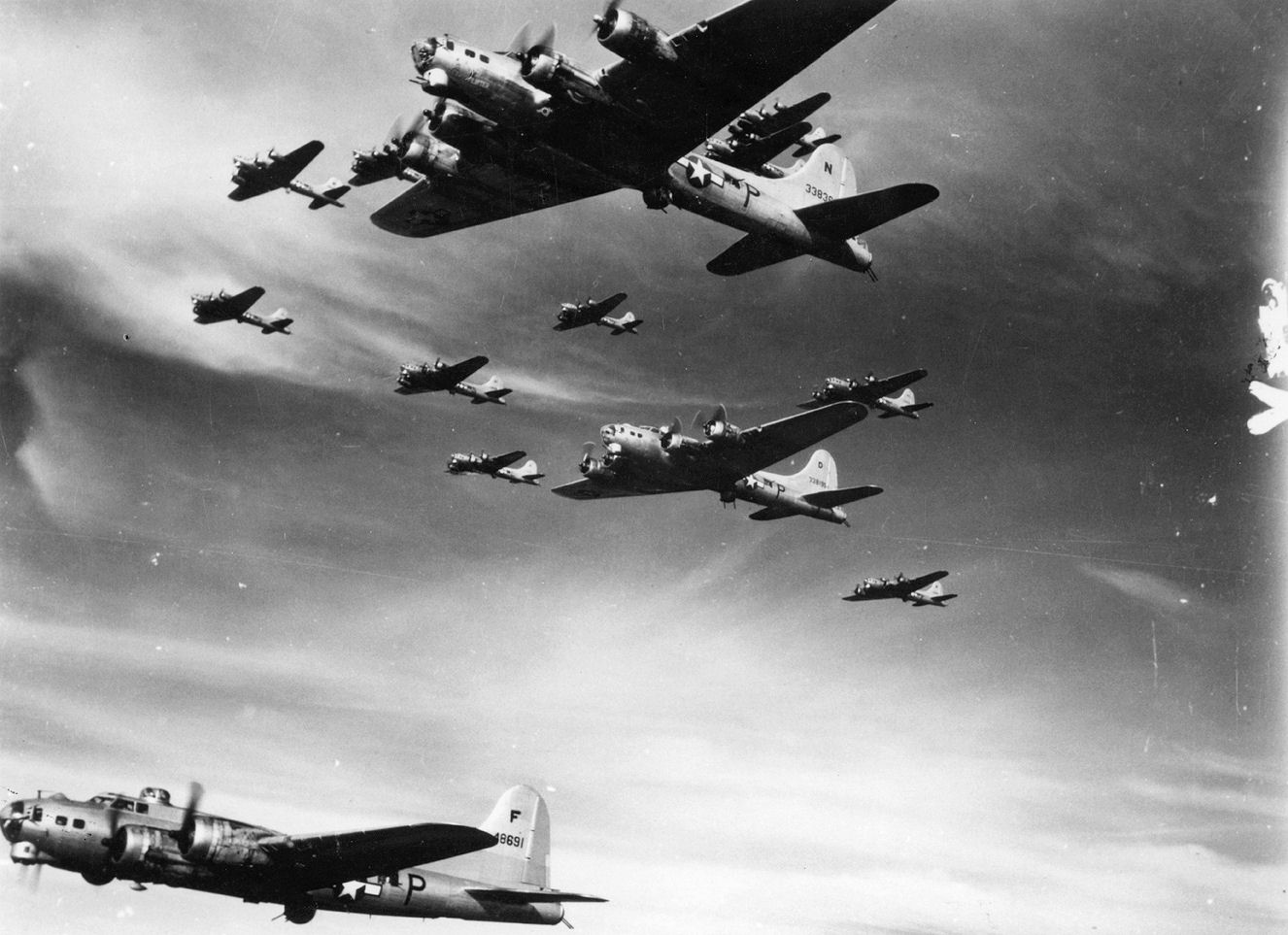
Formation of 493rd Bombardment Group, B-17 Flying Fortresses at 27,900 Ft, over Schleissmen, Germany 9 April 1945.

The airfield was opened in April 1944 and was used by the United States Army Air Forces 8th Air Force 493d Bombardment Group (Heavy), arriving from Elveden Hall. The 493d was assigned to the 93d Combat Bombardment Wing, and the group tail code was a "Square-X" while equipped with B-24s. Its operational squadrons were:

- 860th Bombardment Squadron (NG)
- 861st Bombardment Squadron (G6)
- 862d Bombardment Squadron (8M)
- 863d Bombardment Squadron (Q4)

The group flew both the Consolidated B-24 Liberator and the Boeing B-17 Flying Fortress as part of the Eighth Air Force's strategic bombing campaign. Debach airfield was the last Eighth Air Force heavy bomber station to become operational, the group flying its first mission on D-Day. Unfortunately the American engineers had not made a very satisfactory job of constructing the runway and the concrete soon started to break up. By the end of 1944, the runway was so bad that the group had to move temporarily to RAF Little Walden while runways were repaired and strengthened. The group returned to Debach in March 1945.

The 493d BG used B-24's until they were replaced with B-17's in September 1944. The group operated chiefly against industrial and military installations in Germany, attacking an ordnance depot at Magdeburg, marshalling yards at Cologne, synthetic oil plants at Merseburg, a railroad tunnel at Ahrweiler, bridges at Irlich, factories at Frankfurt, and other strategic objectives. On 25 September, a bombardment of Strasbourg left a number of buildings destroyed in the historical city centre.

Additional operations included striking airfields, bridges, and gun batteries prior to and during the invasion of Normandy in June 1944; hitting enemy positions to assist ground forces south of Caen and at Saint-Lô in July 1944; bombing German fortifications to cover the airborne attack on the Netherlands in September 1944; attacking enemy communications during the Battle of the Bulge, December 1944-January 1945; and assisting the airborne assault across the Rhine in March 1945.

The 493d Bomb Group flew its last combat mission, an attack on marshalling yards at Nauen, on 20 April 1945.

The unit returned to Sioux Falls AAF South Dakota and was inactivated on 28 August 1945.

== Postwar use ==
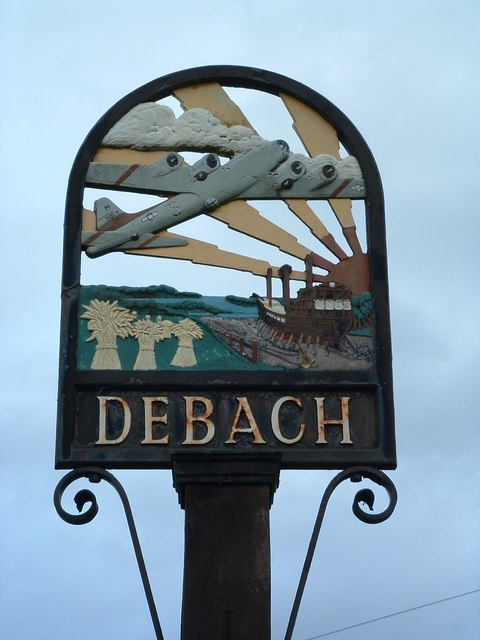
The USAAF is remembered in the village sign.

After the war, Debach was used first as a prisoner-of-war camp for German PoWs and later for displaced persons before being abandoned about 1948. It was sold in 1963-64, the main N–S runway becoming the boundary between two adjoining farms. The more interesting western side includes the control tower and several original buildings.

The northern end of the main runway was sold in 1969 for the construction of a mushroom farm. Much of the concrete runways and taxiways were ground into aggregate for use during road building, and the land reclaimed to be used for agricultural crops. Many of the buildings on the former Technical site were torn down with one man being killed during the removal of the north-east T2 hangar. The other hangar is now a farm grain store. The control tower still stands and has been completely restored with other close buildings being used to display artefacts and act as a museum to 493rd Bomb Group. Pylons carrying electricity now cross the southern edge of the former airfield.

== See also ==
- List of former Royal Air Force stations
