= 493rd Bombardment Group =

493d Bombardment Group (later 493d Air Expeditionary Group)
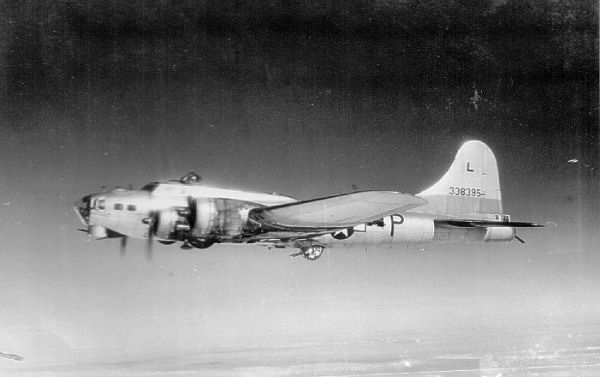
- 493d Bombardment Group Boeing B-17G (Note: Aircraft is Boeing B-17G-85-BO Flying Fortress, serial 43-38395.)
- Active: 1942–1945
- Country: United States
- Branch: United States Air Force
- Role: Bombardment
- Nickname: Helton's Hellcats (Note: In addition to Freeman, Watkins lists this nickname, as does Martin Bowman in a pictorial history of the group and it is used in the title of the website for the 493rd Bomb Group Museum at Debach Airfield. However, in an online memoir, one officer assigned to the group said, "The 493rd's nickname is said to be 'Helton's Hellcats', a name I never heard overseas." Weir, Gordon W. (August 2005). "Navigating Through World War II: A Memoir of the War Years: 493rd Bomb Group Combat Missions". Moon Handbooks: Arizona..)
- Engagements: European Theater of Operations

Insignia
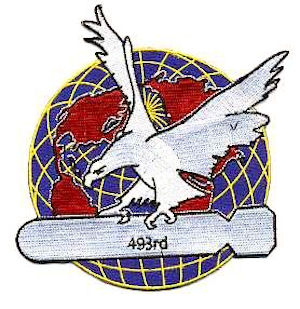
- 493d Bombardment Group emblem

The 493d Bombardment Group is a former United States Army Air Forces unit that was assigned to the 92d Bombardment Wing during World War II. It the last bombardment group to be assigned to Eighth Air Force. It flew combat missions in the strategic bombing campaign against Germany until shortly before V-E Day, then returned to the United States for inactivation. In 2002, the group was converted to provisional status as the 493d Air Expeditionary Group and assigned to Air Mobility Command to activate or inactivate as needed.

== History ==
=== World War II ===
==== Initial activation and training in the United States ====
The 493d Bombardment Group was first activated at McCook Army Air Field, Nebraska, with the 860th, 861st, 862d and 863d Bombardment Squadrons assigned. The 863d Squadron was a former antisubmarine unit that had become surplus when the Navy assumed its mission, and was used to form the cadre for the group and its squadrons. The group's formation was delayed by an administrative error that caused some of the unit's personnel to report to Davis-Monthan Field, Arizona instead of to McCook. It was not until January that all personnel were at McCook. By this time, the group had transferred on paper to Elveden Hall, England. The ground personnel of the group in the United States had been used to form Boeing B-29 Superfortress units being activated by Second Air Force, while the group's air echelon remained in Nebraska to conduct training on their assigned Consolidated B-24 Liberators. Meanwhile, Eighth Air Force formed a new ground echelon for the group in England from other units assigned to the 3d Bombardment Division. This ground echelon moved to the group's combat station, RAF Debach, in April 1944. Additional officers and men, chiefly from the 34th Bombardment Group training at Blythe Army Air Base, California, were assigned to the Group in February and March. The group's air echelon departed for England via the northern ferry route on 1 May, while a small ground component left McCook and sailed from Boston, Massachusetts on the SS Brazil (1928) on 12 May 1944.

==== Combat in Europe ====
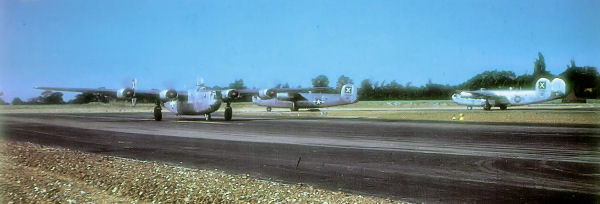
B-24s of the 493d Bomb Group at Debach

The group was established at Debach by mid-May and flew its first combat mission on D-Day, 6 June 1944, making it the last in Eighth Air Force to become operational. It continued to fly Liberators until 24 August 1944, when it was withdrawn from combat to convert to Boeing B-17 Flying Fortresses, along with other units of the 93d Bombardment Wing, as Eighth Air Force concentrated all its Liberators in the 2d Bombardment Division. It resumed combat missions with the B-17 on 8 September 1944. The squadron concentrated its attacks on military and industrial targets in Germany, attacking an ordnance depot in Magdeburg, factories near Frankfurt, and a synthetic oil manufacturing plant at Merseburg. It also attacked lines of communications, including a railroad tunnel at Ahrweiler, bridges at Irlich, and marshalling yards near Cologne.

The group was occasionally diverted from the strategic bombing campaign to attack tactical targets. It supported Operation Overlord, the Normandy invasion, striking artillery batteries, airfields and bridges. It struck enemy ground forces south of Caen and during Operation Cobra, the breakout at St Lo. It bombed German fortifications to support Operation Market Garden, airborne attacks attempting to secure a bridgehead across the Rhine in the Netherlands, and attacked communications during the Battle of the Bulge. Toward the end of the war, it also supported Operation Varsity, the airborne assault across the Rhine in Germany.

In February 1945, the 862d Squadron replaced the 3d Scouting Force, and its crews were distributed to the other squadrons of the group. The squadron returned to group control in May. The squadron flew its last combat mission against marshalling yards near Nauen on 20 April 1945, although it flew food-dropping missions in early May, dropping more than 450 tons of supplies. At war's end, the 493d had flown 47 Missions with the Liberator and 110 with the Flying Fortress. It claimed the destruction of 11 enemy aircraft, but lost 41 in combat. The squadron air echelon departed Debach on 30 June, while the ground echelon sailed for home aboard the RMS Queen Elizabeth on 6 August 1945. In late August, the group assembled at Sioux Falls Army Air Field, South Dakota, where it was inactivated on 28 August 1945.

=== Expeditionary unit ===
In June 2002, the group was converted to provisional status as the 493d Air Expeditionary Group and assigned to Air Mobility Command to activate or inactivate as needed for contingency operations. There is no indication in unclassified sources that the unit has been active.

== Lineage ==
- Constituted as the 493d Bombardment Group, Heavy on 14 September 1943

Activated on 1 November 1943
Inactivated on 28 August 1945

- Redesignated 493d Air Expeditionary Group and converted to provisional status on 12 June 2002

=== Assignments ===
- Second Air Force, 1 November 1943
- Eighth Air Force, 1 January 1944
- 93d Combat Bombardment Wing, c. 17 April 1944
- 13th Combat Bombardment Wing (later 13th Bombardment Wing), c. March–c. 12 August 1945
- Second Air Force, 12–28 August 1945
- Air Mobility Command to activate or inactivate as needed, 12 June 2002

=== Components ===
- 860th Bombardment Squadron, 1 November 1943 – 28 August 1945
- 861st Bombardment Squadron, 1 November 1943 – 28 August 1945
- 862d Bombardment Squadron, 1 November 1943 – 28 August 1945
- 863d Bombardment Squadron, 1 November 1943 – 28 August 1945

=== Stations ===
- McCook Army Air Field, Nebraska, 1 November 1943 – 1 January 1944
- Elveden Hall (AAF-116), England, 1 January 1944
- RAF Debach (AAF-152), England, 17 April 1944 – 6 August 1945
- Sioux Falls Army Air Field, South Dakota, c. 13–28 August 1945

=== Aircraft ===
- Consolidated B-24 Liberator, 1943–1944
- Boeing B-17 Flying Fortress, 1943–1945

=== Campaigns ===
Campaign Streamer	Campaign	Dates	Notes
	Air Combat, EAME Theater	1 January 1944 – 11 May 1945	493d Bombardment Group
	Normandy	6 June 1944 – 24 July 1944	493d Bombardment Group
	Northern France	25 July 1944 – 14 September 1944	493d Bombardment Group
	Rhineland	15 September 1944 – 21 March 1945	493d Bombardment Group
	Ardennes-Alsace	16 December 1944 – 25 January 1945	493d Bombardment Group
	Central Europe	22 March 1944 – 21 May 1945	493d Bombardment Group
