= 3rd Air Division =

Inactive United States Air Force organization

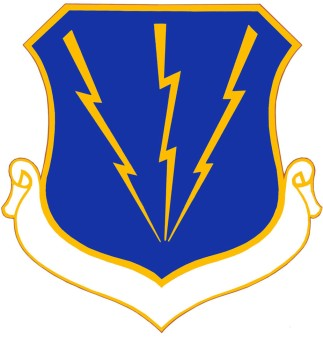
- 3rd Air Division emblem
- Active: 30 August 1943 – 21 November 1945; 23 August 1948 – 1 May 1951; 8 October 1953 – 1 March 1954; 8 June 1954 – 1 April 1970; 1 January 1975 – 1 April 1992
- Country: United States
- Branch: United States Air Force
- Garrison/HQ: see "Stations" section below
- Equipment: see "Aircraft" section below
- Engagements: : World War II; European Campaign (1942–1945): Vietnam Service (1965–1993)

Commanders
- Notable commanders: Major General Earle E. Partridge

The 3rd Air Division (3d AD) is an inactive United States Air Force organization. Its last assignment was with Strategic Air Command, assigned to Fifteenth Air Force, being stationed at Hickam AFB, Hawaii. It was inactivated on 1 April 1992.

The 3rd Air Division was created in England during World War II as the 3rd Bombardment Division, an upper command echelon of the Eighth Air Force. With five combat bomb wings and 14 heavy bomber groups assigned, it was one of the two largest U.S. air combat organizations during World War II.

== World War II ==
The 3rd Air Division was activated in September 1943 as an intermediate command and control organization between command and wing levels. It was assigned to VIII Bomber Command, Eighth Air Force. The Division commanded three combat bombardment wings (4th, 13th and 45th), consisting of seven Boeing B-17 Flying Fortress bomb groups. (Note: Each group was made up of three squadrons of aircraft) The addition of the 92nd and 93rd Combat Bomb Wings in 1944 and additional bomb groups to the other wings increased the number of combat groups to fourteen. Between May 1944 and September 1944 the division operated both B-17 Flying Fortress (nine groups) and Consolidated B-24 Liberator (five groups) aircraft, before converting to an all-B-17 organization for the remainder of the war. In September 1944 the 66th Fighter Wing was assigned directly to the division for fighter support.

The bomb groups bombed Axis targets in the European Theater of Operations (ETO). During the weeks immediately preceding the invasion of France, division aircraft bombed tactical targets such as German communications centers and lines of support, and on 6 June 1944 hit targets on the Cherbourg Peninsula immediately behind the landing beaches.

After V-E Day, the 3rd Air Division briefly became part of the United States Air Forces in Europe. As former Eighth Air Force units were withdrawn from Europe and returned to the United States during the summer and fall of 1945, the Division was assigned to VIII Fighter Command and controlled a mixture of bombardment and fighter groups before itself being inactivated on 21 November 1945.

== In Europe from 1948 ==
In August 1948, in response to the Berlin Blockade, the U.S. deployed long-range Boeing B-29 Superfortress strategic bombers to four English East Anglian bases. The 3rd Air Division (Provisional) was activated as part of United States Air Forces in Europe to receive, support and operationally control the B-29 units deployed for training. At this time these units were only expected to take part in 30- to 60-day temporary duty cycles. It was formed at RAF Marham in Norfolk, and on 23 August 1948, the provisional title was dropped, and on 8 September the headquarters moved into quarters at Bushy Park in London and remained there until April 1949 when it moved to the Victoria Park Estate, South Ruislip.

It also provided aircraft maintenance support at RAF Burtonwood (Cheshire) for Douglas C-54 Skymaster aircraft used in the Berlin Airlift.

It was briefly elevated to the Major Command level from 3 January 1949 – 21 January 1951. When the Berlin Airlift ended in 1949, the division participated in the Military Assistance Program in England and began an extensive air base construction program through May 1951 and a large number of USAF organizations based in the United Kingdom.

With the advent of the Korean War and the growing Cold War threat of the Soviet Union, the U.S. and UK agreed to an even greater U.S. military presence in the United Kingdom. The resulting growing size and complexity of the American military presence required a larger command and organizational structure, that could meet the needs of the increased operations.

The 3rd Air Division was inactivated on 1 May 1951. In its place United States Air Forces Europe activated Third Air Force to command its units in the United Kingdom. Strategic Air Command (SAC) had activated the 7th Air Division a few days earlier to control its forces deployed in Europe. SAC's intent in activating a separate headquarters was to maintain control of these forces by keeping them out of the control of the theater commander and avoid what it regarded as the misuse of its forces in the Korean War, in which its bombers had been kept from striking strategic targets by the theater commander.

== In the Pacific from 1954 ==
The 3rd Air Division was activated again at Andersen Air Force Base, Guam in June 1954 as the headquarters for all SAC units in the Pacific. The division replaced the Far East Air Forces Bomber Command (Provisional), which was simultaneously discontinued at Yokota Air Base, Japan. In addition to the strategic bomber force, the division exercised operational control over numerous deployed tactical components, and all Strategic Air Command (SAC) operations in the region came under its jurisdiction. It also supported air refueling needs of all United States military agencies operating in or transiting the region.

In mid-1958, the deployment of entire SAC wings to Guam was replaced by an "Air Mail" alert program, whereby several Boeing B-47 Stratojet wings in the U.S. maintained a specific number of B-47s and KC-97s at Andersen AFB to meet both routine and alert requirements.

In April 1964, the division switched from "Air Mail" B-47 / KC-97 to B-52 / KC-135 alert forces, again with aircraft and crews furnished in deployed status from U.S. based SAC wings. In 1965, it became heavily involved in Arc Light and Young Tiger operations in the Far East and SE Asia (SEA). Strategic Air Command wings in the U.S. furnished the aircrews and aircraft for these operations. The first elements of the 3rd Air Division to enter combat in SEA were the tanker forces under Young Tiger. In June 1965, Arc Light B-52s struck suspected Viet Cong targets in South Vietnam, commencing the first SAC combat missions. B-52s began striking targets in North Vietnam on 11 April 1966; the initial attack against the Mu Gia Pass marked the largest single bomber raid since World War II. By late 1969, most Arc Light operations staged from U-Tapao Royal Thai Navy Airfield, Thailand, while others were mounted from Kadena Air Base, Okinawa and Andersen. Andersen AFB remained the primary base for SAC deployed forces from the U.S., however, and aircraft and crews were sent from Guam to Kadena and U Tapao for combat missions.

On 1 April 1970 the 3rd Air Division's resources passed to the Eighth Air Force. Effective 1 January 1975, 3rd Air Division again controlled all SAC operations in the Western Pacific, Far East, and Southeast Asia. Additionally, it assumed responsibility for air refueling support of all U.S. military forces in these areas. During Persian Gulf operations in late 1990 through early 1991, it tasked and supported numerous sorties supporting the deployment in the Pacific Area of Responsibility (AOR).

== Lineage ==
- Established as 3rd Bombardment Division on 30 August 1943

Activated on 13 September 1943
Redesignated 3rd Air Division on 1 January 1945
Inactivated on 21 November 1945
Organized on 23 August 1948
Discontinued on 1 May 1951

- Redesignated 3rd Air Division (Operational) on 8 October 1953

Activated on 25 October 1953
Inactivated on 1 March 1954

- Redesignated 3rd Air Division on 8 June 1954

Activated on 18 June 1954
Inactivated on 1 April 1970

- Activated on 1 January 1975

Inactivated on 1 April 1992

=== Assignments ===
- VIII Bomber Command (later, Eighth Air Force), 13 September 1943
- VIII Fighter Command, 16 July – 21 November 1945
- United States Air Forces in Europe, 23 August 1948
- United States Air Force, 3 January 1949
- United States Air Forces in Europe, 21 January – 1 May 1951, 25 October 1953 – 1 March 1954
- Strategic Air Command, 18 June 1954 – 1 April 1970, 1 January 1975
- Fifteenth Air Force, 31 January 1982 – 1 April 1992

=== Components ===
==== Wings ====
- VIII Bomber Command

4th Combat Bombardment: 13 September 1943 – 18 June 1945
4th Bombardment (Provisional): 18 November 1944 – 10 February 1945
13th Combat Bombardment (later, 13th Bombardment): 13 September 1943 – c. 6 August 1945
45th Combat Bombardment: 13 September 1943 – 18 June 1945
92nd Combat Bombardment: 31 March 1944 – c. 13 June 1945
93rd Combat Bombardment: 10 January 1944 – c. 13 July 1945
401st Provisional Combat, Bombardment: 13–14 September 1943
402nd Provisional Combat, Bombardment: 13–14 September 1943
403rd Provisional Combat, Bombardment: 13–14 September 1943

- VIII Fighter Command

1st Bombardment: 12 August – c. 26 August 1945
2nd Bombardment: 12 August – c. 25 August 1945
14th Bombardment: 16 June – 26 August 1945
20th Bombardment: 16 June – c. 6 August 1945
65th Fighter: 1 June – 1 November 1945
66th Fighter: 15 September 1944 – 1 November 1945
67th Fighter: 12 August – 1 November 1945

- Eighth Air Force

307th Strategic: 1 January – 30 September 1975
376th Strategic: 1 January 1975 – 30 October 1991

- Fifteenth Air Force

6th Bombardment: 9 August 1990 – 1 April 1992

Temporary attached Air Mail/Reflex units not listed. Check AFHRA link for details.

==== Groups ====
- VIII Bomber command

385 Bombardment: 13–14 September 1943
388 Bombardment: 13–14 September 1943
390 Bombardment: 13–14 September 1943
94 Bombardment: 13–14 September 1943 - 18 June – 12 August 1945; 28 September – 1 November 1945
95 Bombardment: 13–14 September 1943
96 Bombardment: 13–14 September 1943 - 18–12 August 1945; 28 September – 1 November 1945
100 Bombardment: 13–14 September 1943 - 18 June – 12 August 1945; 28 September – 1 November 1945
493 Bombardment: 1–10 January 1944

- VIII Fighter Command

4 Fighter: 16 October – 1 November 1945
339 Fighter: 14 April – c. 6 August 1944
355 Fighter: 16 July – October 1945
479 Fighter: 16 July – October 1945
420 Air Service, RAF Framlingham: 15 April - 25 July 1945

- United States Air Forces in Europe

2 Bombardment: attached 23 August – 17 November 1948; attached 21 February – c. 15 May 1950
22 Bombardment: attached 19 November 1948 – 14 February 1949; attached 17 November 1949 – 17 February 1950
28 Bombardment: attached 23 August – 18 October 1948
43 Bombardment: attached 20 August – 18 November 1949
92 Bombardment: attached 6 February – 6 May 1949
97 Bombardment: attached 4 November 1948 – 15 February 1949; July 1950 – February 1951
98 Bombardment: attached 18 May – 18 August 1949
301 Bombardment: attached 19 October 1948 – 17 January 1949; attached 19 May – c. 3 July 1950
307 Bombardment: attached 23 August – 4 November 1948; attached 15 February – 30 April 1949
509 Bombardment: attached 4 May – 30 August 1949

20 Fighter Bomber: attached 20 July – 10 December 1950

==== Squadrons ====
- VIII Fighter Command

36 Bombardment: 12 August – 1 September 1945
652 Bombardment (Weather Reconnaissance): 25 August – 1 September 1945; 12 October – 1 November 1945.
653 Bombardment (Weather Reconnaissance): 12 October – 1 November 1945.
862 Bombardment: attached 17 February – 7 May 1945.
418th Bombardment Squadron: attached 7 April 1944 – 31 December 1945.

- United States Air Forces in Europe

2 Air Refueling: attached 6 April – c. 15 May 1950
23 Strategic Reconnaissance: attached 22 December 1949 – 6 March 1950
72 Strategic Reconnaissance: attached 1 June – 15 November 1950
301 Air Refueling: attached 19 May – c. 3 July 1950.

- Fifteenth Air Force

82 Strategic Reconnaissance: 25 August 1967 – 2 January 1968

=== Stations ===
- Camp Blainey, England, 13 September 1943
- RAF Honington, England, c. 27 October – 21 November 1945
- RAF Marham, England, 23 August 1948
- Bushy Park, England, 8 September 1948
- Victoria Park Estate (later, USAF Station), South Ruislip, England, 15 April 1949 – 1 May 1951
- Wiesbaden AB, West Germany, 25 October 1953 – 1 March 1954
- Andersen AFB, Guam, 18 June 1954 – 1 April 1970; 1 January 1975 – 12 September 1988
- Hickam AFB, Hawaii, 12 September 1988 – 1 April 1992.

=== Aircraft ===
==== World War II ====
- B-17 Flying Fortress 1943–1945;
- B-24 Liberator 1944;
- Republic P-47 Thunderbolt 1944–1945; fighter
- North American P-51 Mustang 1944–1945. fighter

==== Strategic Air Command ====
- Boeing B-50 Superfortress 1954;
- Convair B-36 Peacemaker 1954–1955 1955–1956;
- Convair RB-36 {reconnaissance} 1955;
- Boeing B-47 Stratojet 1955 1956–1964;
- Boeing B-52 Stratofortress 1964–1970;
- Boeing KC-97 Stratofreighter 1957 – c. 1965;
- Boeing KC-135 Stratotanker 1965–1970.
- Boeing B-52 Stratofortress 1975–1992;
- McDonnell Douglas KC-10 Extender (tankers in TDY status) 1986–1988;
- KC-135 Stratotanker 1975–1992;
- Boeing RC-135 Rivet Joint 1975–1992. reconnaissance

== See also ==
- First Air Force
- List of United States Air Force air divisions
