= 102d Security Forces Squadron =

- Country: United States
- Allegiance: United States; Massachusetts
- Branch: United States Air Force; Air National Guard
- Role: Military police Air force infantry
- Size: Squadron
- Garrison/HQ: Otis Air National Guard Base
- Motto(s): First to Defend
- Engagements: Cold War; Operation Southern Watch; Operation Iraqi Freedom; Operation Enduring Freedom

The 102d Security Forces Squadron (102 SFS) is a unit of the 102d Intelligence Wing, Massachusetts Air National Guard, at Otis Air National Guard Base, Joint Base Cape Cod, Massachusetts. If activated to federal service, the squadron is gained by the United States Air Force.

As an Air National Guard unit, the 102d Security Forces Squadron is not in the normal United States Air Force chain of command and is under the jurisdiction of the Massachusetts Air National Guard unless activated to federal service by order of the President of the United States.

== See also ==
- United States Air Force Security Forces
- Massachusetts Air National Guard
