= Barnstable County (disambiguation) =

Barnstable County typically refers to Barnstable County, Massachusetts, located in the U.S. state of Massachusetts.

Barnstable County may also refer to:

- Barnstable County Courthouse, a historic courthouse
- Barnstable County Jail and House of Correction, the former county jail for Barnstable County
- Barnstable County Correctional Facility, the current county jail for Barnstable County
- Barnstable County Hospital, a former hospital
- USS Barnstable County (LST-1197), a Newport class tank landing ship
