= Dighton-Rehoboth Regional High School =

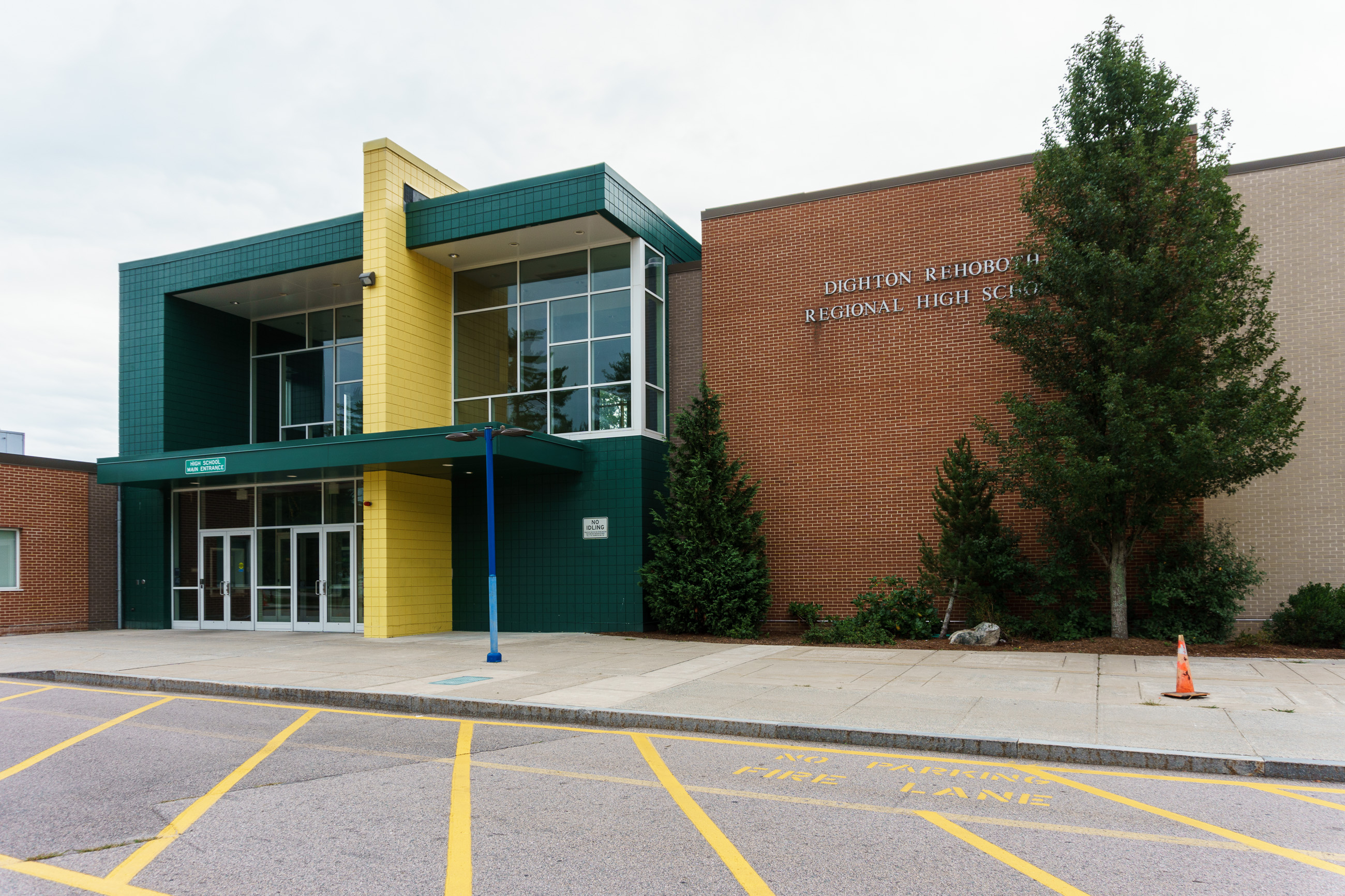

Location
- 2700 Regional Rd. North Dighton, Massachusetts 02764; United States; 41°51′09″N 71°11′46″W

Information
- Type: High school Open enrollment
- Motto: We Are DR
- Established: 1961
- School district: Dighton-Rehoboth Regional School District
- NCES District ID: 2504200
- Superintendent: William Runey
- CEEB code: 221645
- NCES School ID: 250420000568
- Principal: Dustin Demers
- Teaching staff: 58.66 (FTE)
- Grades: 9–12
- Enrollment: 650 (2023-2024)
- Student to teacher ratio: 11.08
- Colors: Green and Gold
- Mascot: Falcon
- Rival: Seekonk High School
- Newspaper: Falcon Flyer
- Budget: $40,090,520 total $13,694 per pupil (2016)
- Communities served: Dighton, Rehoboth
- Website: drhs.drregional.org/o/drhs

Dighton-Rehoboth Regional High School is a high school in North Dighton, Massachusetts, United States. it is part of the Dighton-Rehoboth School District which also serves the neighboring town, Rehoboth, Massachusetts. It was founded in 1961.

The school educates students in 9th through 12th grades. Student enrollment is approximately 650. It has over 85 educators and a student-to-teacher ratio of 14 to 1.

== School facilities ==
The school has a library, a yearbook, and an on-site nurse.

It features both academic and vocational curricula, as well as enrichment in music (such as choir and band) and other arts and special education. Academic coursework focuses on language arts, mathematics, science and social studies as well as Latin, Spanish, and Portuguese for foreign languages. Other courses at the school focus on current events, and technology.

== Extracurricular activities ==
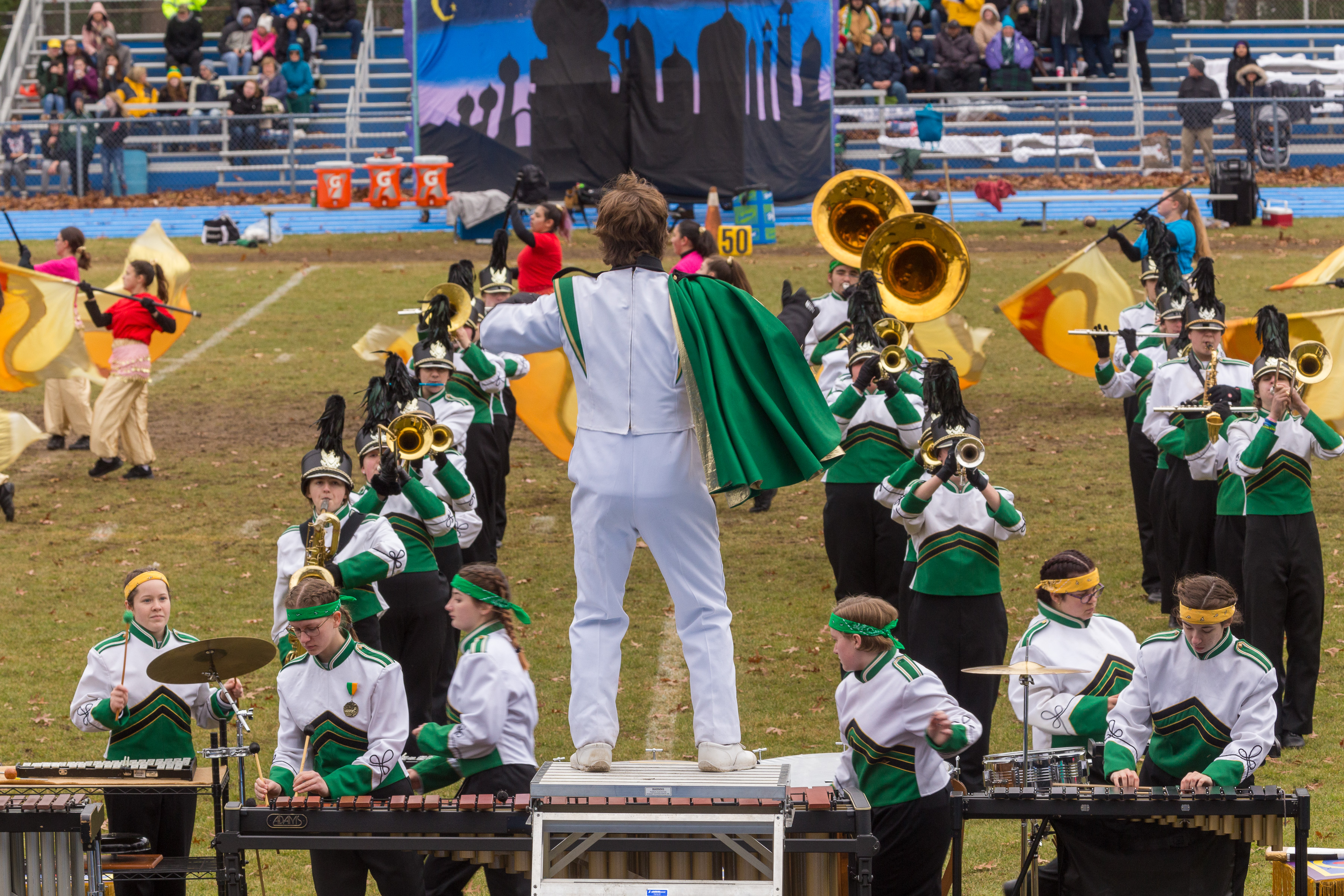
Marching band

Extracurricular activities and clubs at the school include:

- Mock Trial – which has come in the top sixteen for the state four years running
- The DRRHS Theatre Company – The Company is a Premiere Community for Theatre Education as accredited by the EdTA. DRRHS was one of only 15 schools nationwide in 2022 recognized for providing exceptional, high-quality theatre education, investing in resources, and supporting student growth through the arts. This first 3-year recognition was just renewed until 2029.
- Student Government – which oversees many student outreach programs and events, including Prom
- National Honor Society
- Environmental Club
- A large Leo Club presence
- DECA – prepares emerging leaders and entrepreneurs in marketing, finance, hospitality and management in high schools and colleges around the globe.
- Dighton-Rehoboth Marching Band – The band has made numerous trips to Disney World to perform for crowds of thousands on Main Street of the Magic Kingdom. The DRMB has had the honoring of performing for 94 HJY, the Taunton Christmas Parade, and represented the state of Massachusetts in the National Fourth of July Parade in Washington D.C. in 2014.
- Gender Alliance Club and a self-care club

as well as many other clubs and organizations.

== Incidents ==
=== Live ammunition ===
On June 8, 2022, a student found live ammunition inside the men's student bathroom. The school went into lockdown shortly after the discovery. The school was searched, and it was declared that there was no credible threat. Roughly two minutes later, a faulty smoke detector sounded off the fire alarm and all students were safely evacuated from the building. A day earlier, graffiti with a threatening message was found in that same bathroom.

== Notable alumni ==
- Rod Correia, former MLB player for the California Angels
- Jack Teixeira, former airman in the 102nd Intelligence Wing of the Massachusetts Air National Guard. He was arrest in 2023 for leaking hundreds of highly classified Pentagon documents on Discord, later was sentenced to 16 years and 8 months in prison. His actions led to 15 other airmen to be disciplined by the Air Force.
