= 67th Fighter Wing =

Unit of the United States Air Force

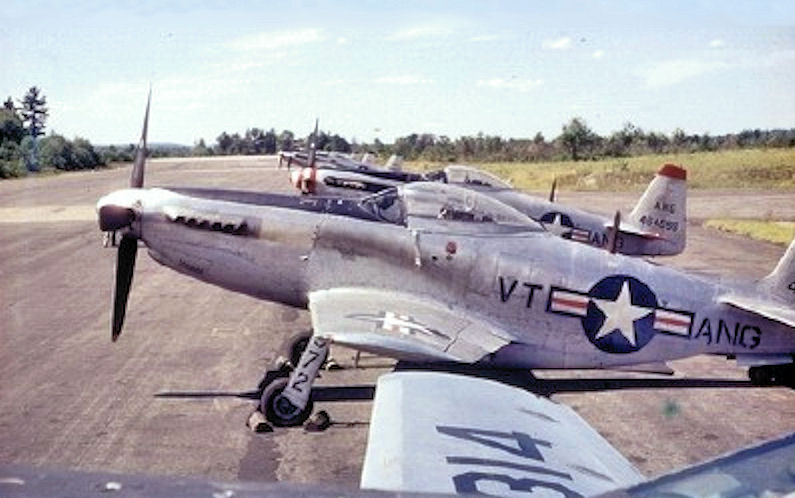
- Vermont Air National Guard 134th Fighter Squadron F-51H Mustangs, Burlington International Airport, 1950.
- Active: 1943–1945; 1946-1950
- Country: United States
- Branch: United States Air National Guard
- Type: Wing
- Role: Airspace Defense
- Size: Wing
- Part of: Air Defense Command/Massachusetts Air National Guard
- Garrison/HQ: Logan International Airport

The 67th Fighter Wing was a unit of the United States Air Force for four years, between 1946 and 1950. It was located at Logan Airport in Boston, Massachusetts. It is unrelated to the modern 67th Network Warfare Wing.

== History ==
=== World War II ===
The 6th Air Defense Wing was organized as a command and control organization for Eighth Air Force. Deployed to England in July 1943 and initially was used to organize air defense units. Transferred to VIII Fighter Command and controlled fighter-escort groups for 1st Bombardment Division B-17 Flying Fortress units engaged in strategic bombardment of enemy targets in Occupied Europe and Nazi Germany. Inactivated in November 1945.

=== Post war ===
After the war, the 67th Fighter Wing was activated at Logan Airport in Boston, Massachusetts. The National Guard Bureau began a major expansion of its air units. Massachusetts was allotted the 67th, which consisted of the 101st Fighter Squadron, the 131st Fighter Squadron, the 132nd Fighter Squadron, the 202nd Air Service Group, 601st Signal Construction Company, 101st Communications Squadron, 101st Air Control Squadron, 151st Air Control and Warning Group, 567th Air Force Band, 101st Weather Flight and the 1801st Aviation Engineer Company. The 67th Fighter Wing was assigned to Air Defense Command. The wing was Extended federal recognition and activated on 15 October 1946.

At the end of October 1950, the Air National Guard converted to the wing-base Hobson Plan organization. As a result, the wing was withdrawn from the Massachusetts ANG and was inactivated on 31 October 1950. The 102d Fighter Wing was established by the National Guard Bureau, allocated to the commonwealth of Massachusetts, recognized and activated 1 November 1950; assuming the personnel, equipment and mission of the inactivated 67th Fighter Wing.

== Assignments ==
=== Major Command/Gaining Command ===
- Eighth Air Force, 15 June 1943
- VIII Fighter Command, 26 August 1943 – 21 November 1945
- Air National Guard/Continental Air Command (1946–1950)
- Massachusetts Air National Guard, 15 October 1946 – 31 October 1950

== Previous designations ==
- Constituted as 6th Air Defense Wing on 14 June 1943

Activated on 15 June 1943
Re-designated 67th Fighter Wing in July 1943
Inactivated on 21 November 1945.

- Allotted to the Massachusetts ANG on 24 May 1946

Extended federal recognition and activated on 15 October 1946
Inactivated, and returned to the control of the Department of the Air Force, on 31 October 1950

- Disbanded on 15 June 1983

== Units assigned ==
=== Components ===
==== World War II ====
- 20th Fighter Group: 26 August 1943 – 11 October 1945
- 352d Fighter Group: 7 July 1943 – 27 January 1945
- 356th Fighter Group: 5 October 1943 – 4 November 1945
- 359th Fighter Group: October 1943 – November 1945
- 364th Fighter Group: February 1944 – November 1945

==== Air National Guard ====
- 102nd Fighter Group 22 October 1946 – 31 October 1950
  - 101st Fighter Squadron
    - 101st Communications Squadron
    - 101st Air Control Squadron
    - 101st Weather Flight
- 104th Fighter Group
  - 131st Fighter Squadron
- 101st Fighter Group 4 April 1947 – 31 October 1950 (Maine ANG)
  - 132nd Fighter Squadron
- 202nd Air Service Group
- 601st Signal Construction Company
- 151st Air Control and Warning Group
- 567th Air Force Band
- 1801st Aviation Engineer Company

== Bases stationed ==
- Bedford Army Air Base, Massachusetts, 15 June – 4 August 1943
- Walcot Hall (AAF-372), England, c. 26 August 1943
- RAF Troston (AAF-595), England, c. 25 October – 21 November 1945.
- Logan Airport, Boston, Massachusetts, 15 October 1946 – 31 October 1950

== Aircraft operated ==
- P-51D Mustang (1950)
- P-80C Shooting Star (1948–1950)
- P-47D Thunderbolt (1947–1948)
