= Cape Cod Air Show & Open House =

Airshow in Falmouth, Massachusetts, US

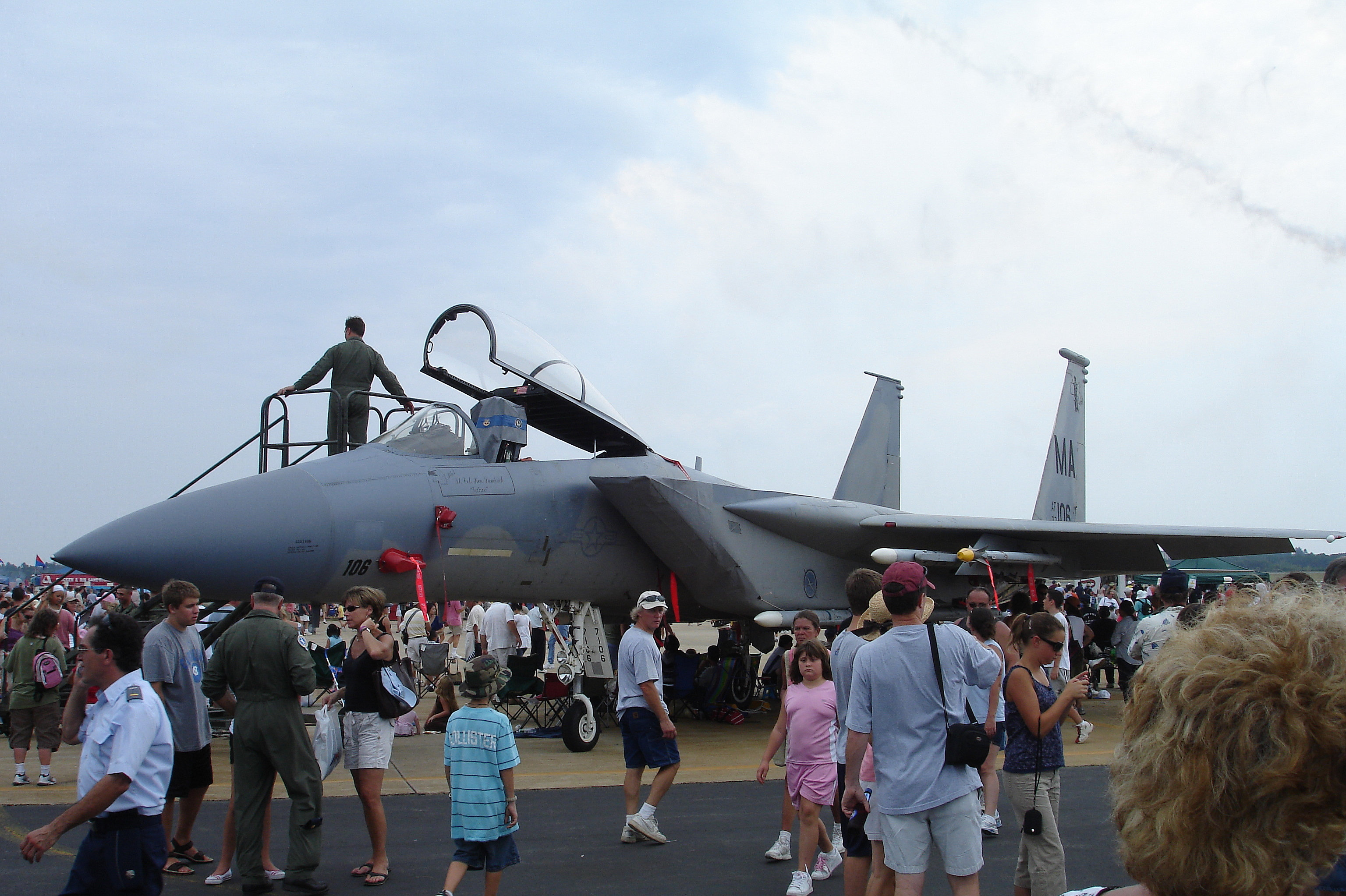
- F-15 From 101st Fighter Squadron during the 2007 Cape Cod Air Show
- Genre: Air show
- Venue: Otis Air National Guard Base
- Location: Bourne, Massachusetts
- Coordinates: 41°39′34.63″N 070°31′55″W
- Country: United States
- Organizer: 102nd Fighter Wing
- Website: The Great Cape Cod Air Show

The Cape Cod Airshow & Open House was an airshow held in August of every odd numbered year at Otis Air National Guard Base in Falmouth, Massachusetts. It most recently was run in 2007 after a six-year hiatus. The show in 2003 was canceled because of Operation Iraqi Freedom and the show in 2005 was canceled for unknown reasons. The most recent show exhibited the 101st Air Refueling Wing, the 102nd Fighter Wing, the 103rd Fighter Wing, the 104th Fighter Wing, and various other aircraft from the United States and Canada. The United States Air Force Thunderbirds performed as well. The show was usually attended by several hundred thousand spectators.

The next Cape Cod Air Show & Open House was scheduled for September 4 & 5, 2021, but has been cancelled. The Blue Angels were scheduled to perform on those dates. airshownetwork.com
