= Massachusetts Military Reservation Wind Project =

Wind turbines

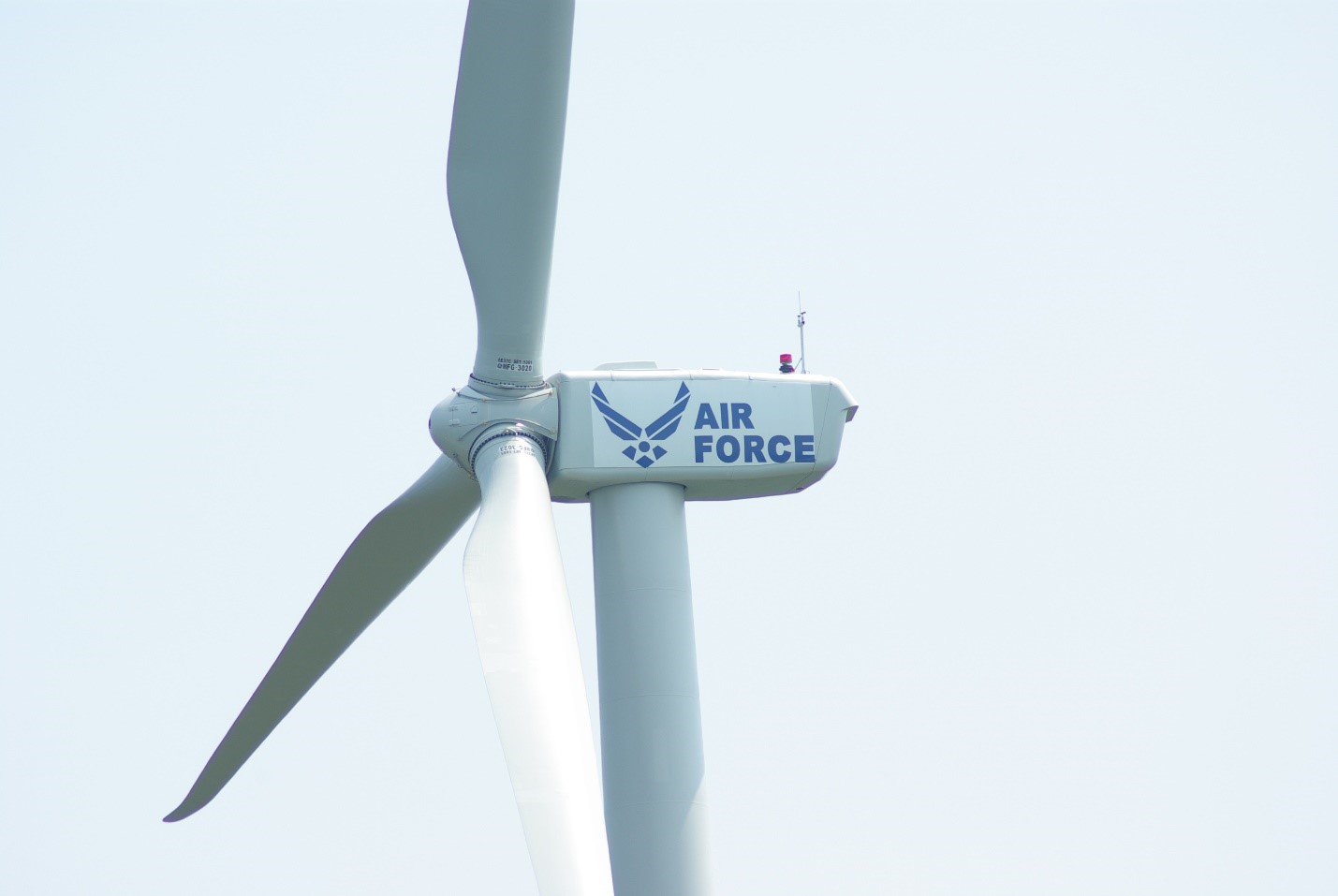
- Close Up Picture of One of the Wind Turbines for the MMR Wind Project
- Country: United States
- Location: Cape Cod, Barnstable County, Massachusetts
- Coordinates: 41°42′00″N 70°18′00″W
- Commission date: 2009; 16 years ago
- Owner: US Air Force

Power generation
- Units operational: 3
- Nameplate capacity: 4.5 MW

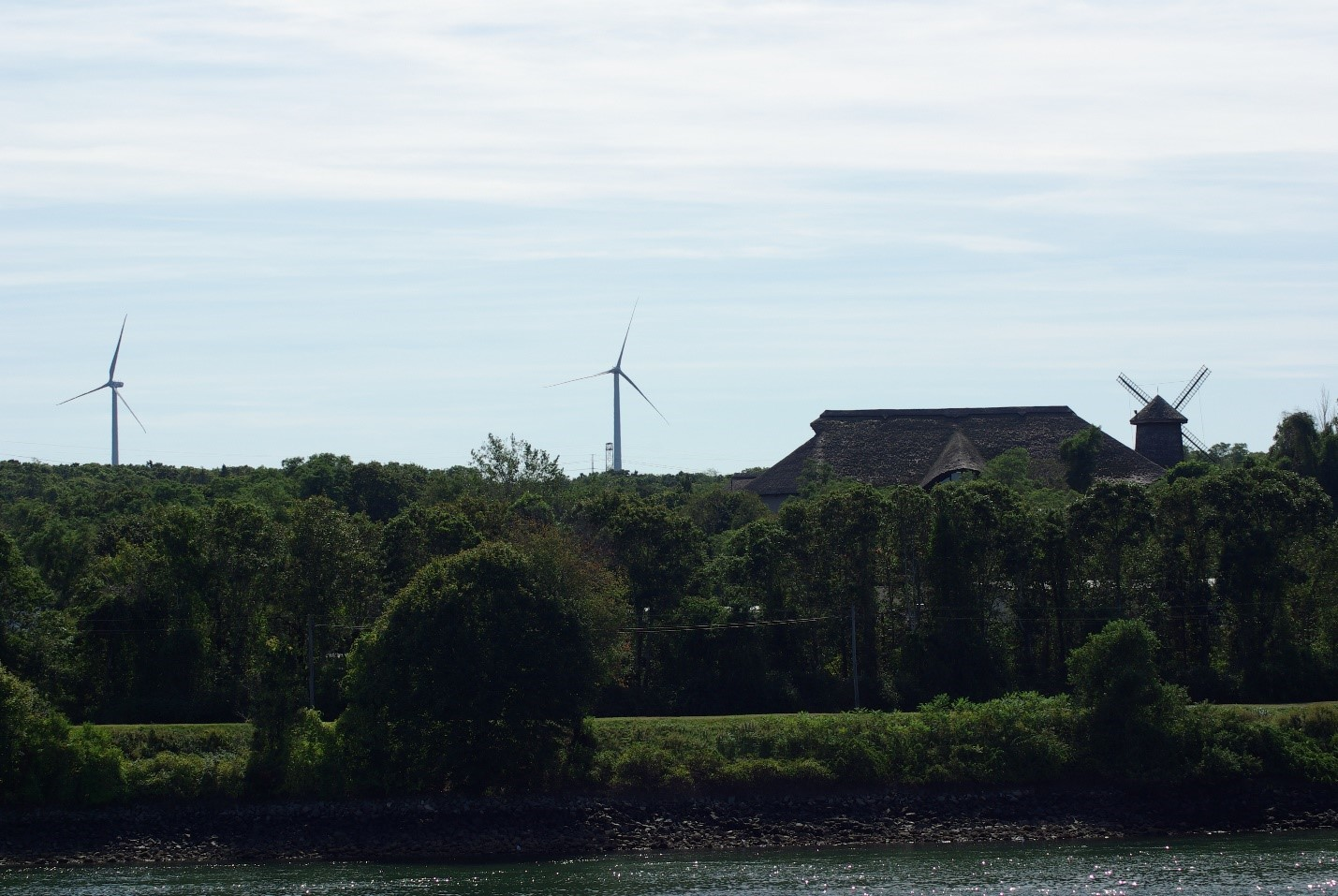
The completed versions of the two new General Electric wind turbines for the MMR Wind Project

The Massachusetts Military Reservation Wind Project is located in Barnstable County, Massachusetts on the Massachusetts Military Reservation (MMR), also known as the Joint Base Cape Cod. This Wind Project currently consists of one wind turbine, built in 2009, and two others recently completed in 2011. The first turbine was a Fuhrländer 1500/77 wind turbine with an 80-meter (260 ft) tower and a 77-meter (253 ft) rotor diameter. The two completed in 2011 were General Electric wind turbines. Each of these GE 1.5-77 wind turbines outputs 1.5 MW of power on top of an 80-meter (260 ft) tall tower. Therefore, the total net capacity for the MMR Wind project is approximately 4.5 MW. Clearance may soon become available to build more turbines. (See the “New Turbines” section below for more information). The contracting company hired to build all three of the turbines is called ECC Corporate, and the plant code and utility ID of the facility are 57253 and 56619, respectively.

== History ==
In 2007, the MMR created the Massachusetts Military Reservation Energy Committee to find ways of reducing the base’s carbon footprint and operational costs by using renewable energy technologies. This was largely because, in the past, the Joint Base Cape Cod has used a very large amount of “petroleum products and other hazardous materials and [disposed] of them in nearby landfills, dry wells, sumps, and a sewage treatment plant.” Recently, in 2008, treatment systems created to remedy the polluted area were reported by this committee to not only have in turn created a tremendous spike in electricity costs, but to also having caused an increase in greenhouse gas emissions due to the extra amount of fossil fuels needing to be burned for these remedial treatment plants. Therefore, the Massachusetts Military Reservation Wind Project was proposed for the government owned Joint Base Cape Cod. Once the first wind turbine was built in 2009 and the beneficial impacts on the area were proven, the contracting company that built the first turbine, ECC Corporate, was given the funds in 2010 to build two other turbines, finished in 2011. The total cost of the project was about $16.2 million. The project is still not over, however, as there is a possibility for more wind turbines to be built in the future. This possibility is expanded upon in the “New Turbines” section.

== Energy use ==
The three goals set to be accomplished by the MMR Wind Project were set by the Air Force Center for Engineering and the Environment (AFCEE). This organization aims to offset electricity costs and reduce air emissions from existing groundwater pump and treatment systems. The wind turbines would indirectly reduce the amount of greenhouse gases by cutting back on the amount of fossil fuels needed to be burned for energy by the MMR. The third goal of the MMR Wind Project is to provide energy to the on-site treatment plants needed for the cleanup process of the petroleum products and other hazardous materials created over time in the area, as explained in the “History” section.

== New turbines ==
The goal of this Project is to eventually have this military base completely powered by renewable energy. Since the most recent project of the MMR Wind Project had been completed in 2011, new designs for future wind turbines have not yet been completed or become available to the public. As a part of one of the goals meant to clean up the area, the MMR is planning on building up to twenty wind turbines in total sometime in the near future.

== See also ==
- GE Wind Energy
- wind farm
- US Air Force
