= Jack Teixeira =

American airman and leaker (born 2001)

- Born: Jack Douglas Teixeira; December 21, 2001 (age 24); Dighton, Massachusetts, US
- Known for: 2022–2023 Pentagon leaks
- Criminal status: Incarcerated at ADX Florence
- Military career
- Branch: United States Air Force; Massachusetts Air National Guard
- Service years: 2019–2025
- Rank: Airman first class
- Unit: 102nd Intelligence Wing
- Criminal information
- Motive: Social status
- Convictions: 6 counts of Willful retention of National Defense Information (pleaded guilty)
- Penalty: 15 years imprisonment

Details
- Date apprehended: April 13, 2023

Jack Douglas Teixeira (born December 21, 2001) is an American former airman in the 102nd Intelligence Wing of the Massachusetts Air National Guard. In April 2023, following an investigation into the removal and disclosure of hundreds of classified Pentagon documents, Teixeira was arrested by FBI agents and charged with unauthorized retention and transmission of national defense information in violation of the Espionage Act of 1917 and unauthorized removal and retention of classified documents or material. In March 2024, Teixeira pleaded guilty to six counts of willful retention and transmission of national defense information.

On November 12, 2024, Teixeira was sentenced to fifteen years in prison by a federal court in Massachusetts. In March 2025, he was recalled to active duty to separately face charges of violating the Uniform Code of Military Justice in a court-martial that was convened at Hanscom Air Force Base, and was dishonorably discharged.

== Early life ==
Teixeira was born in Dighton, Massachusetts, on December 21, 2001.

He graduated from Dighton-Rehoboth Regional High School in 2020, but missed his graduation ceremony to attend United States Air Force Basic Military Training at Lackland Air Force Base in Texas.

== Career ==
Upon graduating from high school, Teixeira joined the 102nd Intelligence Wing of the Massachusetts Air National Guard as a Cyber Transport Systems journeyman in September 2019. Teixeira was stationed at Otis Air National Guard Base in Cape Cod. In July 2022, Teixeira was promoted to airman first class. Many U.S. military personnel in technology or intelligence positions, even those of relatively low rank, are entrusted with access to classified information. As part of his job, Teixeira held a Top Secret security clearance. He was also the recipient of an Air Force Achievement Medal.

== Publication of leaked material ==
In early April 2023, Teixeira was alleged by media to have regularly shared classified information in a server on the online chat service Discord called "Thug Shaker Central", beginning at least by October 2022, both transcribed from documents he read and from printouts removed from his office on base. Chatroom members reportedly talked about and played video games together; according to The New York Times, Teixeira was identified as the chatroom administrator. Reports of the server's size vary, between about two dozen and about fifty members.

On February 28, 2023, a Thug Shaker Central member was alleged to have posted dozens of pictures of classified documents to another Discord server. From there, someone else alleges they posted images found on that server to a Discord server associated with the video game Minecraft. After classified documents began appearing on Russian-language Telegram channels, The New York Times first reported on the leak. On April 21, The New York Times reported that a Discord account with similar characteristics as the online profile of Teixeira had shared written summaries of classified information and likely shared photographs of documents to a Discord server with about 600 members from about February 2022 until about March 2023.

=== Arrest and prosecution ===
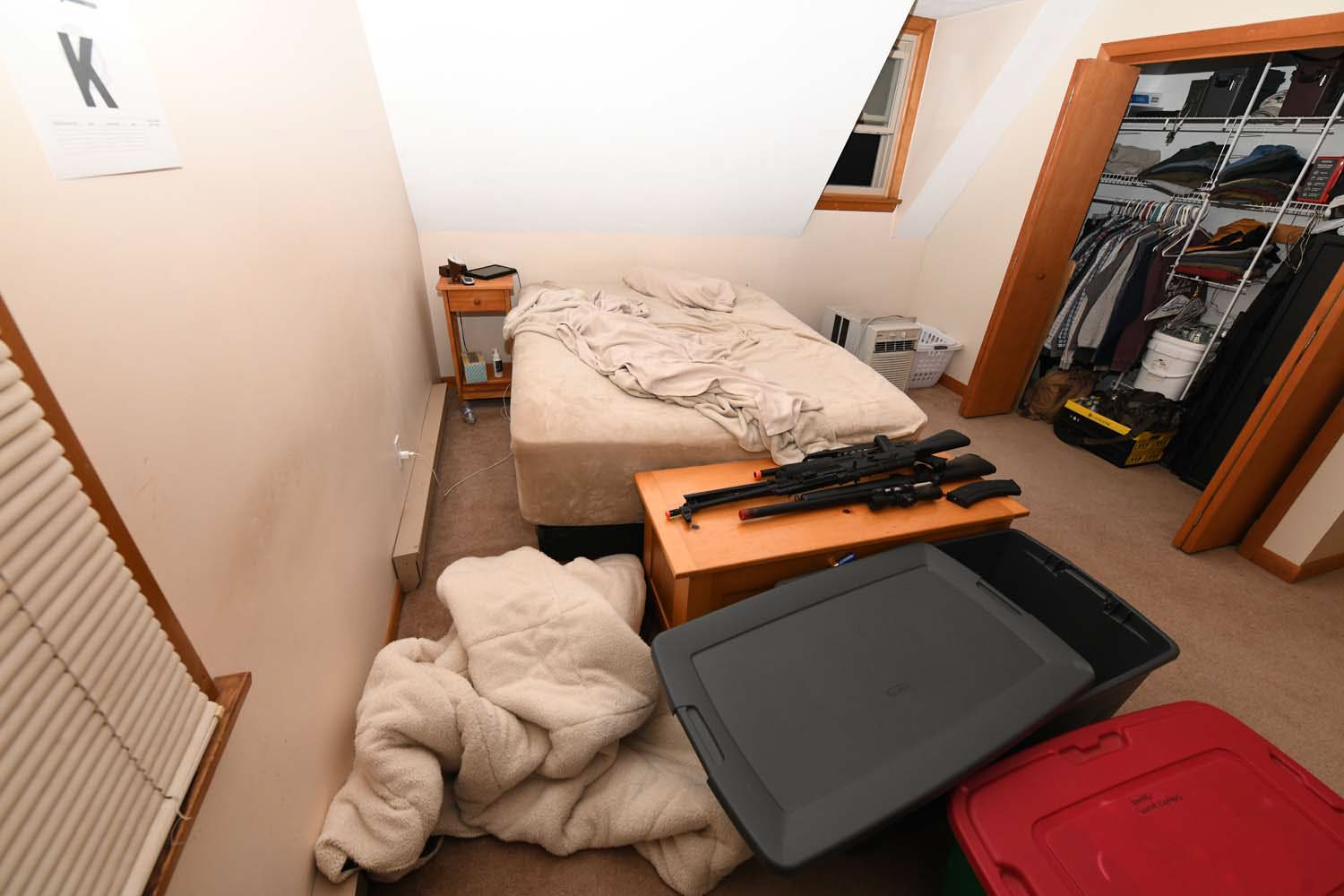
FBI photo of Teixeira's bedroom

On the morning of April 13, 2023, the Federal Bureau of Investigation (FBI) arrested Teixeira at his home in Dighton, where Teixeira lived with his mother and stepfather. Next to his bed, investigators found Teixeira's stockpile of weapons, including handguns, shotguns, bolt-action rifles, an AK-style rifle with high-capacity magazine, a gas mask, and other weapons.

The next day, Teixeira made his first appearance at the U.S. District Court in Boston before a U.S. magistrate judge, and the formal charging document was unsealed. He was charged with two offenses: (1) violating the Espionage Act of 1917 by retaining and transmitting national defense information without authorization and (2) unauthorized removal and retention of classified information. The first charge has a maximum prison sentence of ten years; the second charge, a maximum of five years. A supporting affidavit from a FBI Counterintelligence Division special agent was attached to the criminal complaint.

Teixeira is represented by counsel from the federal public defender's office, who requested and received postponement of Teixeira's detention hearing to allow more time to review the case. In advance of an April 27 detention hearing, the prosecution and defense filed memos with the court. The prosecution advocated ongoing detention without bond, arguing that Teixeira posed a "serious flight risk"; the prosecution's memo alleged Teixeira had attempted to obstruct the federal investigation by destroying evidence; might still possess secret information of "tremendous value to hostile nation states"; and had a record of making racist and violent comments, including in late 2022 and early 2023.

To support detention without bond, prosecutors also raised an incident from while Teixeira was a high school sophomore in 2018 that resulted in his suspension from school and prevented him from obtaining a gun license until he joined the National Guard. Prosecutors also alleged that Teixeira's supervisors had in September and October 2022 and January 2023 caught him taking notes on classified material or viewing material not needed for his job, and admonished him to "cease and desist". At a May 19 hearing, a judge ruled Teixeira would be held without bail until trial. On June 15, Teixeira was indicted, and he pleaded not guilty in court on June 21.

On March 4, 2024, Teixeira pleaded guilty to six counts of willful retention and transmission of national defense information. On November 12, 2024, he was sentenced to 15 years in prison. In March 2025, he pleaded guilty to military charges of obstructing justice, and was dishonorably discharged. He is currently incarcerated at ADX Florence.

== Personal life ==
Teixeira is Catholic. His stepfather is a retired master sergeant in the United States Air Force. His stepfather and stepbrother worked at Joint Base Cape Cod. His mother worked for a non-profit organization that supported military veterans.

Teixeira is of Portuguese descent; his grandfather immigrated to the United States from São Miguel Island, in the Azores.

== See also ==
- Daniel Ellsberg – American political activist (1931–2023)
- Chelsea Manning – American activist and whistleblower (born 1987)
- Edward Snowden – American whistleblower (born 1983)
- Reality Winner – American intelligence translator (born 1991)
