= 102nd Intelligence Wing =

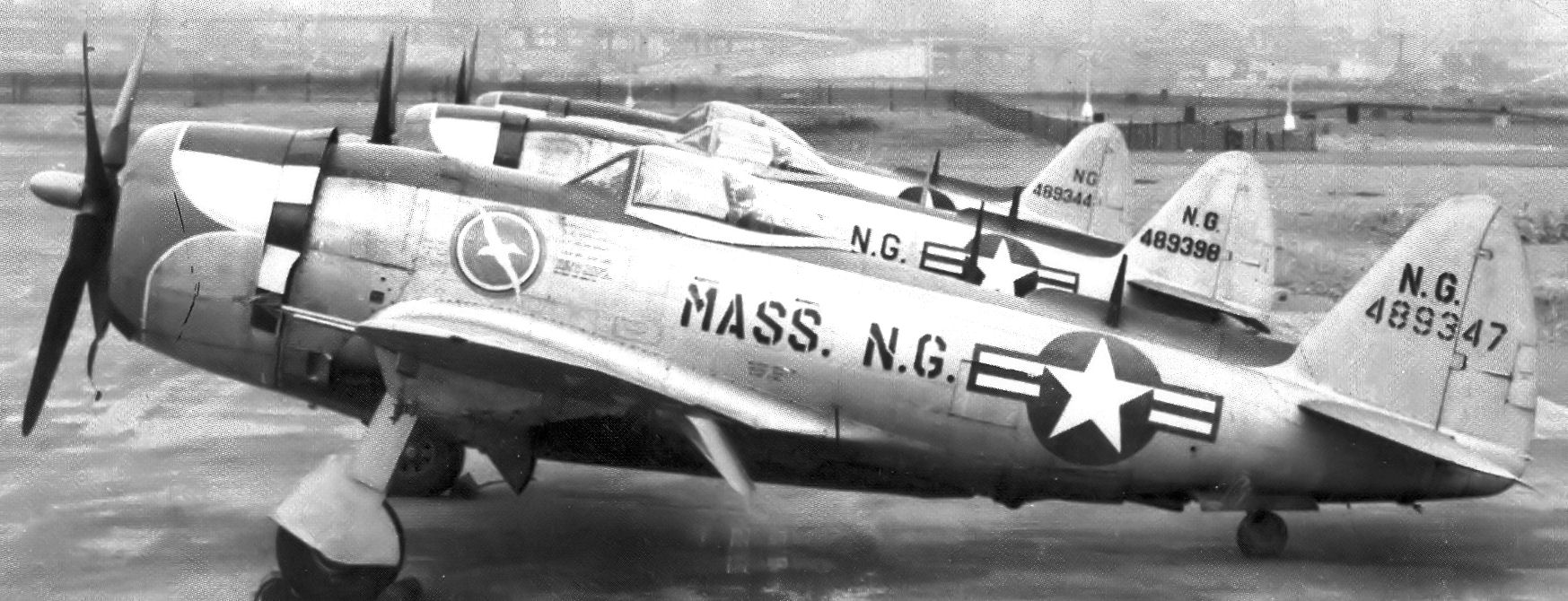
- 101st Fighter Squadron F-47N Thunderbolts Logan Airport 1946 Republic P-47N-25-RE Thunderbolt 44-89347 in foreground
- Active: 15 October 1942 – Present
- Country: United States
- Branch: Air National Guard
- Type: Wing
- Role: Ground-based distributed radar installation
- Size: 950 members: 80 officers 745 enlisted personnel
- Part of: Massachusetts Air National Guard
- Garrison/HQ: Otis Air National Guard Base, Mashpee, Massachusetts
- Nicknames: "Eagle Keepers" "Bear Chasers"
- Motto: Omnis Vir Tigris (Latin for 'Every Man a Tiger')
- Equipment: Distributed Common Ground Systems; Air Operations Center
- Engagements: World War II; Cold War; Operation Noble Eagle
- Decorations: Air Force Outstanding Unit Award Personnel Center Awards Search (Post-1991)

Commanders
- Commander: Colonel Wendy Armijo
- Vice Commander: Colonel James P. Hoye
- Command Chief: Chief Master Sergeant John G. Dubuc

Insignia
- 102nd Intelligence Wing emblem

The United States Air Force's 102nd Intelligence Wing of the Massachusetts Air National Guard, is a military intelligence unit located at Otis Air National Guard Base, Massachusetts. Its primary subordinate operational unit is the 101st Intelligence Squadron. The 102nd Fighter Wing was redesignated the 102nd Intelligence Wing on 6 April 2008 and was planned to reach full operational capacity in 2010.

== Mission ==
The wing mission is "to provide world wide precision intelligence and command and control, along with trained and experienced airmen for expeditionary combat support and homeland security." In addition, the website says that their Air Force–based mission is in line with the ability of joint force commanders to keep pace with information and incorporate it into a campaign plan. In addition to its strictly military role, the wing shares the overall Air National Guard mission of providing assistance during national emergencies such as natural disasters and civil disturbances.

However, the 102nd Intelligence Wing has been ordered to halt its intelligence-gathering mission. Secretary Austin has ordered a DoD-wide review of the military intelligence practices to be completed in 45 days. The recertified 102nd ISRG (Intelligence, surveillance and reconnaissance group) resumed its intelligence mission on 1 June 2024.

== Units assigned ==
=== Current ===
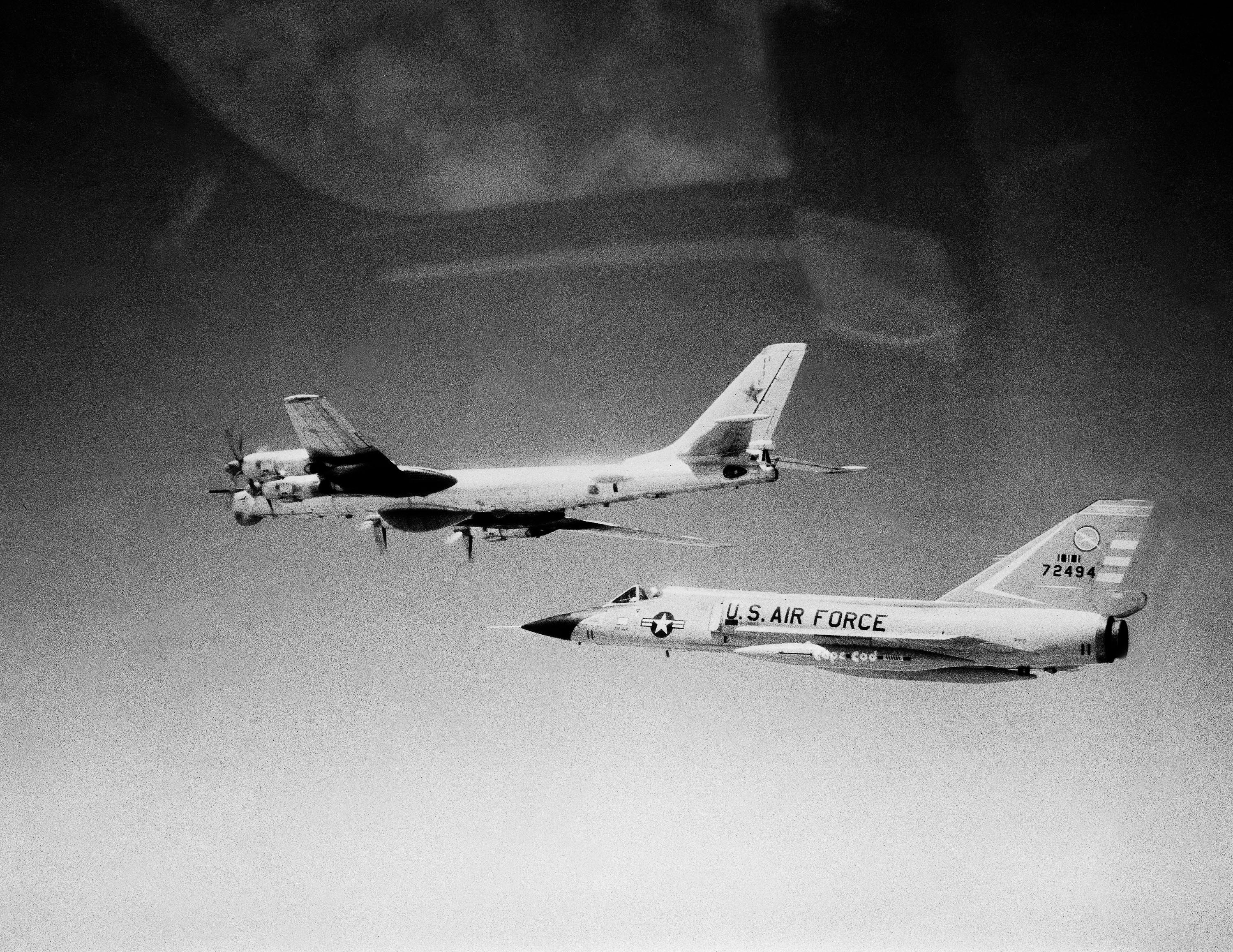
F-106A intercepting Soviet Tu-95 Bear D bomber aircraft off Cape Cod on 15 April 1982

102nd Intelligence Wing (United States)
102nd Intelligence Surveillance Reconnaissance Group	202nd Intelligence Surveillance Reconnaissance Group	102nd Mission Support Group	102nd Medical Group	253rd Cyberspace Engineering Installation Group
101st Intelligence Squadron	267th Intelligence Squadron	102nd Force Support Squadron	102nd Guard Medical Unit	212th Engineering Installation Squadron
102nd Intelligence Support Squadron	203rd Intelligence Squadron	102nd Security Forces Squadron	102nd EMEDS-CM	202nd Weather Flight
102nd Operations Support Squadron	202nd Intelligence Support Squadron	102nd Civil Engineer Squadron		
		102nd Communications Flight		
		102nd Contracting Office		
		102nd Environmental Management Office		
		102nd Logistics Readiness Flight		

=== Former ===
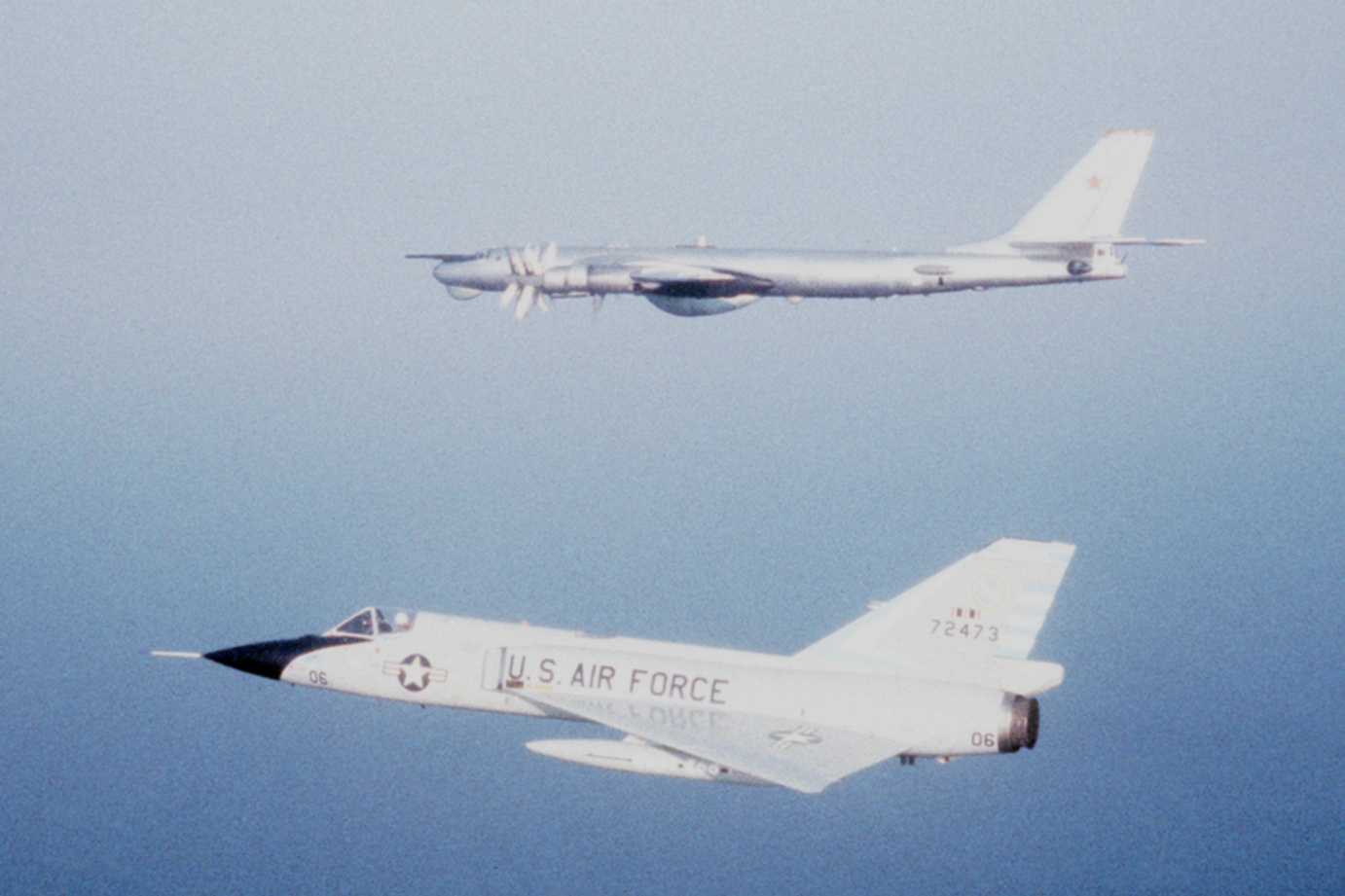
F-106A intercepting a Tu-95 Bear over Nova Scotia. This F-106 later crashed in 1983.

102nd Fighter Wing (United States)
102nd Operations Group	102nd Maintenance Group	102nd Mission Support Group	102nd Medical Group
101st Fighter Squadron	102nd Aircraft Maintenance Squadron	102nd Civil Engineer Squadron	102nd Medical Squadron
102nd Operations Support Flight	102nd Maintenance Squadron	102nd Communications Squadron	
202nd Weather Flight	102nd Maintenance Operations Flight	102nd Security Forces Squadron	
		102nd Mission Support Flight	
		102nd Student Pilot Flight	
		102nd Services Flight	

== History ==
According to the Air Force, the history of the 102nd begins with the 318th Fighter Group, which was active during World War II. After the war, the 318th was inactivated, and eventually the 102nd Fighter Wing was formed, which had a direct lineage link. In 1946, the 102nd was activated at Logan International Airport where it stayed until 1968, when it moved to Otis Air Force Base. Beginning in 1946, the wing began regular patrols of the Northeastern United States which took place in conjunction with Air Force active duty units. In 1968, the 102nd was moved to Otis, where it continued its regular patrols until 1973.

During the time that the wing had a flying mission, the wing deployed to many locations around the globe to assist in missions for the Air Force. In 1961, the wing deployed to France during the Berlin Crisis. Twenty eight years later, the wing deployed to Panama during Operation Coronet Nighthawk. It also participated in Operation Northern Watch, helping to patrol the No-Fly Zone north of the 36th parallel in Iraq. During the September 11 attacks, the 102nd Fighter Wing deployed the first Air Force aircraft toward New York City, but they arrived too late to stop the attacks.

Over the years, the wing has controlled many other Air National Guard units. Following the inactivation of the 67th Fighter Wing in November 1950, the wing was put in charge of a few fighter units on the Atlantic Coast. In 1976, the wing even became responsible for the 147th Fighter Interceptor Group, located in Texas.

Military downsizing through the Base Realignment and Closure (BRAC) process removed the wing's F-15C Eagles beginning in 2007, leaving the 102nd with an intelligence gathering mission. If activated to federal service, the wing is gained by the United States Air Force Air Force Intelligence, Surveillance and Reconnaissance Agency, and is one of three Air National Guard wings under this agency. As commonwealth militia units, the units in the 102nd Intelligence Wing are not in the normal United States Air Force chain of command. They are under the jurisdiction of the Massachusetts National Guard unless they are federalized by order of the President of the United States.

After a large-scale leak of Department of Defense documents in early 2023 that were traced to Jack Teixeira from the wing, the USAF announced a separate investigation on April 18 and halted the wing from carrying out its intelligence tasks.

=== Roots of the 102nd ===
The 102nd Intelligence Wing traces its roots to the 318th Fighter Group which was formed in 1942. It fought in the Pacific as part of bomber escort missions to Japan, and participated in aircraft carrier operations, rarely experienced by the Army Air Force. The 318th returned to the United States after the war, was inactivated on 12 January 1946.

The wartime 318th Fighter Group was redesignated the 102nd Fighter Group, and allotted to the Massachusetts Air National Guard on 24 May 1946. It was organized at Logan Airport, Boston, and was extended federal recognition on 22 October 1946 by the National Guard Bureau.

=== Cold War ===
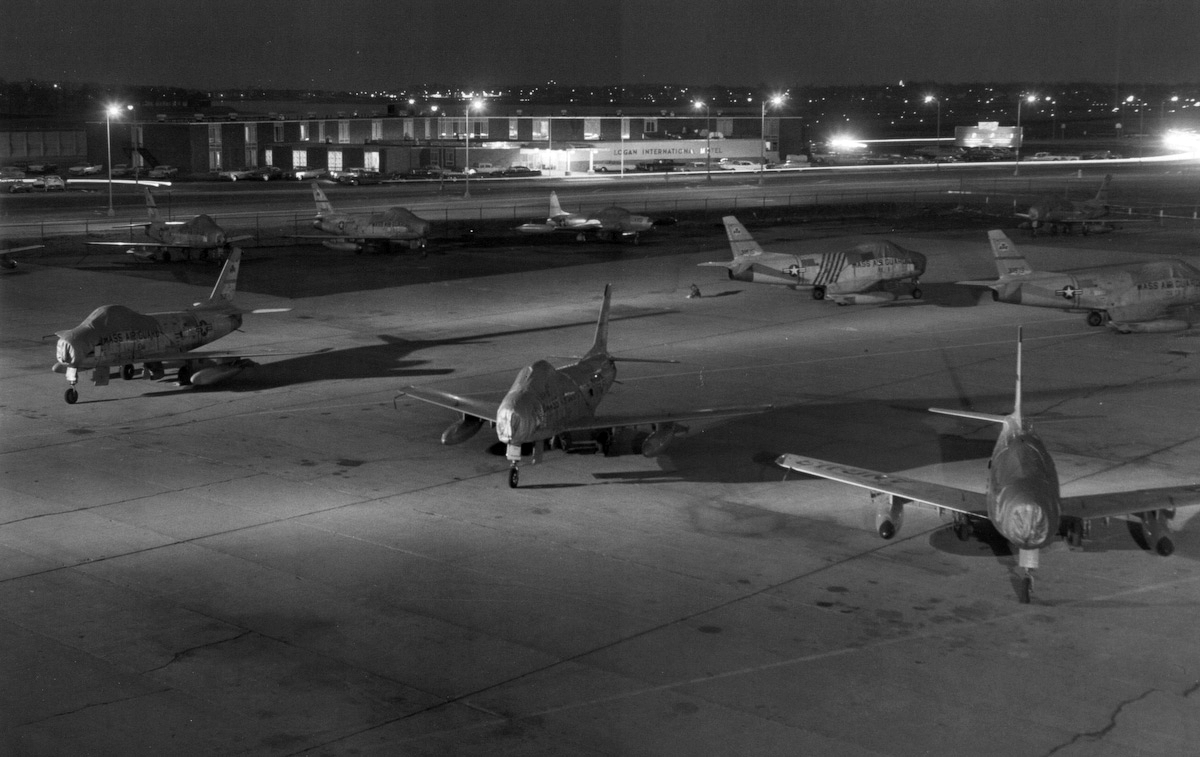
F-86Hs lined up on the ramp at night at Logan

In 1946-47 the National Guard Bureau began a major expansion of its air units. Massachusetts was allotted the 67th Fighter Wing, which consisted of the 101st Fighter Squadron, the 131st Fighter Squadron, the 132nd Fighter Squadron, the 202nd Air Service Group, 601st Signal Construction Company, 101st Communications Squadron, 101st Air Control Squadron, 151st Air Control and Warning Group, 567th Air Force Band, 101st Weather Flight and the 1801st Aviation Engineer Company. The 67th Wing was assigned to Air Defense Command.

Guard units were generally neglected when the United States Air Force was created. Despite the introduction of jet fighters, the Guard units were left with generally overused World War II propeller aircraft, and had few funds for training. As the Cold War intensified, the Air Force looked to the Guard to fill United States–based interception missions and started overhauling their organization. Although the Massachusetts Air National Guard was not federalized for the Korean War, many airmen volunteered for active duty and flew in Korea. On 1 November 1950, the 67th Fighter Wing was inactivated and replaced by the 102nd Fighter Wing, including just the 101st and 131st squadrons and their associated support units, and at some point before 1961 the wing was renamed a Tactical Fighter Wing. Additionally, the wing kept the 567th, and the 1801st. The squadrons were issued F-84B Thunderjets, but these were recalled and replaced by F-51 Mustangs which were flown until 1954 when the F-94 Starfire replaced the Mustangs. In 1952 the 253rd Combat Communications Group was activated and added to the 102nd. In 1958 the Wing converted to the F-86H Sabre.

From 195, the 102nd was commanded by Brigadier General Charles W. Sweeney, pilot of the B-29 Superfortress Bockscar that dropped the Fat Man nuclear bomb on Nagasaki, Japan. During his tenure, the wing developed from a rather new unit to the mainstay of air defense in the Northeastern United States. Sweeney retired as a major general in 1976.

==== Berlin Wall Crisis ====
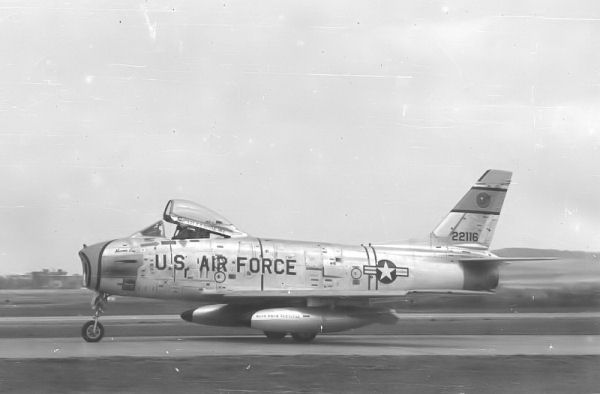
North American YF-86H-5-NA Sabre of the 138th Tactical Fighter Squadron/102nd Tactical Fighter Wing deployed at Phalsbourg – 1962

On 16 August 1961, when the Berlin Wall crisis was unfolding, several United States Air Force Reserve units were notified of their pending recall to active duty. On 1 October the wing and its three squadrons, the 101st, 131st and 138th were placed on active duty at Otis Air Force Base.

In late October, the 102nd departed Logan for Phalsbourg-Bourscheid Air Base, Phalsbourg, France. The wing had 82 Sabres, plus two C-47 Skytrains and six T-33 Shooting Stars for support and training purposes. During the crisis, the wing controlled the 102nd Tactical Fighter Group, the 104th Tactical Fighter Group, and the 174th Tactical Fighter Group from New York. The 102nd's primary mission was to provide close air support to NATO ground forces, including the Seventh Army, and air interdiction. During the blockade, the 102nd did not incur any losses. Starting on 5 December 1961 the 102nd began deploying to Wheelus Air Base, Libya for gunnery training.

During its time in Europe, the 102nd participated in several United States Air Force and North Atlantic Treaty Organization exercises, including a deployment to Leck Air Base, West Germany near the Danish border. At Leck, ground and support crews from both countries exchanged duties, learning how to perform aircraft maintenance and operational support tasks.

The 102nd returned to the United States in August 1962. Regular Air Force personnel and a group of Air National Guard personnel who volunteered to remain on active duty formed the 480th Tactical Fighter Squadron of the newly activated 366th Tactical Fighter Wing.

==== Relocation to Otis ====
In 1968, the 102nd Tactical Fighter Wing moved to Otis Air Force Base, and was reassigned from the Air Defense Command to the Tactical Air Command the next year. The wing flew the F-84F Thunderstreak from 1964 until June 1971, when a squadron of F-100D Super Sabres was transferred directly from units fighting the Vietnam War. These were superseded soon after by the Mach 2 F-106 Delta Darts and on 10 June 1972, the unit became the 102nd Air Defense Wing. On 30 December 1973, Otis Air Force Base was inactivated and transferred to the Massachusetts Air National Guard as Otis Air National Guard Base.

The wing intercepted Soviet Tupolev Tu-95 Bear bombers on many occasions, the first of which occurred off Long Island on 25 April 1975. Many of these incidents involved escorting the Bears to Cuba. The wing occasionally shadowed drug smuggling aircraft, and on one occasion was scrambled to escort an unidentified object, which later turned out to be a weather balloon.

In 1976, the 102nd Fighter Interceptor Group was inactivated and reformed as the 102nd Fighter Interceptor Wing. It assumed authority for the 177th Fighter Interceptor Group at Atlantic City Air National Guard Base and the 125th Fighter Interceptor Group at Jacksonville Air National Guard Base. Both units flew the F-106. It also assumed command of the 107th Fighter Interceptor Group at Niagara Falls Air Reserve Station and the 147th Fighter Interceptor Group at Ellington Field, Texas. The latter two flew the F-4C Phantom.

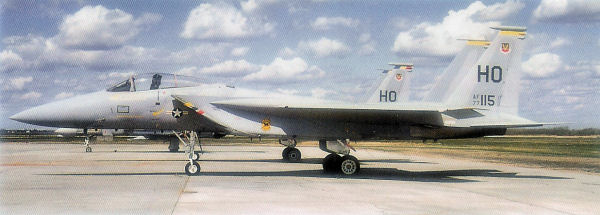
F-15 from the 49th Fighter Wing that was transferred to the 102nd

The 102nd Fighter Interceptor Wing lost its F-106s on 5 January 1988. Between January and April 1988, the wing converted to the F-15A Eagle, which it received from the 5th Fighter-Interceptor Squadron which was inactivating at Minot Air Force Base. It then resumed its alert commitment at Otis, and also established a new Detachment 1 at Loring Air Force Base, taking over for the inactivating 5th Fighter-Interceptor Squadron. The 102nd was the first Air National Guard unit to be equipped with the 102nd 's conversion to the F-15 marked the first Air National Guard air defense unit to receive the Eagle. The 102nd Fighter Interceptor Wing was redesignated the 102nd Fighter Wing in April 1992.

On 24 January 1989, airmen monitoring the radar at the Northeast Air Defense Sector at Griffiss Air Force Base spotted a plane which was not following any known flight plan. The order was then given to "scramble the Eagles," after repeated attempts to contact the pilot failed. Two jets then took off from Loring to search for the "unknown rider." The pilots later came across a plane that was blacked out, with no lights on inside or outside. The pilot was a narcotics smuggler from Colombia's Medellin drug cartel. He was carrying had a street value of two hundred million dollars in the amount of 500 kilograms of cocaine.

=== Post-Cold War ===
==== Local defense ====
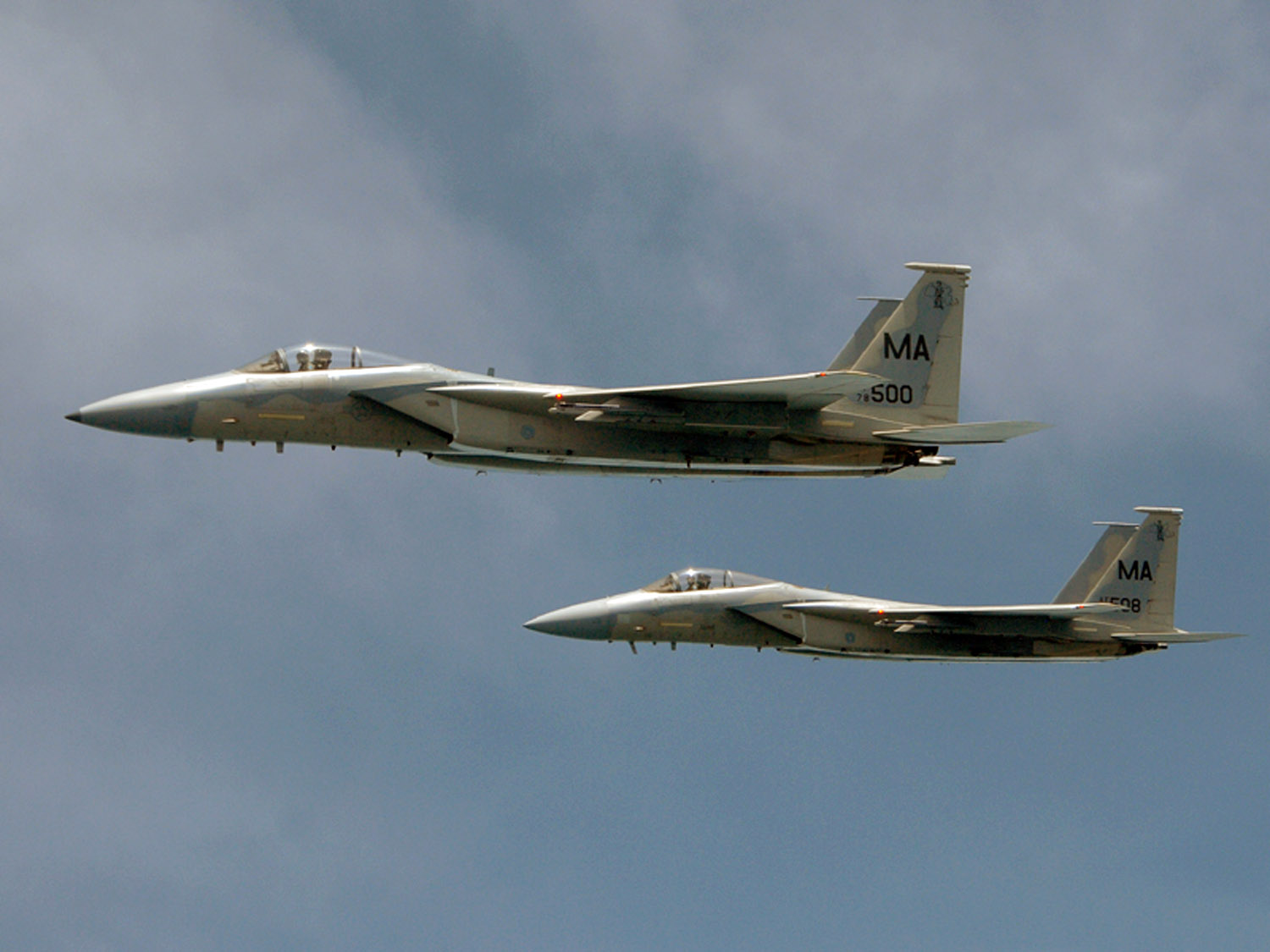
F-15s from Otis Air National Guard Base

The wing continued its air defense mission after the fall of the Soviet Union. In 1992, the wing deployed eight pilots, five F-15 Eagles, and 48 maintenance and security personnel, for five days training at Canadian Forces Base Goose Bay, Labrador, Canada. The same year, with the reorganization of the Air Force, the wing was reassigned from the disbanding Tactical Air Command to the newly formed Air Combat Command. In July 1993, the wing deployed 50 personnel from the 102nd Civil Engineering Squadron under field conditions, to the island of Eleuthera in the Bahamas. They helped rebuild schools and municipal facilities damaged by Hurricane Andrew.

On 11 February 1993, jets were scrambled to intercept the hijacked Lufthansa Flight 592, which eventually landed at John F. Kennedy International Airport without incident. The planes were joined by F-16s from the 177th Fighter Wing in Atlantic City, New Jersey. The F-15s initially intercepted the aircraft off the coast of eastern Canada. The planes then began to trail the jet at a distance of 10-mile (16 km). As they approached the airport, the distance decreased to 5-mile (8.0 km). The fighters then did a low fly-by as the plane landed. They continued to circle around the airport until they returned to Otis.

In 1994, the 102nd received more F-15A/B Eagles from the 32nd Fighter Group at Soesterberg Air Base, which was inactivating as part of the post Cold War draw down of forces in Europe.

==== Deployments ====
Between 1991 and 1995, the 102nd deployed to Panama as part of Operation Coronet Nighthawk, which was a drug interdiction operation. In 1992 the wing became simply the 102nd Fighter Wing as part of an Air Force-wide renaming of units. The wing was deployed from 1995 to 1998 to Iceland for periodic 45-day deployments. In 1998, the wing's members also trained and deployed to Iceland, Canada, Korea, and Europe. The next year, the 102nd participated in Operation Northern Watch and was deployed to Turkey in order to enforce the no-fly zone over Iraq north of the 36th Parallel. In 2000, personnel were deployed to the Middle East and Europe in order to participate in Operation Southern Watch.

==== 9/11 terrorist attacks ====
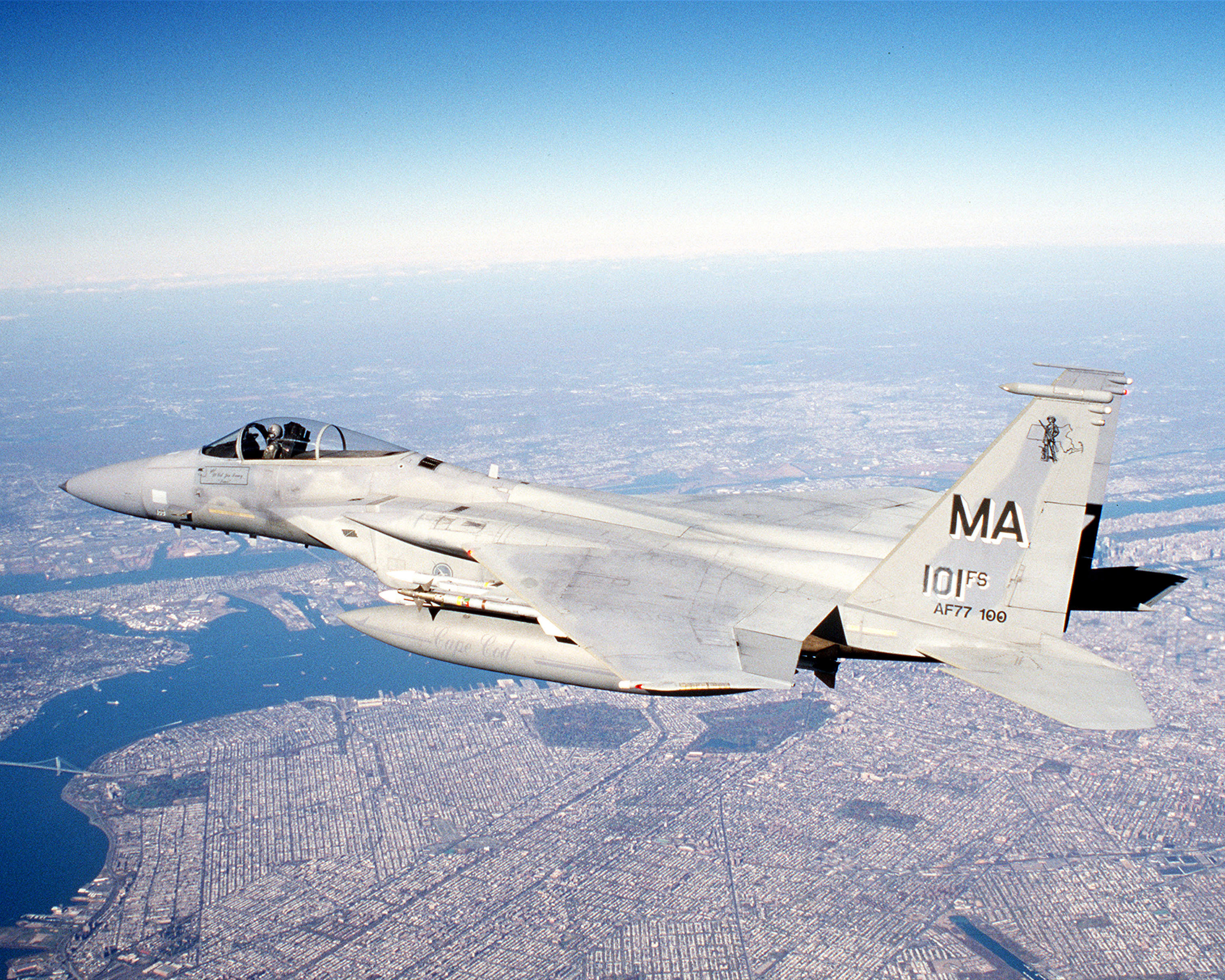
F-15 over New York City after 9/11

Around 8:30 on the morning of 11 September 2001, the Otis Air Base Operations Center received a call from the Federal Aviation Administration's Cape Cod Facility Calls Operations Center that it might be receiving a call from the North American Aerospace Defense Command's Northeast Air Defense Sector. The manager of the Cape Cod facility then called the 102nd at Otis Air National Guard Base as they figured "...a call [to Otis Air Base] will be coming from NEADS soon and a scramble order is likely." He called the base because he figured that the pilots would appreciate the heads up. When he called the Otis operations center, the superintendent of aviation management, Mark Rose, answered. He was initially confused by the call as no identification was given. Lieutenant Colonel Timothy Duffy was then handed the phone and alerted of the situation. On his radio, he called pilot Major Daniel Nash, the pilot who was sharing alert duty, and told him to get ready for a coming alert call. He also told him to suit up and get ready for a scramble call.

Soon after, the commander of the 101st Fighter Squadron phoned the Northeast Air Defense Sector and asked for permission to launch the fighter jets. The sector in turn responded by ordering the commander of the weapons team which controlled the jets, Major Kevin Naspany, to place the fighters on "battle stations." This resulted in a warning siren sounding at Otis and the pilots scrambled to their jets. Four to five minutes later, the scramble order was received and the jets took off. Officially, this occurred at 8:46 am, with a six-minute difference between the official and unofficial accounts. Duffy radioed his command post for guidance and was told among other things that American Airlines Flight 11 was a Boeing 737, when in reality it was a 767. Once in the air, their radar kicked in, allowing them to effectively intercept the plane.

Difficulties in accurately locating Flight 11 caused a delay of five minutes, to 8:43 am, before the scramble order was given and pilots Duffy and Nash could respond. When Flight 11 hit the North Tower at 8:46, the two jets were still readying for flight and did not take off until 8:52 am.

Major Naspany was then asked what to do with the fighters and he responded by saying, "Send 'em to New York City still. Continue! Go! This is what I got. Possible news that a 737 just hit the World Trade Center. This is a real-world...Continue taking the fighters down to the New York City area, JFK [International Airport] area, if you can. Make sure that the FAA clears it—your route all the way through...Let's press with this." Unsure of their target, they were directed to a holding pattern in military-controlled airspace Whiskey 105 off of Long Island to avoid New York area air traffic. At 9:03 am, United Airlines Flight 175 hit the South Tower as the fighters were progressing to their holding position. The Northeast Air Defense Sector was not advised of this hijacked aircraft until 9:03.

Between 9:09 and 9:13, the jets stayed in a holding pattern. Soon after, they headed toward Manhattan and arrived at 9:25, where they established a Combat Air Patrol over the city.

While all of this was going on, senior battle staff at Otis were watching the news when United Airlines Flight 175 crashed into the South Tower. This immediately caused one commander to shout out, "We need to go to battle staff!" This order caused senior commanders to disperse and head towards nearby operations buildings. Inside, the gathered together in the battle cab of the installation operations center. Soon after, a voice came over the base's loudspeakers: "The commander has ordered the 102nd core battle staff to assemble. Please report to the operations building immediately." Mobilization of the wing began to occur after this time. At the time of the order, eighteen planes were ready for flight and commanders began to prepare based on what they anticipated they would be asked to do. Most of these actions were guessing because there had never been an attack on the country before. Knowing that they could not await on guidance from the North American Aerospace Defense Command, the recalled all training flights and began loading fuel and weapons onto all available fighter jets.

Meanwhile, at the battle cab, a maintenance squadron officer was told, "Listen, I want you to generate as many airframes [i.e. fighter jets] as you can!" This immediately caused all personnel to be called back and they were ordered to work on the remaining jets. This rush involved the placement of missiles on all jets, including some newer missiles which were rarely pulled out. Six jets which were on a training mission were traversing through the Whiskey Airspace when they were told by the Boston Air Route Traffic Control Center to head back to Otis immediately. Once landed, the pilots were told to park their jets but leave the engines running. Finally, the first planes took off at 10:20 in the morning.

After a while, an order was received to launch all available fighters. Pilots were briefed on the national emergency and the potential that they might have to take out an aircraft. At this point, someone then ran into the room and said that there had been an order that was received from the Northeast Air Defense Sector that all available jets must launch. The pilots then ran out to their aircraft with speaker Treacy saying "Go, go, go!" In the haste that the morning had become, not all the jets had been refueled and a majority of the jets were still unarmed. The handful of jets that were armed were sent up with one or two missiles. The standard missile load involves at least two missiles at launch. This is after the handlers had worked at a "furious pace" and "hurried to fix all available jets with live weapons." Arming of the jets even began fifteen minutes after the South Tower had been hit. This fact would later lend credence to the theory that there was an idea floating around to ram the hijacked planes with a jet. Starting around 10:30 and ending at six that night, all twenty one planes were put into the air.

===== Conspiracy link =====
After the initial shock of the attacks had passed, questions arose about how the military handled the hijacking and subsequent response with the jets. Some thought that the jets had been purposely kept from flying immediately to New York City. The questions arising from the response time of the jets come from the practice of Cold War era policies which prohibited the immediate response to an emergency like a hijacking. First responder and pilot Daniel Nash said that he could not recall being told that the North Tower was hit but he did remember seeing the smoke over 70-mile (110 km) away. It is also claimed by conspiracists that the calculations of North American Aerospace Defense Command were incorrect because according to their own calculations, the planes were flying at 24% of their maximum speed. This statement takes into account the time in which the planes were in a holding pattern over military airspace. The jets were also prohibited from going supersonic over land by Federal Aviation Administration rules. These rules are meant to prevent damage to buildings from the shock wave a sonic boom produces.

=== Global war on terror ===
==== Operation Noble Eagle ====
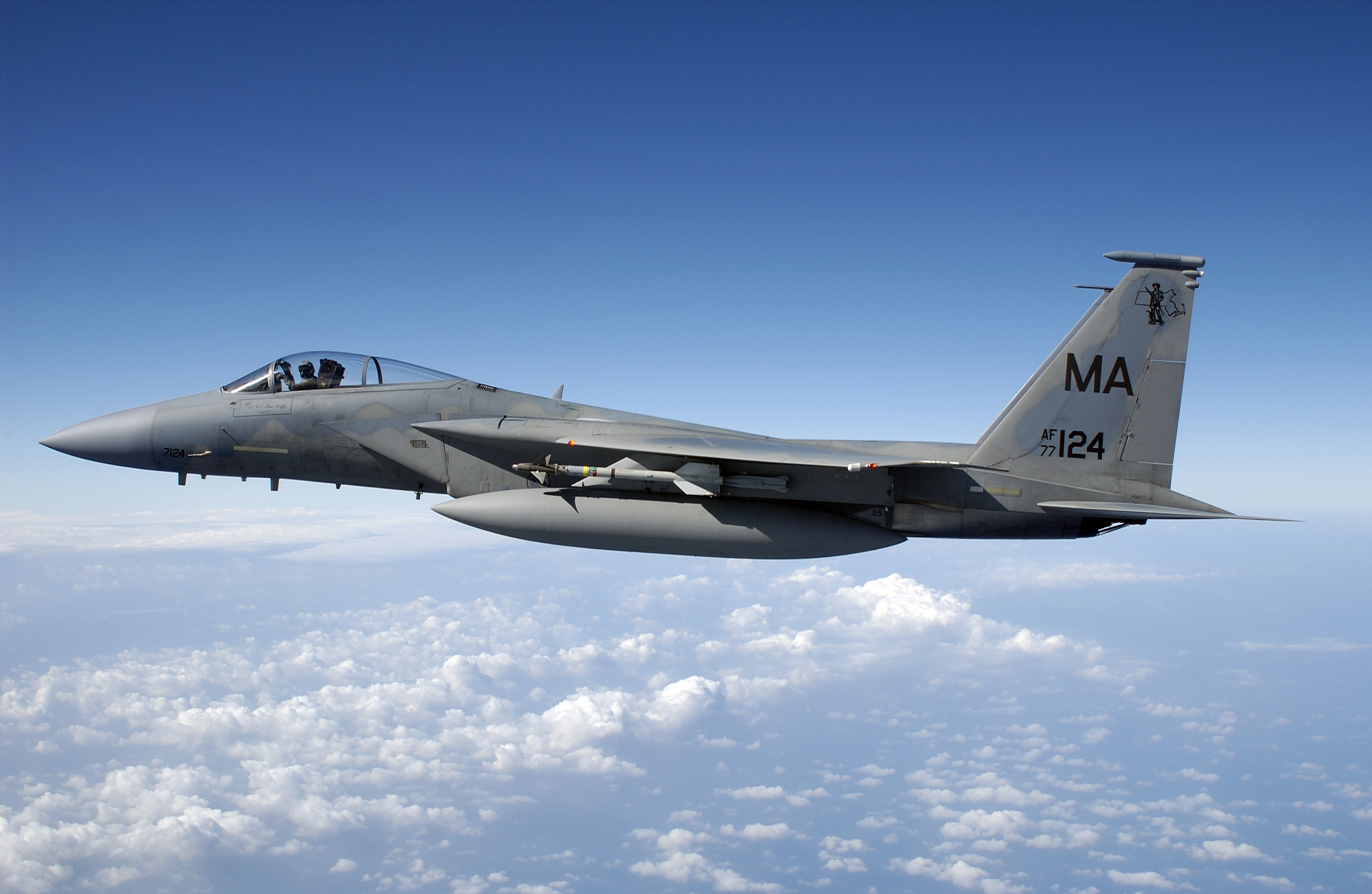
An F-15C from the 102d Fighter Wing prepares to fire upon an aerial drone over the Gulf of Mexico in 2005

More than 600 wing members were mobilized for Operation Noble Eagle, and the wing began flying around-the-clock combat air patrol missions immediately thereafter. This continued until February 2002. On 22 December 2001 the wing escorted American Airlines Flight 63 as a direct result of Richard Reid trying to blow up a plane.

In the buildup to the invasion of Afghanistan, six F-15s and 161 personnel were sent to the Persian Gulf region. The wing also patrolled the skies of the Northeastern United States during this time period. The wing though never deployed for Operation Iraqi Freedom. The wing converted from the F-15A/B to the F-15C/D in 2004. These planes came from Kadena Air Base.

==== BRAC 2005 ====
The Base Realignment and Closure 2005 commission originally planned to close Otis Air National Guard Base and dissolve the 102nd. Locals argued that this would leave a huge gap in the national air defenses. Commission officials, after visiting the base, decided to keep it open, but the 102nd would still lose its planes, only this time they were only going to the 104th Fighter Wing, based at Barnes Municipal Airport.

In May 2006 it trained with the Israeli Air Force's 115 Squadron.

The wing hosted the Cape Cod Air Show & Open House, its last air show with the F-15C Eagle at the end of Air Force Week in August 2007. The wing shared a commonality with the 101st Air Refueling Wing, the 103d Fighter Wing, and the 104th Fighter Wing, which due to commission decisions, also changed the type of planes that they flew. Beginning in 2007, the F-15s began moving to Barnes Municipal Airport. With the grounding of the F-15 Eagles, the 158th Fighter Wing, which is based in Vermont took over the role of patrolling the Northeast's skies earlier than expected. This interruption of the F-15's flight, coinciding with the transitioning of the fighter jets to the 104th Fighter Wing, created some issues.

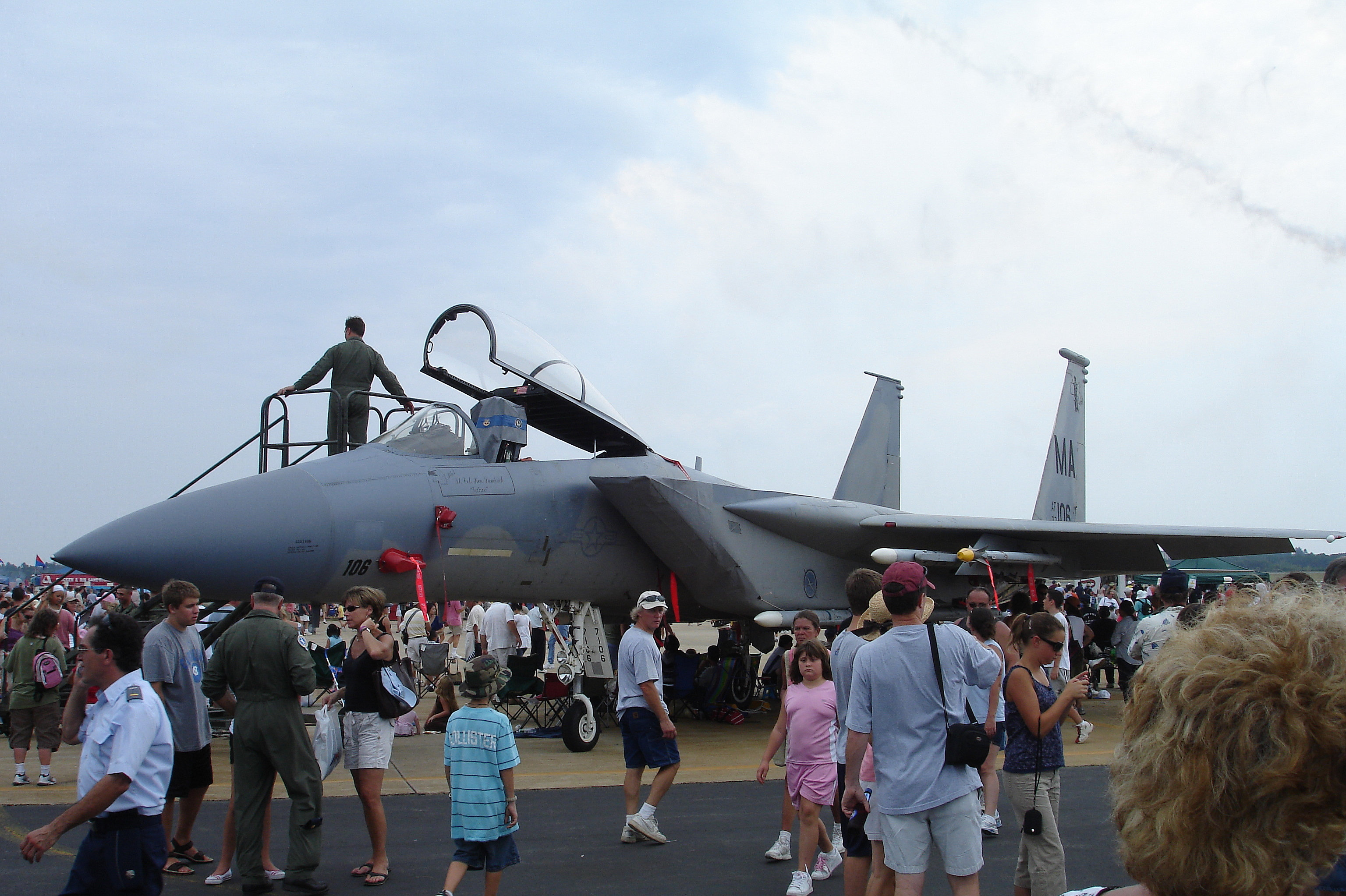
F-15 From 101st Fighter Squadron during the 2007 Cape Cod Air Show

On 24 January 2008, the 102nd Fighter Wing flew its last patrol mission. The unit is wing commander, Colonel Anthony Schiavi, led the flight, accompanied by Major Daniel Nash, who was one of the first responders for 9/11. Fire trucks were on hand when the team landed a half-hour later, giving the planes and the pilots the customary ceremonial hose-down for the last time.

==== 2008: new mission ====
When it was announced that the wing would be restructured and Otis Air National Guard Base would remain open, discussions began about the future of the 102nd. Staff of the 102nd and those at Massachusetts Air National Guard headquarters considered a plan centered on the idea that the wing could transition to an intelligence mission to support the growing war on terror. The idea hit a roadblock when it was announced that the funds which the wing could use to convert into its new mission had been depleted.

Eventually, Governor Deval Patrick announced that the wing would adopt an intelligence role as soon as the aircraft left.

Original Base Realignment and Closure commission plans only hinted at a Distributed Common Ground System being created at Otis. These plans did not include the air guardsmen affected by the loss of their jobs. The issue was resolved when the Air Force announced its plans, right before the F-15s started to leave for Barnes.

Members of the wing had the option of moving with the F-15s to Barnes, but most decided to stay behind and train for new missions. The crash trucks went to Barnes, leaving the brush breakers of the Massachusetts Military Reservation behind. The buildings formerly occupied by the fighter wing, including the hangars, will be occupied by the intelligence mission.

On 6 November 2009, ground was broken on new facilities for the 102nd Intelligence Wing. The building was to eventually replace the temporary facilities in which the wing was then operating.

=== Intelligence leak ===
In an article published on April 13, 2023, the New York Times revealed that the individual responsible for the 2023 Pentagon document leaks was a junior enlisted member of the 102nd. The FBI arrested Airman 1st Class Jack Teixeira, cyber transport systems journeyman of the 102nd Intelligence Wing, Joint Base Cape Cod for allegedly uploading Top Secret information to a Discord server. Teixeira was stationed at Fort Bragg during the time of the data leaks, which were widely reported.

The detachment commander and operations commander of the 102nd Intelligence Support Squadron have both been suspended, pending completion of the Inspector General's investigation into the leak; both commanders have also lost their access to classified data. Other airmen from the unit are sidelined from the primary mission of the 102nd.

Texeira was observed making notes on the intelligence stream and was warned about his behavior. Texeira has been indicted on six counts; after the warnings, authorities were baffled over how long Texeira was allowed to continue to operate at the Air National Guard Base. See Need to know

In response, the Pentagon is instituting °Top Secret Control Officers, °plans for electronic device detection systems suitable for classified, secret, and top secret areas, and °an office to address insider threats. The Justice department said each violation for "Unauthorized retention and transmission of national defense information provides for a sentence of up to 10 years in prison, up to three years of supervised release, and a fine of up to $250,000".

On 11 December 2023 Wing Commander Sean Riley was relieved of command, and 14 others were disciplined.

=== Formation of A-staff ===
On 28 June 2023 the 102nd Wing commander announced the formation of an A-staff to operate in parallel with wing staff; from twenty to twenty-six positions would reach initial operating capability (IOC) on 1 October 2023. The A-staff would have crisis action planning capability to off-load demands on the operational wing; the A-staff will have functional directorates (A-1: Manpower, Personnel and Services, A-2/3/5: Intelligence, Operations and Strategic Plans, A-4: Logistics and Engineering, and A-6: Communications), each reporting to the wing's chief of staff. 102nd IW will serve as test unit for non-flying wings, and a beta site for ISR (Intelligence, surveillance and reconnaissance). Corresponding A-staffs are being formed, for example at Air Task Forces (ATFs) as a test.
