= Barnstable County Jail and House of Correction =

Former county jail in Massachusetts, United States

- Interactive map of Barnstable County Jail and House of Correction
- Location: Barnstable, Massachusetts; 41°41′57.60″N 70°18′15.77″W
- Status: Closed
- Opened: 1930s
- Closed: 2004
- Managed by: Massachusetts Department of Correction
- Director: James Cummings

The Barnstable County Jail and House of Correction is the former county jail for Barnstable County. It was opened in the 1930s as a replacement for the second Barnstable Jail, which was constructed in 1821, itself a replacement for the Old Jail, the oldest wooden jail in America. During the 1990s the prison became overcrowded as Cape Cod's population increased during the housing boom. Construction began on a modern facility and in October, 2004 the last prisoners were transferred to the new Barnstable County Correctional Facility.

Between 2004 and 2010 the structure remained largely empty with the exception of its center section, which housed offices of the Massachusetts Trial Court Community Service Program. This section of the building is currently in use by the Barnstable County Department of Health and Environment and the Southeast Regional offices of the Massachusetts Department of Environmental Protection.

In 2010 the renovation of the West wing of the jail began, having been largely abandoned for six years. It currently houses the Barnstable County Information Technology Department, the Barnstable County Community Septic Management Loan Program, and a conference room. The facility is also the current home of the Barnstable County Cataldo Archives.

Construction on the new Barnstable County Department of Health and Environment Water Quality Lab began in late 2011 in the former gymnasium. The gymnasium, which was originally constructed in 1976, most recently played host to the Jail's chapel. The Water Quality Lab was located in the basement of the Barnstable County Courthouse before its relocation.
