= Westfield-Barnes Regional Airport =

Airport in Massachusetts, United States

Westfield-Barnes Regional Airport (formerly Barnes Municipal Airport)
- IATA: BAF; ICAO: KBAF; FAA LID: BAF

Summary
- Airport type: Public
- Owner: City of Westfield
- Serves: Westfield / Springfield, Massachusetts
- Elevation AMSL: 270 ft (82 m)
- Coordinates: 42°09′29″N 072°42′57″W
- Website: www.BarnesAirport.com

Map
- Interactive map of Westfield-Barnes Regional Airport

Runways
Direction	Length		Surface
Direction	ft	m	Surface
02/20	9,000	2,743	Asphalt
15/33	5,000	1,524	Asphalt

Statistics (2022)
- Aircraft operations (year ending 3/31/2022): 47,815
- Based aircraft: 124
- Source: FAA and airport website

Westfield-Barnes Regional Airport (IATA: BAF, ICAO: KBAF, FAA LID: BAF) is a joint civil-military airport in Hampden County, Massachusetts, three miles (6 km) north of Westfield and northwest of Springfield. It was formerly Barnes Municipal Airport; the National Plan of Integrated Airport Systems for 2011–2015 categorized it as a general aviation facility. Westfield-Barnes is one of Massachusetts' largest airports with a strong flight training, general aviation, and military presence. It is also known as Barnes Air National Guard Base.

== History ==
Camp Bartlett was a summer training facility of the Massachusetts Army National Guard in Westfield, Massachusetts from 1905 to around 1918. It later became a mobilization camp for the 26th Division for World War I.

After the United States entered World War I the expansive plain was heavily used by the federal government in August–September 1917 as Camp Bartlett, a mobilization and training camp for the 103rd and 104th Infantry Regiments of the 26th "Yankee" Division, prior to deployment in France.

In 1923 citizens of Westfield, and nearby Holyoke set out to build an airport. A group of influential local businessmen was charged to convince the owner of the land where the airport is now, Vincent E. Barnes, to sell his land to the City of Westfield for an airport. Barnes agreed to donate his land. The 27-acre (110,000 m^{2}) plot was named Westfield Aviation Field and was dedicated on October 12, 1923. As the field gained in popularity, Vincent Barnes leased the city another 27-acre (110,000 m^{2}) plot, with a fee of $1 per year starting in 1927. In 1936 Mrs. Barnes and her daughter Saddie Knox donated an additional 297 acres (1.2 km^{2}) to the city of Westfield; shortly thereafter, the City Council voted to name the airport after the family that made it possible.

In 1939-40 the administration building, hangar, and the beacon light were built with grant money totaling near $90,000. Soon a passenger service started: on October 28, 1937, a 10-passenger tri-motor Stinson began weekly flights between Westfield and Newark, New Jersey. American Airlines DC-3s operated out of Westfield 1938 to 1950 and Mohawk DC-3s 1953 to 1959. The January 1951 chart shows 4970-ft runway 2, 3970-ft runway 9, and 5000-ft runway 15; same nine years later except runway 2 was 7000 ft.

In the last 50 years the airport has expanded to 1,200 acres and added a VORTAC and an ILS. In 1974 the Air Traffic Control Tower opened.

A $7.6 million construction project started in April 2020 to rebuild runway 15–33. The last reconstruction of this runway was completed in 1970's.

As of 2020 the Massachusetts Air National Guard base is the home of the 104th Fighter Wing.

By May 2024, work to expand Taxiway B South for F-35 operations had begun.

== Facilities ==
The airport covers 1,200 acres (5 km^{2}) at an elevation of 270 feet (82 m). It has two asphalt runways: 2/20 is 9,000 by 150 feet (2,743 × 46 m) and 15/33 is 5,000 by 100 feet (1,524 × 30 m).

The airport recently opened a new administration and terminal, replacing a terminal that housed the original control tower. It is also the site of a major Massachusetts Air National Guard fighter jet wing and support installation.

=== Aircraft ===
In the year ending March 31, 2022, the airport had 47,815 aircraft operations, average 131 per day: 85% general aviation, 12% military, 2% air taxi, and <1% commercial.

124 aircraft were then based at the airport: 86 single-engine, 6 multi-engine, 4 jet, 1 helicopter, 26 military, and 1 ultralight.

Occasionally the airport will service charter flights for the University of Massachusetts Amherst sports teams such as by Sun Country Airlines using Boeing 737-800 aircraft.

=== Flight Schools ===
Established in 2017, FLY LUGU (Look Up, Go Up) is the main flight school at Westfield Barnes Airport. Offering training in a variety of modern equipped aircraft including single engine Cessna 150, 172, 182, Piper Archer. Twin engine training is done utilizing Beechcraft Baron. All pilot ratings are offered.

=== Restaurant and Bar ===
The Runway restaurant closed in early 2015 and became occupied by Papps Bar. Papp’s closed after approximately 2 years in operation and became Sok’s which offered high end cocktails and Asian Fusion type fair. Sok’s closed after another 18-24 months. In 2020 Tobiko, which translates to “Flying Fish” opened. They offer an extensive sushi and sashimi menu, as well as ramen, and many other Asian fare.

=== Museum ===
The Westfield Aviation Museum is located at Hangar 3 at the Westfield-Barnes Regional Airport. Located just southeast of the main terminal building, it houses many flying vintage aircraft including WWII training aircraft such as the Fairchild PT-23, Boeing-Stearman Model 75, de Havilland Tiger Moth, and a Cessna UC-78 Bobcat project.

== See also ==
- List of airports in Massachusetts
