= Joint Base Cape Cod =

United States military base

Coordinates: 41°42′15″N 70°32′30″W

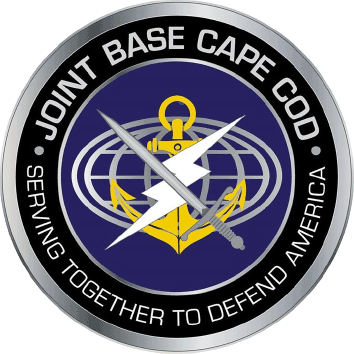
Logo of Joint Base Cape Cod.

The Joint Base Cape Cod is a state-designated joint base created by the Commonwealth of Massachusetts and the United States Department of Defense in 1935. Governor James Curley signed the state bill to allocate and purchase land for a military facility, and establishing a formal commission to manage this new state military property and personnel. After 22,000 acres (8,900 ha; 89 km^{2}; 34 mi^{2}) of land was secured on Cape Cod, the Massachusetts National Guard began erecting tents and a basic training program in the following year. Originally named Camp Edwards, and renamed as the Massachusetts Military Reservation, it was renamed in 2013 to Joint Base Cape Cod by Massachusetts; although having a name similar to many federal military installations, it has no federal recognition.

== 1970s ==
Otis Air National Guard Base underwent boundary changes in 1975. This realignment included these installations: Otis Air National Guard Base, Camp Edwards, and the Coast Guard Air Station Cape Cod.

Cape Cod Space Force Station was created when the air force returned in 1978. The U.S. Air Force constructed the Precision Acquisition Vehicle Entry Phased Array Warning System (PAVE PAWS). PAVE PAWS is designed to detect airborne ballistic missiles and monitor orbiting satellites.

== 2020s ==
In the 2023 Pentagon document leaks the FBI arrested Airman 1st Class Jack Teixeira, cyber transport systems journeyman of the 102nd Intelligence Wing, Joint Base Cape Cod for allegedly uploading Top Secret information to a Discord server, and charged with violating the Espionage Act. Teixeira had access to sensitive compartmented access (SCI) information.

== Military bases ==
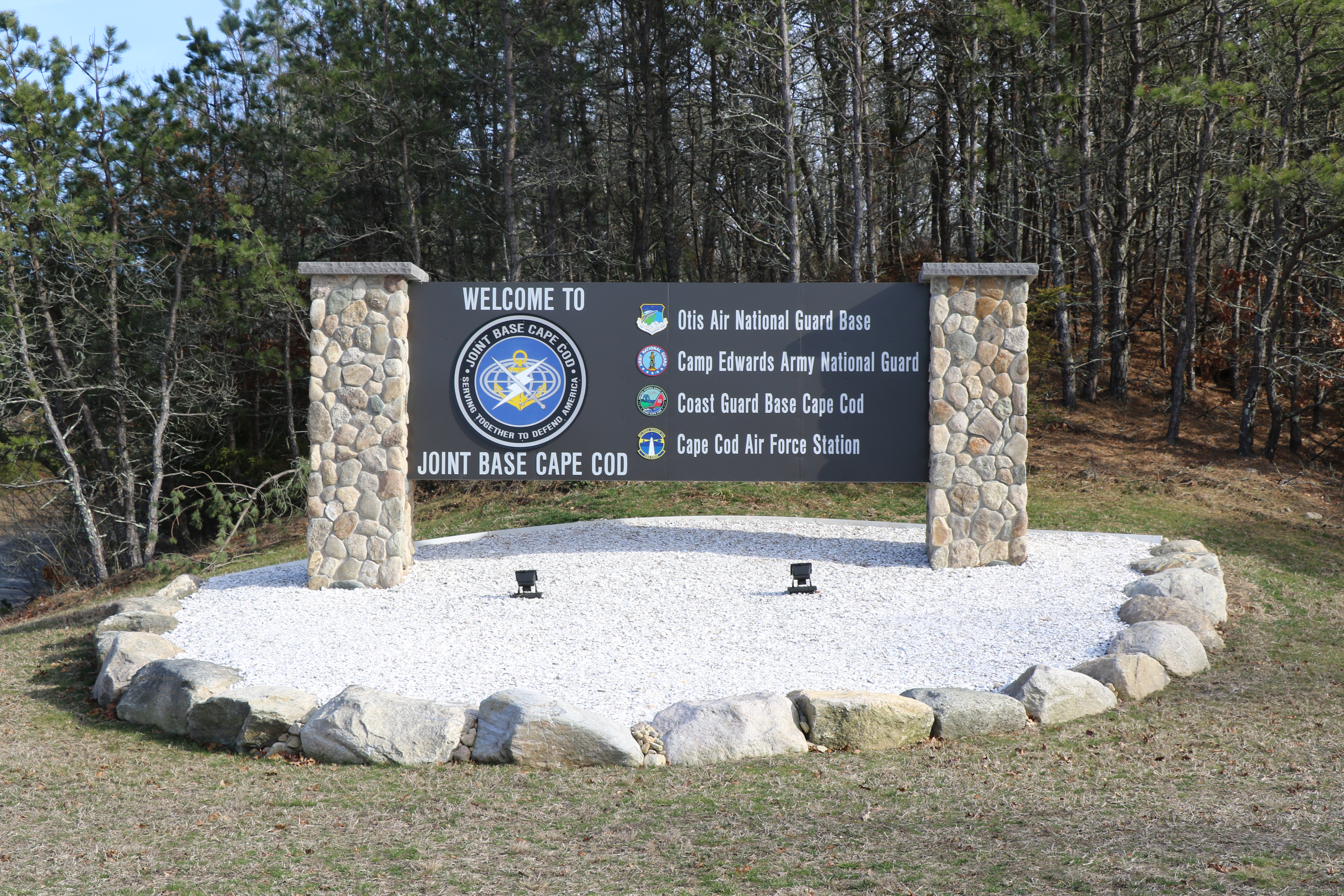
Entrance sign to Joint Base Cape Cod.

- Otis Air National Guard Base
- Camp Edwards
- Cape Cod Space Force Station
- Coast Guard Air Station Cape Cod
- Coast Guard Base Cape Cod

== Other facilities ==
- The Volpe Center's Aviation Weather Research Facility
- Port Security Unit 301
- Civil Air Patrol Coastal Patrol 18, Cape Cod Composite Squadron (NER MA 044)
- Massachusetts National Cemetery
- Barnstable County Correctional Facility and Sheriff's Office
- Massachusetts Environmental Management Commission

== See also ==
- Massachusetts Military Reservation Wind Project at Joint Base Cape Cod
- List of military installations in Massachusetts
- United States Coast Guard Air Stations
