= Barnstable County Correctional Facility =

Jail in Massachusetts, United States

- Interactive map of Barnstable County Correctional Facility
- Location: Bourne, Massachusetts; 41°40′38.44″N 70°34′18.49″W
- Status: Operational
- Capacity: 588
- Opened: 2004
- Closed: N/A
- Managed by: Massachusetts Department of Correction
- Director: Sheriff Donna Buckley

The Barnstable County Correctional Facility is the county jail for Barnstable County. It was opened in 2004, replacing an earlier structure from the 1930s. The building also houses the Barnstable County Sheriff's Office. Sheriff, James M. Cummings hired former Massachusetts 10th district congressional candidate, Jeff Perry as "special sheriff" on 25 January 25, 2011. The facility is located within the established boundaries of Massachusetts Military Reservation, though it is outside the gated and fenced security perimeter and is thus accessible by the general public.
