= 104th Fighter Wing =

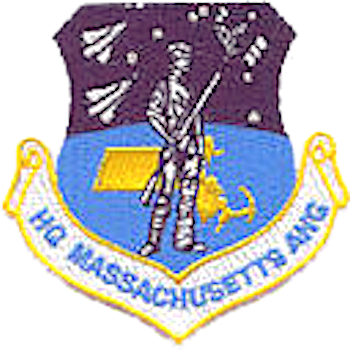
104th Fighter Wing

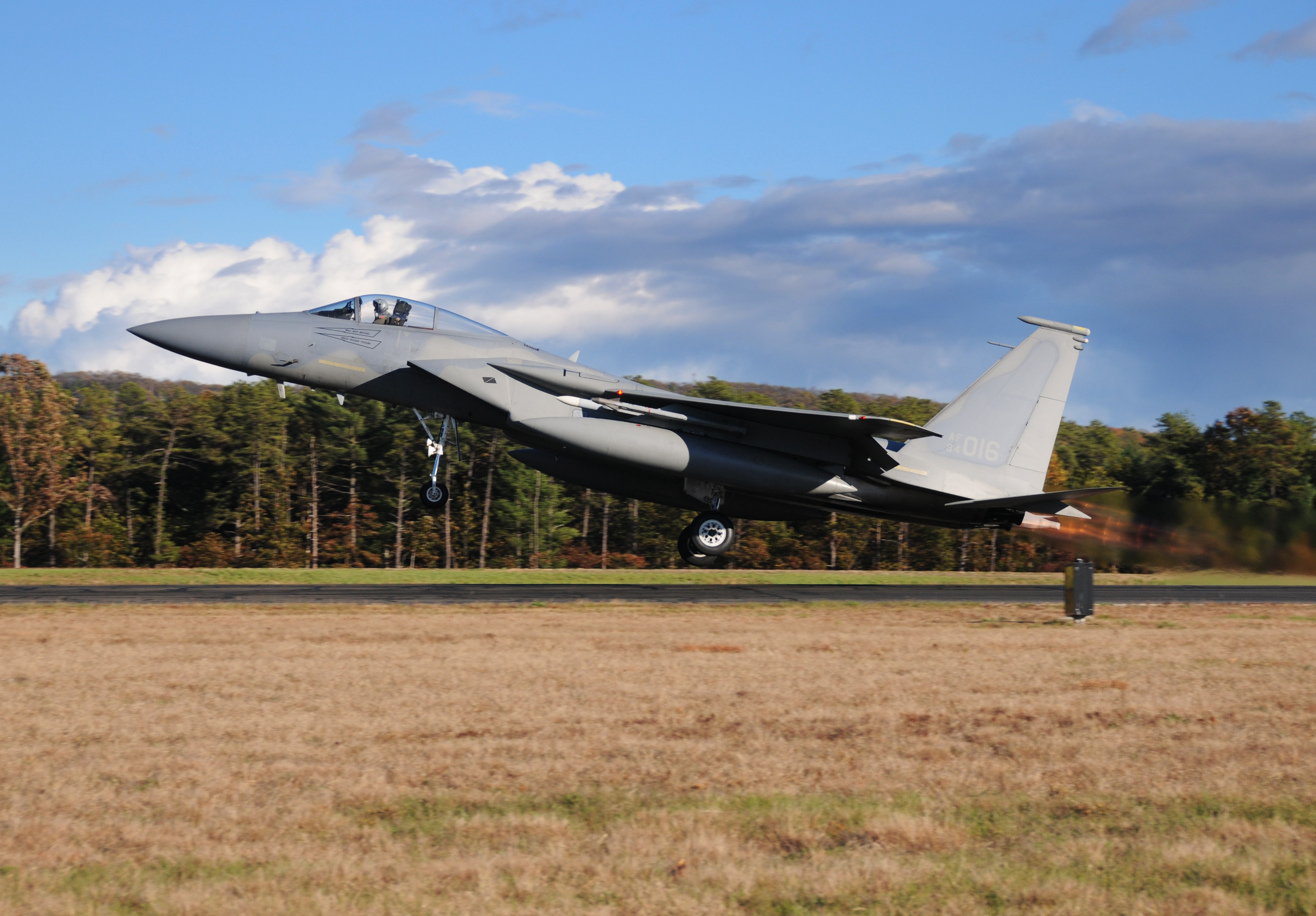
- 104th Fighter Wing F-15C-38-MC Eagle 84-0016
- Active: 1956–present
- Country: United States
- Allegiance: Massachusetts
- Branch: Air National Guard
- Type: Wing
- Role: Fighter/Air Defense
- Part of: Massachusetts Air National Guard
- Garrison/HQ: Westfield-Barnes Regional Airport (Barnes Air National Guard Base), Massachusetts
- Nickname: Barnestormers
- Decorations: Air Force Outstanding Unit Award

Commanders
- Commander: Col. Michael P. Glass
- Command Chief Master Sergeant: CMSgt. Michael Gardner

Insignia
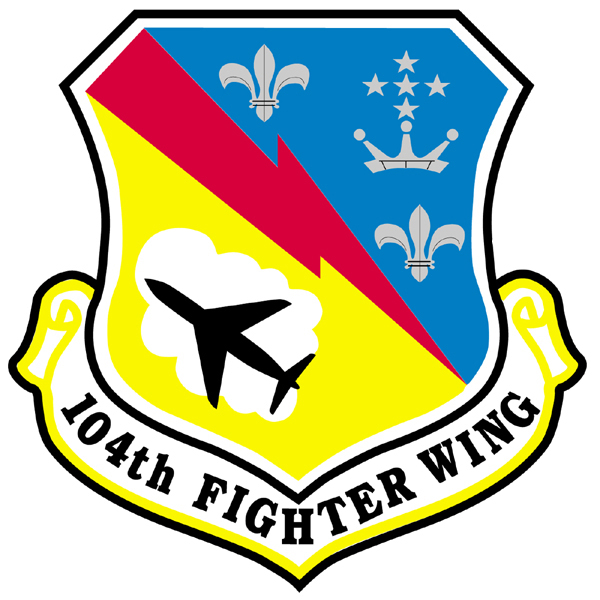
- 104th Fighter Wing emblem (Note: Blue and Yellow are the Air Force colors. Blue alludes to the sky, the primary theater of Air Force operations. Yellow refers to the sun and the excellence required of Air Force personnel. The aircraft in cloud represents the primary mission - combat capability through air power. The bolt of lightning represents the eagerness to strike. The five stars represent the 131st Fighter Squadron, symbolized by their 1-3-1 configuration. The crown & crown pPoints represent the ethnic diversity of the men and women who founded the 104th. The two fleur-de-lis representthe unit deployments to and from France during the 1961 blockade of Berlin by the Soviet Union. The emblem was designed by MSgt. Robert J. Della Penna, original artwork by SSgt. Donald Bein, computer generated image by MSgt. Robert J. Sabonis)
- Tail Code: MA
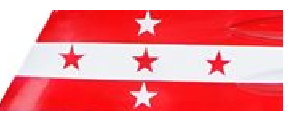
- Tail stripe

Aircraft flown
- Fighter: F-35A Lightning II

The 104th Fighter Wing is a unit of the Massachusetts Air National Guard, stationed at Westfield-Barnes Regional Airport (Barnes Air National Guard Base), Westfield, Massachusetts. When activated to federal service, the Wing is gained by the United States Air Force Air Combat Command.

In its dual state mission, the 104th Fighter Wing is an Air Force component of the Massachusetts National Guard.

== Mission ==
The 104th Fighter Wing flies the F-35 Lightning II and supports Air Force wartime contingency requirements, performing a variety of missions to include a 24/7 active Air Control Alert (ACA) to protect the Northeast corridor of the United States.

In addition to the ACA mission, the highly decorated Wing provides operationally ready combat units, combat support units and qualified personnel for active duty. Its mission is to organize, train and equip assigned personnel to provide an operationally ready squadron to the Air Combat Command that flies, fights and wins.

The 104th Fighter Wing was selected for replacement of the aging F-15 Eagle with the F-35A Lightning II. The first 104th F-35A was delivered to the Squadron on 14 Sept. 2026.

== Units ==
The 104th Fighter Wing is composed of the:

- 104th Operations Group

131st Fighter Squadron

- 104th Maintenance Group
- 104th Mission Support Group
- 104th Medical Group

The 104th Fighter Wing has nine Air Force Outstanding Unit Awards.

== History ==
In 1946 , the National Guard Bureau authorized an Air National Guard unit in Western Massachusetts. On 24 February 1947, the unit was federally recognized as the 131st Tactical Fighter Squadron, 131st Utility Flight, 131st Weather Flight, and Detachment B of the 202nd Air Services Group.

The unit received its first plane, the P-47 Thunderbolt I, in the winter of 1949, and was chosen to conduct a flyover for President Truman's inauguration. That year the first edition of the unit paper, called the "Thunderbolt" was also published. The paper was later named the "Airscoop" and has won three Department of Defense (DOD) awards in nationwide competitions since publication began.

The 131st FIS becoming the group's flying squadron. Other squadrons assigned into the group were the 104th Headquarters, 104th Material Squadron (Maintenance), 104th Combat Support Squadron, and the 104th USAF Dispensary.

In 1950, the unit was awarded the Spaatz Trophy based on its accomplishments in maintenance, personnel, training, safety, supply, and overall proficiency. Then, in 1951, the 131st Fighter Squadron underwent its first of eight conversions and flew the P- 51 Mustang Fighter for three years until the F-94 Starfire Fighter permanently put the 131st into the jet business. The Guard Base at Barnes Airport was dedicated on 19 October 1952.

In 1954 the 131st stood up a dawn-to-dusk air defense alert with its F-94 jets, a rotation of pilots, and a 10-person support crew (a precursor of things to come). In April 1956 came the organization as the 104th Fighter Group, from the previous squadron-hierarchy.

The mission of the 104th Fighter Group was the air defense of Massachusetts.

=== Tactical Air Command ===
The air defense mission ended on 10 November 1958 when the Massachusetts Air Guard and its units were reassigned to Tactical Air Command (TAC) and converted to F-86H Sabre fighter-bombers. During the 1950s and early 1960s, better training and equipment, and closer relations with the Air Force greatly improved the readiness of the Massachusetts Air National Guard.

==== 1961 Berlin Federalization ====
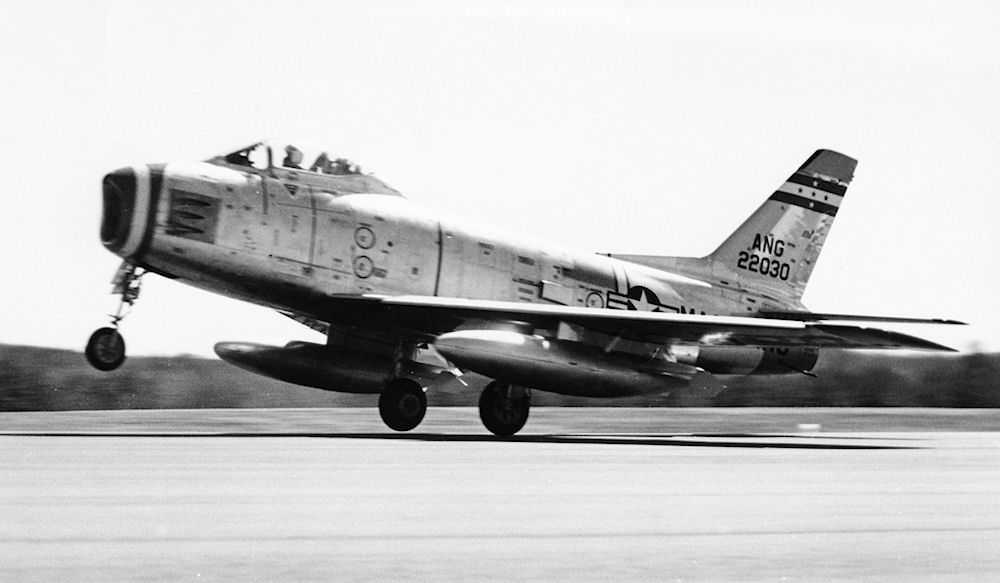
131st Tactical Fighter Squadron - North American F-86H Sabre 52-2030

During the summer of 1961, as the 1961 Berlin Crisis unfolded, the 131st TFS was notified on 16 August of its pending federalization and recall to active duty. On 1 October the 131st was federalized and 730 members were placed on active duty.

The mission was to reinforce the United States Air Forces in Europe (USAFE) and deploy to Phalsbourg-Bourscheid Air Base, France. In France, the unit was to provide close air support to NATO ground forces and air interdiction. This involved keeping its aircraft on 24/7 alert. Between 28 and 30 October, the Wing departed for Phalsbourg.

Starting on 5 December, the Wing began deploying to Wheelus Air Base Libya for gunnery training. During its time in Europe, the 104th participated in several USAF and NATO exercises, including a deployment to Leck Air Base, West Germany near the Danish border. At Leck, ground and support crews from both countries exchanged duties, learning how to perform aircraft maintenance and operational support tasks.

On 7 May 1962, USAFE Seventeenth Air Force directed that the 104th would deploy back to the United States during the summer, and the unit returned to the United States in July 1962. The last of the ANG aircraft departed on 20 July.

==== Vietnam era ====
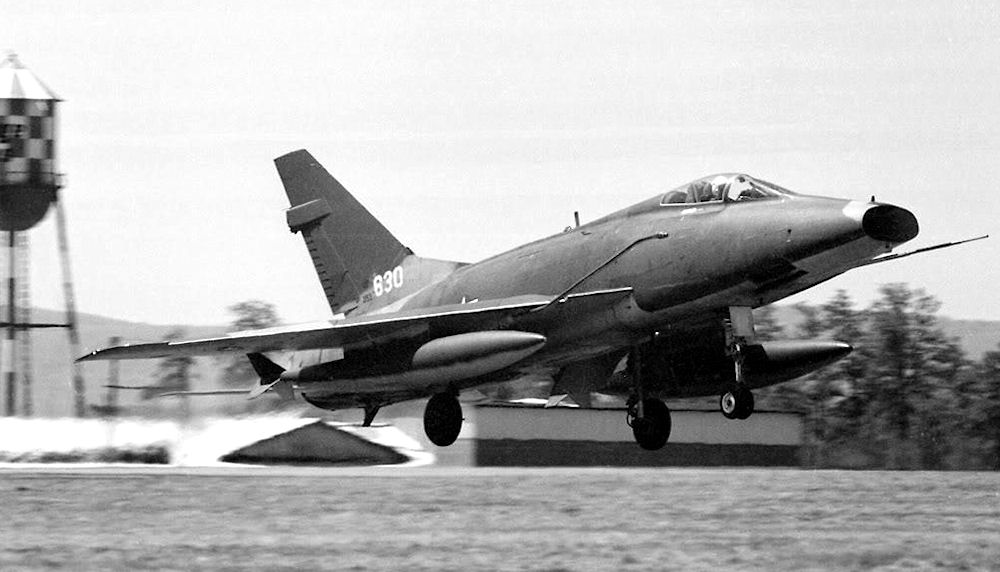
131st TFS F-100D 55-2830

After the Berlin Crisis, the readiness status of the 104th Tactical Fighter Group greatly improved under the "gaining command concept", whereby the U.S. Air Force Tactical Air Command was responsible for overseeing the training of the Group. Operational readiness inspections also honed the edges of the wing.

In 1964, the 131st TFS was switched from F-86H Sabres to the F-84F Thunderstreak. Exactly why this equipment change was made can not be determined. The F-86H was a viable aircraft in the ANG's inventory, with the Sabres from both the 101st and 131st TFS's being sent to the New Jersey ANG, and the 119th and 141st TFS's sending their F-84Fs to the Massachusetts squadrons. The 131st flew the Thunderstreaks throughout the 1960s, and although the squadron was not activated during the Vietnam War, several of its pilots volunteered for combat duty in Southeast Asia. In 1971, the 104th began re-equipping with the F-100D Super Sabre; the Air Guard was always one generation of fighter aircraft behind the Air Force during this time.

==== Close Air Support ====
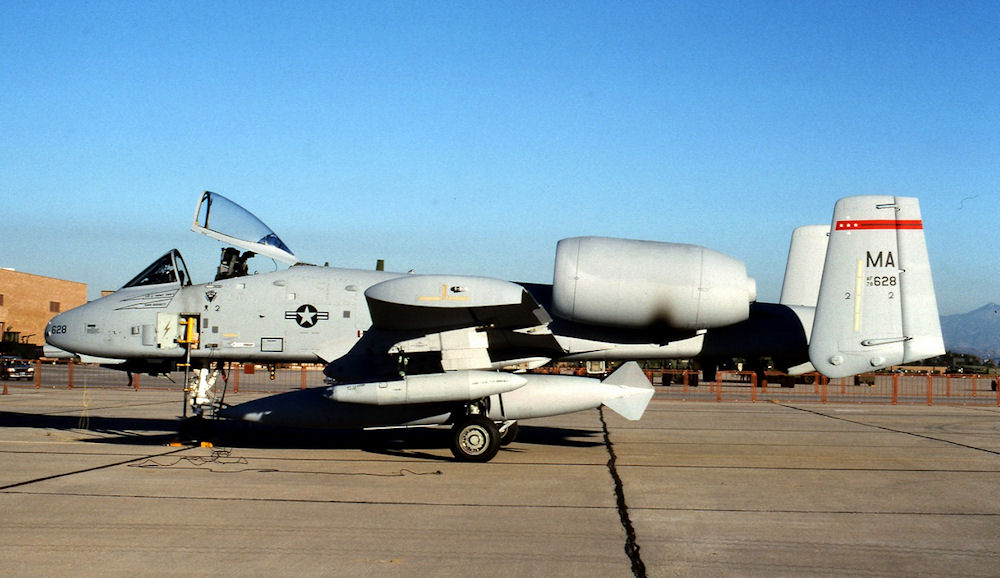
131st Tactical Fighter Squadron A-10 78-0628

The 104th remained as a tactical fighter unit flying the F-100 until July 1979 when the F-100s were retired and the unit was re-equipped with new A-10 Thunderbolt IIs as part of the "Total Force" concept which equipped ANG units with front-line USAF aircraft. This marked the first time the 131st had received new aircraft.

For most of its existence, the Air Guard had been a reserve force for use only in wartime. By the 1980s, the Air Guard was an integral part of daily Air Force operations. As a result, the Massachusetts Air Guard took on more missions. With the receipt of the A-10, the 104th began a commitment to the United States Air Forces in Europe (USAFE), beginning frequent deployments to West Germany, England, Italy, Turkey, and other NATO bases.

As the Cold War was ending, the Massachusetts Air National Guard was called upon to meet new challenges. Iraq's invasion of Kuwait in August 1990 led to a U.S. response with air, ground and naval attacks during Operation Desert Storm. While no flying units of the Massachusetts Air Guard were mobilized, mission support units provided personnel to backfill deploying Air Force units in the U.S. The Total Force Policy of the Department of Defense stipulated that the Reserve Components were to play a large role in the nation's defense.

=== Air Combat Command ===
In March 1992, with the end of the Cold War, the 104th adopted the Air Force Objective Organization plan, and the unit was redesignated the 104th Fighter Group. In June, Tactical Air Command was inactivated as part of the Air Force reorganization after the end of the Cold War. It was replaced by Air Combat Command (ACC). In 1995, in accordance with the Air Force "One Base-One Wing" directive, the 104th was redesignated the 104th Fighter Wing, and the 131st Fighter Squadron was assigned to the new 104th Operations Group.

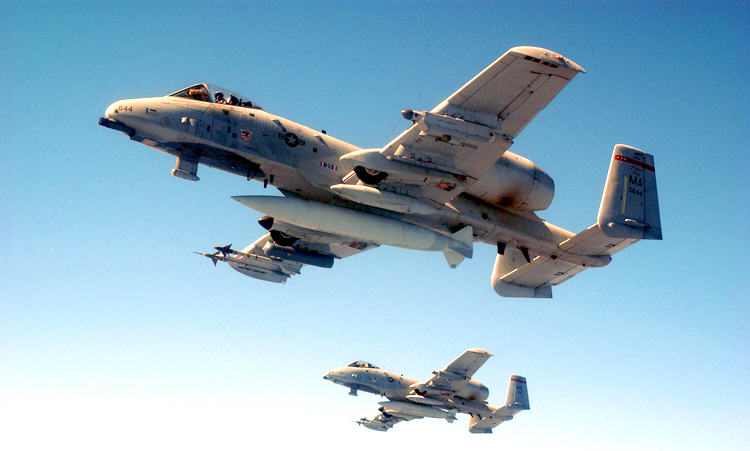
Two 131st Fighter Squadron A-10s in flight

From August to October 1995, some 400 Airmen of the 104th Fighter Wing deployed to Aviano Air Base, Italy as part of the NATO mission to repel Serbian forces in Bosnia. This was the first time that the 131st Fighter Squadron flew combat sorties. Four years later, in 1999, elements of the 104th mobilized and flew sorties over the skies of the former Republic of Yugoslavia. As part of an Air Guard A-10 group, the 131st attacked Serb forces in Kosovo.

In mid-1996, the Air Force, in response to budget cuts, and changing world situations, began experimenting with Air Expeditionary organizations. The Air Expeditionary Force (AEF) concept was developed that would mix Active-Duty, Reserve and Air National Guard elements into a combined force. Instead of entire permanent units deploying as "Provisional" as in the 1991 Gulf War, Expeditionary units are composed of "aviation packages" from several wings, including active-duty Air Force, the Air Force Reserve Command and the Air National Guard, would be married together to carry out the assigned deployment rotation.

As a result of the global war on terrorism, in 2003, the 131st Expeditionary Fighter Squadron flew hundreds of combat missions with the A-10 in support of U.S. Army and Marine operations in Afghanistan (Operation Enduring Freedom) and Iraq (Operation Iraqi Freedom). During March and April 2003, as part of Operation Iraqi Freedom, 131st Fighter Squadron A-10s supported the U.S. Army by flying combat missions that interdicted enemy forces. The 104th played a major role with its air support.

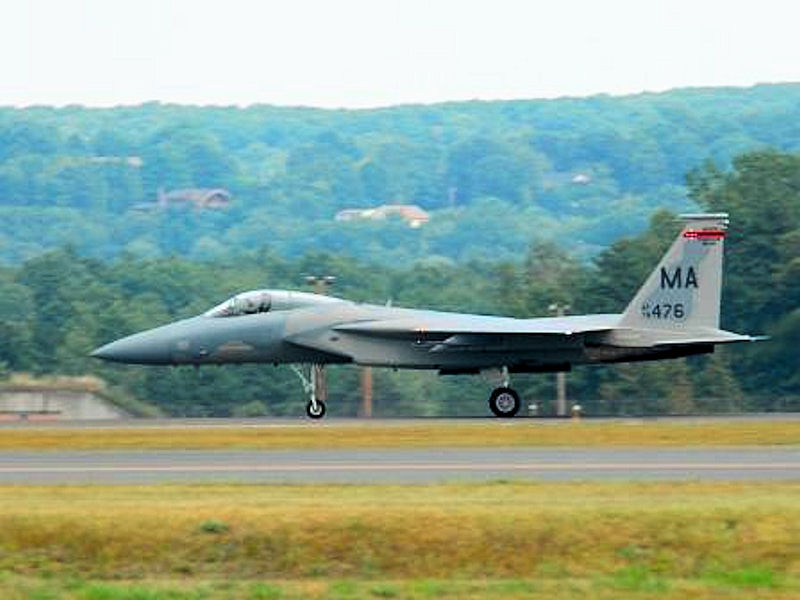
131st FS F-15C 78-0476

In its 2005 BRAC Recommendations, DoD recommended to Barnes Municipal Airport Air Guard Station and send its A-10s to the Maryland Air National Guard 104th Fighter Squadron, Warfield Air National Guard Base, Middle River, Maryland. In return, the 104th received the mission of the 102d Fighter Wing at Otis Air National Guard Base, which required converting from the A-10 to the F-15 Eagle. In turn, the 102nd converted into a non-flying Intelligence Wing. The realignment marked the end for the 104th's nearly 30-year mission of flying close-air support missions with the A-10. The 104th took over the homeland security mission of the 102d. In 2007, the A-10s began flying to Maryland and the F-15s began arriving from Otis ANGB. By the end of 2007, eighteen F-15C and a trainer F-15D arrived.

In addition to the air defense mission, the men and women of the 104th Fighter Wing deploy on Air Expeditionary missions to the Middle East in support of combat operations as part of Operation Enduring Freedom. The last such deployment was completed in July 2012.

In May 2013, it was announced that one third of the 104th Fighter Wing's F-15 aircraft would be moving to Otis Air National Guard Base to take up an alert mission for four to six-month, as Barnes' runway underwent renovation.

On 27 August 2014, a jet from the wing crashed into the ground near Elliot Knob, Virginia just before nine in the morning. The pilot, Lt. Col. Morris "Moose" Fontenot Jr., had reportedly made an emergency call before the crash and was on its way to Naval Air Station Joint Reserve Base New Orleans. Officials scoured George Washington National Forest in an attempt to find the pilot. It was later revealed that the pilot was unable to eject from the aircraft and was killed instantly.

On 4 February 2023, F-15s from the wing assisted Lockheed Martin F-22 Raptors of the 1st Fighter Wing in shadowing a Chinese spy balloon that had been floating southeastward over the continental United States for several days. One of the F-22s later shot down the balloon with an AIM-9X Sidewinder air-to-air missile over the Atlantic Ocean off the coast of South Carolina.

On 23 October 2025, the wing's last three F-15s left Barnes Air National Guard Base for the “boneyard” at Davis-Monthan Air Force Base. The wing received its first Lockheed Martin F-35 Lightning II on 13 September 2026.

== Lineage ==
- Established as the 104th Fighter Group (Air Defense) and allotted to the Air National Guard on 15 April 1956

Activated in the Massachusetts Air National Guard on 1 May 1956 and federally recognized
Redesignated 104th Tactical Fighter Group on 10 November 1958
Redesignated 104th Fighter Group on 15 March 1992
Redesignated 104th Fighter Wing on 1 October 1995

=== Assignments ===
Gaining Commands

Air Defense Command, 1 May 1956
Tactical Air Command, 10 November 1958
Air Combat Command, 1 June 1992 - present

=== Past Commanders ===
1956-1963 Brig. Gen. John J. Stefanik

1963–1970, Col. Edward D. Slasienski

1970–1973, Col. John J. Sevila

1973–1978, Col. Bruno J. Grabovsky

1978–1981, Col. Myrle B. Langley

1981–1986, Col. David R. Cummock

1986–1990, Col. Alan T. Reid

1990–1995, Maj. Gen. Richard A. Platt

1995–1997, Col. David W. Cherry

1997–1999, Col. Daniel P. Swift

1999–2005, Col. Michael Boulanger

2005–2008, Col. Marcel E. Kerdavid Jr.

2008–2012, Brig. Gen. Robert T. Brooks Jr.

2012–2016, Col. James J. Keefe

2017-June 2018, Col. James M. Suhr

June 2018 - June 2020, Col. Peter T. Green

June 2020 – June 2022, Col. William T. Bladen

June 2022 - December 2025, Col. David Halasi-Kun

December 2025 - Present, Col. Michael P. Glass

=== Components ===
- 104th Operations Group, 1 October 1995 – present
- 131st Fighter-Interceptor Squadron (later Tactical Fighter Squadron, Fighter Squadron), 1 May 1956 – 1 October 1995

=== Stations ===
- Barnes Municipal Airport (later Barnes Air National Guard Base), Massachusetts, 1 May 1956 – present

=== Aircraft ===
- P-47 Thunderbolt, 1947-1951
- P-51 Mustang, 1951-1954
- F-94-A-B Starfire, 1954-1957
- F-94-C Starfire, 1957-1958
- F-86H Sabre, 1957–1965
- F-84F Thunderstreak, 1965–1971
- F-100D Super Sabre, 1971–1979
- A-10 Thunderbolt II, 1979–2007
- F-15C Eagle, 2007–2025
- F-35A Lightning II, 2026
