= Massachusetts Air National Guard =

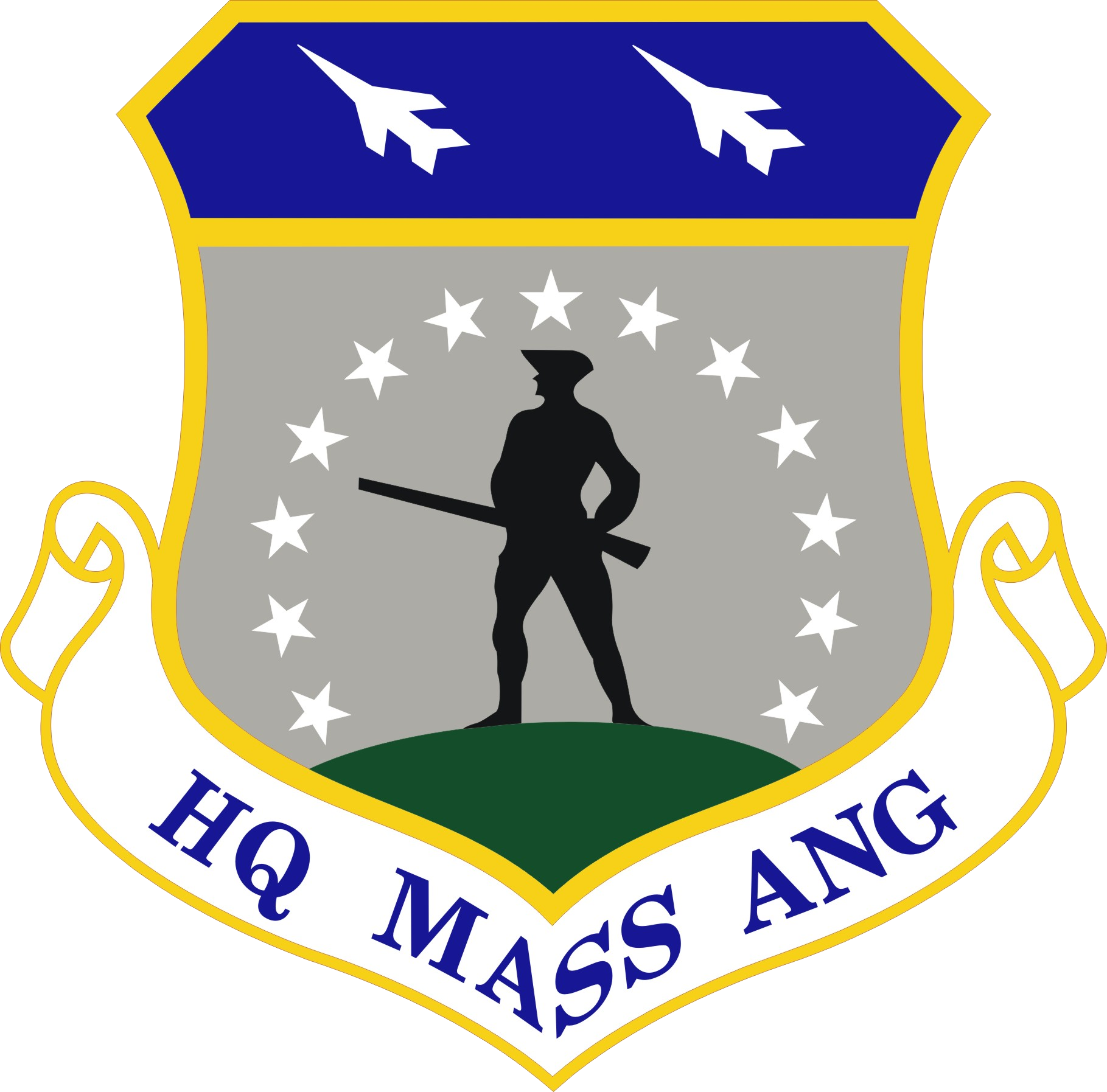
- Shield of the Massachusetts Air National Guard
- Active: 18 November 1921 – present
- Country: United States
- Allegiance: Massachusetts
- Branch: Air National Guard
- Type: State militia, military reserve force
- Role: "To meet commonwealth and federal mission responsibilities."
- Size: 18x F-15C 1x F-15D
- Part of: Massachusetts National Guard; United States National Guard Bureau
- Garrison/HQ: Hanscom Air Force Base, Massachusetts
- Mottos: Always Ready, Always There.
- Colors: Blue, Gray, Green, Yellow

Commanders
- Civilian leadership: President Donald Trump (Commander-in-Chief); Troy Meink (Secretary of the Air Force); Governor Maura Healey (Governor of the Commonwealth of Massachusetts and Commander-in-Chief of the Commonwealth of Massachusetts' Military Forces)
- Commonwealth military leadership: Major General Gary W. Keefe

Aircraft flown
- Fighter: F-15C Eagle F-15D Eagle

The Massachusetts Air National Guard (MA ANG) is the aerial militia of the Commonwealth of Massachusetts, United States of America. It is a reserve of the United States Air Force and, along with the Massachusetts Army National Guard, an element of the Massachusetts National Guard of the larger United States National Guard Bureau.

As commonwealth militia units, the units in the Massachusetts Air National Guard are not in the normal United States Air Force chain of command. They are under the jurisdiction of the governor of Massachusetts through the office of the Massachusetts Adjutant General unless they are federalized when ordered by the president of the United States. The Massachusetts Air National Guard is headquartered on Hanscom Air Force Base, Massachusetts, and its commander is Brigadier General Virginia I. Gaglio.

== Overview ==
Under the "Total Force" concept, Massachusetts Air National Guard units are considered to be Air Reserve Components (ARC) of the United States Air Force (USAF). Massachusetts ANG units are trained and equipped by the Air Force and are operationally gained by a major command of the USAF if federalized. In addition, the Massachusetts Air National Guard Airmen are assigned to Air Expeditionary Forces and are subject to deployment tasking orders along with their active duty and Air Force Reserve counterparts in their assigned cycle deployment window.

Along with their federal reserve obligations, as commonwealth militia units, the elements of the Massachusetts ANG are subject to being activated by order of the governor to provide protection of life and property and preserve peace, order, and public safety. State missions include disaster relief in times of earthquakes, hurricanes, floods and forest fires, search and rescue, protection of vital public services, and support to civil defense.

== Components ==
The Massachusetts Air National Guard consists of the following major units:

- 102nd Intelligence Wing

Established 18 November 1921 (as: 101st Observation Squadron), non-flying unit
Stationed at: Otis Air National Guard Base, Mashpee
Gained by: Air Force Intelligence, Surveillance and Reconnaissance Agency
Performs intelligence analysis of ISR data streaming from these sensors and fuse that information with other intelligence sources to provide war fighters timely, tailored, and actionable situational updates within minutes or seconds.

- 104th Fighter Wing

Established 24 February 1947 (as: 131st Fighter Squadron); operates: F-15C/D Eagle
Stationed at: Barnes Air National Guard Base, Westfield
Gained by: Air Combat Command
The 104th Fighter Wing supports Air Force wartime contingency requirements and performs a variety of peacetime missions required by the Air Force to include an active Air Sovereignty Alert presence and compatible mobilization readiness.

Support Unit Functions and Capabilities:

- 253rd Cyberspace Engineering Installation Group

Stationed at Otis Air National Guard Base, the old mission of the Headquarters 253d Cyberspace Engineering Installation Group was to train Airmen and be ready to deploy anywhere in the world on very short notice and provide quality communications and air traffic control services in support of Air Force requirements and other contingencies.

== History ==
The 131st Fighter Squadron was organized by Lyle E. Halstead and federally recognized in February 1947.

=== Leak of classified information ===
In April 2023, Jack Teixeira, a 21-year-old member of the intelligence wing of the Massachusetts Air National Guard at Otis Air National Guard Base, was arrested for unauthorized removal and transmission of classified US intelligence related to the Russian invasion of Ukraine. The airman 1st class joined the Air National Guard in 2019 as a Cyber Transport Systems Journeyman. The leaked documents, which first appeared in the since-deleted private Discord server "Thug Shaker Central" linked to Teixeira - who went by an online nickname of "OG" - contained estimated casualty counts of Russian forces and Ukrainian forces that deviated from publicly available information, straining relations with American allies and exposing weaknesses in the Ukrainian military. The arrest was conducted by a heavily armed FBI team at Teixeira's residence in North Dighton, Massachusetts. Teixeira pled guilty to six counts of willful retention and transmission of national defense under the Espionage Act information in federal court on March 4, 2024. The sentence carries between 11 and 17 years in federal prison. The situation revealed glaring security issues and mishandling of classified information, with investigations finding Teixeira had been warned after he was caught taking notes of sensitive information and concealing them in pockets, however was never officially reprimanded, and no notes were confiscated during the confrontation. The leaks contained pictures capturing classified documents, including aerial photography of the 2023 Chinese balloon incident, Ukrainian battle plans, and U.S. military intelligence assessments, as well as other hand-typed and annotated documents.

== See also ==
- Massachusetts National Guard
- Massachusetts State Defense Force
- Massachusetts Wing Civil Air Patrol
