= List of World War II aces credited with 7 victories =

Fighter aces in World War II had tremendously varying kill scores, affected as they were by many factors: the pilot's skill level, the performance of the airplane the pilot flew and the planes they flew against, how long they served, their opportunity to meet the enemy in the air (Allied to Axis disproportion), whether they were the formation's leader or a wingman, the standards their air service brought to the awarding of victory credits, et cetera.

== Aces ==
This background, along with the symbol "†", indicates that the pilot was killed in action, missing in action, died of wounds, or was killed in a flying accident during World War II.

Name	Country	Service(s)	Aerial victories	Other aerial victories	Notes
Joseph L. Lang	United States	U.S. Army Air Forces	7.83		
Everett W. Stewart	United States	U.S. Army Air Forces	7.83		(+1.5 ground kills)
John Latta †	Canada	Royal Air Force	7.5		
Józef Jeka	Poland	Polish Air Forces; Royal Air Force	7.5		
Henryk Pietrzak	Poland	Polish Air Forces; Royal Air Force	7.5		
Howard M. Burriss	United States	U.S. Navy	7.5		
Kenneth J. Dahms	United States	U.S. Navy	7.5		
John H. Lowell	United States	U.S. Army Air Forces	7.5		Acting commanding officer of 364th Fighter Group
Vermont Garrison	United States	U.S. Army Air Forces	7.3	+10 in Korean War	Ace in each of two wars
Noel le Chevalier Agazarian †	United Kingdom	Royal Air Force	7		
Calvin D. Allen	United States	U.S. Army Air Forces	7		52nd FG, 5th Fighter Squadron, ETO
Alfred Ambs	Germany	Luftwaffe	7		Jet ace with all victories in Me 262
Georg Christl	Germany	Luftwaffe	7		
Otto Stammberger	Germany	Luftwaffe	7		
William Y. Anderson	United States; Sweden	U.S. Army Air Forces	7		(+1 V-1 flying bomb)
Karl-Heinz Becker	Germany	Luftwaffe	7		Jet ace with all victories in Me 262
Rolf Arne Berg †	Norway	Royal Air Force	7		
Frederick E. Bakutis	United States	U.S. Navy	7		
Marian Bełc	Poland	Polish Air Force; Royal Air Force	7		
Harry W. Brown	United States	U.S. Army Air Forces	7		
Walter Churchill †	United Kingdom	Royal Air Force	7		
Claude J. Crenshaw	United States	U.S. Army Air Forces	7		(+ 3 on the Ground) Crewshaw shot down 4 Fw 190 in one day with three working MG
Liu Chui-Kang / Liu Cuigang	China	Chinese Nationalist Air Force	7		
Henry Davidson †	United Kingdom	Royal Air Force	7		
George Andrew Davis Jr.	United States	U.S. Army Air Forces	7	+21 in Korean War	Ace in each of two wars, awarded (posthumously) Medal of Honor for action in Korea
Gus A. Daymond	United States	U.S. Army Air Forces	7		4th FG, 334th Fighter Squadron, ETO
Furio Niclot Doglio	Kingdom of Italy	Regia Aeronautica	7		
Bolesław Drobiński	Poland	Polish Air Force; Royal Air Force	7		
Helmut Eberspächer	Germany	Luftwaffe	7		
Hugh C. Godefroy	Netherlands; Canada	Royal Air Force; Royal Canadian Air Force	7		
Athol Forbes	United Kingdom	Royal Air Force	7		(+2 shared)
Edward Gracie †	United Kingdom	Royal Air Force	7		(+3 shared)
Gordon M. Graham	United States	U.S. Army Air Forces	7		(+9.5 ground kills)
Roger Haberman	United States	U.S. Marine Corps	7		
Erwin Hentschel †	Germany	Luftwaffe	7		rear gunner of Hans-Ulrich Rudel (October 1941 – March 1944)
Pál Irányi	Hungary	Royal Hungarian Air Force	7		
Václav Jícha †	Czechoslovakia	Royal Air Force	7		
Stanisław Karubin	Poland	Polish Air Force; Royal Air Force	7		
Konstantin Kokkinaki	Soviet Union	Soviet Air Forces	7	+7 in Second Sino-Japanese War	Ace in each of two wars
Franz Köster	Germany	Luftwaffe	7		Jet ace with all victories in Me 262
Otmar Kučera	Czechoslovakia	Royal Air Force	7		
Walter Lawson †	United Kingdom	Royal Air Force	7		
Warren R. Lewis	United States	U.S. Army Air Forces	7	5 Probable	P-38J New Guinea
Béla Lipcsey	Hungary	Luftwaffe	7		
Donald MacFadyen	Canada	Royal Canadian Air Force	7		
Bert W. Marshall, Jr.	United States	U.S. Army Air Forces	7		(+4 ground kills)
Iosif Moraru	Kingdom of Romania	Royal Romanian Air Force	7		
Liviu Muresan	Kingdom of Romania	Royal Romanian Air Force	7		
Giuseppe Oblach	Kingdom of Italy	Regia Aeronautica	7		
Edward "Butch" O'Hare †	United States	U.S. Navy	7		
Sammy A. Pierce	United States	U.S. Army Air Forces	7		
Stanislav Plzák †	Czechoslovakia	Royal Air Force	7		
Constantin Pomut	Kingdom of Romania	Royal Romanian Air Force	7		
Edward Popek	United States	United States Army Air Forces	7		Completed in 2 hours
Gordon Raphael †	Canada	Royal Air Force	7		(+2 V-1 flying bombs)
Arval J. Roberson	United States	U.S. Army Air Forces	7		(+1 ground kill)
Desmond Ruchwaldy	United Kingdom	Royal Air Force	7		+ 10 V-1 flying bombs
Ferruccio Serafini	Kingdom of Italy	Regia Aeronautica	7		
John Shaw	United Kingdom	Royal Air Force	7		
Ernest Shipman	United States	U.S. Army Air Forces	7		
Noel Stansfeld	Canada	Royal Air Force	7		
Parsifal Stefanescu	Kingdom of Romania	Royal Romanian Air Force	7		
Kálmán Szeverényi †	Hungary	Royal Hungarian Air Force	7		
Norman Taylor	United Kingdom	Royal Air Force	7		
Richard Trousdale	New Zealand	Royal Air Force	7		
György Ujszászy	Hungary	Royal Hungarian Air Force	7		
Arthur Umbers †	New Zealand	Royal Air Force	7		(+28 V1 Flying Bombs and 10 ground kills)
Tomáš Vybíral	Czechoslovakia	Royal Air Force	7		
Samual Wicker	United States	U.S. Army Air Forces	7		364th Fighter Squadron, ETO
Sydney S. Woods	United States	U.S. Army Air Forces	7		
Robert E. Woody	United States	U.S. Army Air Forces	7		(+2 ground kills)
Michael Young	United Kingdom	Royal Air Force	7	+6 shared	
