= Sidney Wood (disambiguation) =

Sidney Wood (1911–2009) was an American tennis player.

It may also refer to:

- Sid Wood (footballer), English footballer
- Sidney Wood (phonetician) (born 1934), Swedish phonetician

== See also ==
- Sidney S. Woods
- Sydney Woods (politician)
- Sidley Wood
