= Texas Tower 4 =

Radar station of the United States Air Force

Texas Tower 4
- Part of Air Defense Command (ADC)
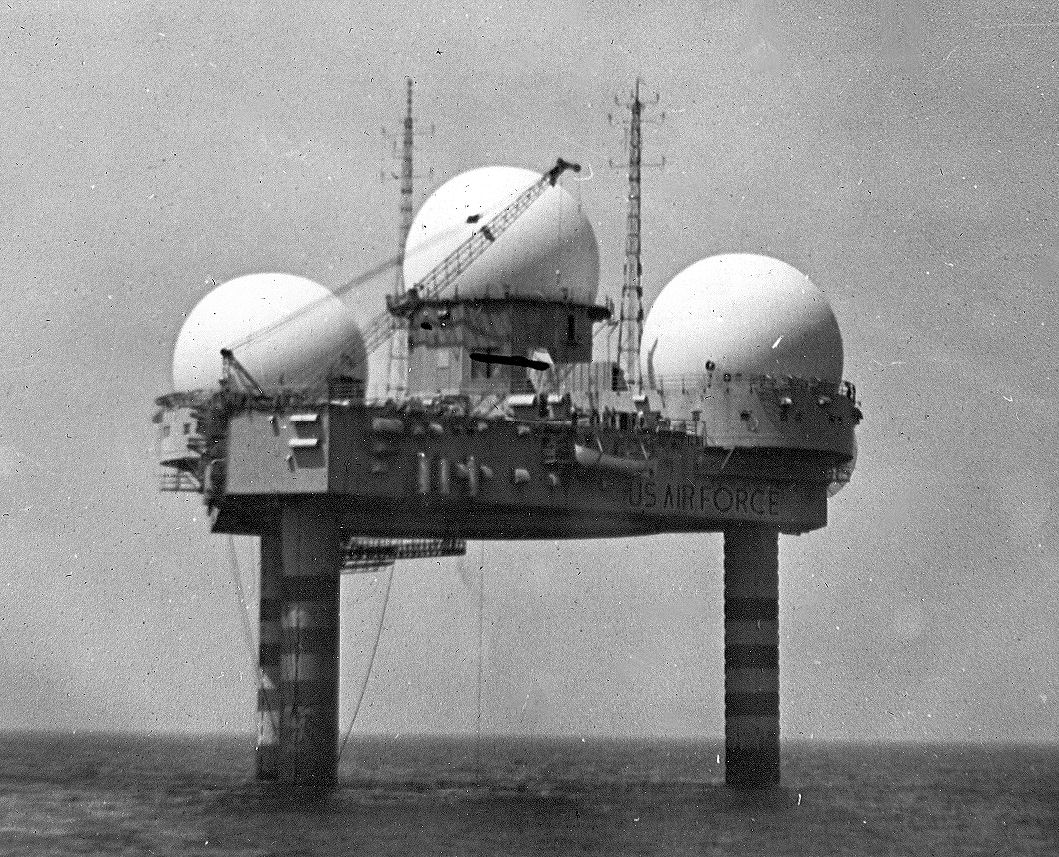
- Image of Texas Tower 4

Site information
- Type: Offshore air defense radar

Location
- Location
- Coordinates: 39°48′N 72°40′W

Site history
- Built: 1956-1958
- Built by: United States Air Force
- In use: 1958–1961
- Materials: Steel
- Fate: Collapsed 15 January 1961
- Events: All 28 crewmen lost in collapse

Garrison information
- Past commanders: Gordon (Larry) T. Phelan

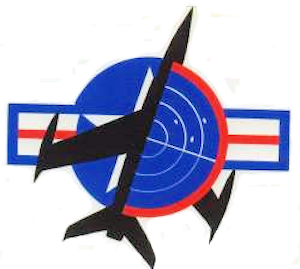
646th Radar Squadron

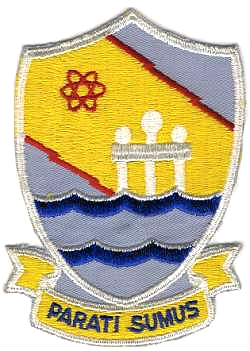
4604th Support Squadron

Texas Tower 4 (ADC ID: TT-4) was a United States Air Force Texas Towers General Surveillance Radar station, located 63 miles (101 km) south-southeast off the coast of Long Island, New York in 185 feet (56 m) of water. Hurricane Donna struck the tower in September 1960, seriously damaging it. The tower was the site of an accident and was destroyed by a winter storm on January 15, 1961. None of the 28 airmen and civilian contractors who were manning the station survived.

Texas Tower 4 was one in a series of manned radar stations called "Texas Towers" because they resembled the oil-drilling platforms of the Gulf of Mexico. Air Defense Command (ADC) estimated that the Texas Towers would help extend contiguous East Coast radar coverage some 300 to 500 miles seaward. This would provide the United States with an extra 30 minutes of warning time in the event of an incoming bomber attack by the Soviet Union.

== History ==
=== Early history ===
Texas Tower 4 began construction in December 1956 in South Portland, Maine, after construction was awarded to J. Rich Steers, Inc. of New York City in collaboration with Morrison-Knudsen, Inc., of Boise, Idaho. On 28 June 1957, it was successfully floated and towed to its site and erected. During transportation, two or three structural supports were dislodged in rough seas. The Air Force considered two options: whether to fix the problem before or after erecting the radar platform. The latter was chosen, which affected the structural integrity of the platform.

In 1958, enough of the structure was complete that one AN/FPS-3 search radar and two AN/FPS-6 height finder radars developed by Air Force Rome Air Development Center [RADC] New York, were installed.

=== Use ===
Personnel from the 646th Radar Squadron, stationed at Highlands Air Force Station, NJ operated the tower. The 4604th Support Squadron (Texas Towers) at Otis AFB, MA provided logistical support. The Tower communicated with the Highlands Air Force Station via the AN/FRC-56 Tropospheric scatter communications system. Originally 70 personnel manned the station under the command of Lieutenant Colonel Robert Cutler. Life aboard Texas Tower 4 was difficult. Both the structure and its crew suffered from the near-constant vibration caused by rotating radar antennas and diesel generators. The surrounding ocean and tower footings also transmitted distant sounds along the steel legs, amplifying them throughout the entire structure.

By early 1961, the crew had been reduced to 14 Air Force personnel and 14 repairmen due to concerns over the inability of successive repair crews to halt the movement of the structure. Prior to the collapse, the tower had weathered two cyclones over a two-year period.

=== Collapse and investigation ===
Texas Tower 4 suffered severe structural damage during Hurricane Donna in September 1960, resulting in the decision to reduce the crew to 28 people. By January 1961, the tower's commanding officer, Captain Gordon Phelan, made repeated requests to evacuate the tower completely, but this was rejected on grounds that the station was constantly monitored by Soviet ships, and abandoning it would enable the Soviets to board it and capture its highly advanced radar equipment. Finally, at 16:00 on 15 January, after receiving numerous reports of serious damage to the station throughout the day, the Air Force authorized full evacuation of Texas Tower 4. With a heavy storm making helicopter operations impossible, Navy and Coast Guard ships were dispatched to the station. At 18:45, the station sent out a distress call reporting "We're breaking up". None of the approaching ships reached it in time, and it vanished from radar contact at approximately 19:20. The tower had collapsed into the sea, taking the lives of all 28 airmen and civilian contractors who were manning the station. Only two bodies were recovered.

A Board of Inquiry was convened at Otis Air Force Base. Colonel William M. Banks, then acting commander of the Boston Air Defense sector, was charged with involuntary manslaughter along with two other officers, commanding officer Major William R. Sheppard and executive officer Major Reginald L. Starke, of the 4604th Air Support Squadron, were charged with dereliction of duty. Charges against Sheppard and Starke were dropped in June 1961. A court martial board dismissed all charges against Colonel Banks on 24 August 1961.

In May 1961, hearings chaired by Senator John C. Stennis on the collapse of the tower were held before the Preparedness Investigating Subcommittee of the United States Senate Committee on Armed Services. The committee concluded that human error, on the part of engineers, building contractors, the Air Force and the Navy, was responsible for the accident. The Navy was mentioned for its supervision of the construction and repair of the tower. However, General LeMay, commanding general of the entire Air Force, disagreed with the courts martial believing Colonel Banks had failed in his duties.

== Current status ==
Today the wreckage of Texas Tower 4 remains at the bottom of the ocean, and has become a site for scuba diving. However, its depth of about 185 feet (56 m) limits access to the wreckage to divers with specialized training and equipment.

The site is also the location of a National Oceanic and Atmospheric Administration buoy.

== Units and assignments ==
Units:

- 646th Radar Squadron (Flight), (Operations unit based at Highlands AFS, NJ), 1 April 1959 – 15 January 1961
- 4604th Support Squadron (Texas Towers) (Logistics support unit based at Otis AFB, MA), 1 April 1959 – 15 January 1961

Assignments:

- Boston Air Defense Sector, 1 April 1959 – 15 January 1961

== See also ==
- List of USAF Aerospace Defense Command General Surveillance Radar Stations
