= Texas Tower 1 =

Proposed U.S. Air Force radar station

- Part of Aerospace Defense Command

Site information
- Type: Long Range Radar Site
- Owner: U.S. Air Force

Location
- Coordinates: 42°53′N 68°57′W

Site history
- Built by: U.S. Government

Texas Tower 1 was a planned Texas Tower that was to be located on Cashes Ledge, 100 miles (160 km) off the coast of New Hampshire in 36 feet (11 m) of water. The 4604th Support Group, Otis Air Force Base, Massachusetts was supported by nearby Pease Air Force Base. The United States Air Force approved the construction of Tower #1 on January 11, 1954, but the tower was never completed because of improvements to radar over the area.
