= Texas Tower 2 =

Former U.S. Air Force radar station

Texas Tower 2
- Part of Air Defense Command (ADC)
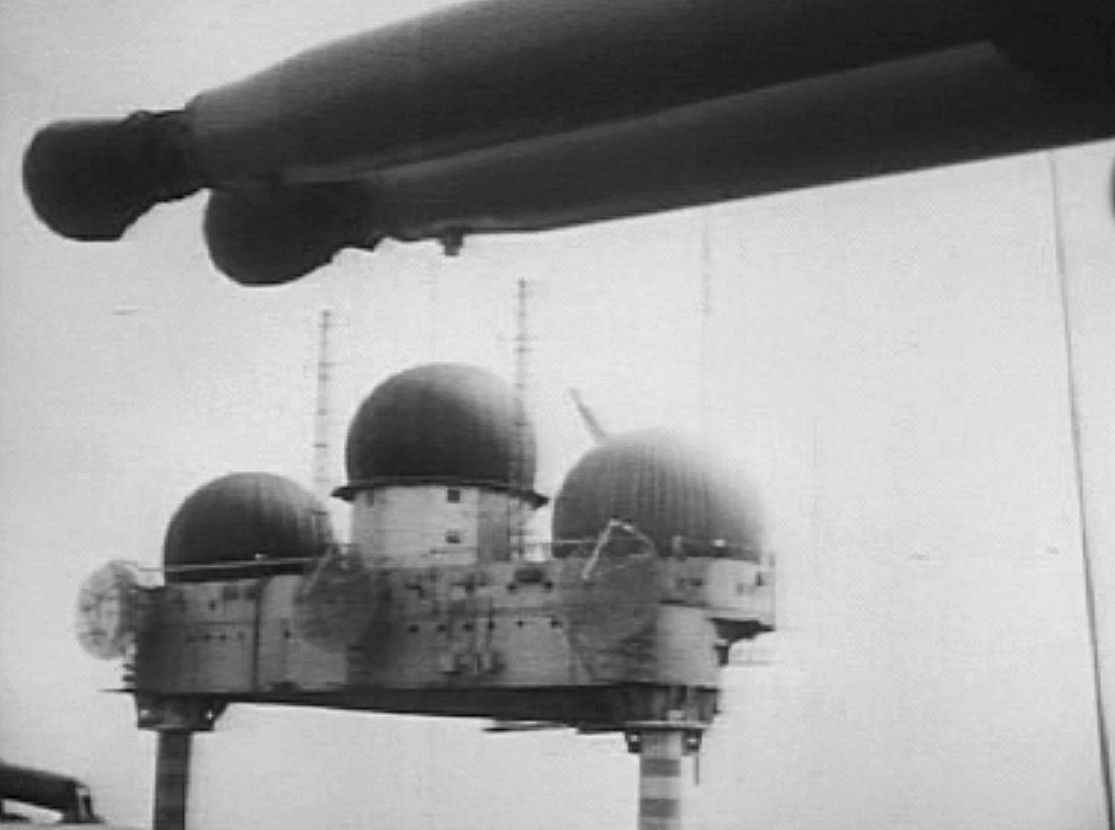
- Image of Texas Tower 2

Site information
- Type: Long Range Radar Site
- Open to the public: No

Location
- Location
- Coordinates: 41°45′0.00″N 67°46′0.00″W

Site history
- Built by: United States Air Force
- In use: 1958-1963
- Demolished: 1963

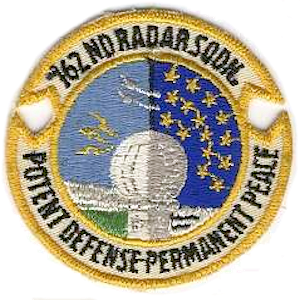
762d Radar Squadron

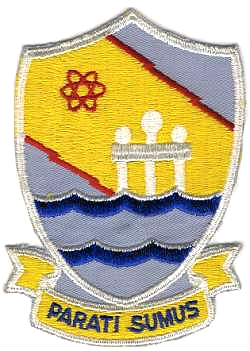
4604th Support Squadron

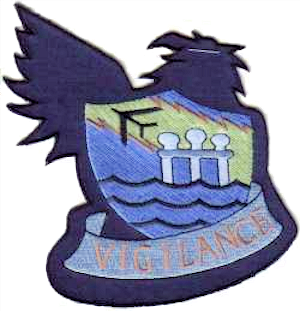
Texas Tower 2 emblem

Texas Tower 2 (ADC ID: TT-2) was a former United States Air Force Texas Tower General Surveillance Radar station, first operational in 1955. It was located 110 miles (180 km) east of Cape Cod, Massachusetts, in 56 feet (17 m) of water. The tower was closed in 1963 and dismantled.

Located on Georges Bank, Texas Tower 2 was one in a series of staffed radar stations that were so named because they resembled the oil-drilling platforms of the Gulf of Mexico. Air Defense Command (ADC) estimated that the Texas Towers would help extend contiguous East Coast radar coverage some 300 to 500 miles (480 to 800 km) seaward. In terms of Soviet military capabilities, this would provide the United States with an extra 30 minutes of warning time in the event of an incoming bomber attack.

== History ==
Texas Tower 2 began construction in 1955 at Fore River Shipyard in Quincy, Massachusetts. In June 1955, it was successfully floated and towed to its site east of Cape Cod. Beginning in December 1955 enough of the structure was complete that one AN/FPS-3 search radar and two AN/FPS-6 height finder radars developed by Air Force Rome Air Development Center in Rome, New York, were installed.

Personnel from the 762d Aircraft Control and Warning Squadron, stationed at North Truro Air Force Station, MA operated the tower. It was staffed by a crew of 6 officers and 48 airmen. The 4604th Support Squadron (Texas Towers) at Otis AFB (now Otis Air National Guard Base) provided logistical support. Life aboard Texas Tower 2 was difficult. Both the structure and its crew suffered from the near-constant vibration caused by rotating radar antennas and diesel generators. The surrounding ocean and tower footings also transmitted distant sounds along the steel legs, amplifying them throughout the entire structure.

With the advent of Soviet ICBMs and reduced threat of bombers, the tower was decommissioned in 1963 and demolished shortly thereafter.

During the demolition, the remains of the tower sank to the sea floor. It remains there and has become a site for scuba diving.

== Units and assignments ==
Units:

- 762d Aircraft Control and Warning Squadron (Flight), (Operations unit based at North Truro AFS, MA), May 1956-15 January 1963
- 4604th Support Squadron (Texas Towers) (Logistics support unit based at Otis AFB, MA), May 1956-15 January 1963

Assignments:

- 4704th Defense Wing, May 1956
- 4622d Air Defense Wing, 18 October 1956
- Boston Air Defense Sector, 8 January 1957 – 15 January 1963

== See also ==
- List of USAF Aerospace Defense Command General Surveillance Radar Stations
