= John Latta =

John Latta may refer to:

- John Latta (politician) (1836–1913), Lieutenant Governor of Pennsylvania, 1875–1879
- Sir John Latta, 1st Baronet (1867–1946), Scottish shipping magnate
- John Latta (RAF officer) (1914–1941), Canadian-born flying ace of the Royal Air Force
