= Texas Tower 3 =

United States Air Force radar station

Texas Tower 3
- Part of Air Defense Command (ADC)
- Nantucket shoals
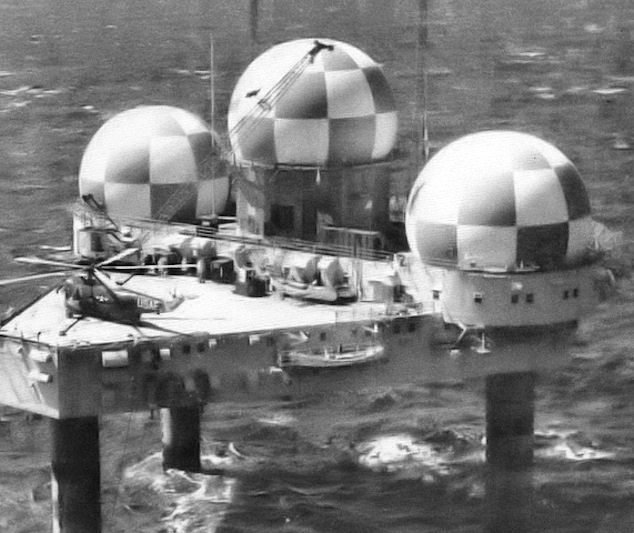
- Image of Texas Tower 3

Site information
- Type: Long Range Radar Site
- Open to the public: No

Location
- Location
- Coordinates: 40°45′00.00″N 69°19′0.00″W

Site history
- Built by: United States Air Force
- In use: 1958-1963
- Demolished: 1963

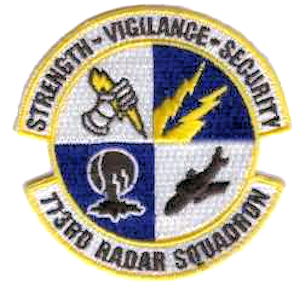
773d Radar Squadron

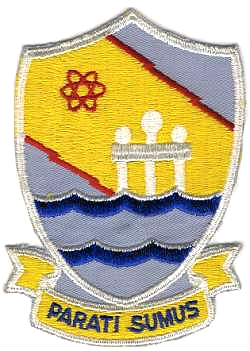
4604th Support Squadron

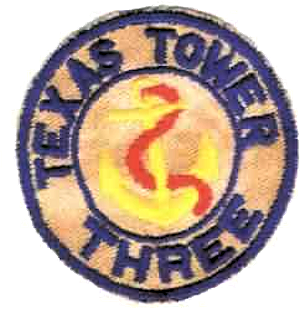
Texas Tower 3 emblem

Texas Tower 3 (ADC ID: TT-3) was a former United States Air Force Texas Tower General Surveillance Radar station, first operational in November 1956. The radar station was 50 miles (80 km) southeast of the coast of Nantucket, Massachusetts, in 80 feet of water. The tower was closed in 1963 and dismantled.

Located in Nantucket Shoals, Texas Tower 3 was one in a series of crewed radar stations that were so named because they resembled the oil-drilling platforms of the Gulf of Mexico. Air Defense Command (ADC) estimated that the Texas Towers would help extend contiguous East Coast radar coverage some 300 to 500 miles seaward. In terms of Soviet military capabilities, this would provide the United States with an extra 30 minutes of warning time in the event of an incoming bomber attack.

== History ==
Texas Tower 3 was constructed in 1956 at the former WWII New England Shipbuilding Corp. East Yard "basin" in South Portland, Maine. [Contrary to many false reports Tower 3 was not built at the Fore River Shipyard in Quincy, Massachusetts. Only Tower 2 was built at Quincy. Some confusion might have arisen due to the odd coincidence that both shipyards were located, at least partially, on rivers with identical names.]

On 7 August 1956, it was successfully floated and towed to its site and erected. Beginning in November 1956 enough of the structure was complete that one AN/FPS-3 search radar and two AN/FPS-6 height finder radars developed by Air Force Rome Air Development Center [RADC] New York, were installed.

Personnel from the 773d Radar Squadron, stationed at Montauk Air Force Station, NY were responsible for operation of the tower. It was crewed by 6 officers and 48 airmen. The 4604th Support Squadron (Texas Towers) at Otis AFB, MA provided logistical support. Life aboard Texas Tower 3 was difficult. Both the structure and its crew suffered from the near-constant vibration caused by rotating radar antennas and diesel generators. The surrounding ocean and tower footings also transmitted distant sounds along the steel legs, amplifying them throughout the entire structure.

With the advent of Soviet ICBMs and the bomber threat reduced in importance, the tower was decommissioned in 1963 and demolished shortly thereafter.

In August, 1964 Texas Tower 3 was blown off of its supports and towed to the Federal Yards of the Lipsett Division of Luria Brothers Inc in Kearny, NJ. The platform was proposed for re-purposing possibly as a loading dock or as a drilling platform. It was the only Texas Tower recovered from the ocean.

== Units and assignments ==
Units:

- 773d Radar Squadron (Flight), (Operations unit based at Montauk AFS, NY), 1 June 1958 – 25 March 1963
- 4604th Support Squadron (Texas Towers) (Logistics support unit based at Otis AFB, MA), 1 June 1958 – 25 March 1963

Assignments:

- New York Air Defense Sector, 1 June 1958 – 25 March 1963

== See also ==
- List of USAF Aerospace Defense Command General Surveillance Radar Stations
