= Flight 175 (disambiguation) =

Flight 175 often refers to United Airlines Flight 175, hijacked on 11 September 2001 as part of the September 11 attacks.

Flight 175 may also refer to:

Listed chronologically

- Eastern Air Lines Flight 175, hijacked on 5 May 1972
- Korean Air Flight 175, crashed on 25 November 1989
- Flight 175: As the World Watched, an American television documentary film about the 2001 hijacking, released in 2006
