= 551st United States Air Force Hospital =

Former U.S. military hospital

Coordinates: 41°39′59.10″N 70°34′9.40″W

Williams Hospital
- United States Air Force

Geography
- Location: Otis Air Force Base, Massachusetts, United States

Organization
- Type: Military

History
- Constructed: 1936
- Closed: 1973
- Demolished: 2019

Links
- Lists: Hospitals in Massachusetts

Williams Hospital (also known as 551st United States Air Force Hospital, Otis Hospital, or locally as Building 322) was a United States Armed Forces hospital located within the former Otis Air Force Base on Cape Cod in Massachusetts. The hospital is believed to have closed along with the closure of the base itself between 1970 and 1973. The building was demolished in 2019.

During World War II, the hospital saw a number of wounded soldiers brought back from Europe.

The hospital was the site of the birth of Patrick Bouvier Kennedy, son of U.S. President John F. Kennedy and First Lady Jacqueline Kennedy, who was born premature and died two days later.

== See also ==
- List of military installations in Massachusetts
