= Edward S. Popek =

American flying ace (1919–?)

Colonel Edward Popek
- Born: Edward Stanley Popek; October 4, 1919; Hackensack, New Jersey, US
- Allegiance: United States
- Branch: United States Army Air Force
- Service years: 1933–1970
- Rank: First lieutenant
- Known for: 7 confirmed kills in 2 hours
- Conflicts: World War II; Battle of Biak

Colonel Edward Stanley Popek (October 4, 1919 – ?) was an American flying ace and first lieutenant who served the Fifth Air Force of the United States Army Air Force during World War II. He has been credited with seven kills during his service with the military.

== Early life ==
Popek was born on October 4, 1919, in Hackensack, New Jersey. When he was a teenager, he and his brother restored a Waco 10 biplane. At age 14, he successfully soloed a flight, before receiving his pilot license at age 15.

== Military career ==
Popek served in the Fifth Air Force of the United States Army Air Force during World War II. He fought in the Pacific Theater. As first lieutenant, he commanded the 348th Fighter group through the Philippines and China. Popek received the status of flying ace after downing three airplanes with his North American P-51 Mustang near Biak. He only served two tours of duty.

After World War II, served in the United States Air Force until 1970, retiring as a colonel.

== See also ==
- List of World War II aces credited with 7 victories
- List of World War II aces from the United States
