= 4604th Support Squadron =

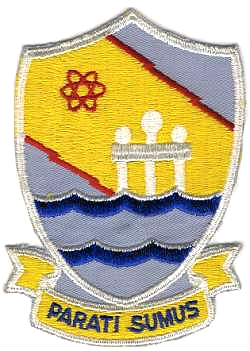
- Emblem of the 4604th Support Squadron
- Active: 1956–1963
- Country: United States
- Branch: United States Air Force
- Type: Logistical support unit
- Motto(s): Parati Sumus (Lat., "We Are Prepared")

The 4604th Support Squadron (Texas Towers) is an inactive United States Air Force unit. It was last assigned to the 26th Air Division, Aerospace Defense Command, stationed at Otis Air Force Base, Massachusetts. It was inactivated on 1 July 1963.

The mission of the squadron was to provide logistical support to the Texas Tower radar stations located offshore in the Atlantic Ocean.

The squadron was activated as the 4604th Aircraft Control and Warning Squadron on 8 October 1956 by the 26th AD at Otis AFB. It was re-designated as the 4604th Support Squadron (Texas Towers) on 1 December 1956.

The squadron operated helicopters for personnel transport to and from the towers and Otis Air Force Base. It also coordinated with the Military Sea Transport Service the use of the USNS New Bedford (TAKL-17) and two smaller vessels for carrying cargo such as fuel oil, aviation gasoline, food and other material. It also was capable of transporting up to 76 personnel when necessary to and from the port of New Bedford.

With the end of the Texas Tower project, the squadron was discontinued on 1 July 1963.

== See also ==
- Texas Tower 2
- Texas Tower 3
- Texas Tower 4
