= Ruth Allen (singer) =

English musician

- Also known as: Ronnie Graham
- Born: London, England
- Genres: Cabaret, jazz
- Occupations: Cabaret artist, singer
- Years active: 20th century–present

Ruth Allen is a London born cabaret artist and singer. She initially performed under the stage name Ronnie Graham, in venues such as the chic Astor Club in Berkeley Square, where, as top of the bill, she performed for an unprecedented year-long residency. Her continuing success took her to Paris, where she performed at the famous jazz venue the Mars Club and met the legendary Billie Holiday.

== Brief career ==
During her year at the Astor she married an American aviator and returned with him to the United States. Whilst living at Otis Air National Guard Base on Cape Cod, Ruth heard that Duke Ellington was to appear at the base with his big band. She met with him and he invited her to go to New York with a view to getting a record deal. Ruth's husband drove her to Columbia Records studios in New York where she cut a dozen 'audition' tracks. She was also offered to start a tour across the States to promote her records, but refused due to her family responsibilities.

After an extended period back in London, performing in the prestigious American Bar at the Savoy Hotel, Ruth has returned to the States and is living just outside New York City. Her songs and her singing style are unmistakably American. Since returning to the States, Ruth has appeared at Carnegie Hall for Michael Feinstein, as well as the Mabel Mercer Foundation Cabaret Convention.

Ruth recorded three albums: The Ruth Allen Songbook, Head To Head and January Butterfly.

== Discography ==
- January Butterfly
- Head To Head
- The Ruth Allen Songbook
