= Flight 175: As the World Watched =

- Genre: Documentary; Aviation
- Country of origin: United States
- Original language: English

Production
- Running time: 45 minutes

Original release
- Network: TLC
- Release: 2006

Flight 175: As the World Watched is an American television documentary film. It covers the final moments of the passengers and crew on board United Airlines Flight 175, which was the second commercial airliner to strike the World Trade Center, impacting with the South Tower during the September 11 attacks.

The documentary features interviews with a variety of people, including:

- relatives of the passengers and crew members, some of whom received final phone calls from their loved ones,
- air traffic controllers who responded to the aircraft, and
- the two F-15 fighter pilots scrambled from Otis Air National Guard Base who flew in the airspace over Lower Manhattan during the event.
- music from composer Carl Schroeder, who wrote "Christine's Lullaby", in honor of Christine Lee Hanson, a passenger on the jet, and at age 2, the terrorists' youngest victim.
