= Arval J. Roberson =

American Air Force officer

- Born: November 14, 1923; Crown Pt., Indiana, US
- Died: December 7, 2007 (aged 84); Kilmarnock, Virginia, US
- Burial place: Cape Cod, Massachusetts, US
- Military career
- Allegiance: United States
- Branch: United States Air Force
- Service years: 1942-1973
- Rank: Colonel
- Nickname: Robie
- Commands: 362nd Fighter Squadron
- Conflicts: World War II; Korean War; Vietnam War
- Awards: Distinguished Flying Cross; Bronze Star Medal

Arval J. Roberson (1923–2007) was a United States Air Force officer who was a fighter ace during World War II with the 362nd Fighter Squadron and the last commander of Otis Air Force Base.
