= Sidney Wood (phonetician) =

Swedish phonetician (born 1934)

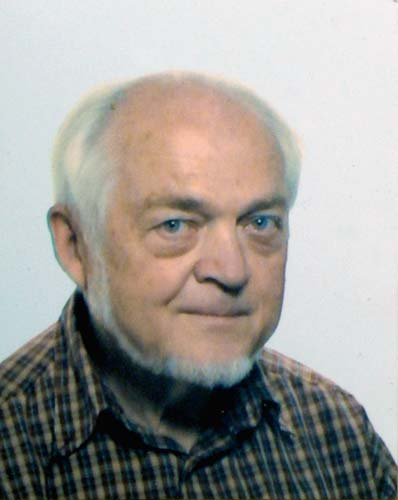
- Born: 12 April 1934 (age 92); Isle of Sheppey, UK
- Occupation: Phonetician

Sidney Wood is a British-born retired Swedish phonetician and Research Fellow (docent).

== Research ==
Wood’s research, based on X-ray motion films of speech (Regional Southern British English, South Swedish, Bulgarian, Colloquial Cairo Arabic, West Greenlandic Inuit) and vocal tract modelling, is widely cited. It is devoted to the following topics:

- vowel production
- vowel phonology: Bulgarian, Kabardian, West Greenlandic
- the gestural structure of syllables
- articulator timing and coarticulation

His most significant findings are:

- four constriction locations for monophthongs (hard palate, velum, upper pharynx and lower pharynx)
- the upper pharyngeal location of uvular consonants originally hypothesized from CV spectral transitions.

More recently, his research focus turned towards British regional pronunciations, especially southeastern accents of Southern British English (SBE), including sound change in Received Pronunciation. Wood has been involved in a significant theoretical controversy concerning the validity of the Bell vowel model and the legitimacy of using X-ray films to contradict it. He argued that critical functions of the model are contradicted by empirical data and by acoustical theory. Catford's 1981 paper contains detailed discussion of Wood's arguments, and a partial defence of the classical vowel description that Wood's research calls into question. In his critical analysis of phonetic theory, John Laver notes "Because it is so widespread, a version of the traditional method will be described here; but Ladefoged (1980) and Wood (1977, 1979) have proposed descriptions of tongue action which though less well known are more explanatory and less ambiguous, which are recommended to the reader who wishes to follow the matter further". Clark and Yallop write "There is no principled reason why the location of maximum tongue height should correspond directly and systematically to vowel quality (Lindau 1978, Wood 1979). Hayward summarizes Wood's theoretical position, concluding "In Wood's view, constriction location and constriction degree should also form the basis for the phonological specification of vowels. His ideas have proved attractive to some phonologists."

== See also ==
- List of phonetics topics
- Human voice
