= Patrick Bouvier Kennedy =

Son of U.S. president John F. Kennedy (1963)

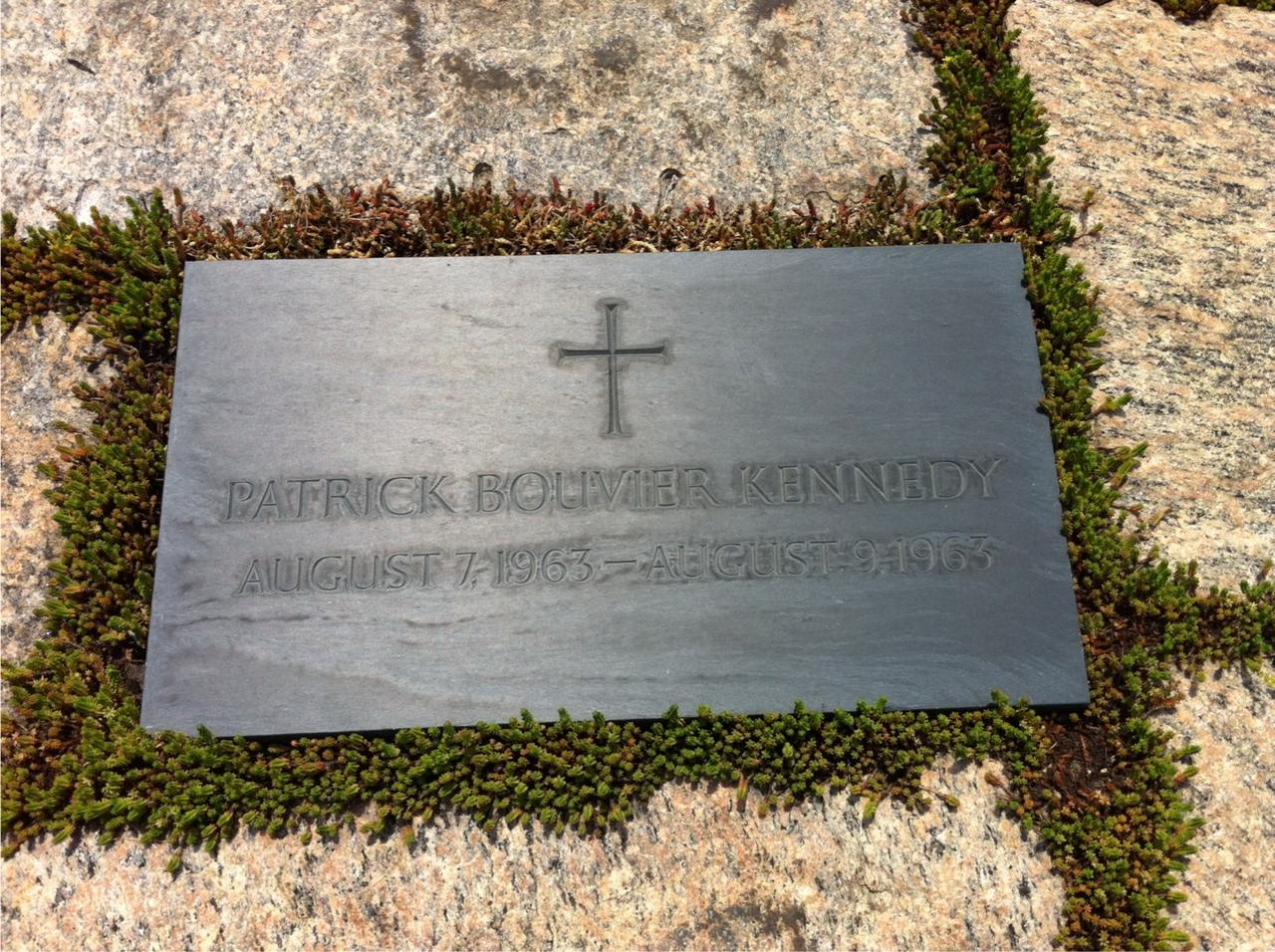
- Gravestone at the Kennedy family plot in Arlington National Cemetery
- Born: Patrick Bouvier Kennedy; August 7, 1963; Otis Air Force Base Hospital, Bourne, Massachusetts, U.S.
- Died: August 9, 1963 (aged 2 days); Boston Children's Hospital, Boston, Massachusetts, U.S.
- Cause of death: Infant respiratory distress syndrome
- Resting place: Arlington National Cemetery
- Citizenship: American
- Parents: John F. Kennedy; Jacqueline Kennedy
- Relatives: Kennedy family Bouvier family

Patrick Bouvier Kennedy (August 7, 1963 – August 9, 1963) was the youngest child of United States president John F. Kennedy and First Lady Jacqueline Kennedy. His elder siblings were Caroline, John Jr., and Arabella.

Born prematurely, Kennedy lived for just 39 hours before dying from complications of hyaline membrane disease (HMD), after desperate attempts to save him failed. His infant death left the first family and nation in mourning. However, it also brought HMD (later known as neonatal respiratory distress syndrome) into the public consciousness, inspiring further research.

== Background ==
In August 1963, the 34-year-old Jacqueline Kennedy was in her third year as first lady and in the third trimester of her fifth pregnancy. Kennedy had suffered a miscarriage in 1955, followed the next year by a stillborn girl whom the Kennedys planned to name Arabella after a ship with that name. Two healthy children followed: Caroline in 1957 and John Jr. in 1960. As John had also been premature, Kennedy asked her obstetrician, John W. Walsh, to accompany her when she and her children spent the summer in Hyannis Port, Massachusetts. The nearby Otis Air Force Base Hospital had also prepared a suite for her in case it was necessary.

On the morning of Wednesday, August 7, Jackie took Caroline and John Jr. for a pony ride in Osterville, Massachusetts. While the children were riding, Kennedy felt labor pains. Walsh was summoned, and they were taken by helicopter to Otis Air Force Base.

President Kennedy was at the White House at the time. August 7 was the 20th anniversary of the day the United States Navy had rescued him in World War II after he had spent five days marooned on an island in the Pacific. Kennedy had been in command of Motor Torpedo Boat PT-109 when it was rammed by a Japanese destroyer, killing two of his crew. His heroics had helped launch his political career. PT-109 and August 7 were never far from his mind, and he kept a scale model of the boat on a shelf in the Oval Office and each day used a metal tie clasp shaped like a torpedo boat, with PT 109 stamped across its bow.

All of which may explain why Kennedy's friend and fellow World War II naval veteran Ben Bradlee is certain that when the president's secretary, Evelyn Lincoln, hurried into the Oval Office at 11:43 a.m. on August 7, a Wednesday, to report that Jackie had gone into premature labor on Cape Cod, there was "no way in God's earth" that he did not think, My child is being born 20 years to the day when I was rescued, a coincidence providing an additional emotional dimension to a day that would be among the most traumatic of his life.

— Thurston Clarke, JFK's Last Hundred Days (2013)

== Birth and treatment ==
While his father was aboard Air Force One, the infant Kennedy was born by emergency caesarean section at 12:52 p.m. on August 7, 1963, at the Otis Air Force Base Hospital in Bourne, Massachusetts, five and a half weeks prematurely. The caesarean section was performed by Dr. John W. Walsh, who had also delivered John Jr. in 1960. The infant's birth weight was 4 pounds 10 1/2 ounces (2.11 kg). He was the first child born to a serving U.S. President and First Lady since the 19th century (third overall after Esther (1893–1980) and Marion Cleveland (1895–1977) during the second presidency of Grover Cleveland).

Shortly after birth, Kennedy developed symptoms of hyaline membrane disease (HMD), later called infant respiratory distress syndrome (IRDS). It was detected by breathing difficulties within minutes. The president arrived, saw his son in distress, and sent for a chaplain. The infant was quickly baptized, named Patrick after his great-grandfather Patrick Joseph Kennedy (1858–1929), and was given the middle name of Bouvier after his mother's maiden name.

The president was allowed to wheel the baby in an incubator to the First Lady's bedside. James E. Drorbaught, the pediatric specialist at Boston Children's Hospital, was flown by helicopter from Boston to consult on his case, and he recommended transfer to Boston. Five hours after birth, the infant, accompanied by Dr. Drorbaught, was rushed by ambulance to Boston Children's Hospital, 70 miles (110 km) away, in under 90 minutes. The transfer to the hospital in Boston was initially reported as a "precautionary measure," the White House said. The baby's condition was accurately reported as HMD, but it was also reported that it would take at least four days to assess his condition and that he was being given medication to assist his condition.

At the time, all that could be done for a baby with hyaline membrane disease was to keep the patient's blood chemistry as close to normal as possible. Led by Dr. Drorbaught, who stayed awake the entire time, the hospital tried everything possible to save the infant's life. The baby was given hyperbaric oxygen therapy (HBOT) in which he was placed in a hyperbaric chamber filled with 100% oxygen and pressurized to greater than one atmosphere. At the time, the treatment was revolutionary; The New York Times described it as "one of the newest interests of medical researchers."

== Death and funeral ==
Patrick Kennedy died at 4:04 a.m. on August 9 "despite a desperate medical effort to save him" and had lived for 39 hours and 12 minutes. At the time of the infant's death, the president was outside the room with the hyperbaric chamber with his brother, U.S. Attorney General Robert F. Kennedy. The first lady, then 34, remained at Otis Air Force Base Hospital recovering from the caesarean section. She was told of her son's death by Dr. Walsh. (He would console her again after her husband's assassination and was aboard Air Force One with her as she returned from Dallas with the president's body a few months later.) She was given a sedative and slept until the president flew from Boston. Very little was said about the family's reaction. White House Press Secretary Pierre Salinger stated of the first lady's condition: "Given the circumstances, her condition is satisfactory." The president, who had reportedly slept only four hours since the birth, was photographed arriving at Otis Air Force Base looking "grave and appearing tired."

A small funeral mass was held on August 10, 1963, in the private chapel of Cardinal Richard Cushing in Boston. The president's mother, Rose Kennedy, was in Paris and was told not to return for the funeral, but the first lady's sister Lee Radziwill had already flown in from Greece before the baby died.

Cushing, the Archbishop of Boston, performed the funeral mass, as he would for John F. Kennedy, assassinated 104 days later. Siblings Caroline, then five years old, and John Jr., two years old, did not attend.

The child was initially buried at Holyhood Cemetery in Brookline, Massachusetts, the president's hometown. His body and that of his stillborn sister Arabella were reinterred on December 5, 1963, alongside their father, at Arlington National Cemetery and later moved to their permanent graves in Section 45, Grid U-35.

== Legacy ==
Kennedy's death made 1963 a "pivotal year" for neonatology, then still a relatively new field, according to an examination of its history in the journal Neonatology. The increased public awareness of HMD led to a corresponding increase in research of the disease, spurring development of new medical ventilators, blood gas tests and newborn intensive-care practices in both the United States and Europe. The first trials of a potential treatment for HMD, dipalmitoylphosphatidylcholine, were published within a few years but were not considered a clinical success. According to Dr. Suhas M. Nafday, director of Newborn Services at the Children's Hospital at Montefiore Medical Center in New York, the child's death "energized the neonatal researchers into action to look for an effective management of respiratory distress syndrome." In a review of advances in clinical medicine, researcher Thor Hansen observed that the "medical profession did not have the tools to help" Kennedy, "the newborn son of arguably the most powerful man in the world," but 50 years later, treatment of his condition would be considered routine, with survival expected. Tetsurō Fujiwara, the Japanese pediatrician who developed the first artificial pulmonary surfactant for neonates in 1979, recalled that Patrick's death motivated his research for surfactant.

The parents were deeply affected by the death of their son. Secret Service agent Clint Hill recalled the couple having "a distinctly closer relationship" that was visible after the child's death. White House Press Secretary Pierre Salinger believed that the couple had been brought closer by the presidency but even more so by the child's death.

== See also ==
- Preterm birth
