= Sidney S. Woods =

American fighter ace

Sidney Sterling Woods
- Born: July 25, 1917; San Marcos, Texas
- Died: March 31, 1989 (aged 71)
- Military career
- Allegiance: United States of America
- Branch: United States Army Air Forces; United States Air Force
- Service years: 1939–1945; 1951–1952
- Rank: Colonel
- Nickname: Sid
- Conflicts: World War II
- Awards: Distinguished Service Cross; Silver Star; Distinguished Flying Cross (3); Air Medal (10); Croix de guerre (France)
- Other work: American Fighter Aces Association

Sidney Sterling Woods (25 July 1917 – 31 March 1989) was an American fighter ace of World War II with 7 victories in Europe and the Pacific theater.

== Early years ==
Sidney Woods was born in San Marcos, Texas on July 25, 1917. He spent much of his youth in Arizona. He played quarterback for the University of Arizona from 1935 to 1939, and graduated in 1939.

== Military service ==
=== U.S. Army Cavalry ===
Second Lieutenant Woods served the next two years (1939–1940) as a cavalryman at Fort Bliss. He was accepted for flight training and graduated from pilot school in September 1941. As a member of the U.S. Army Air Forces, he was flying with the 49th Pursuit Group at the time of the Japanese attack on Pearl Harbor.

=== World War II flying ace ===
In 1942 and 1943, while based in Australia and the Southwest Pacific he flew Lockheed P-38 Lightnings and shot down two enemy aircraft in 112 combat missions. He returned to the U.S. in 1943.

Woods spent six months commanding a P-38 training squadron before he was sent to Europe as a P-38 pilot with a new unit. He completed his first tour in Europe in late 1944. Subsequently, he returned to the European Theater of Operations (ETO) for another combat tour, flying P-51 Mustangs with the 4th Fighter Group. As deputy group commander, Lt. Col. Woods became an ace in a day by downing five Focke-Wulf Fw 190s on 22 March 1945. However, three weeks later he was shot down by flak over Prague, Czechoslovakia, on his 68th ETO mission when he was leading Group "A" in a strafing attack against the Luftwaffe bases in the area. He spent the remainder of the war as a prisoner of war. He was released from captivity about two months later. He was discharged in 1945, returning to Arizona.

=== Korean War ===
During the Korean War he was called to active duty (1951–1952) to command a training unit at Williams Air Force Base. He also led the Air Force Jet Acrobatic Team, the predecessor to the Air Force's Thunderbirds.

=== Decorations ===
Colonel Woods' decorations included the Army Distinguished Service Cross, Silver Star, three Distinguished Flying Crosses, ten Air Medals, and the French Croix de guerre.

- Distinguished Service Cross
- Silver Star
- Distinguished Flying Cross with two oak leaf clusters
- Air Medal with one silver oak leaf cluster and four bronze oak leaf clusters
- French Croix de Guerre

== Civilian career ==
Woods settled in Arizona after World War II, becoming a successful Yuma businessman, flying his own aircraft, and as a founding member of the American Fighter Aces Association.

He was a delegate to the Republican National Convention in 1964.

Sid Woods died of cancer at age 71 and his alma mater established an alumni service award in his honor.
