= John Latta (RAF officer) =

Canadian flying ace of WWII

John Blandford Latta
- Born: 6 August 1914; Vancouver, British Columbia, Canada
- Died: 12 January 1941 (aged 26); English Channel
- Military career
- Allegiance: Canada
- Branch: Royal Air Force
- Rank: Flying Officer
- Unit: No. 242 Squadron
- Conflicts: Second World War: Battle of France; Battle of Britain; Channel Front
- Awards: Distinguished Flying Cross

John Blandford Latta, DFC (6 August 1914 – 12 January 1941) was a Canadian-born officer who served in the Royal Air Force (RAF) during the Second World War. He was credited with at least seven aerial victories.

Born in Vancouver, Latta joined the RAF in early 1939. After his training was completed, he was posted to No. 242 Squadron. Flying the Hawker Hurricane fighter, he flew extensively during the Battle of France, and helped cover the evacuation of the British Expeditionary Force from Dunkirk. He subsequently flew in the Battle of Britain, claiming more aerial victories in addition to those achieved in France, and being awarded the Distinguished Flying Cross. He was killed in January 1941 while flying a sortie to France.

== Early life ==
John Blandford Latta was born in Vancouver, British Columbia, Canada on 6 August 1914. The son of a veteran of the First World War, Lieutenant Colonel William S. Latta who had served in the Canadian Expeditionary Force, he went to Oak Bay High School before going on to Victoria College. He subsequently worked as a salmon fisherman, operating his own trawler along the coast of the Northwest Pacific. He also served in the militia from 1930 to 1933, in the 16th Canadian Scottish Territorial Regiment which was his father's former unit.

In response to a recruitment advertisement, Latta applied for a short service commission in the Royal Air Force (RAF). Gaining acceptance as a probationary pilot officer, he travelled to the United Kingdom in early 1939 and commenced flight training at No. 4 Elementary and Reserve Flying Training School in March. He gained his wings the following month and went on to No. 12 Flying Training School.

== Second World War ==
In November, and with the Second World War now underway, Latta was posted to No. 242 Squadron as a pilot officer although under probation. His new unit was based at Church Fenton and was composed of Canadian flight crew. Intended to be a fighter squadron, from February 1940 it was equipped with the Hawker Hurricane fighter having initially operated Bristol Blenheim and Fairey Battle light bombers. Its working up period was completed on 23 March at which time it became operational. By this time, Latta was no longer under probation and had been confirmed in his rank of pilot officer.

=== Battle of France ===
In May 1940, following the German invasion of France, No. 242 Squadron began operating from Biggin Hill, flying to France and patrolling over the battlefields there. After a week, it moved to the continent for closer support and became heavily engaged as it covered the retreat of the British Expeditionary Force (BEF) in the face of the German advance. Latta achieved his first aerial victory as the squadron helped cover the evacuation of the BEF elements trapped at Dunkirk; on 29 May, he shot down a Messerschmitt Bf 109 fighter about 15 miles (24 km) east of the evacuation beaches. Two days later he destroyed another Bf 109, this time over Dunkirk itself. The squadron stayed on France once the BEF had left Dunkirk, supporting the remaining British units as they retreated to Brittany. Its final base was at Nantes before the survivors flew back to England, landing at Coltishall on 18 June to rest and reequip.

=== Battle of Britain ===
Now under the command of Squadron Leader Douglas Bader, No. 242 Squadron became operational on 9 July. The following day Latta destroyed a Heinkel He 111 medium bomber east of Lowestoft. In August, the Luftwaffe increased its tempo of operations and the squadron became increasingly engaged in the fighting to the north and east of London as part of No. 12 Group's Duxford Wing. On 21 August, Latta was one of three pilots that contributed to the destruction of a Dornier Do 17 medium bomber 8 miles (13 km) west of Harleston. Writing to his family describing the event, he believed he "hit his [the bomber's] loaded bomb rack". He shot down a Bf 109 over the Thames on 9 September and then, on what is now known as Battle of Britain Day, destroyed another Bf 109 over Maidstone. On 27 September, he destroyed two Bf 109s, one going down in the sea off Dover and the other someway inland.

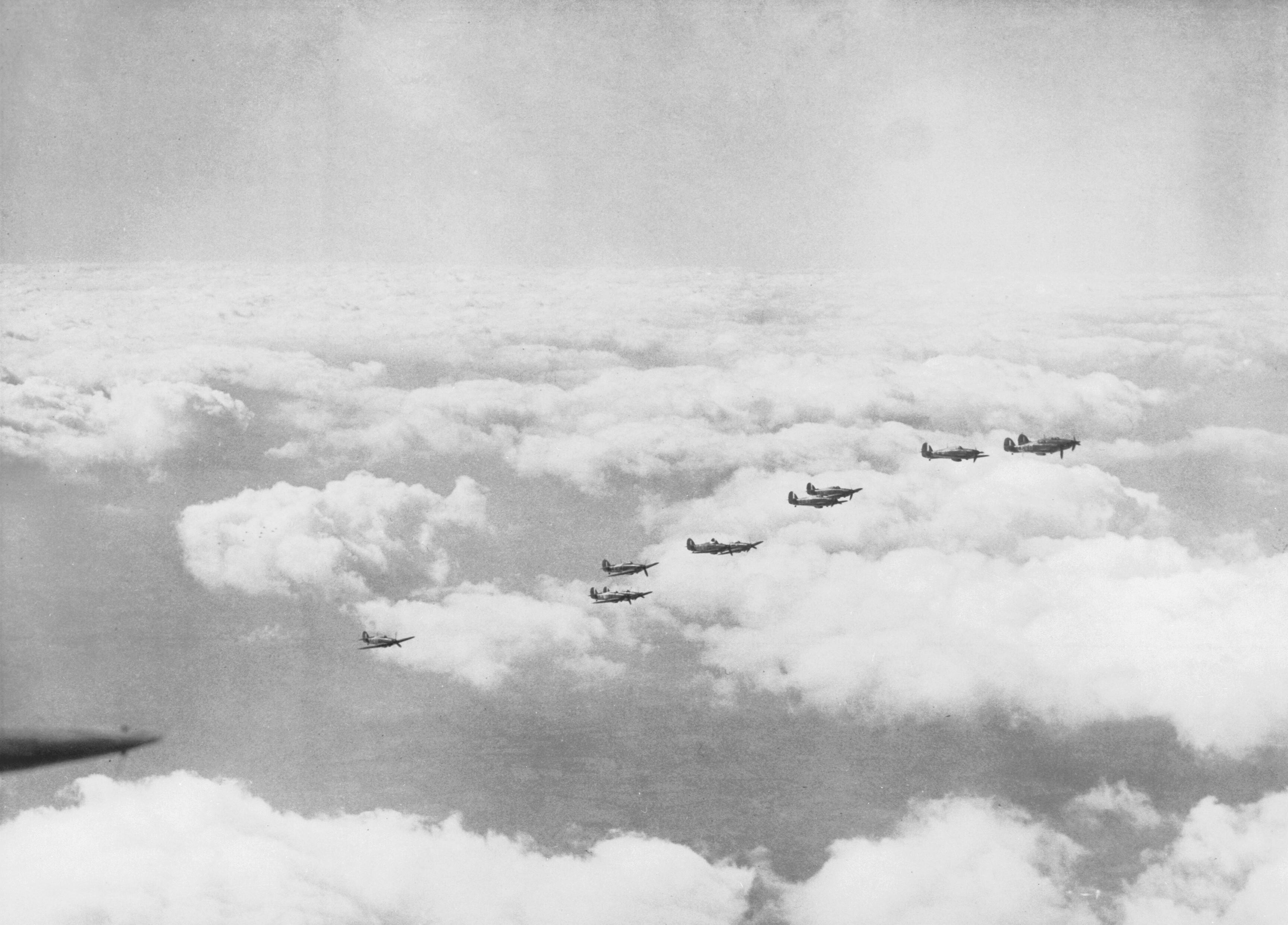
Hawker Hurricanes of No. 242 Squadron, flying over England in October 1940

Aerial operations tailed off into October and No. 242 Squadron switched to night fighter duties for a time, but were unsuccessful in this role. In early November, Latta was promoted to flying officer. Shortly afterwards, he was awarded the Distinguished Flying Cross; the citation, published in The London Gazette, read:

Pilot Officer Latta has destroyed eight enemy aircraft in operations over France and this country. On one occasion, his squadron attacked a number of Messerschmitt 109's. This officer destroyed one and, although his own aircraft had been hit in the wings and tail by cannon shells, attacked and destroyed a second enemy aircraft. He has displayed the utmost coolness in the midst of fierce combat.

— London Gazette, No. 34987, 8 November 1940

In early 1941, Fighter Command switched to offensive tactics, flying operations to France. Latta flew on the first major operation, in which No. 242 Squadron was one of three squadrons that escorted Blenheim bombers attacking an airfield near Calais on 10 January. Two days later, the squadron mounted a number of hit-and-run raids, seeking out targets of opportunity along the French coast. Latta was killed when he and his wingman were intercepted by Bf 109s and he was shot down over the English Channel.

He has no known grave and is commemorated on the Runneymeade Memorial at Englefield Green. He is credited with seven aircraft destroyed and shared in the destruction of another aircraft.
