= Texas Tower =

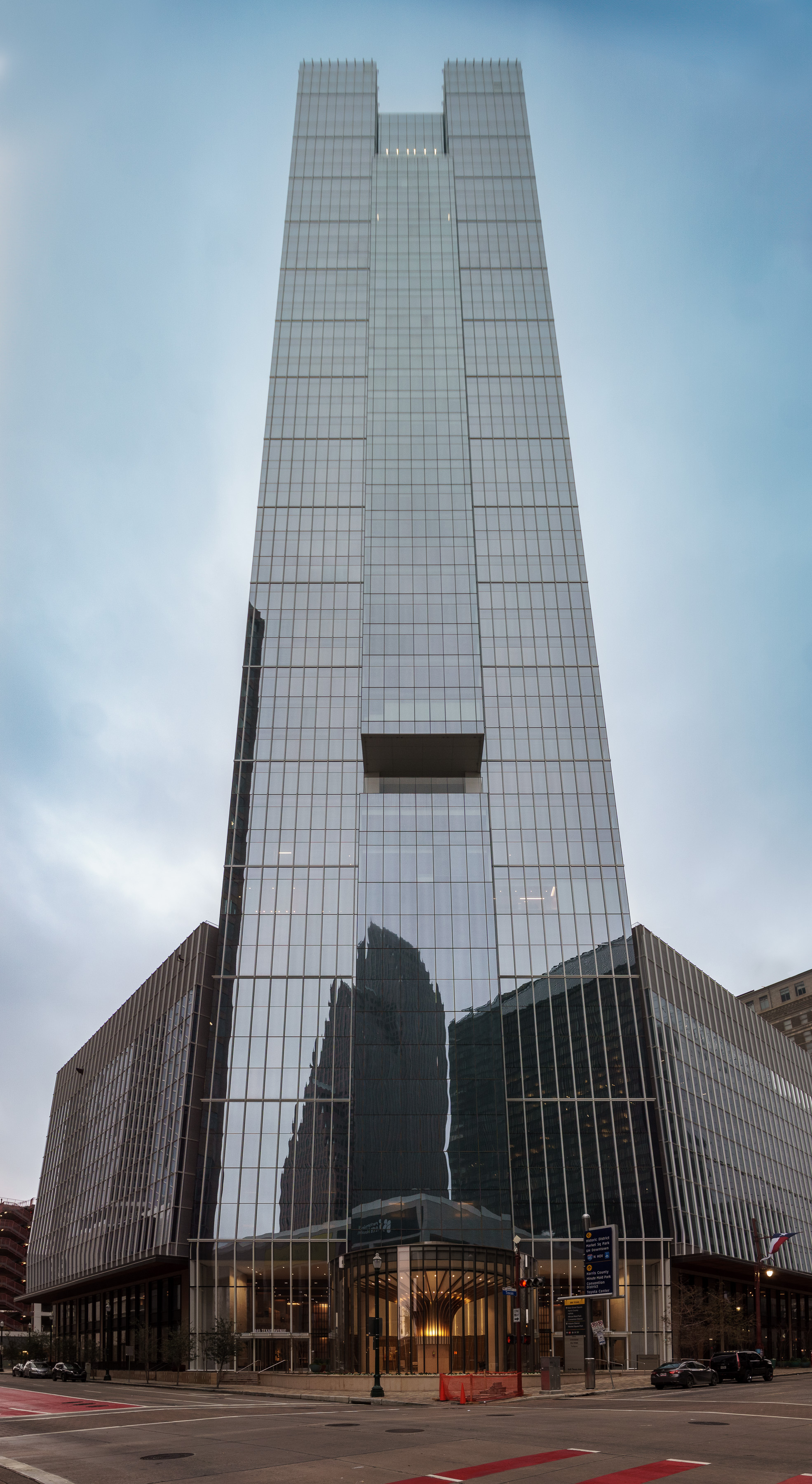
- Interactive map of Texas Tower
- Former names: Block 58

General information
- Status: Completed
- Type: Commercial offices
- Architectural style: Modernist
- Location: Downtown Houston, Houston, Texas, United States, 845 Texas Avenue
- Coordinates: 29.7608°N 95.3657°W
- Construction started: 2018
- Completed: 2021
- Cost: US $302 million
- Owner: Hines and Ivanhoé Cambridge
- Operator: Hines

Height
- Architectural: 735 ft (224 m)
- Top floor: 661 ft (201.6 m)

Technical details
- Floor count: 47
- Floor area: 1,140,975 sq ft (106,000.0 m^{2})
- Lifts/elevators: 28

Design and construction
- Architects: Pelli Clarke & Partners; Kendall/Heaton Associates
- Developer: Hines; Ivanhoé Cambridge
- Structural engineer: Magnusson Klemencic Associates
- Main contractor: Gilbane Building Company

Website
- texastower.com

Texas Tower is a 735-foot (224 m) office skyscraper at 845 Texas Avenue in Downtown Houston, Texas, United States. Developed by Houston-based real estate firm Hines in partnership with Ivanhoé Cambridge, the building opened in December 2021. It was designed by Pelli Clarke & Partners, with Kendall/Heaton Associates serving as architect of record.

== History ==
The site was formerly occupied by Houston Chronicle's downtown headquarters. Demolition of the Chronicle building began in 2017 as the property was prepared for redevelopment. Hines and Canadian real estate investor Ivanhoé Cambridge subsequently developed the site as a new office skyscraper.

The project was initially referred to as Block 58. Construction was underway by early 2019, when Hines and Ivanhoé Cambridge announced that the development would be named Texas Tower. The project was planned as a 57-story office tower containing approximately one million square feet of space.

The building structurally topped out in March 2021. Hines said the milestone was reached several weeks ahead of schedule despite construction occurring during the COVID-19 pandemic.

Texas Tower officially opened in December 2021. At the time of its opening, the Houston Chronicle reported approximately 1.2 million square feet of space and noted that the project was completed during a period of elevated downtown Houston office vacancies and widespread adoption of remote and hybrid work.

Hines subsequently relocated its global headquarters to Texas Tower in 2022.
