= Otis Air National Guard Base =

Massachusetts Air National Guard installation

- Part of Joint Base Cape Cod
- Near Mashpee, Massachusetts in the United States
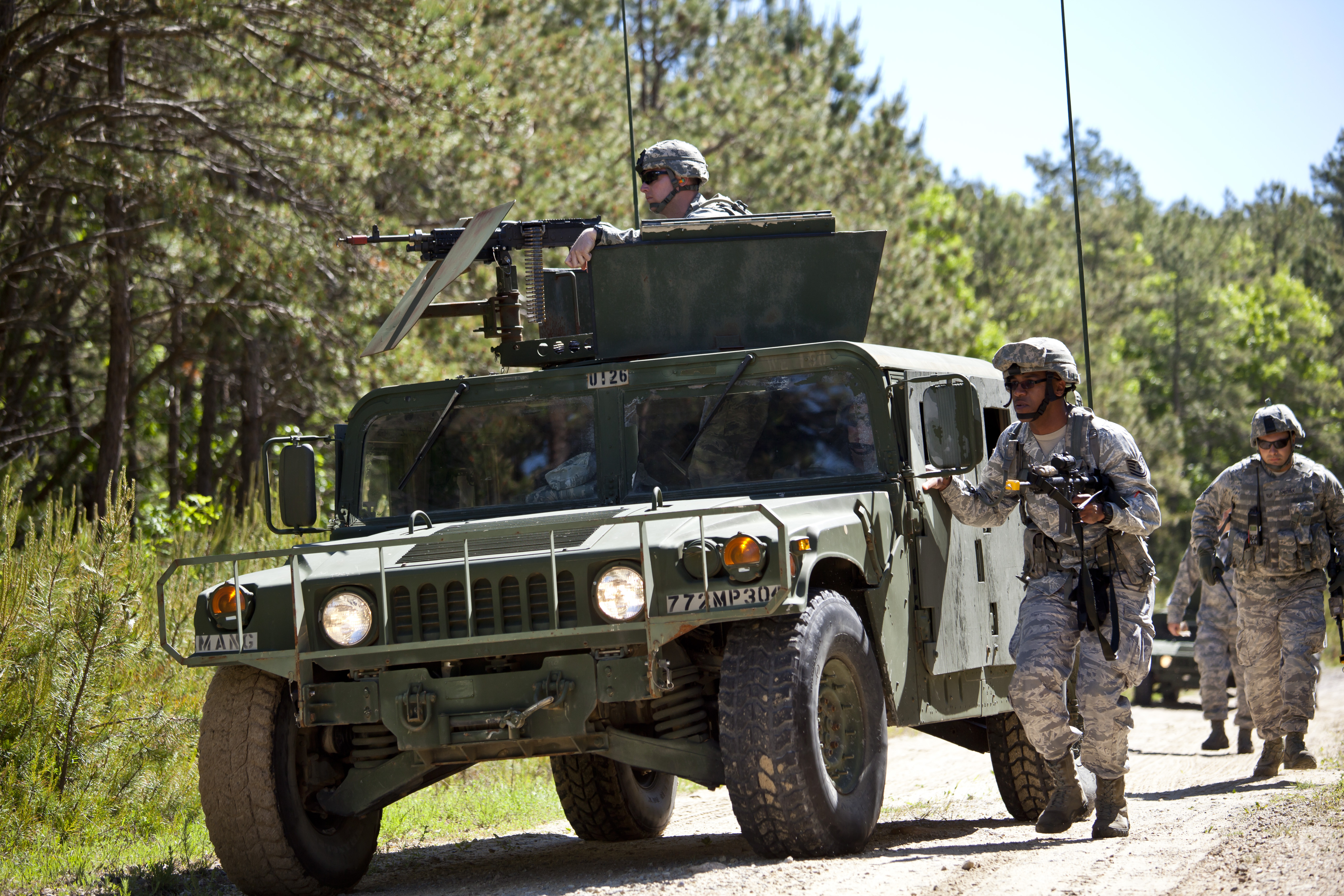
- Personnel from the 102nd Security Forces Squadron, part of the Massachusetts Air National Guard's 102nd Intelligence Wing based at Otis ANGB.

Site information
- Type: Air National Guard Base
- Owner: Department of Defense
- Operator: United States Air Force
- Controlled by: Massachusetts Air National Guard
- Condition: Operational
- Website: www.102iw.ang.af.mil/

Location
- Location within Massachusetts Location within the United States Location within North America Location within North Atlantic Location within Earth
- Coordinates: 41°39′31″N 070°31′17″W

Site history
- Built: 1938
- In use: since 1938

Garrison information
- Garrison: 102nd Intelligence Wing

Airfield information
- Identifiers: IATA: FMH, ICAO: KFMH, FAA LID: FMH, WMO: 725060
- Elevation: 39.6 metres (130 ft) AMSL
Runways
Direction	Length and surface
14/32	2,895.9 metres (9,501 ft) Asphalt/Concrete
05/23	2,438.4 metres (8,000 ft) Asphalt/Concrete
- Airfield element of base transferred to the control of the US Coast Guard in 2006 and known as Cape Cod Coast Guard Air Station. Source: Federal Aviation Administration

Otis Air National Guard Base (IATA: FMH, ICAO: KFMH, FAA LID: FMH) is an Air National Guard installation located within Joint Base Cape Cod, a military training facility located on the western portion of Cape Cod in Barnstable County, Massachusetts, United States. It was known as Otis Air Force Base prior to its transfer from the active duty Air Force to the Air National Guard. In the local community, it is more commonly known as Otis Air Base or simply Otis. It was named in honor of pilot and Boston surgeon Lt. Frank "Jesse" Otis.

Major units include the Coast Guard Air Station Cape Cod, Coast Guard Base Cape Cod and the 102nd Intelligence Wing. Other units include the wing's 101st Air Operations Squadron, the 253d Cyberspace Engineering Installation Group, the 212th Engineering Installation Squadron, the 267th Combat Communications Squadron, the 202nd Weather Flight, the 3rd Battalion, 126th Aviation Regiment, part of the 29th Infantry Division (Army National Guard), and the Coastal Patrol Squadron 18, Cape Cod Composite Squadron 044-Massachusetts Wing (Civil Air Patrol).

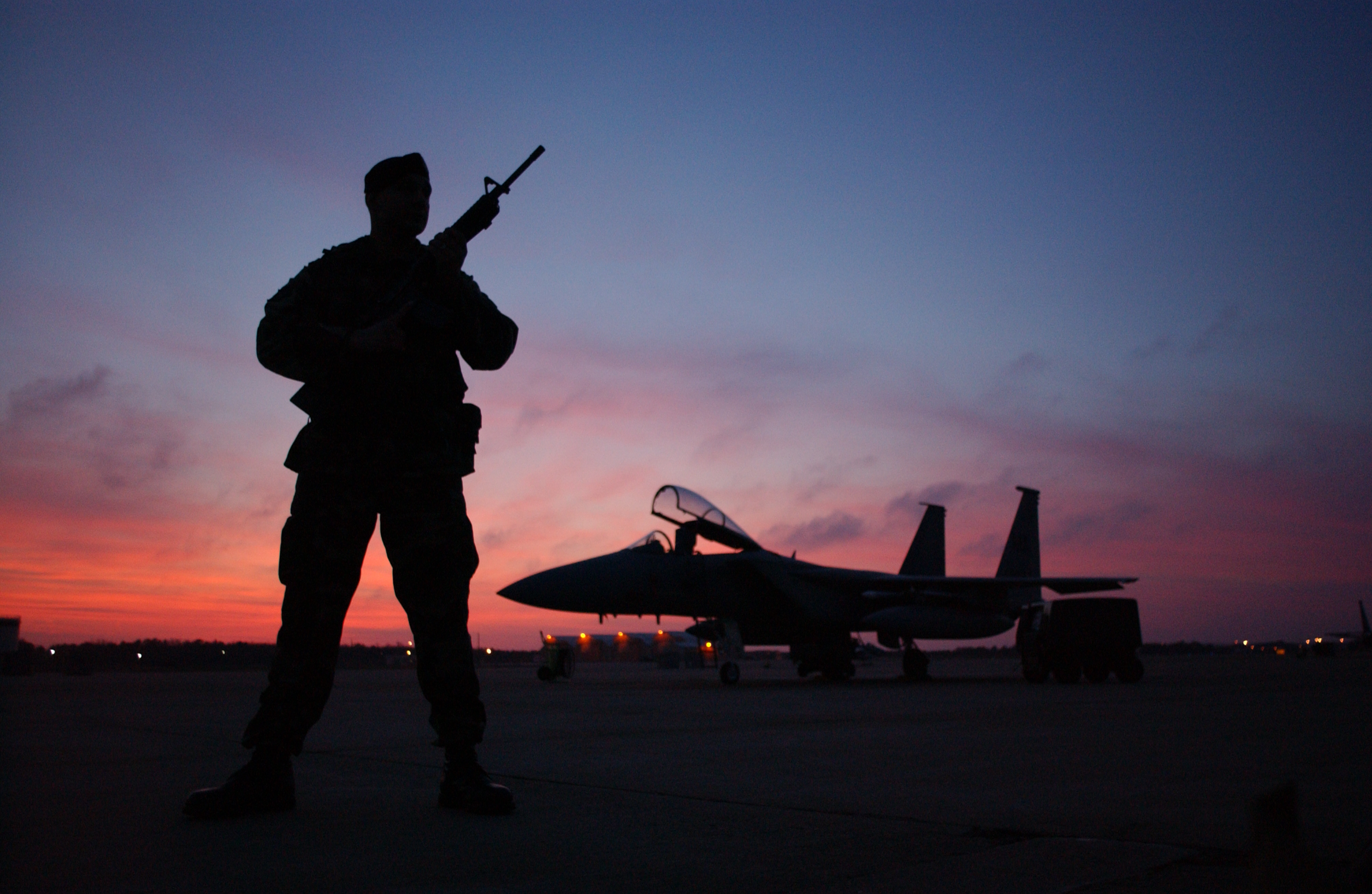
SSgt Nasam Rissvi guards an F-15 at Otis ANGB during a December sunset

== Establishment ==
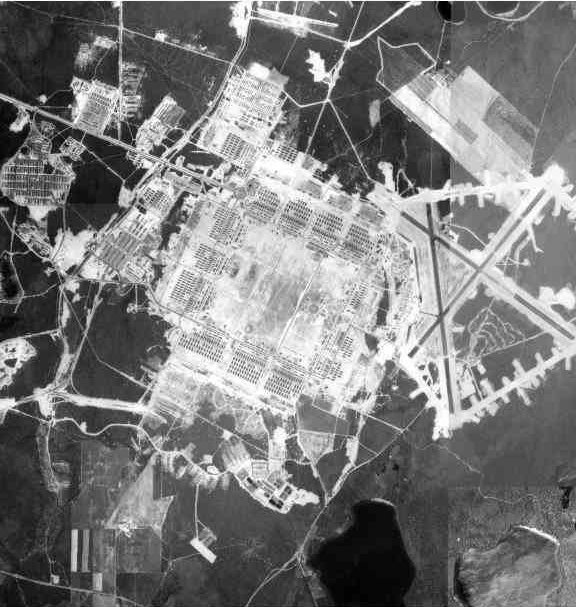
Photo of Naval Auxiliary Air Facility Otis, circa 1943

Otis Air National Guard Base is named for pilot, flight surgeon, and eminent Boston City Hospital surgeon Lt. Frank "Jesse" Otis. He was a member of the 101st Observation Squadron who was killed on 11 January 1937 when his Douglas O-46A crashed at Hennepin, Illinois while on a cross-country training mission. In 1938, the landing field area at Camp Edwards was named Otis Field in his memory. Ten years later, the base was renamed Otis Air Force Base in his honor. During the Korean War, it was used by the Army to provide basic training. Until 1973, it was the largest Aerospace Defense Command base in the world. During World War II, the field was known as Naval Auxiliary Air Facility Otis and was a subordinate field for Naval Air Station Quonset Point, Rhode Island.

== Cold War ==
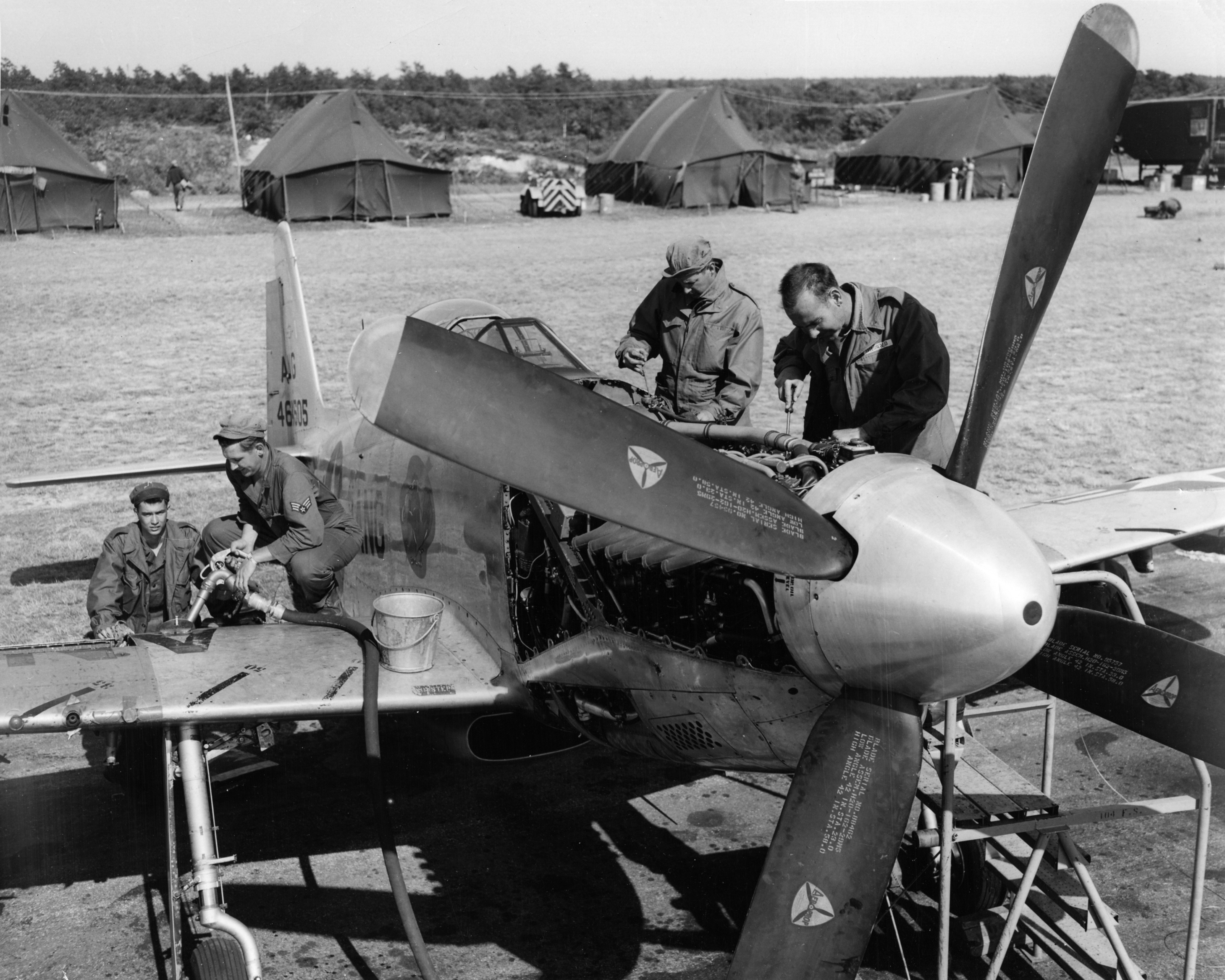
F-51H Mustang from the 104th Fighter-Bomber Squadron of the Maryland Air National Guard at Otis in 1954

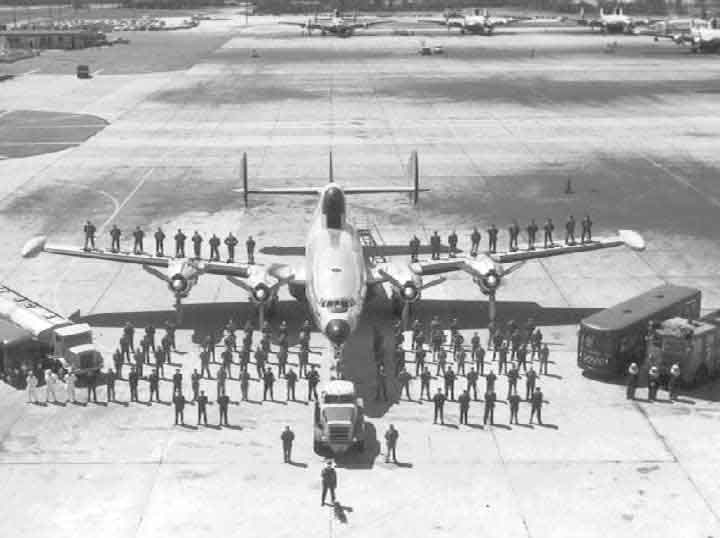
EC-121 Warning Star support crew on the tarmac

During the Cold War, the base was a key Aerospace Defense Command (ADC) installation. Activities included the 33rd Fighter Wing, the 4604th Support Squadron supporting the Texas Towers (1956–63), the 60th Fighter-Interceptor Squadron, and the 551st Airborne Early Warning and Control Wing aircraft, flying over the Atlantic Ocean from 1954. The 551st flew the EC-121 Warning Star before moving to Hanscom Air Force Base in 1969. The 551st was also the first Air Force wing to fly the EC-121. The 33rd flew various fighter jets in conjunction with the 60th Fighter Interceptor Squadron. The expanding mission led to the runways being lengthened in 1960. The base was also home to the 26th Air Defense Missile Squadron, which operated BOMARC surface-to-air missiles. The regular air force began leaving Otis in the late 1960s as improvements in radar made the 551st more costly when compared to newer technologies. The 551st and the 60th left Otis when the Air Force began to move the continental air defense mission over to the Air National Guard.

Strategic Air Command maintained the 19th Air Refueling Squadron at Otis AFB flying the KC-97 Stratofreighter. After the squadron inactivated, SAC assigned Detachment 1, 416th Bombardment Wing/ 41st Air Refueling Squadron, based at Griffiss AFB, New York with 2 KC-135 Stratotanker and 2 99th Bombardment Wing / 99th Air Refueling Squadron, Westover AFB, Massachusetts KC-135 Stratotankers on 24 Hour Alert Duty.

After active duty units left, the Massachusetts Air National Guard's 102d Fighter Wing (102 FW) became the main unit at the base, flying fighter and air defense missions. During the Cold War period from 1964 until 2004, the 102 FW operated a variety of air defense and tactical fighter aircraft, including the F-86H Sabre, F-84B/F Thunderstreak, F-100D Super Sabre, F-106A/B Delta Dart and F-15A/B Eagle. The Wing's 101st Tactical Fighter Squadron shared missions with the 33rd Tactical Fighter Wing during the Cold War. In 1987, the 102 FW transitioned to the F-15A Eagle, and, later, to the F-15C Eagle.

The base was also utilized as a stopover for a French Air Force Mirage IV on the way to French Polynesia for Operation Tamoure.

Following the 2005 Base Realignment and Closure Commission, the 102 FW was directed to transfer its F-15 aircraft to its sister unit, the 104th Fighter Wing at Barnes Municipal Airport/ANGB. All F-15 aircraft were transferred by January 2008 and the 102 FW was redesignated as the 102d Intelligence Wing (102 IW), a non-flying unit.

President John F. Kennedy used Otis on many occasions for the landing of Air Force One when he traveled to the Kennedy Compound in Hyannis. He would then board an Army or Marine Corps helicopter which would then take him to the compound. It was at the Otis AFB Hospital that his wife, Jacqueline, gave birth to their son Patrick Bouvier Kennedy, who died two days later. A recording of a telephone call between Kennedy and General McHugh later was published, with Kennedy calling to complain about the cost of furniture sent for the hospital room and demanding it be returned.

=== Closure ===
In the early 1970s, Otis AFB was marked for closure as part of a nationwide reduction of military bases, to cut costs as the Vietnam War wound down. In 1973, Governor of Massachusetts Francis W. Sargent appointed the Otis Task Force to oversee a phase-down of military activities at the Massachusetts Military Reservation (MMR). The major concern of Cape residents was the fate of base property and impacts on the local economy as military activities decreased. While the future of the base was in limbo, ideas were floated that would include the redeveloping of the base into a recreation center of sorts that would rival Disneyland. The state even went so far as to mail out brochures to 1,500 corporations around the world, advertising the redevelopment opportunities of the base.

=== PAVE PAWS ===
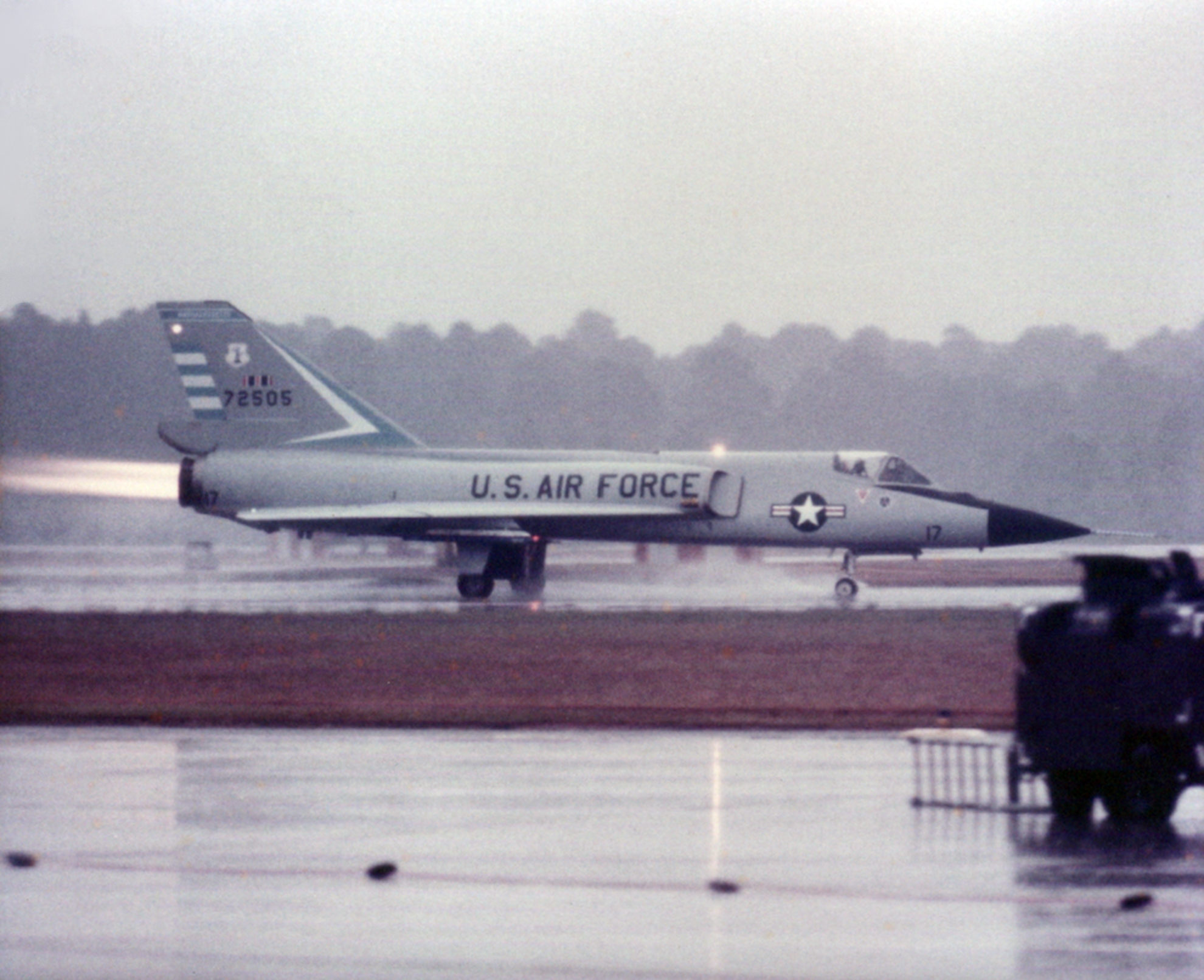
F-106 Delta Dart taking off on a rainy day

In 1977, Otis AFB was officially redistributed with the establishment of boundary lines which divided the complex into several installations, all within the confines of the original Otis AFB. Established was Otis Air National Guard Base, Camp Edwards (an Army National Guard small arms training facility that served as a POW camp during World War II), and Coast Guard Air Station Cape Cod (which utilizes the Otis ANGB runways). Together they form the Massachusetts Military Reservation, where 17 other state, federal and private entities operate within its boundaries.

In 1978, the Regular Air Force returned to Otis ANGB with the construction of the Precision Acquisition Vehicle Entry Phased Array Warning System (PAVE PAWS) near the Cape Cod Canal. PAVE PAWS is designed to detect airborne ballistic missiles and monitor orbiting satellites.

PAVE PAWS is an Active Space Force site and consists of the 6th Space Warning Squadron. This unit is known as Cape Cod Air Station and not directly affiliated to Otis ANG, Base.

== Twenty-first century ==
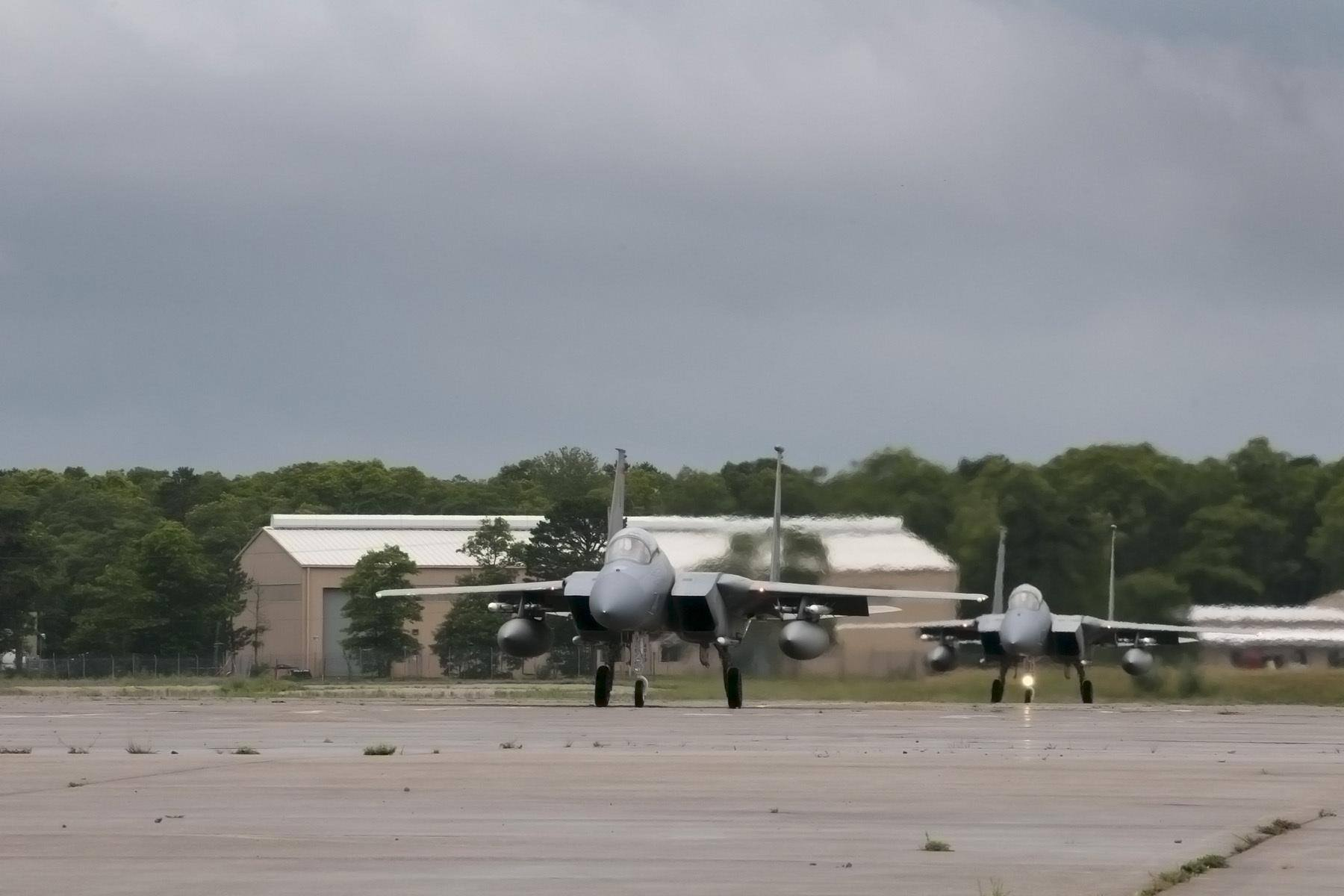
F-15s formerly from the 102nd return to Otis on 11 July 2013. The 104th Fighter Wing will maintain its alert posture within the existing alert-infrastructure on Cape Cod while the training missions will fly out of Westover Air Reserve Base.

Otis ANGB was originally scheduled to be closed by the 2005 Base Realignment and Closure (BRAC), but it was spared in last minute decisions. However, the 102nd Fighter Wing did lose its F-15 Eagle and transitioned to a non-flying mission, redesignated as the 102d Intelligence Wing. The only military aircraft currently based at Otis ANGB are those of the Coast Guard and Army, although transient military aircraft continue to use the facility, and the Navy has considered it as a place of interest should they decide to base naval forces in the Northeast again.

A partnership was created on December 22, 2006 among the Coast Guard, National Guard, and the Commonwealth of Massachusetts. The Coast Guard assumed control of the aviation facilities from the Air Force, the Air National Guard took over the management of the utilities, and the state funds the emergency services and fire protection. Improvements to the lighting system were put in control of the Coast Guard. The Federal Aviation Administration has released new flight procedures that identify the ICAO code KFMH with the name of Coast Guard Air Station Cape Cod.

On November 6, 2009, ground was broken on new facilities for the 102nd Intelligence Wing. The airport was a NASA Space Shuttle launch abort site. In May 2013, it was announced that one third of the 104th Fighter Wing's F-15 aircraft would be moving to Otis to take up an alert mission for four to six months, as Barnes Municipal Airport's runway underwent renovation.

In December 2013, Otis was selected as a test site by the United States Federal Aviation Administration to "aid in researching the complexities of integrating Unmanned Aircraft Systems into the congested, northeast airspace." Massachusetts Institute of Technology will work with Otis to test drones at the airport.

=== September 11, 2001 ===
On September 11, 2001, the North American Aerospace Defense Command alerted the base at 8:41 to be put on battle stations. Four minutes later, Lieutenant Colonel Timothy Duffy and Major Daniel Nash were scrambled and flew F-15 Eagle fighters out of the base heading toward New York City to intercept American Airlines Flight 11. They departed somewhere between 8:46 and 8:52. Both pilots were interviewed in the 2006 documentary Flight 175: As the World Watched.

== Environmental issues ==
Military operations in the early years at Otis AFB included the use of petroleum products and other hazardous materials, such as fuels, motor oils, and cleaning solvents, and the generation of associated wastes. It was common practice for many years to dispose of such wastes in landfills, dry wells, sumps, and the sewage treatment plant. Spills and leaks also occurred. These activities had a serious impact on the Upper Cape's groundwater resources; much of the water supply in the surrounding area was converted from wells to municipal water sources as a direct result of the threats from waste plumes in the groundwater.

Residents of nearby towns raised concerns about possible adverse effects on health of humans resulting from PAVE PAWS radiation. Remediation on the site occurred in 1998 and a 2005 report from the National Academies Press found no evidence of adverse health effects from PAVE PAWS. In 2012, a wind turbine started operating in the area which is powering 25-30% of the energy used in the remediation effort.

== Accidents and incidents ==
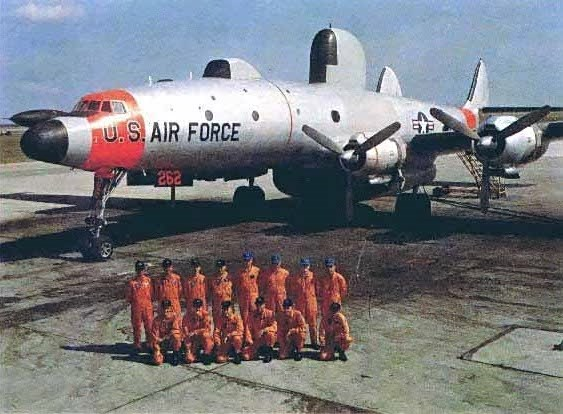
A crew photo of the EC-121H Warning Star (s/n 55-5262, ex-USN BuNo 141289) at Otis Air Force Base. This aircraft crashed off the island of Nantucket, Massachusetts on 11 November 1966, 40 minutes after takeoff from Otis due to engine problems, killing all 19 crewmembers aboard.

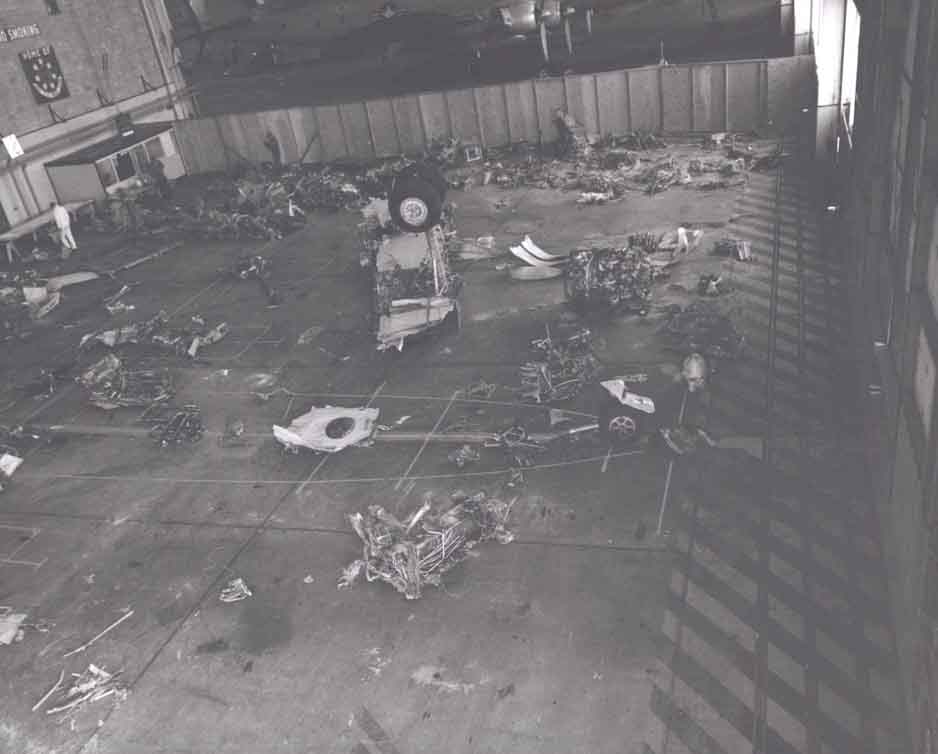
Parts of 53-0549 that were salvaged from the Atlantic after the plane ditched and exploded on April 25, 1967 at Nantucket Island, Massachusetts. The parts are displayed in a large maintenance hangar at Otis.

- 14 February 1951: Major Raymond S. Wetmore, World War II ace (21.25 kills) and commander of the 59th Fighter-Interceptor Squadron at Otis Air Force Base, is killed in the crash of F-86A-5-NA Sabre, 48-0149, c/n 151-43517 at age 27, after a cross-country flight from Los Angeles to Otis. He was on his final approach when his plane suddenly shot skyward and then turned towards the ground where it crashed. Wetmore was killed instantly. He was reported to have said that he had trouble steering and ejecting from the plane. He was also reported to have said to the tower, "I'm going to go up and bring it down in Wakeby Lake, so I don't hit any houses."
- 25 May 1958: USAF Lockheed RC-121D-LO Warning Star, 55-123, of the 551st AEWCW, burns out on the ramp at Otis; 0 dead.
- 11 July 1965: A USAF Lockheed EC-121H-LO Warning Star, 55-136, of the 551st AEWCW, develops a fire in the number three (starboard inner) engine, attempts ditching in the North Atlantic approximately 100 miles east of Nantucket. Night touchdown while on fire proves difficult, aircraft crashes and breaks apart. Three of the 19 people on board survive. Seven of the crew bodies are never recovered.
- 11 November 1966: A USAF Lockheed EC-121H-LO Warning Star of the 551st AEWCW, out of Otis AFB, Massachusetts, crashes in the North Atlantic ~125 miles E of Nantucket, Massachusetts by unexplained circumstances, approximately the same general area as the one lost 11 July 1965. All 19 crew members are KWF, bodies never recovered.
- 25 April 1967- A USAF Lockheed EC-121H-LO Warning Star, 53-549, of the 551st AEWCW, out of Otis AFB, Massachusetts, ditches in the North Atlantic ~one mile off of Nantucket, Massachusetts, just after having taken off from that base. One survivor, 15 crew KWF. Five bodies were not recovered. Col. James P. Lyle, the Commander of the 551st AEW&C Wing to which all the aircraft and crew members were assigned, was the pilot. Colonel Lyle had been assigned to take over that command nine months earlier. It was he who presented each of the next of kin of 11 November 1966 crash victims with the United States Flag during that memorial service.
- 14 November 1967- Two McDonnell F-101B Voodoos of the 60th Fighter-Interceptor Squadron, out of Otis AFB, Massachusetts, collide over Maine during a cross-country formation flight. Aircraft 57-376 is destroyed crashing on Mount Abraham after the two-man crew ejects with minor injuries. The uninjured crew of moderately damaged aircraft 57-378 makes an emergency landing at Dow AFB, Maine.
- Fuel delivery truck crashes at Otis Rotary have caused fires, treated with fire fighting foam, which has seeped into the groundwater and contaminated drinking water with perfluorinated organic compounds (PFC's). Three homes in a Pocasset, Massachusetts neighborhood have also been receiving bottled water.

== Previous units ==
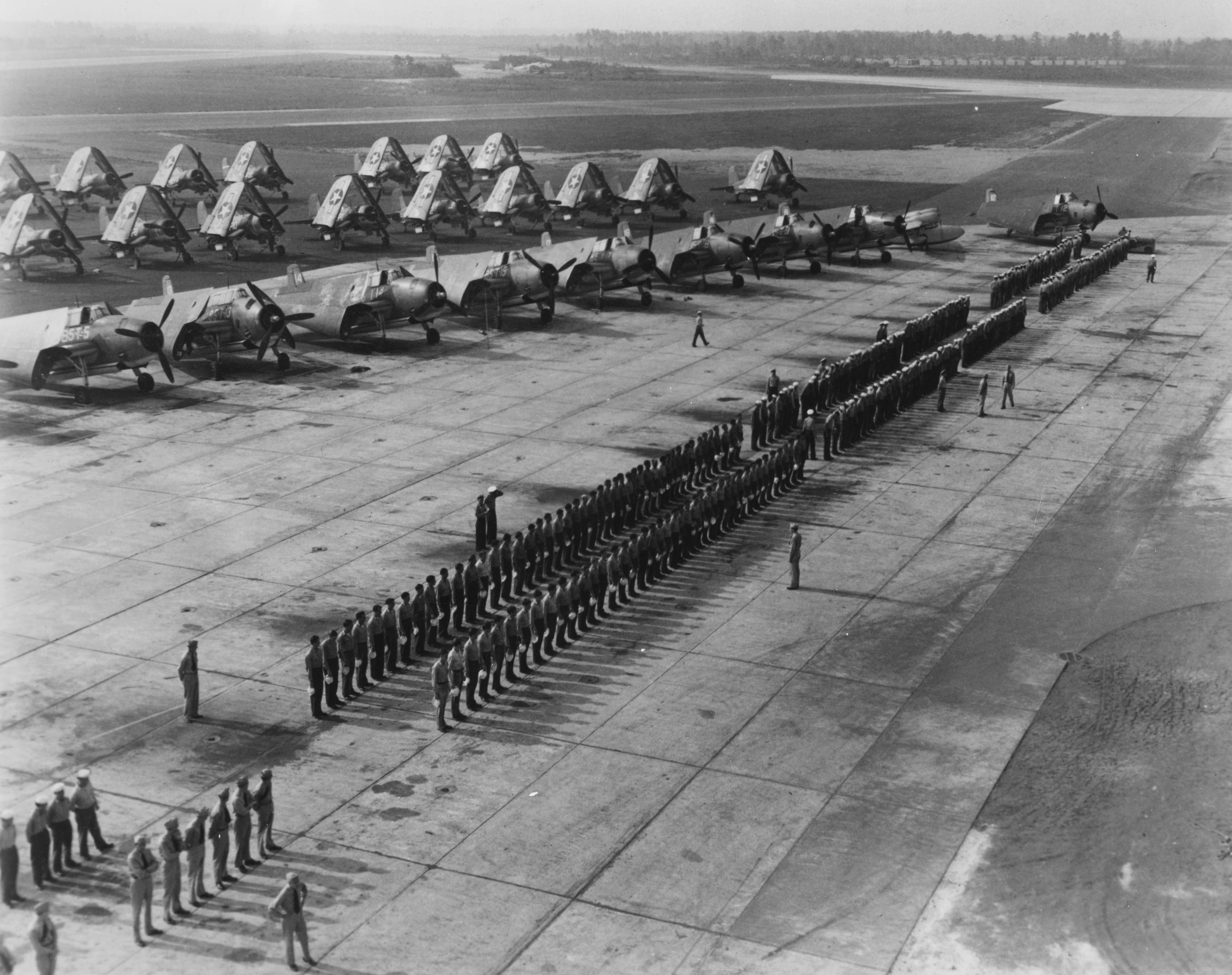
View of an inspection at Otis Field in August, 1944

- VB-74
- VT-74
- 1st Special Operations Wing (1969–1972)
- 19th Air Refueling Squadron (Detached from main wing) (1960–1966)
  - GSU / Detached from the 4050th Air Refueling Wing, Westover AFB, Massachusetts (1960–1963)
  - GSU / Detached from the 499th Air Refueling Wing, Westover AFB, Massachusetts (1963–1966)
- Detachment 1, 99th Bombardment Wing, (A KC-135 Satellite Alert unit)
  - GSU / Detached from the 99th Bombardment Wing, Westover AFB, Massachusetts (1969–1972)
- Detachment 1, 416th Bombardment Wing, (A KC-135 Satellite Alert unit)
  - GSU / Detached from the 416th Bombardment Wing, Griffiss AFB, New York (1969–1972)
- 102nd Tactical Air Command Hospital
- 119th Aircraft Control & Warning Squadron (1952–1953)
- 26th Air Defense Missile Squadron (1961–1972)
- 50th Fighter-Interceptor Wing (1949–1951)
  - 437th Fighter-Interceptor Squadron 1952-1955 (First operational unit with the F-94C)
- 564th Air Defense Group, 33rd Fighter Wing, (Air Defense) (1948–1957)
  - 58th Fighter-Interceptor Squadron 1948-1959 (F-84B, F-86A, F-94B, F-89D/H/J)
  - 59th Fighter-Interceptor Squadron 1948-1952 (F-84B, F-86A, F-94A/B)
  - 60th Fighter-Interceptor Squadron 1948-1950 (F-84B), 1955-1971 (F-94C, First to fly the F-101B Voodoo)
  - 81st Fighter Squadron (1949–1951)
- 4604th Support Squadron (Supported Texas Towers, #2, #3, and #4.)
- 4707th Air Defense Wing
  - 4735th Air Defense Group
    - 4713th Defense Systems Evaluation Squadron
- 4784th Air Base Group
- 551st Airborne Early Warning and Control Wing (1954–1969)
  - 960th Airborne Early Warning and Control Squadron (1955–1969)
  - 961st Airborne Early Warning and Control Squadron (1955–1969)
  - 962d Airborne Early Warning and Control Squadron (1955–1969)
  - 966th Airborne Early Warning and Control Squadron (1961–1962)
  - 551st Electronics Maintenance Squadron
  - 551st Field Maintenance Squadron
  - 551st Periodic (Later: Organizational) Maintenance Squadron
  - 551st Air Base (Later: Combat Support)Group
  - 551st Air Police (Later: Security Police) Squadron
  - 551st Food Service (Later: Services) Squadron
  - 551st Installations (Later: Civil Engineering) Squadron
  - 551st Motor Vehicle (Later: Transportation) Squadron
  - 551st Supply Squadron
- Otis Air Force Base Hospital
  - 551st USAF Hospital Squadron
- 553rd Reconnaissance Wing Batcats (1967)
  - 553rd Reconnaissance Squadron
  - 554th Reconnaissance Squadron
  - 553rd Electronic Maintenance Squadron
  - 553rd Field Maintenance Squadron
  - 553rd Organizational Maintenance Squadron
- Wing unknown
  - 617th Aircraft Control and Warning Squadron (1 Nov 1953-December 1954)
  - 622nd Aircraft Control and Warning Squadron (1 Sep 1953- Dec 1954)
  - 630th Aircraft Control and Warning Squadron (7 Jan 1954-8 Sep 1954)
  - 643d Aircraft Control and Warning Squadron (1 Sep 1953-15 Jul 1954)
  - 673rd Aircraft Control and Warning Squadron (1 Sep 1953-1 Aug 1954)
  - 932d Aircraft Control and Warning Squadron (11 May 1952-Sep 1952)
- Air Defense Command Non-Commissioned Officer Academy
- Boston Air Defense Sector
- Note: The Lockheed YF-12 was supposed to be stationed at Otis. This would have either meant the creation of three new squadrons, or the reuse of the above squadrons.

== Notable associations ==
- Arnold W. Braswell, Lieutenant General, United States Air Force, with the 33rd Fighter Wing, flew F-86 Sabrejets.
- James M. Kelly, Astronaut.
- Daniel James Jr., first African-American four-star general, was assigned to Otis AFB from 1951 to 1956. He served as a pilot with the 58th Fighter-Interceptor Squadron, commander of the 437th Fighter-Interceptor Squadron, and commander of the 60th Fighter-Interceptor Squadron.
- Charles Sweeney, commanded Bockscar, the B-29 that dropped Fat Man on Nagasaki, later 102nd Air Defense Wing commander.
- Raymond S. Wetmore, 59th Fighter Squadron commander.
- Ruth Allen, singer.
- Arval J. Roberson, Last commander of Otis Air Force Base and World War II ace.

== Monuments ==
In a rotary near the original main gate to the base, is a Lockheed F-94 Starfire (tail number 51-4335) which was, presumably, flown by future General Daniel "Chappie" James Jr. when he was a squadron commander at Otis AFB in the 1950s. James' name is written on the fuselage of the aircraft near the canopy.

There is also a static display of an F-15 Eagle on Camp Edwards adjacent to Otis AFB.

== Amateur radio restrictions ==
The US Code of Federal Regulations specifies that amateur radio operators within 160 kilometers of Otis must not transmit with more than 50 watts of power on the 70-centimeter band.

== See also ==
- Massachusetts World War II Army Airfields
- Eastern Air Defense Force (Air Defense Command)
- List of military installations in Massachusetts
