= Frank Otis =

American surgeon (1905-1937)

Frank "Jesse" Otis (June 19, 1905 – January 11, 1937) was a Boston surgeon and flight surgeon for the Massachusetts Air National Guard's 101st Observation Squadron who was memorialized after his death when Otis Field was named after him.

== Biography ==
Frank Otis was born on 19 June 1905 in Chicago, Illinois to Frank J. Otis, Sr. and Mabel Howe. Frank was an intern at the Boston City Hospital. He was a graduate of the Harvard University Medical School. He was also a member of the 101st Observation Squadron, based at Camp Edwards on Cape Cod. On January 11, 1937, while traveling to his parents' house in Moline, Illinois, his plane went down in the Illinois River near Hennepin. At the time of his death, he was a Second Lieutenant in the Air National Guard. The official military explanation says that he was killed on a cross country training mission, and this is backed up by the fact that he was flying a Douglas O-46A. In 1938, the airfield at Camp Edwards was named Otis Field after him.
