= 377th Bombardment Group =

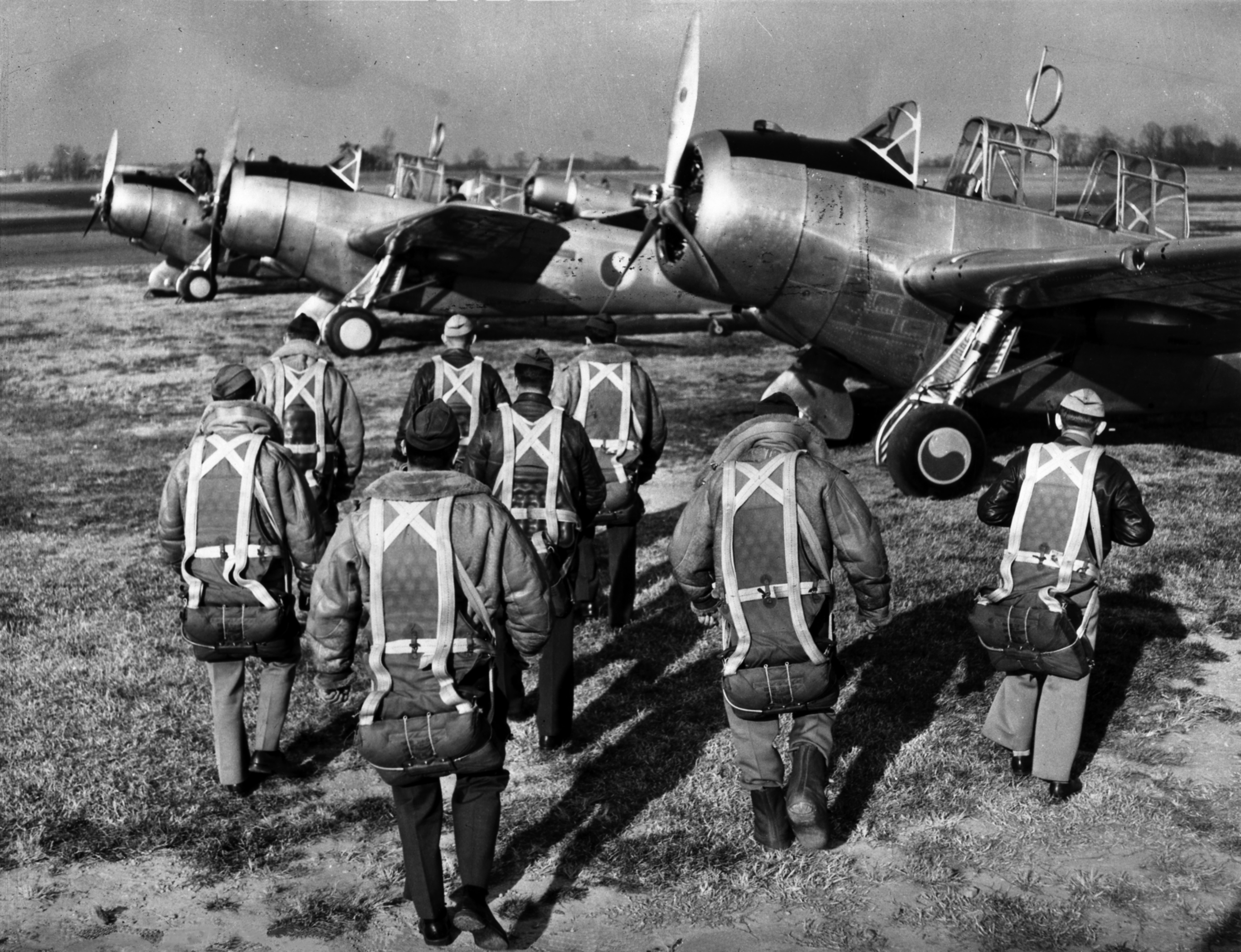
- 104th Observation Squadron O-47s
- Active: 1942
- Country: United States
- Branch: United States Air Force
- Role: Bombardment
- Part of: AAF Antisubmarine Command
- Engagements: Antisubmarine

The 377th Bombardment Group was activated in October 1942 as the headquarters for antisubmarine units operating along the Atlantic coast of the United States. Shortly after it was organized, Army Air Forces Antisubmarine Command reorganized its squadrons in the area to reassign them directly to the 25th Antisubmarine Wing and the group was inactivated. In 1985, the group was redesignated the 357th Tactical Missile Group.

== History ==
The group was first activated as the 377th Bombardment Group on 18 October 1942, when it replaced the 59th Observation Group at Fort Dix Army Air Field and assumed its mission, personnel and equipment. It was equipped with the various observation aircraft flown by the 59th, but its squadrons would finally convert to North American B-25 Mitchell bombers shortly after the 377th was inactivated. only one of the group's squadrons, the 516th Bombardment Squadron, was located with it at Fort Dix. Its 517th Bombardment Squadron was at Atlantic City Airport, New Jersey; the 518th Bombardment Squadron was at Grenier Field, New Hampshire; while the 519th Bombardment Squadron made its home at Hyannis Naval Auxiliary Air Facility, Massachusetts.

Just as the group was activating, the Army Air Forces organized its antisubmarine forces into the single Army Air Forces Antisubmarine Command, which established the 25th Antisubmarine Wing the following month to control its forces operating over the Atlantic. The group's squadrons were all renamed as antisubmarine squadrons in late November. The command's bombardment group headquarters, including the 377th, were inactivated and the group's squadrons were assigned directly to the 25th Wing.

In July 1985, the group was redesignated the 357th Tactical Missile Wing, but it has never been active under this name.

== Lineage ==
- Constituted as the 377th Bombardment Group (Heavy) on 13 October 1942

Activated on 18 October 1942
Inactivated on 9 December 1942

- Redesignated 357th Tactical Missile Wing on 19 July 1985

=== Assignments ===
- Army Air Forces Antisubmarine Command, 18 October 1942 – 9 December 1942

=== Components ===
- 516th Bombardment Squadron (later 11th Antisubmarine Squadron), 18 October – 9 December 1942
- 517th Bombardment Squadron (later 12th Antisubmarine Squadron), 18 October – 9 December 1942
- 518th Bombardment Squadron (later 13th Antisubmarine Squadron), 18 October – 9 December 1942 (attached to Army Air Forces Antisubmarine Command) (Note: Maurer, in Combat Units says the squadron was assigned to the 377th Group, but in Combat Squadrons says it was assigned to the 25th Wing. Maurer, Combat Units, pp. 265-266; Maurer, Combat Squadrons, pp. 786-787)
- 519th Bombardment Squadron (later 14th Antisubmarine Squadron), 18 October – 9 December 1942

=== Stations ===
- Fort Dix Army Air Base, New Jersey, 18 October 1942 – 9 December 1942

=== Aircraft ===
- Douglas O-46
- North American O-47
- Stinson O-49 Vigilant
- Curtiss O-52 Owl

=== Campaign ===
Campaign Streamer	Campaign	Dates	Notes
	Antisubmarine	18 October 1942 – 9 December 1942	377th Bombardment Group
