= 863rd Bombardment Squadron =

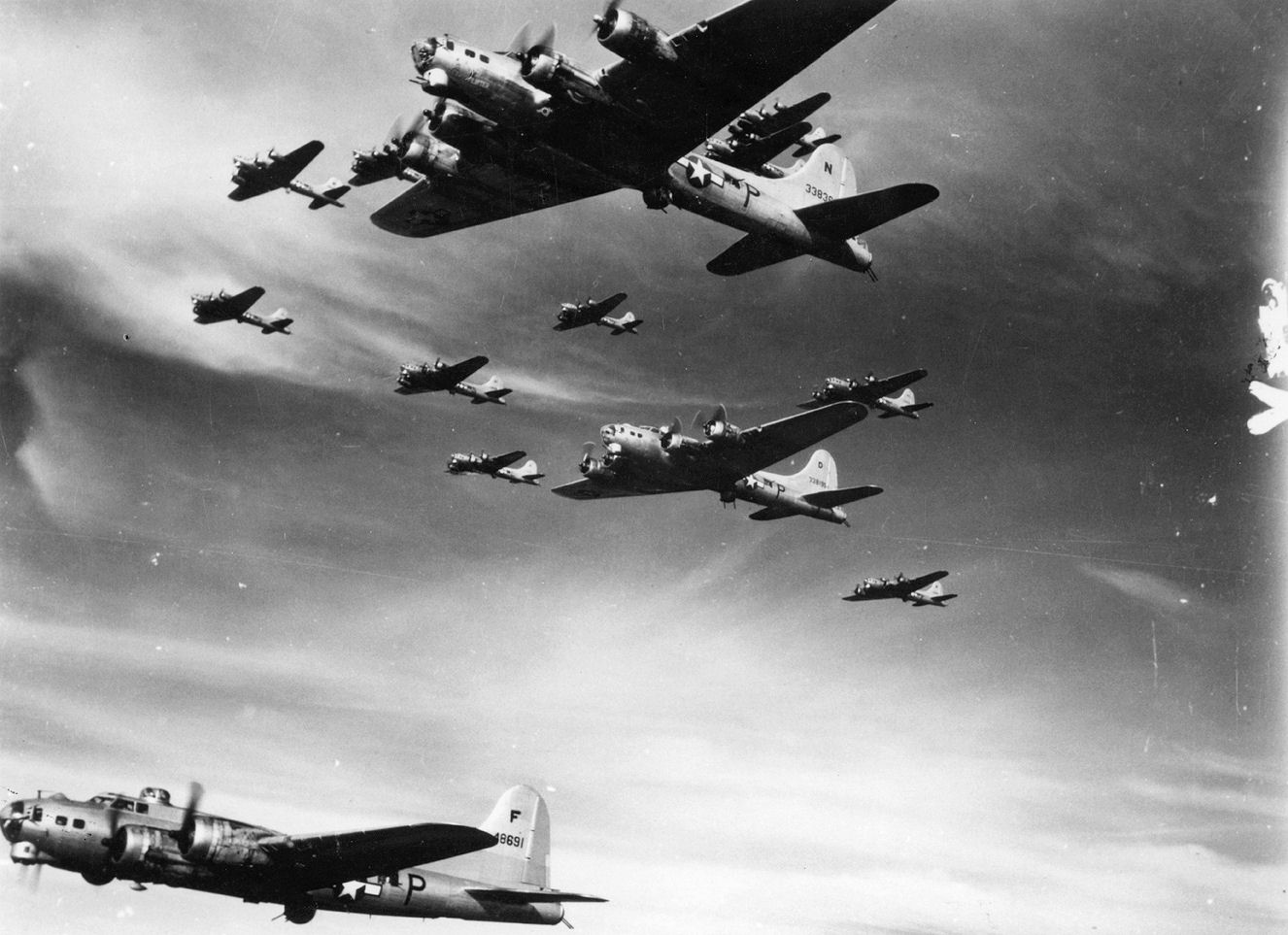
- 493rd Bombardment Group B-17 Flying Fortress formation
- Country: United States
- Branch: United States Air Force
- Role: Heavy bomber
- Engagements: European Theater of Operations

Insignia
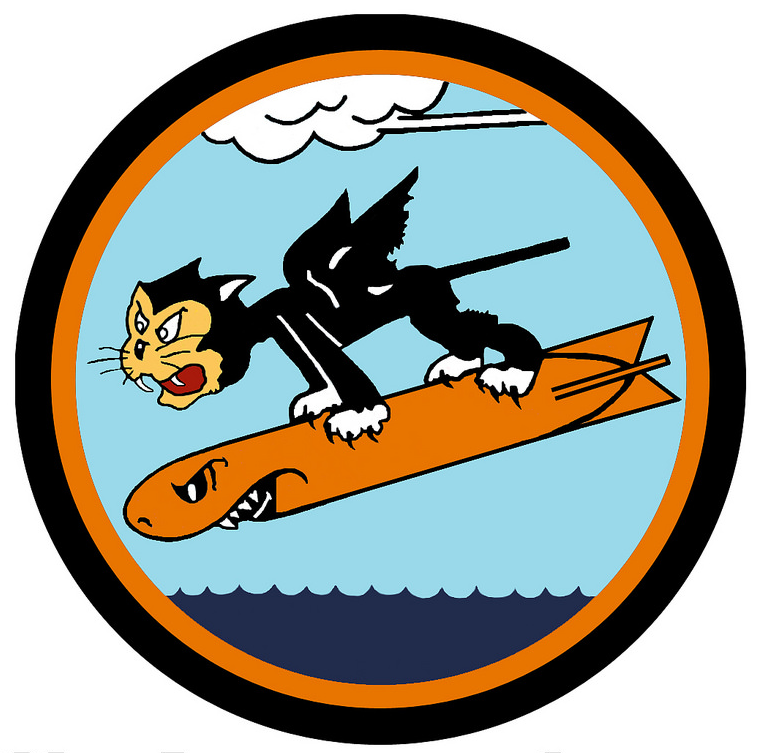
- 863rd Bombardment Squadron emblem (Note: Approved 13 May 1943 for 13th Antisubmaire Squadron. Description: on a disc per fess debased invected light blue and dark blue, within a border of equally divided rings of black and golden orange, a winged black cat, yellow face, red tongue, and white paws, riding an aerial torpedo golden orange with a shark's face and eye on nose, all emitting speed lines white, falling to dexter base; a white cloud formation outlined in black in chief.)

The 863rd Bombardment Squadron is a former United States Army Air Forces unit. It was first organized as the 518th Bombardment Squadron in October 1942, when it replaced a National Guard unit participating in antisubmarine patrols off the Atlantic coast, becoming the 13th Antisubmarine Squadron in November. When the Navy took over the coastal antisubmarine mission in August 1943, the squadron moved to the western United States, where it formed the cadre for the 493rd Bombardment Group and was redesignated as the 863rd. It moved to England in the spring of 1944 and participated in the strategic bombing campaign against Germany until April 1945. It returned to the United States and was inactivated in August 1945.

== History ==
=== Antisubmarine warfare ===
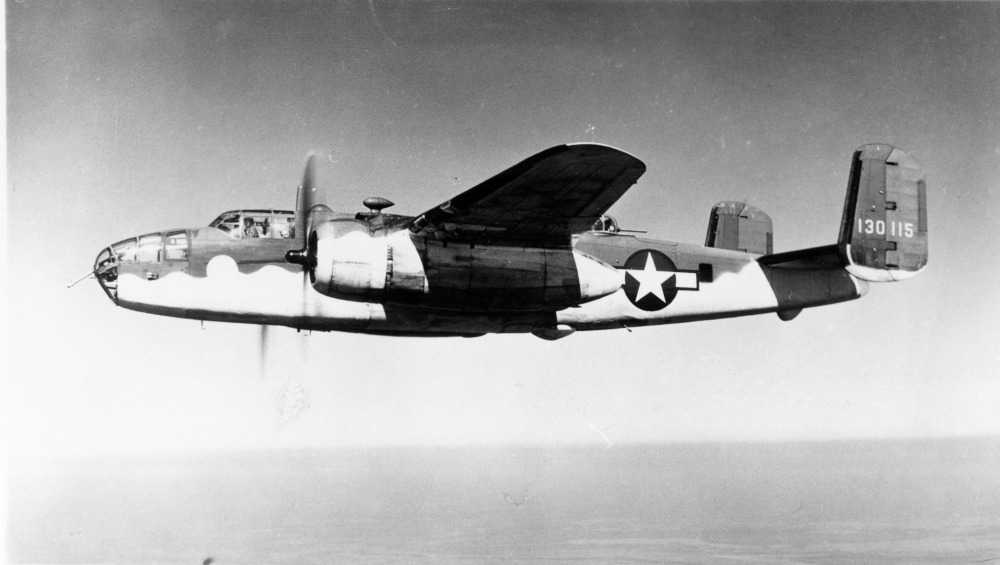
B-25D in antisubmarine camouflage

The squadron was first activated at Grenier Field, New Hampshire as the 518th Bombardment Squadron on 18 October 1942, when the 377th Bombardment Group replaced the 59th Observation Group at Fort Dix Army Air Field, New Jersey, and assumed its mission, personnel and equipment. The 518th was formed with the personnel and North American O-47s of the 119th Observation Squadron, a New Jersey National Guard unit, which was simultaneously inactivated. It converted to North American B-25 Mitchells the following year. The squadrons of the 377th Group were at various bases along the coast between Delaware and New Hampshire.

In October 1942, the Army Air Forces organized its antisubmarine forces into the single Army Air Forces Antisubmarine Command, which established the 25th Antisubmarine Wing the following month to control its forces operating over the Atlantic. Its bombardment group headquarters, including the 377th, were inactivated and the squadron, now designated the 13th Antisubmarine Squadron, was assigned directly to the 25th Wing. In July 1943, the AAF and Navy reached an agreement to transfer the coastal antisubmarine mission to the Navy. This mission transfer also included an exchange of AAF long-range bombers equipped for antisubmarine warfare for Navy Consolidated B-24 Liberators without such equipment.

=== Training as a heavy bombardment unit in the United States ===
In September 1943, the 518th moved to Pueblo Army Air Base, Colorado, where it became part of Second Air Force. On 1 November 1943, the squadron was redesignated as the 863rd Bombardment Squadron and Second Air Force moved it to McCook Army Air Field, where it formed the cadre for the 493rd Bombardment Group. At the beginning of January, the squadron transferred on paper to Elveden Hall, (Note: Elveden Hall was a manor house, not an airfield. Anderson, pp. 9, 12.) England. The ground personnel of the squadron in the United States had been used to form Boeing B-29 Superfortress units being activated by Second Air Force, while the air echelon remained in Nebraska to conduct training on their assigned Consolidated B-24 Liberators. Meanwhile, Eighth Air Force formed a new ground echelon for the squadron in England from other units assigned to the 3d Bombardment Division. This ground echelon moved to the squadron's combat station, RAF Debach, in April 1944. The squadron's air echelon departed for England via the northern ferry route on 1 May, while a small ground component left McCook and sailed from Boston, Massachusetts on the SS Brazil (1928) on 12 May 1944.

=== Combat in the European Theater ===
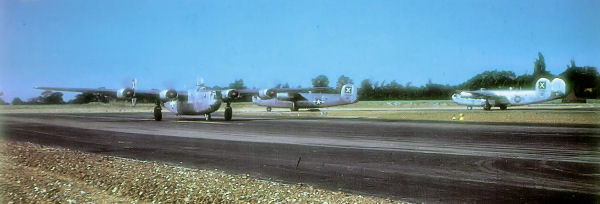
B-24s of the 493d Bomb Group at Debach

The squadron flew its first combat mission on D-Day, 6 June 1944. It continued to fly Liberators until 24 August 1944, when it was withdrawn from combat to convert to Boeing B-17 Flying Fortresses, along with other units of the 93rd Bombardment Wing, as Eighth Air Force concentrated all its Liberators in the 2nd Bombardment Division. It resumed combat missions with the B-17 on 8 September 1944. The squadron concentrated its attacks on military and industrial targets in Germany, attacking an ordnance depot in Magdeburg, factories near Frankfurt, and a synthetic oil manufacturing plant at Merseburg. It also attacked lines of communications, including a railroad tunnel at Ahrweiler, bridges at Irlich, and marshalling yards near Cologne.

The squadron was occasionally diverted from the strategic bombing campaign to attack tactical targets. It supported Operation Overlord, the Normandy invasion, striking artillery batteries, airfields and bridges. It struck enemy ground forces south of Caen and during Operation Cobra, the breakout at St Lo. It bombed German fortifications to support Operation Market Garden, airborne attacks attempting to secure a bridgehead across the Rhine in the Netherlands, and attacked communications during the Battle of the Bulge. Toward the end of the war, it also supported Operation Varsity, the airborne assault across the Rhine in Germany.

The squadron flew its last combat mission against marshalling yards near Nauen on 20 April 1945, although it flew food-dropping missions in early May. The squadron air echelon departed Debach on 30 June, while the ground echelon sailed for home aboard the RMS Queen Elizabeth on 6 August 1945. In late August, the squadron assembled at Sioux Falls Army Air Field, South Dakota, where it was inactivated on 28 August 1945.

== Lineage ==
- Constituted as the 518th Bombardment Squadron (Heavy) on 13 October 1942

Activated on 18 October 1942
Redesignated: 13th Antisubmarine Squadron (Heavy) on 29 November 1942
Redesignated: 863rd Bombardment Squadron, Heavy on 1 November 1943
Inactivated on 28 August 1945

=== Assignments ===
- 377th Bombardment Group (attached to Army Air Forces Antisubmarine Command), 18 October 1942
- 25th Antisubmarine Wing, 9 December 1942
- Second Air Force, 22 September 1943
- 493rd Bombardment Group, 1 November 1943 – 28 August 1945

=== Stations ===
- Grenier Field, New Hampshire, 18 October 1942
- Pueblo Army Air Base, Colorado, 22 September 1943
- McCook Army Air Field, Nebraska, 1 November 1943 – 1 January 1944
- Elveden Hall (Station 116), England, 1 January 1944
- RAF Debach (AAF-152), England, 17 April 1944 – 6 August 1945
- Sioux Falls Army Air Field, South Dakota, c. 13–28 Aug 1945

=== Aircraft ===
- North American O-47, 1942–1943
- North American B-25 Mitchell, 1943
- Consolidated B-24 Liberator, 1943–1944
- Boeing B-17 Flying Fortress, 1944–1945

=== Campaigns ===
Campaign Streamer	Campaign	Dates	Notes
	Antisubmarine	18 October 1942–1 August 1943	518th Bombardment Squadron (later 13th Antisubmarine Squadron)
	Air Combat, EAME Theater	1 January 1944–11 May 1945	863rd Bombardment Squadron
	Normandy	6 June 1944–24 July 1944	863rd Bombardment Squadron
	Northern France	25 July 1944–14 September 1944	863rd Bombardment Squadron
	Rhineland	15 September 1944–21 March 1945	863rd Bombardment Squadron
	Ardennes-Alsace	16 December 1944–25 January 1945	863rd Bombardment Squadron
	Central Europe	22 March 1944–21 May 1945	863rd Bombardment Squadron

== See also ==
- B-17 Flying Fortress units of the United States Army Air Forces
- B-24 Liberator units of the United States Army Air Forces
