= Pine Hill (Barnstable County, Massachusetts) =

Hill in the U.S. state of Massachusetts

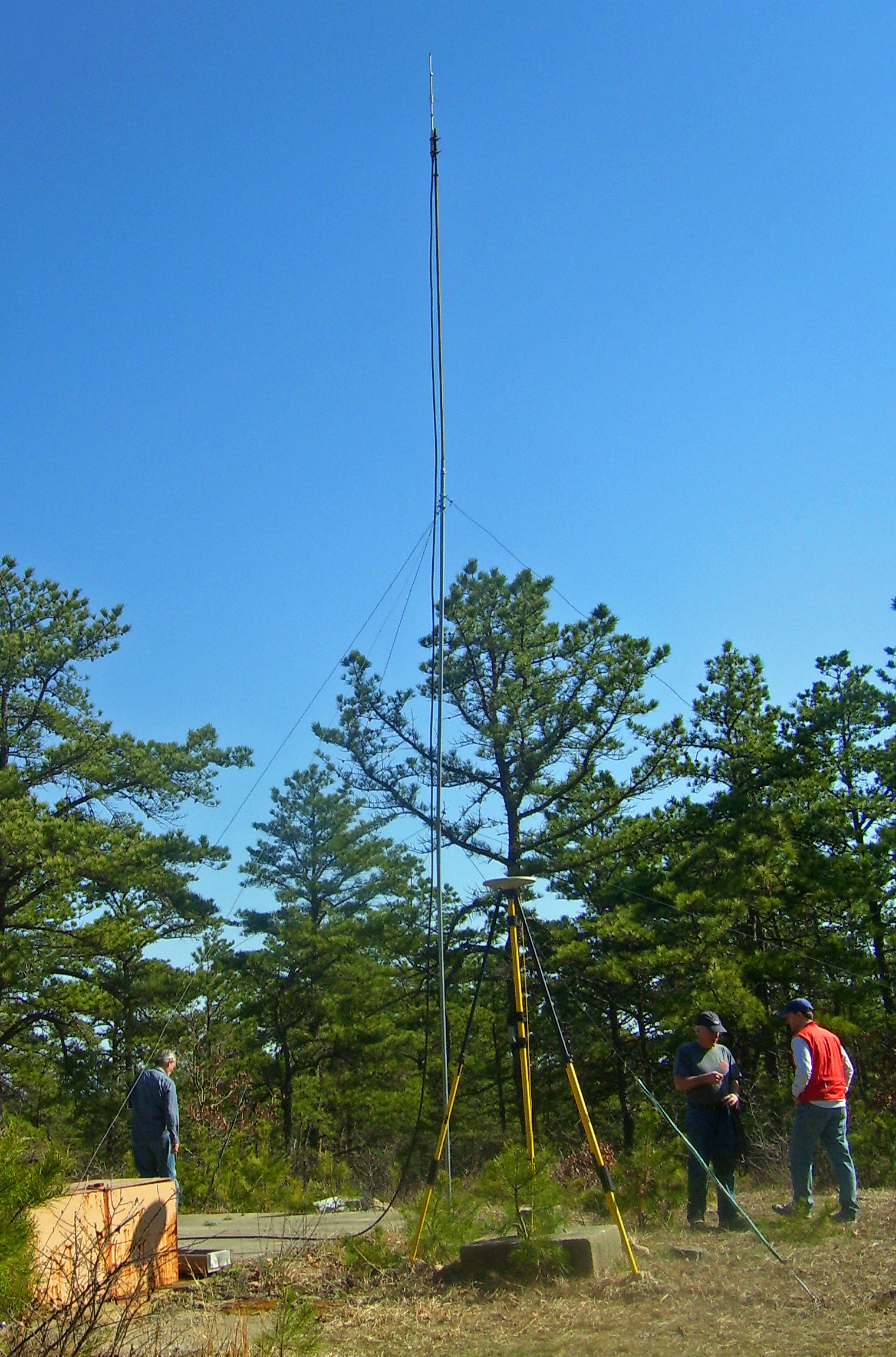
- The summit of Pine Hill in Bourne, Massachusetts

Highest point
- Elevation: 306 ft (93 m)
- Prominence: 306 ft (93 m)
- Coordinates: 41°42′31″N 70°33′56″W

Geography
- Location: Bourne, MA, U.S.
- Parent range: Buzzards Bay Moraine
- Topo map: USGS Pocasset

Climbing
- Easiest route: Road

Pine Hill, in Bourne, Massachusetts, United States, is the highest point in Barnstable County and, by extension, Cape Cod. At 306 feet (93 m), it is higher than Dennis's 160-foot (49 m) Scargo Hill, sometimes thought to be the highest on the peninsula, among other local favorites.

It is located off Frank Perkins Road, within the Camp Edwards portion of the Massachusetts Military Reservation. Access to it is restricted, not only because it is on a military facility but because it lies at the rear of an artillery range.

== Natural history and geography ==
The hill is part of Buzzards Bay Moraine, created over ten thousand years ago by retreating glaciers at the end of the last ice age. It is two miles (3.2 km) inland from Buzzards Bay itself and a mile from Massachusetts Route 28. The area is distinguished by sandy soil, bouldery till and an abundance of the pitch pine that gives the hill its name. Lower, hummocky hills and a few small glacial ponds make up the surrounding landscape.

The hill was noted as a prominent feature of the Cape Cod landscape as early as 1874, when it was still part of the town of Sandwich (Bourne would not be created for another ten years). Military use of the surrounding area began in 1911; in 1935 the state created and began building the Massachusetts Military Reservation complex after the Massachusetts National Guard outgrew Fort Devens. Other than the road near it, the Pine Hill area has remained mostly undeveloped. Then-governor Paul Cellucci wanted to convert the area into a state conservation area in 1999, but dropped the plan after the Guard objected.

== Approach ==
Members of the public may visit Pine Hill, but must arrange advance permission through the base's Public Affairs Office (PAO) and show identification when visiting the base. These requirements were in place prior to the September 11 attacks, but have been more rigorously enforced since then.

A PAO escort leads visitors over several miles of roads to a range station on a rise near the hill. From there it is a short walk down Frank Perkins to a narrow road leading up a gentle slope an even shorter distance to the summit of Pine Hill, a small clearing with a USGS benchmark set in a small concrete monument at the middle marking the 306-foot (93 m) elevation. It is necessary to stay on the road and path because of the possibility of unexploded ordnance in the woods. Surveying and meteorological research equipment is sometimes located at the summit. Any view is obscured by surrounding trees.
