= Shawme-Crowell State Forest =

State forest in Massachusetts. US

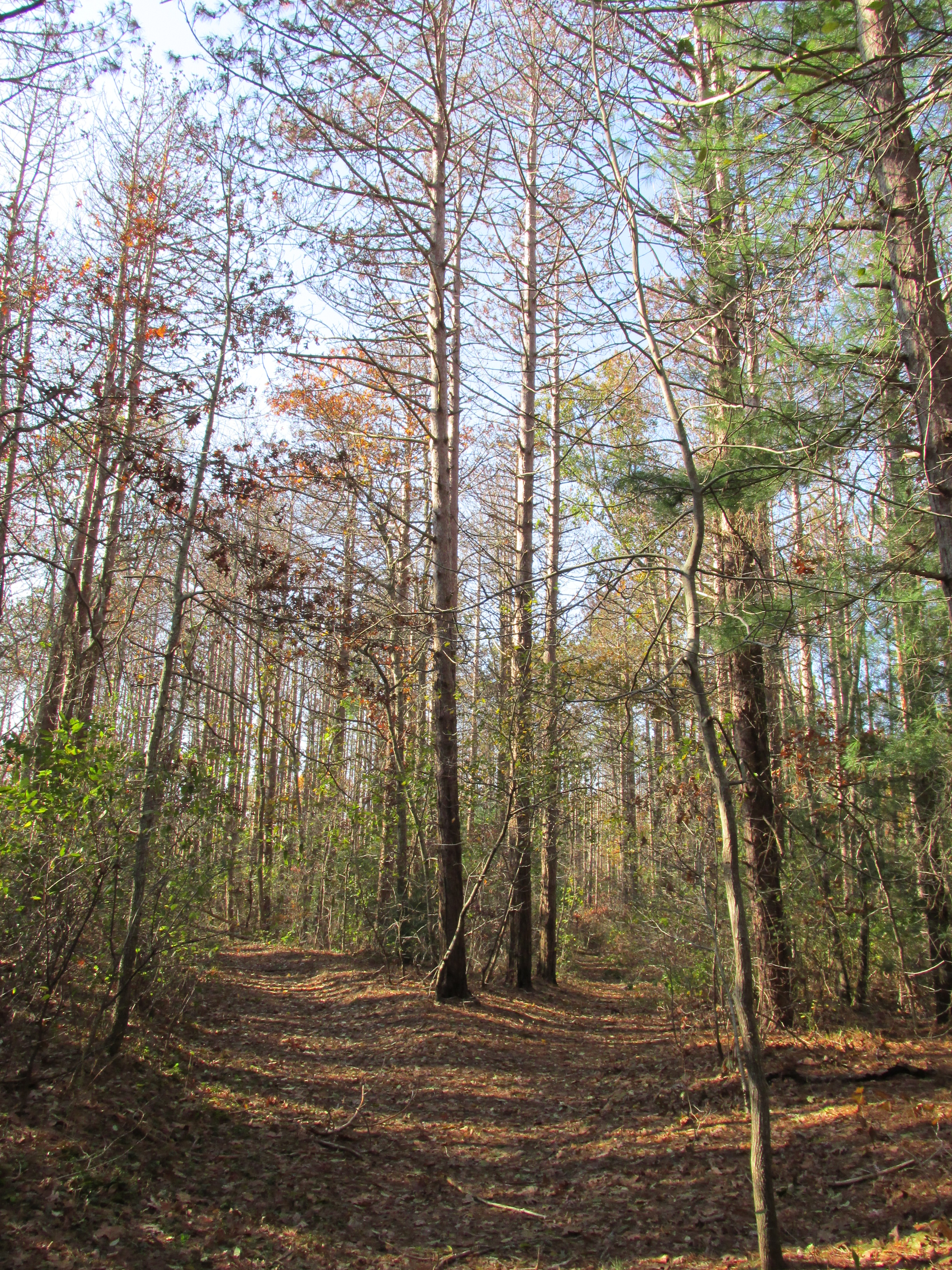

- Location within Massachusetts Location within the United States
- Location: Sandwich, Massachusetts, United States
- Coordinates: 41°45′14″N 70°30′44″W
- Area: 624 acres (253 ha)
- Elevation: 161 ft (49 m)
- Established: 1985
- Administrator: Massachusetts Department of Conservation and Recreation
- Website: Official website

Shawme-Crowell State Forest is a Massachusetts state forest located in the town of Sandwich in Barnstable County. The forest lost much of its original acreage with the creation of Camp Edwards, which is part of the modern-day Joint Base Cape Cod. The forest is made up of pitch pine and scrub oaks and is managed by the Department of Conservation and Recreation.

== Activities and amenities ==
The forest's two campgrounds offer more than 280 seasonal camp sites and access to Scusset Beach State Reservation. Over 15 miles of roads and trails are available for hiking, biking, cross-country skiing, and horseback riding.
