= 101st Intelligence Squadron =

United States air force unit

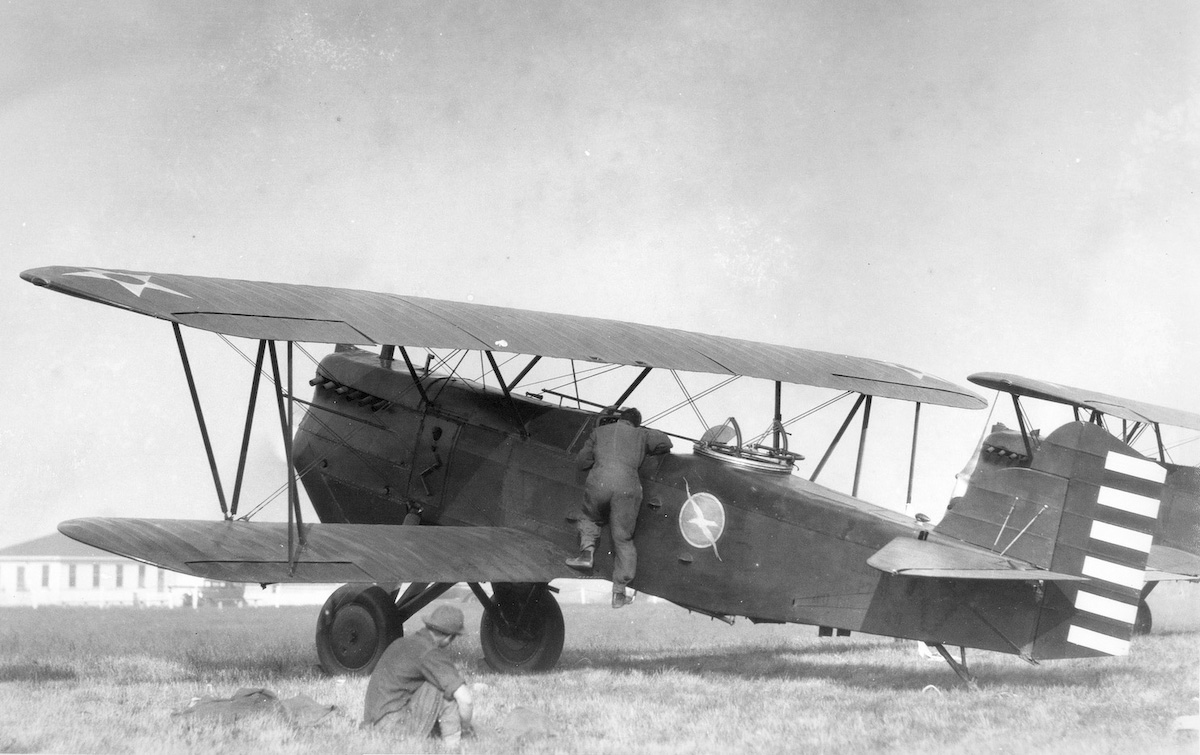
- 101st Observation Squadron, Massachusetts NG (divisional aviation, 26th Division) Curtis O-11, about 1925
- Active: 18 November 1921–Present
- Country: United States
- Allegiance: Massachusetts
- Branch: Air National Guard
- Type: Squadron
- Role: Intelligence, Surveillance and Reconnaissance (ISR)
- Part of: Massachusetts Air National Guard
- Garrison/HQ: Otis Air National Guard Base, Mashpee, Massachusetts
- Motto: "Omnis Vir Tigris "Everyone A Tiger""
- Engagements: World War I World War II

Insignia
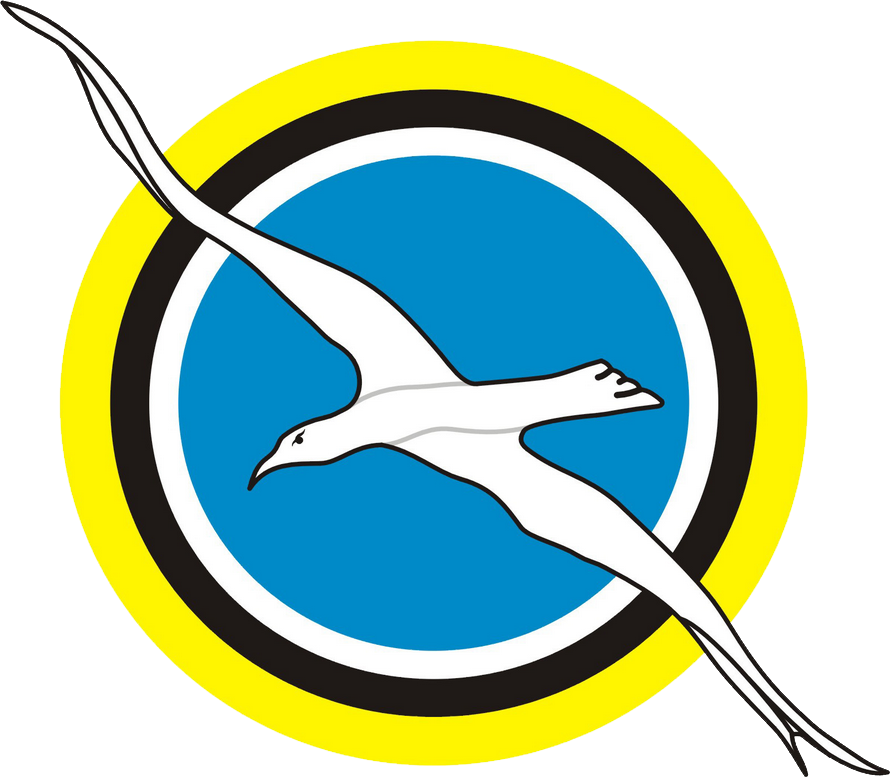
- 101st Intelligence Squadron emblem

The United States Air Force's 101st Intelligence Squadron (101 IS), Massachusetts Air National Guard, is an intelligence unit assigned to the 102nd Intelligence Wing and located at Otis Air National Guard Base, Massachusetts. From its creation in 1921 to its mission change in 2008, the 101st was the mainstay of aerospace defence for the Northeastern United States. The 101st was deployed during the Berlin Crisis to France and was also deployed to Panama during Operation Coronet Nighthawk. It also participated in Operation Northern Watch. During the September 11 attacks, the 101st was the first Air Force unit to send aircraft toward New York City, but they arrived too late to help stop the attacks.

Base downsizing through the Base Realignment and Closure (BRAC) process removed the wing's F-15C Eagles beginning in 2007, leaving the 101st with an intelligence gathering mission that will be fully active starting in 2010. It is one of three Air National Guard wings that works with the Air Force Intelligence, Surveillance and Reconnaissance Agency.

== History ==
=== World War I ===
The squadron has its origins at Kelly Field, Texas, being organized as the 101st Aero Squadron on 22 August 1918. The personnel were composed of new recruits from various Recruit Barracks, including Fort McDowell, Vancouver Barracks, Fort Sam Houston, Columbus Barracks, Fort Williams, Fort Warren and Fort Oglethorpe.

During September 1917, it was found necessary to transfer many of its men. Altogether, 113 men were transferred out and 32 transferred in, leaving the squadron well below its authorized strength. In October, the squadron was again filled up to a required total of 150 recruits.

After basic indoctrination into the military, on 29 October, the squadron was ordered to overseas service, being ordered to report to the Aviation Concentration Center, Garden City, Long Island. Arrived at Camp Mills on 3 November. A wave of measles and mumps plagued the squadron, and it was placed in the Quarantine barracks for several weeks. It received orders to report to the Port of Entry, Philadelphia for immediate transport to France in mid-December 1917, sailing on the SS Northland on 4 December. It arrived in Liverpool, England on Christmas Day, after spending a week at Halifax, Nova Scotia, waiting to form up with a convoy for the cross-Atlantic voyage.

After a few days at a Rest Camp near Winchester, England, the squadron moved to Le Havre, France and then traveled by train to the Replacement Concentration Center, AEF, St. Maixent Replacement Barracks, France, arriving on 1 January 1918. At St. Maixent, the 101st was re-organized according to the vocations of the men. As a consequence, many changes were made with transfers in and out of the squadron. It was designated as a Service Squadron, and assigned to the 3d Aviation Instruction Center (3d AIC), Issoudun Aerodrome. It was assigned to the main field initially, before being moved to Field Five to take up the duties of the Engineering department. Its primary duty became the repairing and maintaining the conditions of the planes used in the instructional classes, primarily French Nieuports.

The squadron remained at 3d AIC until after the Armistice with Germany in November 1918, then returned to the United States in early April 1918. Arrived at Michel Field where the squadron members were demobilized and returned to civilian life.

=== Intra-War era ===
After World War I ended, there was a general interest in organizing aviation assets for the National Guard system. At the time, in the US force structure aircraft were organized into infantry units in a fashion similar to other weapons, like artillery. Guard units without their own aircraft units would need units from other forces to be sent to operate with them, a situation no-one thought was promising.

In Massachusetts, the Archie Club, composed of former Army Air Service pilots, lobbied for the formation of an air unit for the Massachusetts National Guard. The state had earlier been allotted the entire 26th Guard Division. The 101st built its own air base on land-filled tidal flats at Jeffries Point, East Boston. The 101 flew its Curtiss JN-4 "Jenny" aircraft throughout New England at air shows, county fairs and other events. In addition, the 101st attended two-week summer camps that simulated forward deployments. Pilots flew their Curtiss O-11s to temporary fields on Cape Cod while ground crews followed in trucks. One of these fields became Cape Cod Airfield.

In 1933 Jeffery Field was rebuilt with new hangars and administrative buildings, and renamed Logan Airport in honor of Major General Edward L. Logan, who commanded the 26th Division from 1923 to 1928. The 101st helped gain fame when it played a big part in the U.S. Army Air Service's flight around the world. It then cared for the Spirit of St. Louis when Charles Lindbergh visited the state.

On 11 January 1937, 2nd Lieutenant Frank Otis died when his Douglas O-46A crashed into the Illinois River. As a result, Otis Field was named for him in 1938.

==== World War II ====
In 1940, the 101st was separated from the 26th Infantry Division. On 31 July 1941, when it was then moved from Logan to Otis Field at Camp Edwards. Otis Field was named after 1st Lt Frank J. Otis Jr. On 20 May 1944, had its mission changed when it was re designated as the 39th Photo Reconnaissance Squadron. It was then placed under the command of the Ninth Air Force and deployed to the European Theater in December 1944. The 39th returned to the states in August 1945 and was redesignated as the 101st Fighter Squadron in May 1946, and then inactivated two months later.

Veterans of the 101st and Army Air Force reorganized the 101st at Logan Airport on 29 July 1946.

=== Cold War ===
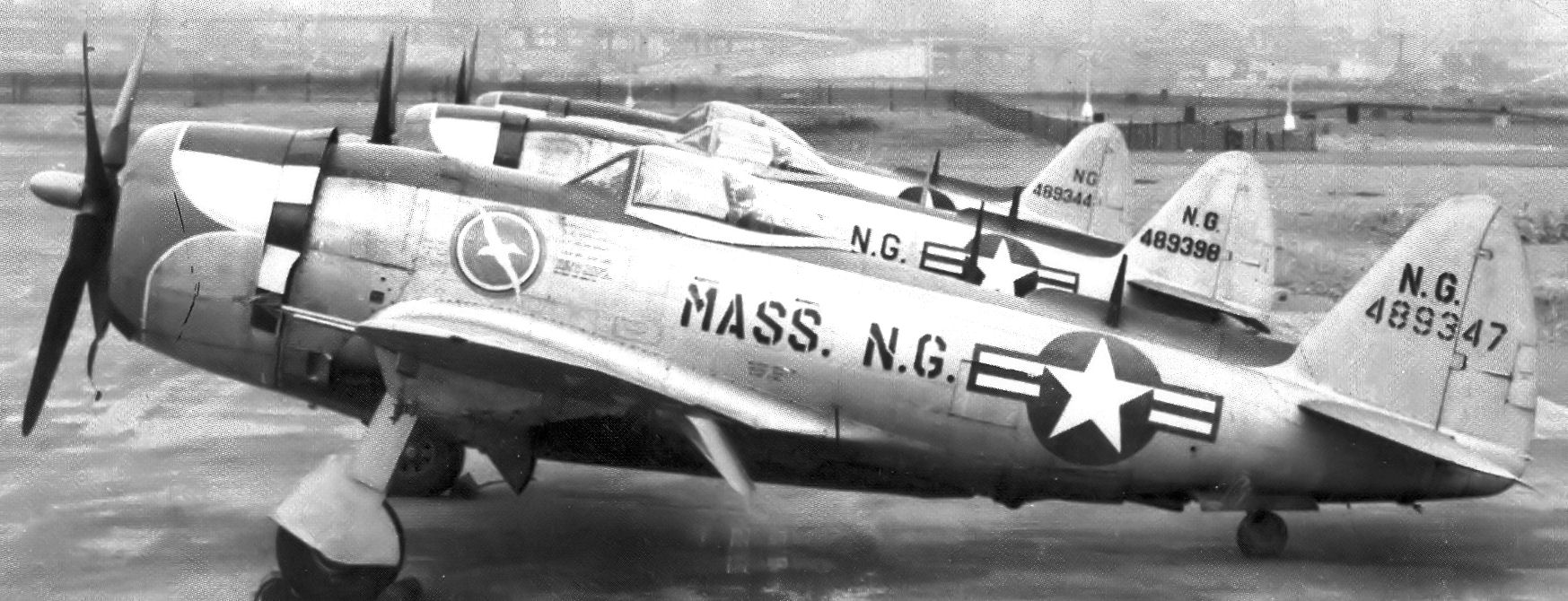
101st Fighter Squadron F-47N Thunderbolts at Logan Airport, Boston, 1949. Republic P-47N-25-RE Thunderbolt 44–89347 in foreground.

In the post-war era the National Guard Bureau began a major expansion of its air units. Massachusetts was allotted the 67th Fighter Wing, which was assigned to Air Defense Command.

With the formation of the US Air Force the Guard units suffered from neglect. In the midst of the switch to jet fighters, the Guard units were left with their handed-down and generally overused World War II propeller aircraft, and had little money for training. As the Cold War intensified, the Air Forced looked to the Guard to fill US-based interception missions and started overhauling their organization. On 1 November 1950 the 67th Fighter Wing was inactivated and replaced by the 102nd Fighter Wing, including just the 101st and 131st along with their associated support units. The squadrons were issued F-84B Thunderjets, but these aircraft were recalled and replaced by F-51 Mustangs which were flown until 1954 when the F-94 Starfire replaced the Twin Mustangs. In 1952 the 253d Combat Communications Group was activated and added to the 102nd. In 1958 the Wing converted to the F-86H Sabre.

From 1956 to 1976, the 102d was headed by Brigadier General Charles W. Sweeney, who piloted the Boeing B-29 Superfortress, which dropped the Fat Man atomic bomb on Nagasaki, Japan in 1945.

==== Berlin Crisis ====
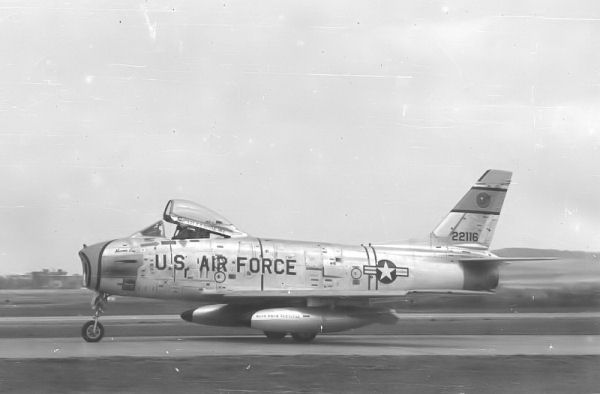
North American YF-86H-5-NA Sabre Serial 52-2116 of the 138th Tactical Fighter Squadron/102d Tactical Fighter Wing deployed at Phalsbourg – 1962. Originally manufactured as a pre-production F-86H, this aircraft was modified to production specifications before seeing operational service.

During the summer of 1961, as the Berlin Crisis unfolded, several USAF reserve units were notified on 16 August of their pending recall to active duty. On 1 October, the Massachusetts Air National Guard's 102nd Tactical Fighter Wing and its three squadrons, the 101st Tactical Fighter Squadron, the 131st Tactical Fighter Squadron, and the 138th Tactical Fighter Squadron went on active duty at Otis Air Force Base.

Between 28 and 30 October, the 101st TFS departed Logan International Airport to Phalsbourg, France. The wing deployed 82 Sabres across the Atlantic. In addition two C-47 Skytrains and six T-33 Shooting Star aircraft were assigned to the wing for support and training purposes. The 101st's primary mission at the time was to provide close air support to NATO ground forces and air interdiction. Starting on 5 December, the 102nd began deploying to Wheelus Air Base, Libya for gunnery training.

During its time in Europe, the 101st participated in several USAF and NATO exercises, including a deployment to Leck Air Base, West Germany near the Danish border. At Leck, ground and support crews from both countries exchanged duties, learning how to perform aircraft maintenance and operational support tasks.

On 7 May 1962, the Seventeenth Air Force stated that the 102nd would deploy back to the United States during the summer, returning in July 1962. Regular USAF personnel, along with a group of ANG personnel who volunteered to remain on active duty formed the 480th Tactical Fighter Squadron of the newly activated 366th Tactical Fighter Wing.

==== Relocation to Otis ====
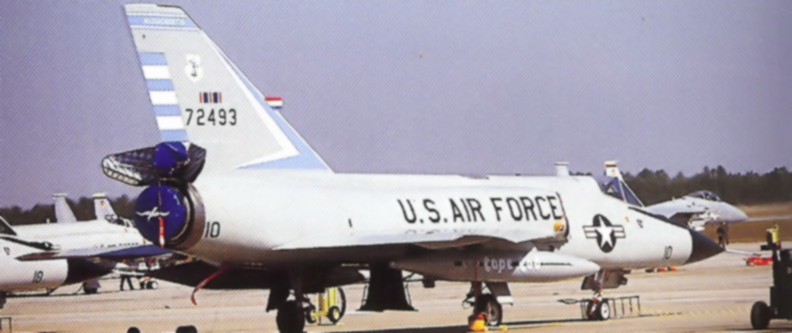
Convair F-106A-90-CO Delta Dart 57-2493 101st ADS. This aircraft was sent to AMARC on 22 January 1988. Expended as a QF-106 target drone (AD208) on 10 November 1994.

In 1968, the 102nd Tactical Fighter Wing moved to Otis Air Force Base. The next year the squadron was reassigned from Air Defense Command to Tactical Air Command. The wing flew the F-84F Thunderstreak from 1964 until June 1971, when a squadron of F-100D Super Sabres was transferred directly from units fighting the Vietnam War. After making the transition to the "Hun," the Mach 2 F-106 Delta Darts soon arrived to replace them. On 10 June 1972, after completing the move to the F-106, the unit officially became the 102nd Fighter Interceptor Squadron.

The squadron participated in the interception of Soviet TU-95 Bear bombers on many occasions, the first of which occurred off Long Island in 1975. Many of these occasions included escorting the aircraft to Cuba. Other escort missions involved the escorting of drug smuggling planes and the identifying of one mysterious ghost plane, which turned out later to be a weather balloon.

In 1976, the 102nd Fighter Interceptor Group was inactivated and the 102nd Fighter Interceptor Wing assumed authority for the 177th and 125th Fighter Interceptor Groups in Atlantic City, New Jersey, and Jacksonville, Florida, and for the 107th and 147th Fighter Interceptor Groups, flying F-4C Phantom at Niagara Falls, New York, and Ellington Field, Texas.

The 102nd FIW retired its F-106s on 5 January 1988. Between January and April 1988, the squadron converted to the F-15A Eagle, which it received from a unit inactivating at Minot Air Force Base. It then resumed its alert commitment at Otis, and also provided an alert detachment at Loring AFB. The 101st was the first ANG air defense unit to be equipped with the F-15.

=== Post-Cold War ===
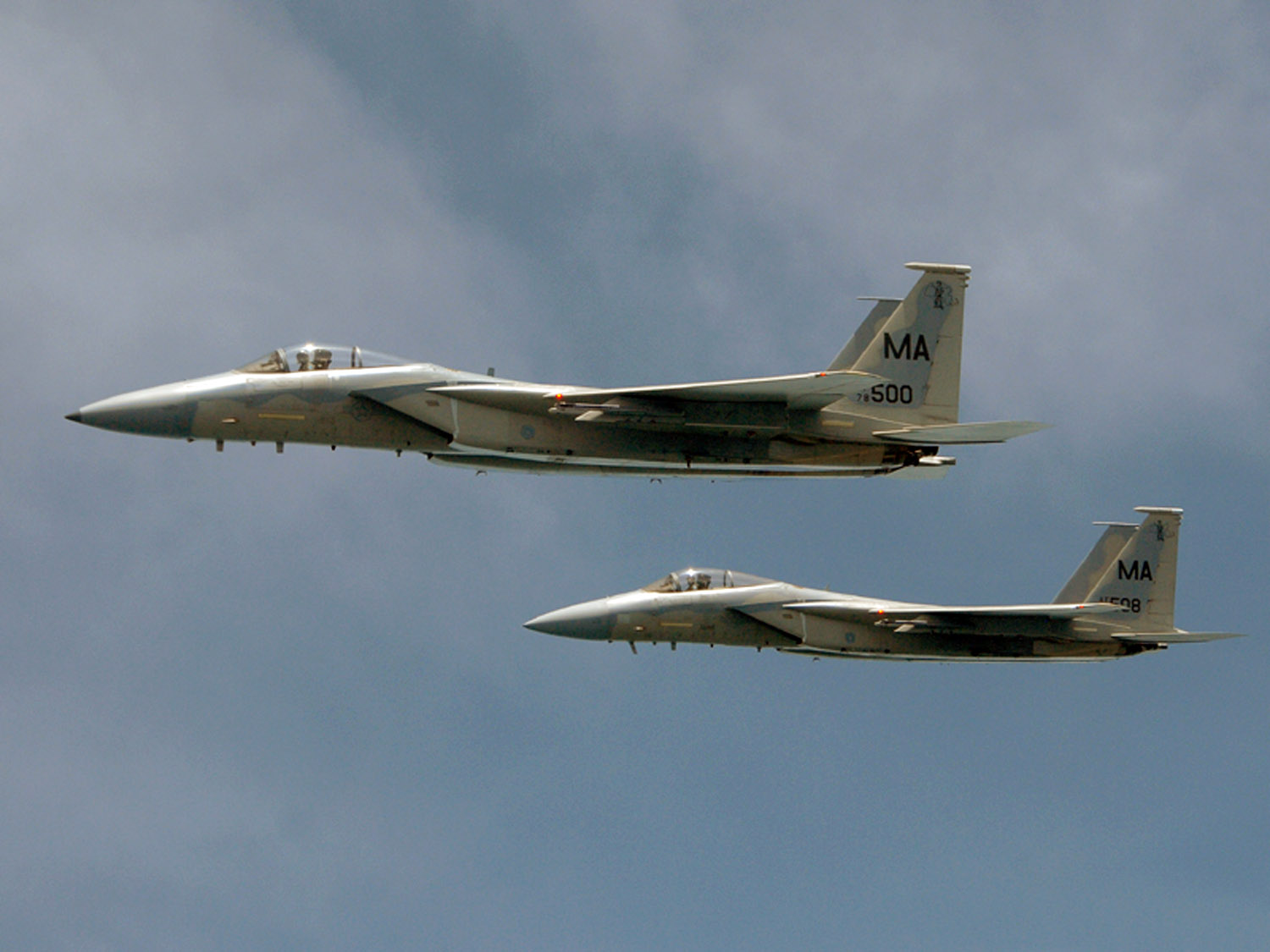
F-15's From Otis

The squadron continued its air defense mission after the fall of the Soviet Union. With the reorganization of the USAF in 1992, the wing was reassigned from the disbanding Tactical Air Command to the new Air Combat Command.

=== Global war on terror ===
==== 9/11 terrorist attacks ====
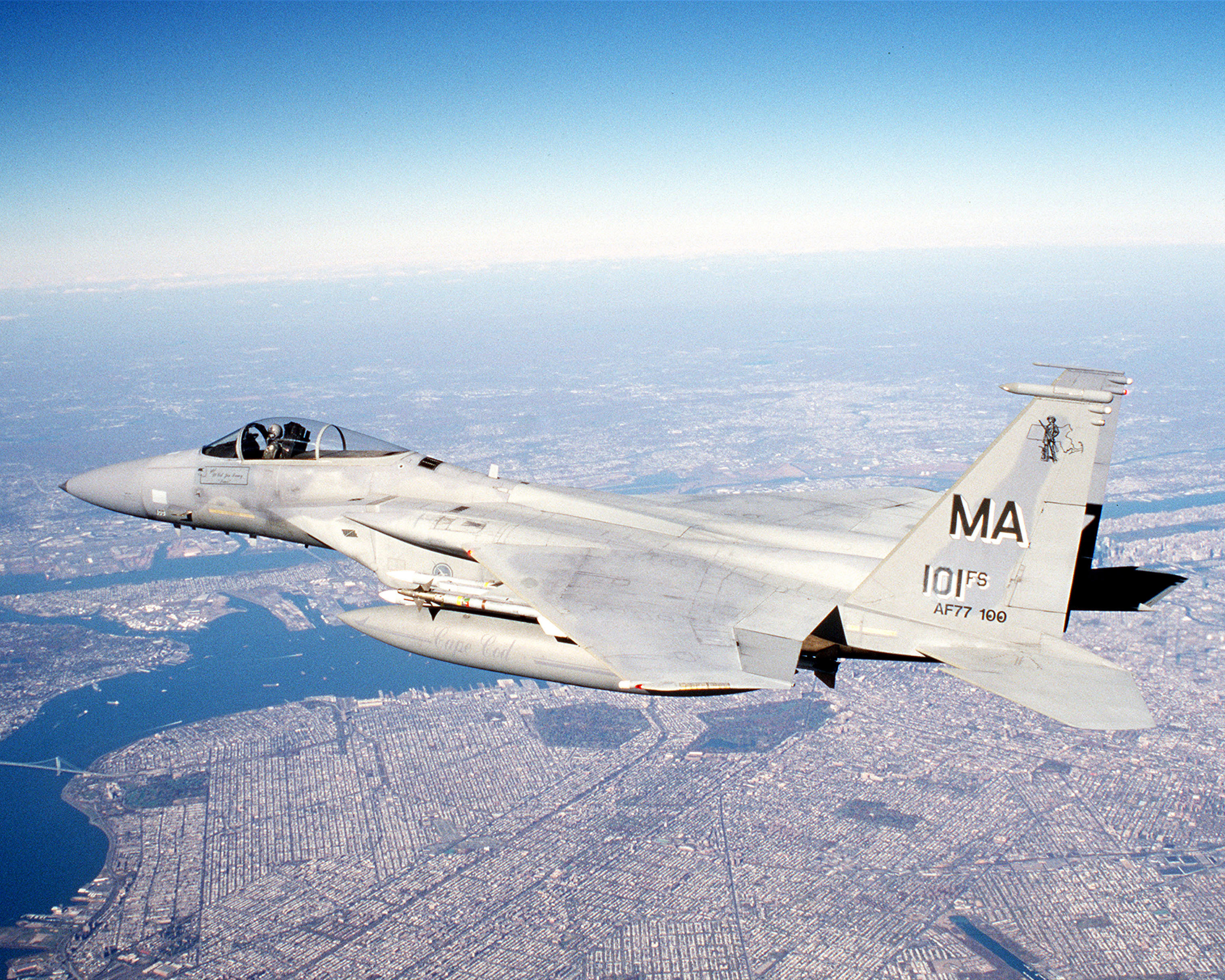
F-15 Over New York City after 9/11

On 11 September 2001, two planes were hijacked and flown towards New York City. Then Federal Aviation Administration contacted the North American Aerospace Defense Command's Northeast Air Defense Sector at Rome, New York, bypassing standard procedures. NORAD ordered the 101st Fighter Squadron to scramble its jets. Two F-15s piloted by Lieutenant Colonel Timothy Duffy and Major Daniel Nash were scrambled and took off to fly to New York. Difficulties in pinpointing the exact location of Flight 11 led to a delay of five minutes before the scramble order was given at 8:43. When Flight 11 hit the North Tower at 8:46, the two F-15 Eagles that had been ordered to scramble were still on the runway at Otis; they did not take to the air until 8:52. Lacking a target, the F-15s were directed to airspace off the Long Island coast. Uncertain about what to do, the planes were ordered to 'hold as needed' there. At 9:02, Flight 175 hit the South Tower while the fighters flew to their holding position. The Northeast Air Defense Sector was not contacted about this hijacked plane until 9:03. From 9:09 to 9:13 the F-15s stayed in the holding pattern. At 9:13, the pilots of the F-15s told FAA Boston Center that they were heading for Manhattan to establish a Combat Air Patrol (CAP) over the area. The F-15s arrived over Manhattan at 9:25.

==== Operations Noble Eagle ====
More than 600 wing members were mobilized for Operation Noble Eagle at different times. The wing never deployed overseas to support the wars in Afghanistan and Iraq but it did continue to patrol the Northeastern United States skies. The wing converted from the F-15A/B to the F-15C/D in 2004.

==== BRAC 2005 ====
The BRAC 2005 commission originally planned to close Otis Air National Guard Base and dissolve the 101st. Locals argued that this would leave a huge gap in the national air defenses. BRAC officials, after visiting the base, decided to keep it open, but the 101st would still lose its planes, only this time they were only going to the 104th Fighter Wing, based at Barnes Municipal Airport, near the town of Westfield in western Massachusetts.

The wing hosted its last airshow with the F-15C Eagle at the end of Air Force Week in August 2007. The wing shared a commonality with the 101st Air Refueling Wing, the 103d Fighter Wing, and the 104th Fighter Wing, which due to BRAC decisions, also changed the type of planes that they flew. Beginning in 2007, the F-15s began moving to Barnes Municipal Airport. With the grounding of the F-15 Eagles, the 158th Fighter Wing, which is based in Vermont temporarily took over the role of patrolling the Northeast's skies. This interruption of the F-15's flight, coinciding with the transitioning of the fighter jets to the 104th Fighter Wing, created some issues. The move was originally scheduled to be completed at the end of January, but the grounding of the F-15's in late 2007 and early 2008 delayed this move to the end of February.

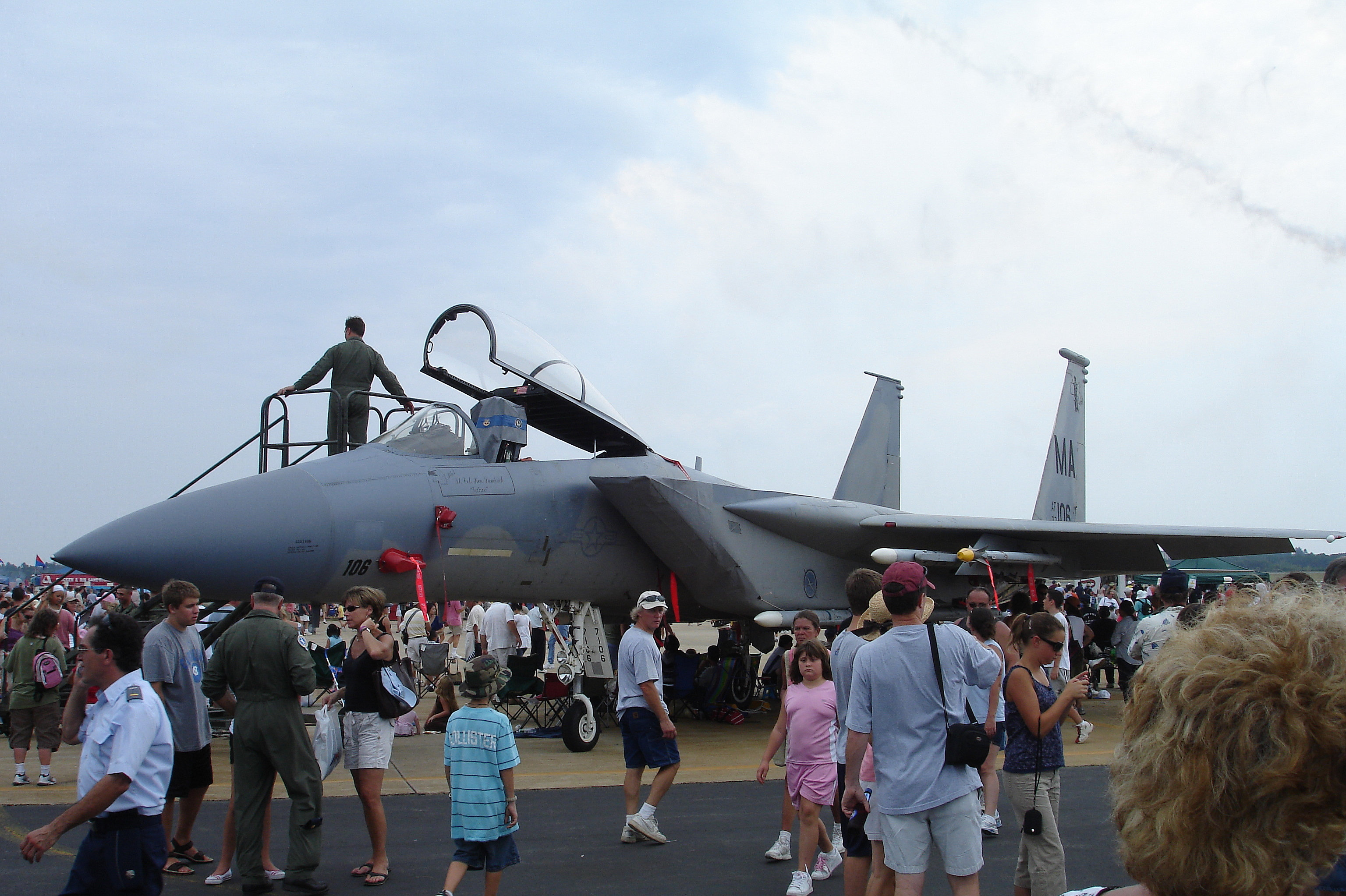
F-15 From 101st Fighter Squadron during the 2007 Cape Cod Airshow

On 24 January 2008, the 101st Fighter Squadron flew its last patrol mission. The unit's wing commander, Colonel Anthony Schiavi, led the flight, accompanied by Major Daniel Nash, who was one of the first responders for 9/11. Fire trucks were on hand when the team landed a half-hour later, giving the planes and the pilots the customary ceremonial hose-down for the last time.

==== New Mission ====
As soon as it was announced that the wing would be kept alive and Otis Air National Guard Base would remain open, the state government began thinking of the future for the 101st. There was talk among the members of the Massachusetts National Guard that it could transition to an intelligence mission so that it could help support the war on terror. The plans hit a roadblock when it was announced that there were few funds left with which the wing could use to transition into its new mission.

The new mission was finally confirmed when Governor Deval Patrick announced that the wing would transition to an intelligence mission as soon as the planes left. Original BRAC plans only said that a Distributed Common Ground System would be created at Otis. These plans didn't include the air guardsmen affected by the loss of their jobs. The issue was finally resolved when the Air Force announced its plans, right before the F-15's started to leave for Barnes.

On 1 April 2008, the 101st Fighter Squadron was re-designated as the 101st Intelligence Squadron, with a formal ceremony on 6 April. The wing will reach full operation in 2010. By 1 October, the wing is expected to be operationally ready.

During the time preceding the wing reaching full operational capacity, members of the wing had the option of moving with the F-15s to Barnes. Most members decided to stay behind and train for their new missions. The crash trucks moved with the F-15s to Barnes, leaving the brush breakers of the Massachusetts Military Reservation behind. The buildings formerly occupied by the planes will be reused for the intelligence mission by wing members. These buildings include the hangars that the F-15s formerly occupied.

=== Lineage ===
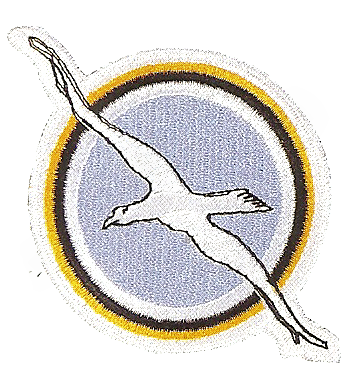
Emblem of the 101st Fighter Interceptor Squadron

- Organized as 101st Aero Squadron on 22 August 1917

Re-designated: 101st Aero Squadron (Services), on 21 February 1918
Demobilized on 14 April 1919

- Constituted in the National Guard in 1921 as the 101st Squadron (Observation), and allotted to the state of Massachusetts.

Organized from the 1st Aero Unit (organized about February 1921 at Boston, MA) and Federally recognized on 18 November 1921
Re-designated 101st Observation Squadron on 25 January 1923

- Consolidated with the 101st Aero Squadron, on 20 October 1936

Ordered to active service on 25 November 1940
Re-designated: 101st Observation Squadron (Light) on 13 January 1942
Re-designated: 101st Observation Squadron on 4 July 1942
Re-designated: 101st Reconnaissance Squadron (Fighter) on 2 April 1943
Re-designated: 101st Tactical Reconnaissance Squadron on 11 August 1943
Re-designated: 101st Photographic Mapping Squadron on 9 October 1943
Re-designated: 39th Photographic Reconnaissance Squadron on 29 March 1944
Re-designated: 39th Tactical Reconnaissance Squadron on 4 December 1945
Inactivated on 29 Ju1 1946

- Re-designated 101st Fighter Squadron, and allotted to Massachusetts Air National Guard on 29 July 1946.

Federally recognized and activated on: 15 October 1946
Federalized and placed on active duty, 1 April 1951
Re-designated: 101st Fighter-Interceptor Squadron, 1 November 1951
Released from active duty and returned to Massachusetts commonwealth control, 1 November 1952
Federalized and placed on active duty, 1 October 1961
Released from active duty and returned to Massachusetts commonwealth control, 31 August 1962
Re-designated: 101st Tactical Fighter Squadron, 1 June 1969
Re-designated: 101st Fighter-Interceptor Squadron, 28 April 1972
Re-designated: 101st Fighter Squadron, 16 March 1993
Re-designated: 101st Intelligence Squadron, 1 April 2008

=== Assignments ===
- Post Headquarters, Kelly Field, 22 August – 3 December 1918
- Aviation Concentration Center, 3 November 1917 – 1 January 1918
- Replacement Concentration Center, AEF, 1 January – 21 February 1918
- 3d Aviation Instruction Center, 21 February 1918 – 6 January 1919
- Commanding General, Services of Supply, 6 January – 18 March 1919
- Post Headquarters, Michel Field, 5–14 April 1919
- Massachusetts National Guard, (divisional aviation, 26th Division), 18 November 1921
- First Corps Area, 25 November 1940
- VI Army Corps, 30 December 1940
- 26th Observation (later Reconnaissance; Tactical Reconnaissance) Group, 1 September 1941
- 74th Tactical Reconnaissance Group, 9 October 1943
- 76th Tactical Reconnaissance Group, 21 October 1943
- III Tactical Air Division, 29 March 1944
- I (later III) Tactical Air Division, 12 April 1944
- Ninth Air Force, 6 January 1945

Flight attached to XIX Tactical Air Command to 28 February 1945
Flights attached to IX Tactical Air Command and XXIX Tactical Air Command [Prov] to 10 March 1945

- 10th Photographic Group, 28 February 1945
- Ninth Air Force

Attached to 9th Tactical Reconnaissance Group [Prov), 30 March 1945

- 363d Tactical Reconnaissance (later Reconnaissance) Group, 23 May 1945
- United States Strategic Air Forces in Europe, 25 June 1945
- Third Air Force, 3 August 1945
- Fourth Air Force, 24 October 1945

Attached to 412th Fighter Group, 5 November 1945 – 3 July 1946

- Tactical Air Command, 21 March 1946
- Twelfth Air Force, 17 May – 29 July 1946
- 102nd Fighter Group, 15 October 1946

Redesignated: 102d Fighter-Interceptor Group, 28 April 1972
Redesignated: 102d Fighter-Interceptor Wing, 1976
Redesignated: 102d Tactical Fighter Wing, 10 February 1988
Redesignated: 102d Fighter Wing, April 1992
Redesignated: 102d Intelligence Wing, 1 April 2008

=== Major Command ===
- Air National Guard/Air Combat Command (1992–present)
- Air National Guard/Tactical Air Command (1969–1992)
- Air National Guard/Air Defense Command (1946–1969)

=== Stations ===
- Kelly Field, Texas, 22 August 1917
- Aviation Concentration Center, Garden City, New York, 3 Nov-c. 4 December 1917
- St. Maixent Replacement Barracks, France, 1 January 1918
- Issoudun Aerodrome, France, 21 February 1918
- Bordeaux, France, 6 January – 18 March 1919
- Mitchel Field, New York, c. 5–14 April 1919
- Jeffery Field, Massachusetts, 18 November 1921
- Otis Field, Massachusetts, 31 July 1941
- Hyannis Army Airfield, Massachusetts, 31 July 1942;
- Harrisburg Municipal Airport, Pennsylvania, 11 September 1942
- Reading Army Airfield, Pennsylvania, 1 June 1943
- Thermal Army Airfield, California, 11 January 1944
- Muskogee Army Airfield, Oklahoma, 12 Apr – 17 December 1944
- Denain/Prouvy Airfield (A-83), France, 24 January 1945
- St Amand Airfield, France, c. 7 February 1945

Flight at: Jarny Airfield (A-94), France, '10 February – 7 March 1945
Flight at: Gosselies Airfield (A-87), Belgium 13 February – 8 March 1945
Flight at: Le Culot Airfield (A-89), Belgium, 8 February – 8 March 1945

- Jarny Airfield (A-94), France, 7 March 1945
- Maastricht Airport (Y-44), Netherlands, 2 April 1945
- Wiesbaden Airfield (Y-80), Germany, 20 April–July 1945
- Drew Field, Florida, 3 August 1945
- Santa Maria Army Airfield, California, 24 October 1945
- March Field, California, 3 December 1945 – 29 July 1946
- Logan Airport, Massachusetts, 15 October 1946

Deployed to: Leck Air Base, West Germany, 1961
Deployed to: Wheelus Air Base, Libya, 1961
Deployed to: Phalsbourg-Bourscheid Air Base, 1961–1962

- Otis AFB, 1968–Present

Detachment 1

Loring Air Force Base (1986–1993)
Bangor International Airport (1993–2008)

=== Aircraft ===
- Included Curtiss JN-4, JN-6, PT-I, BT-1, 0–2, 0–11, XO-12, and 0-17 during period 1922–1933
- Numerous light observation aircraft, 1932–1943
- North American O-47 1940–1941
- P-40 Warhawk, 1943
- B-25 Mitchell, 1943–1944
- L-5, O-52, P-39 Airacobra, 1943–1944
- F-5 Lightning, 1944–1945
- P-51 Mustang, 1946
- P-80 Shooting Star, 1946
- P-47 Thunderbolt (1947–???)
- P-51H Mustang (195?–1954)
- F-94A/B Starfire (1954–1958)
- F-86H Sabre (1958–1964)
- F-84B/F Thunderstreak (1964–1971)
- F-100D Super Sabre (1971–1972)
- F-106A/B Delta Dart (1972–1987)
- F-15A/B Eagle (1987–2004)
- F-15C Eagle (2004–2008)

== See also ==
- List of American aero squadrons
- List of observation squadrons of the United States Army National Guard
