= 14th Antisubmarine Squadron =

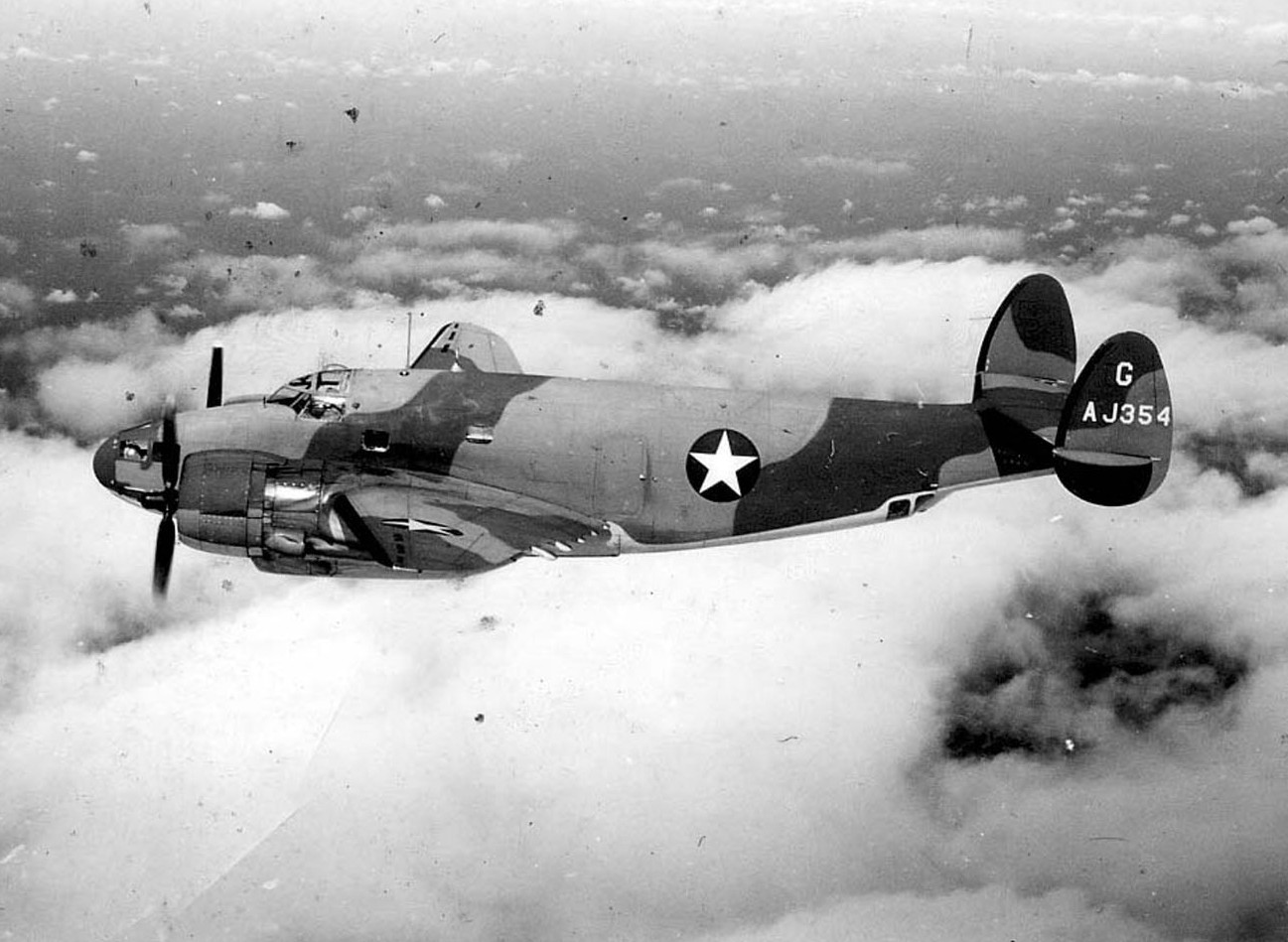
- Lockheed B-34 as flown by the squadron
- Active: 1942–1943
- Country: United States
- Branch: United States Army Air Forces
- Role: anti-submarine warfare
- Engagements: Antisubmarine Campaign

Insignia
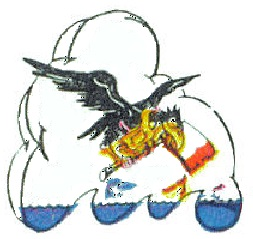
- 14th Antisubmarine Squadron (Note: Approved 10 April 1943. Description: On an irregular cloud formation, a caricatured large black crow in flight, beak and feet yellow, wearing a life jacket proper, and grasping an axe by the handle with its feet; blade of axe covered with blood, and dripping three drops of blood proper, all over the sea blue in base)

The 14th Antisubmarine Squadron is a disbanded United States Army Air Forces unit. It was activated in 1942 as the 519th Bombardment Squadron and flew antisubmarine missions off the Atlantic coast until the Navy assumed its mission. It then moved to Texas, where it was disbanded in November 1943 and its personnel were used as cadres for heavy bomber groups.

== History ==
The squadron was first activated as the 519th Bombardment Squadron at Hyannis Naval Auxiliary Air Facility, Massachusetts on 18 October 1942, when the 377th Bombardment Group replaced the 59th Observation Group at Fort Dix Army Air Field and assumed its mission, personnel and equipment. The 519th was initially equipped with the North American O-47s and Curtiss O-52 Owls of the 119th Observation Squadron, whose mission, personnel and equipment it absorbed on activation. It began to convert to North American B-25 Mitchells later in the year and added Lockheed B-34 Venturas in 1943, phasing out the short range observation aircraft.

In October 1942, the Army Air Forces organized its antisubmarine forces into the single Army Air Forces Antisubmarine Command, which established the 25th Antisubmarine Wing the following month to control its forces operating over the Atlantic. Its bombardment group headquarters, including the 377th, were inactivated and the squadron, now designated the 14th Antisubmarine Squadron, was assigned directly to the 25th Wing. The squadron moved to Otis Field, Massachusetts in November 1942 (although it deployed to Langley Field, Virginia, from July to August 1943). In July 1943, the AAF and Navy reached an agreement to transfer the coastal antisubmarine mission to the Navy. This mission transfer also included an exchange of AAF long-range bombers equipped for antisubmarine warfare for Navy Consolidated B-24 Liberators without such equipment.

In October 1943, the squadron moved to Biggs Field, Texas, where it briefly flew Consolidated B-24 Liberator heavy bombers under Second Air Force. However its heavy bomber training ended lest than a month later, when it was disbanded its personnel formed cadres for new heavy bomber units.

== Lineage ==
- Constituted as the 519th Bombardment Squadron (Heavy) on 13 October 1942

Activated on 18 October 1942
Redesignated 14th Anti-Submarine Squadron (Heavy) on 29 November 1942
Disbanded on 4 November 1943

=== Assignments ===
- 377th Bombardment Group, 18 October 1942.
- 25th Antisubmarine Wing, 9 December 1942.
- Second Air Force, 7 October – 4 November 1943

=== Stations ===
- Hyannis Naval Auxiliary Air Facility, Massachusetts, 18 October 1942.
- Otis Field, Massachusetts, 6 November 1942 (deployed to Langley Field, Virginia, 19 July – 10 August 1943)
- Biggs Field, Texas, 7 October – 4 November 1943

=== Aircraft ===
- North American O-47, 1942
- Curtiss O-52 Owl, 1942
- North American B-25 Mitchell, 1942–1943
- Lockheed B-34 Ventura, 1943
- Consolidated B-24 Liberator, 1943

=== Campaigns ===
Streamer	Campaign	Dates	Notes
	American Theater of World War II	18 October 1942 – 1 August 1943	519th Bombardment Squadron (later 14th Antisubmarine Squadron)
